= Vest-Agder =

County of Norway (1685–2020)

Vest-Agder County Vest-Agder fylke
- Former County
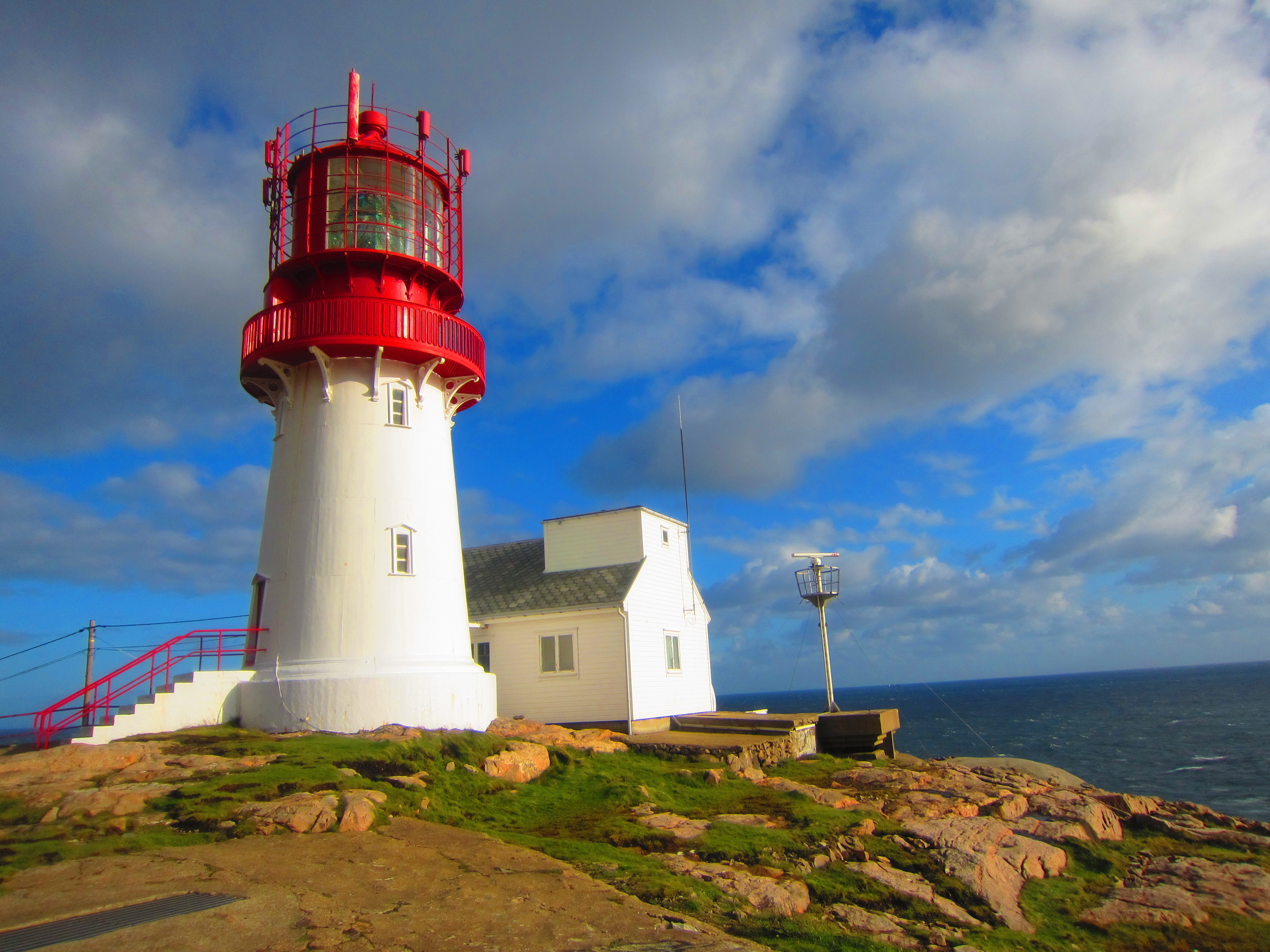
- Lindesnes Lighthouse in September 2011

- Flag Coat of arms

- Vest-Agder within Norway
- Coordinates: 58.5°N 07.1°E
- Country: Norway
- County: Vest-Agder
- District: Southern Norway
- Established: 1685
  - Preceded by: Agdesiden
- Disestablished: 1 Jan 2020
  - Succeeded by: Agder county
- Administrative centre: Kristiansand

Government
  - Body: Vest-Agder County Municipality
  - Governor (2016-2019): Stein Arve Ytterdahl
  - County mayor (2011-2019): Terje Damman (H)

Area (upon dissolution)
  - Total: 7,276.53 km^{2} (2,809.48 sq mi)
  - Land: 6,678.89 km^{2} (2,578.73 sq mi)
  - Water: 597.64 km^{2} (230.75 sq mi)

Population (30 September 2019)
  - Total: 188,722
  - Density: 27.4/km^{2} (71/sq mi)
  - Change (10 years): ▲ +12.6%
- Demonym: Vestegde

Official language
  - Norwegian form: Neutral
- Time zone: UTC+01:00 (CET)
  - Summer (DST): UTC+02:00 (CEST)
- ISO 3166 code: NO-10
- Income (per capita): 137,000 kr (2001)
- GDP (per capita): 219,928 kr (2001)
- GDP national rank: #14 in Norway (2.27% of country)

Vest-Agder (Norwegian: [ˈvɛ̂stˌɑɡdər]; "West Agder") was one of 18 counties (fylker) in Norway from 1 January 1919 to 31 December 2019, after it was merged with Aust-Agder to form Agder county. In 2016, there were 182,701 inhabitants, around 3.5% of the total population of Norway. Its area was about 7,277 square kilometres (2,810 sq mi). The county administration was located in its largest city, Kristiansand.

Vest-Agder was a major source of timber for Dutch and later English shipping from the 16th century onwards. Historically, the area exported timber, wooden products, salmon, herring, ships, and later nickel, paper, and ferrous and silica alloys. Compared to other counties of Norway, today's exports-intensive industry produces shipping and offshore equipment (National Oilwell Varco), cranes (Cargotec), ships (Umoe Mandal, Flekkefjord Slip), wind turbine equipment, nickel (Glencore), and solar industry microsilica (Elkem). A major tourist attraction is Kristiansand Dyrepark.

Vest-Agder grew to political prominence with the decision of King Christian IV to establish Kristiansand as a key naval base, trading centre, and bishopric in 1641, forcing urban citizens and merchants from all over Agder to settle in the city. The county had large-scale emigration to North America from the 1850s onwards.

== General information ==
=== Name ===
The meaning of the name is "(the) western (part of) Agder".

Lister og Mandal amt was created on 1 January 1662 and it consisted of the two old lens of Lister and Mandal. This name continued until 1 January 1919, when the name was changed to Vest-Agder.

=== Coat-of-arms ===
The coat-of-arms is from modern times, granted on 12 December 1958. It shows an oak tree in yellow against a green background, representing the historic rich nature and oak woods in the area.

== Geography ==
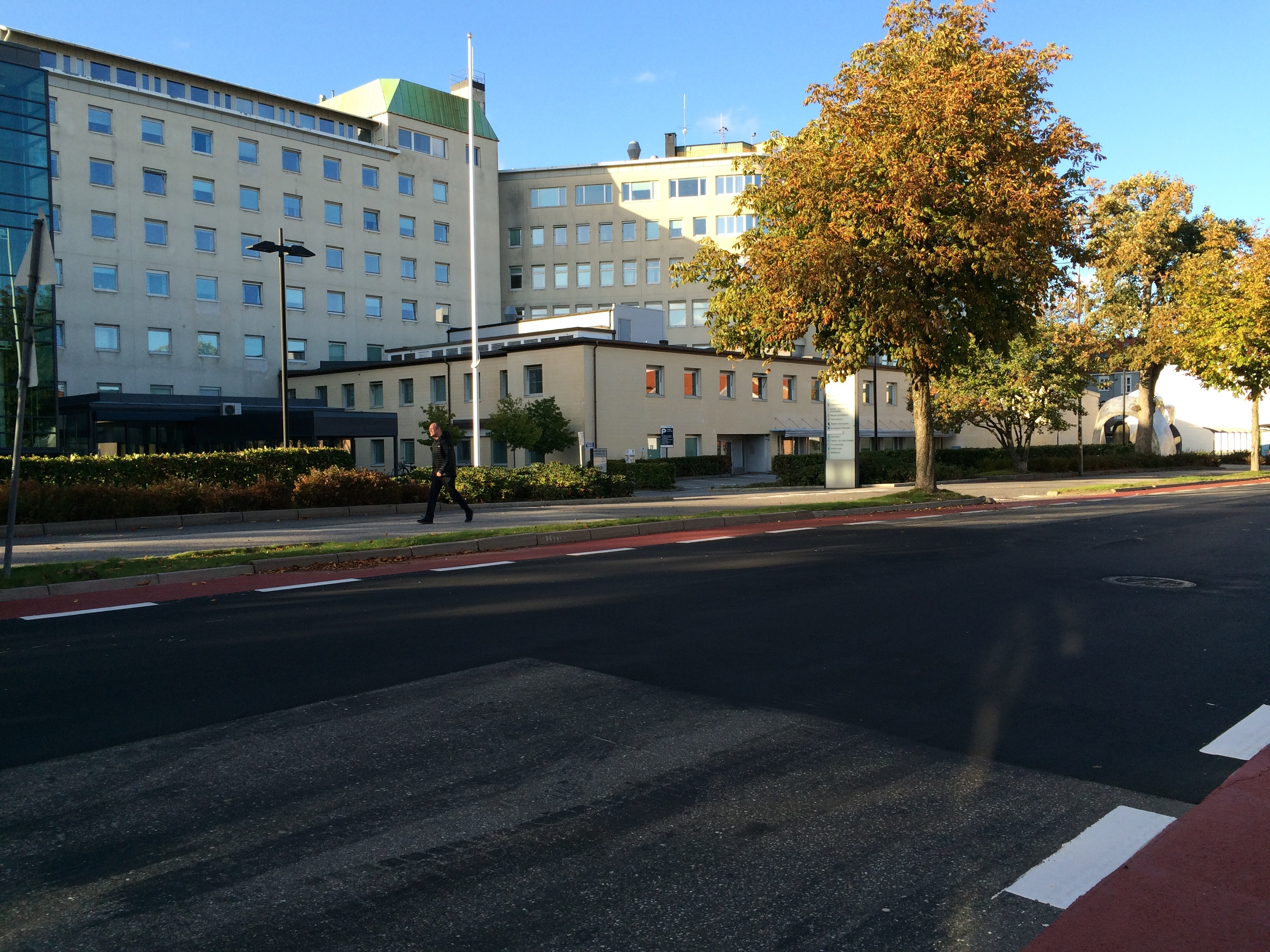
Vest-Agder county house in Kristiansand

Vest-Agder is the western and southernmost part of the current county of Agder, extending inland from the North Sea and its arm, the Skagerrak, to the southern fringes of Setesdalen, surrounded by the mountain range Setesdalsheiene. It includes the southernmost point of the entire country, Pysen island south of Mandal, and the southernmost part of continental Norway, Lindesnes. It has a very broken and hilly surface. From the coast there are six valleys that stretch north into the county: Audnedalen, Lyngdalen, Kvinesdalen, Mandalen, Sirdalen, and Otradalen (which continues into Aust-Agder where it is called Setesdalen).

Most of the habitation lies along the coast, including the towns Kristiansand, Mandal, Flekkefjord, and Farsund. About 31 fjords are located there. The northern portion is mountainous and sparsely settled, while the central upland moors are used for pasturing of cattle and sheep. Since the Gulf Stream touches the coast of Vest-Agder, it is also called "the Norwegian Riviera", and Agder as a whole is also called "The California of Norway".

== History ==
Historical population
Year	Pop.	±%
1951	96,942	—
1961	109,083	+12.5%
1971	124,171	+13.8%
1981	136,718	+10.1%
1991	145,091	+6.1%
2001	156,878	+8.1%
2011	172,408	+9.9%
Source: Statistics Norway.

Religion in Vest-Agder
religion	percent
Christianity	85.66%
Islam	1.29%
Buddhism	0.33%
Other	12.72%

The oldest ever remains of an 8,000+ year old human in Norway has been found at Søgne, she endured an almost exclusively marine diet. In Kristiansand, a Sarup-style Neolithic funeral site from 3,400 BC has been excavated. Just before and after the onset of the common era, the region was uniquely rich in sites dedicated to the God Ull (Ullr), and also had a semi-urban settlement at Oddernes (Kristiansand). Norway's first possible all-national king, Halvdan Svarte, was raised probably in the Kvinesdalen valley at a matrimonial manor, his mother was presumably the daughter of King Harald of Agder. He was followed by his son King Harald Fairhair, who had his easternmost manor at Kongsgård near Kristiansand. Churches are known since Viking ages. Vest-Agder was not particularly preeminent in the later Viking and Medieval Ages. Mandal (Vesterrisør) and Kristiansand (Ottrunes) had semi-urban trading centers from the 1300s onwards, but did not enjoy urban economic privileges until the 1632 (Mandal) and 1641 (Kristiansand). A general lack of agricultural fertility made the region remaining a relatively poor part of Norway through the centuries.

In the 16th century, Dutch merchant vessels began to visit ports in southern Norway to purchase salmon and other goods. Soon thereafter the export of timber began, as oak from southern Norway was exceptionally well suited for shipbuilding. As the Netherlands developed in the 17th century, it began to suffer from a severe labor shortage, and many families from Vest-Agder and Aust-Agder emigrated to the Netherlands, especially the coastal areas.

In the 19th century, emigration to the United States started. One of the most important causes of this emigration was the emergence of steamships. While Vest-Agder and Aust-Agder historically had very strong positions in the manufacture and repair of sailing ships, the shift to steamships was poorly utilised and resulted in a cyclical slope for the shipbuilding and shipping industries. Emigration to the United States was a means of escaping from the high unemployment that followed. Many Americans returning to the county after Norway became prosperous. This feature is particularly predominant in Kvinesdal and Farsund in the west, which maintains strong cultural links with the United States.

During World War II the area had substantial fortifications and German personnel, with major bases and airfields in Lista, Mandal and Kristiansand. Batterie Vara near Kristiansand was constructed as one out of two 40 cm coastal artillery forts covering the Skagerrak Sea in conjunction with a similar fort in northern Denmark. After the war, Kristiansand grew considerably whereas other cities lost much of their relative economic and demographic importance.

== Municipalities ==
On 1 January 1838, all the counties were divided into local administrative units each with their own governments (see formannskapsdistrikt law). The number and borders of these municipalities were based on the parishes of the Church of Norway. Over time the number and locations of these have changed, and at present there are 15 municipalities in Vest-Agder. Åseral Municipality was part of the neighboring county of Nedenes until 1880, when it was moved to Vest-Agder.

=== Municipalities before 2020 ===
Rank	Name	Inhabitants	Area km^{2}
1	Kristiansand Municipality	90,000	261
2	Mandal Municipality	14,696	212
3	Vennesla Municipality	13,116	363
4	Søgne Municipality	12,509	144
5	Farsund Municipality	9,310	252
6	Flekkefjord Municipality	9,003	482
7	Lyngdal Municipality	7,739	372
8	Songdalen Municipality	5,940	207
9	Kvinesdal Municipality	5,776	893
10	Lindesnes Municipality	4,661	299
11	Marnardal Municipality	2,231	379
12	Sirdal Municipality	1,790	1,555
13	Audnedal Municipality	1,670	251
14	Hægebostad Municipality	1,624	426
15	Åseral Municipality	917	801
Total	Vest-Agder	182,377	7,281

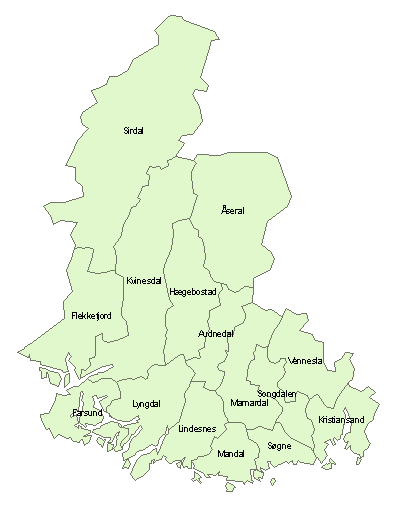
Municipalities in Vest-Agder before 2020.

== Cities ==
- Alleen
- Farsund
- Flekkefjord
- Kristiansand
- Lyngdal
- Mandal

== Parishes ==
- Austad
- Bakke
- Bjelland
- Eiken (Egen)
- Farsund
- Feda
- Finsland
- Fjotland
- Flekkefjord
- Flekkerøy
- Frelseren
- Greipstad
- Grim
- Grindheim (Grindum)
- Gyland
- Halse (Halsaa)
- Harkmark
- Haughom
- Hellemyr
- Herad (Herred)
- Hidra (Hitterø)
- Holum (Holme)
- Hægebostad (Øvre Kvinesdal)
- Hægeland (Heggeland)
- Hånes
- Justvik
- Konsmo
- Korshamn
- Kristiansand
- Kristiansand tukthus
- Kvinesdal
- Kvævemoen
- Kvås (Qvås)
- Laudal
- Liknes, see Kvinesdal
- Lista (Vanse)
- Ljosland
- Lund
- Lunde
- Lyngdal
- Mandal
- Nes
- Nord-Audnedal
- Netlandsnes
- Oddernes
- Randesund
- Sirdal
- Spangereid
- Spind
- Søgne
- Old Søgne
- Søm
- Sør-Audnedal
- Tonstad
- Torridal
- Tveit
- Valle
- Vanse
- Vennesla
- Vestbygda
- Vigmostad
- Voie
- Vågsbygd
- Øvrebø
- Øvre Sirdal
- Øyslebø
- Åknes
- Åseral
- Flekkefjord Branch (LDS, 1899–1904)
- Kristiansand Branch (LDS, 1856–1912)
- Kristiansand (Katolske Apostoliske, 1896–1925)

== Villages ==
- Alleen
- Andabeløy
- Aukland
- Austad
- Ausvika
- Birkeland
- Bjelland
- Bjørnestad
- Breland
- Brennåsen
- Eik
- Eiken
- Eikerapen
- Feda
- Finsland
- Fjotland
- Fleseland
- Grindheim
- Grovane
- Gyland
- Haddeland
- Harkmark
- Heddeland
- Homstean
- Hægeland
- Hæåk
- Høllen
- Høllen
- Hånes
- Ime
- Justvik (Gjusvik)
- Kilen
- Kirkehavn
- Knaben
- Koland
- Konsmo
- Korshamn
- Krossen
- Kvås
- Kyrkjebygda
- Langenes
- Laudal
- Liknes
- Ljosland
- Lohne
- Loshavn
- Lunde, Sirdal
- Lunde
- Mosby
- Mushom
- Nodeland
- Nodelandsheia
- Ny-Hellesund
- Ore
- Randesund
- Rasvåg
- Røyknes
- Sande
- Skarpengland
- Skofteland
- Skomrak
- Sira
- Sirnes
- Skålevik
- Snartemo
- Storekvina
- Strai
- Svenevig
- Svenevik
- Tangvall
- Tingvatn
- Tonstad
- Trysnes
- Tveit
- Vanse
- Ve
- Vedderheia
- Vennesla
- Vestbygd
- Vigeland
- Vigmostad
- Volleberg
- Øvre Eikeland
- Øvrebø
- Øyslebø
- Åknes
- Ålefjær
- Ålo
- Åna-Sira
- Åros
- Åvik

== Former Municipalities ==
- Austad Municipality
- Bakke Municipality
- Bjelland Municipality
- Bjelland og Grindum Municipality
- Eiken Municipality
- Feda Municipality
- Finsland Municipality
- Fjotland Municipality
- Greipstad Municipality
- Grindheim Municipality
- Gyland Municipality
- Halse og Harkmark Municipality
- Herad Municipality
- Hidra Municipality
- Holum Municipality
- Hægeland Municipality
- Konsmo Municipality
- Kvås Municipality
- Laudal Municipality
- Lista Municipality
- Nes Municipality
- Nes og Hidra Municipality
- Nord-Audnedal Municipality
- Oddernes Municipality
- Randesund Municipality
- Spangereid Municipality
- Spind Municipality
- Sør-Audnedal Municipality
- Tonstad Municipality
- Tveit Municipality
- Undal Municipality
- Vigmostad Municipality
- Øvre Sirdal Municipality
- Øvrebø Municipality
- Øvrebø og Hægeland Municipality
- Øyslebø Municipality
- Øyslebø og Laudal Municipality

== Notable people ==
- Sofus Arctander (1845–1924), Liberal politician, Prime Minister for a brief period in 1905.
- Bernt Balchen (1899–1973), aeronaut, WWII pilot, polar navigator, military officer.
- Jens Bjørneboe (1920–1976), author and playwright.
- Camilla Collett (Wergeland) (1813–1895), author, writer, feminist, emancipator.
- Bjøro Håland, country & western musician.
- Bjarne Lingås (1933–2011), heavyweight boxer, amateur (198, 14 losses) and professional (14, 2 losses).
- Rolf Løvland, musician, composer, director, twice winning European Song Contest.
- Herman Wedel Major (1814–1854, born in Ireland), regarded as the founder of modern psychiatry in Norway.
- Svein Mathisen (1952–2011), football player for IK Start, Hibernian, and Norway.
- Mette-Marit, Crown Princess of Norway (1973–), Crown Princess of Norway.
- Jørgen Moe (1813–1882), writer, folklorist (Asbjørnsen og Moe), poet, bishop of Kristiansand.
- Nicolai Tangen (1966), hedgefund investor, CEO of the Norwegian Sovereign Wealth Fund (NBIM) since 2020.
- Christian Rynning-Tønnesen (1959–), business leader, CEO of Norske Skog, Statkraft.
- Emanuel Vigeland (1875–1948), artist, sculptor, painter, creator of the Vigeland installation in Frogner Park in Oslo.
- Gustav Vigeland (1869–1945), artist, sculptor, painter.
- Henrik Wergeland (1808–1845), author, writer, playwright, educator, national archivar, bureaucrat, emancipator.

== See also ==
- Aust-Agder
- Sørlandet
- Agder
- Former municipalities of Vest-Agder
