= Juvatn =

Lake in Agder, Norway

- Gjuvvatnet (unofficial)
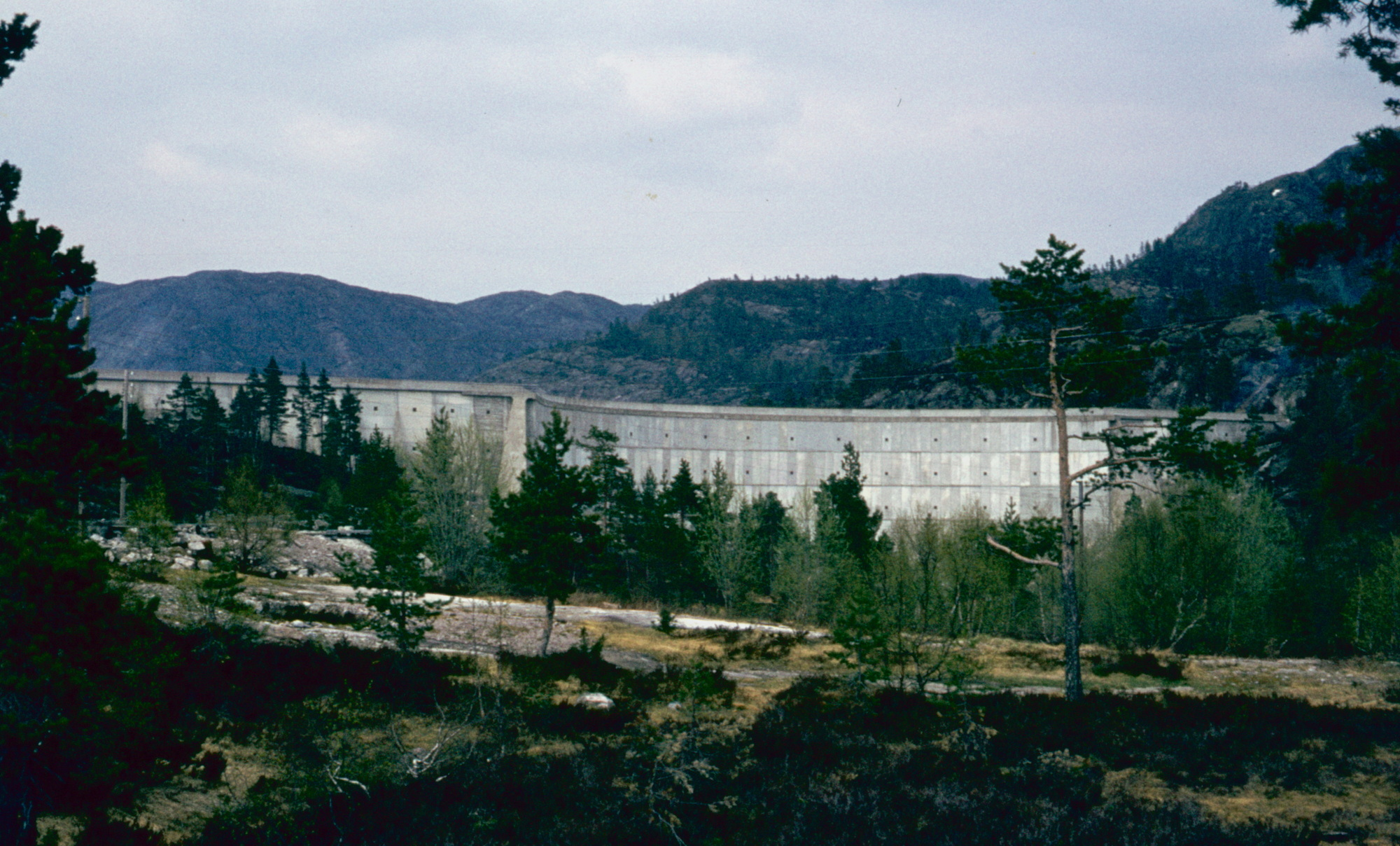
- View of the dam on the lake
- Interactive map of Juvatn
- Location: Åseral Municipality, Agder
- Coordinates: 58.82559°N 7.50886°E
- Basin countries: Norway
- Max. length: 6.2 kilometres (3.9 mi)
- Max. width: 2.4 kilometres (1.5 mi)
- Surface area: 8.06 km^{2} (3.11 sq mi)
- Shore length^{1}: 23.79 kilometres (14.78 mi)
- Surface elevation: 513 metres (1,683 ft)
- References: NVE
- ^{1} Shore length is not a well-defined measure.

Juvatn is a lake in Åseral Municipality in Agder county, Norway. The 8.06-square-kilometre (3.11 sq mi) lake lies on the river Logna in the upper part of the Mandalen valley. The lake is in the far northeastern part of the municipality, just over 1.2 kilometres (0.75 mi) south of the border with Bygland Municipality. The Bortelid ski area lies just west of the lake. There is a dam on the southern part of the lake to use the water as part of a hydro-electric power system in the region. The dam was built in 1958 as part of the Logna power system. The water ultimately flows into the river Mandalselva. The nearby lake Gyvatn lies about 8 kilometres (5.0 mi) southeast of Juvatn.

== See also ==
- List of lakes in Norway
