= Nåvatn =

Lake in Agder, Norway

- Nåvatnet
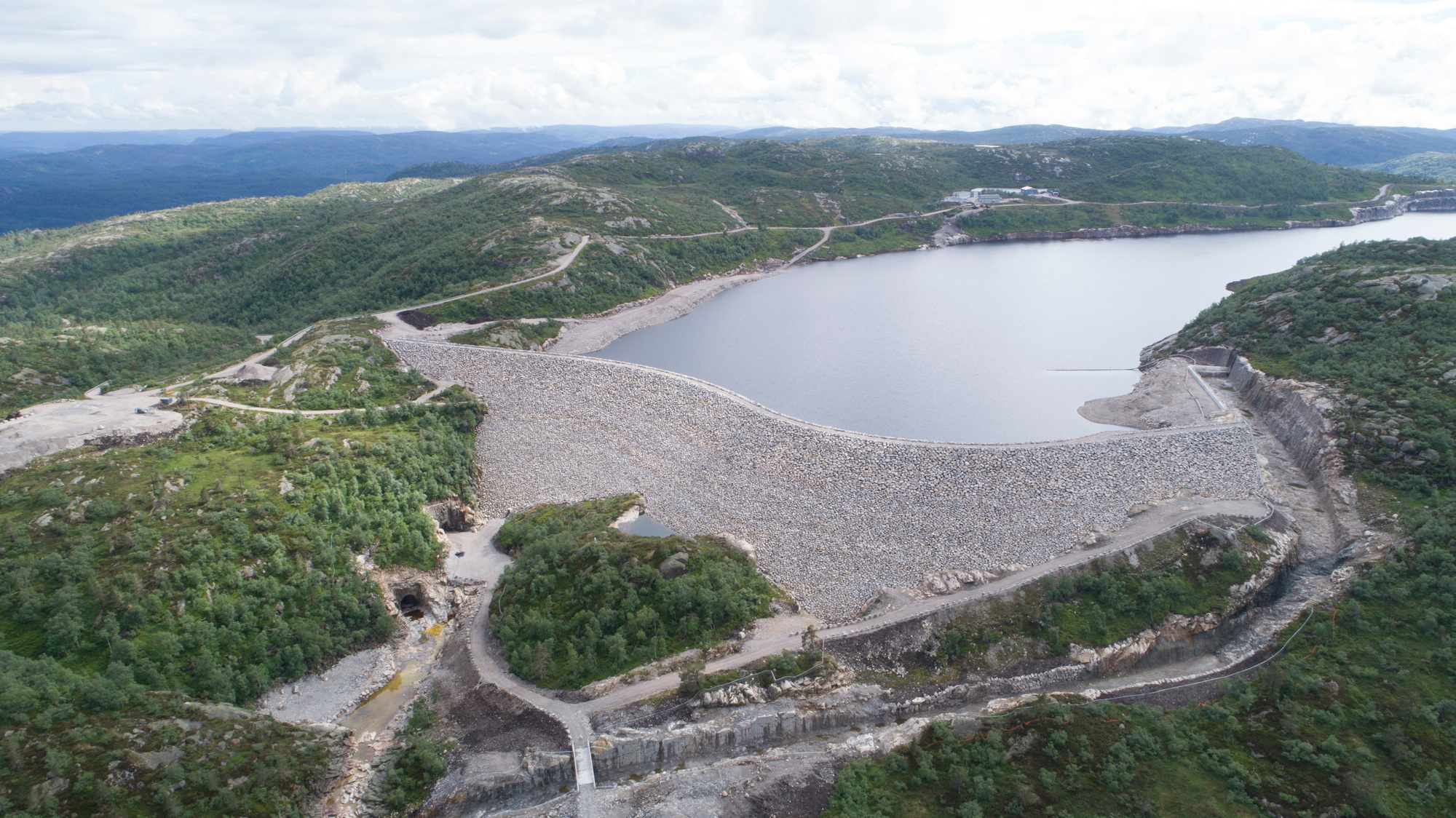
- View of the dam on the southeastern end of the lake
- Interactive map of Nåvatn
- Location: Åseral Municipality, Agder
- Coordinates: 58.58882°N 7.30662°E
- Basin countries: Norway
- Max. length: 15 kilometres (9.3 mi)
- Max. width: 1 kilometre (0.62 mi)
- Surface area: 6.65 km^{2} (2.57 sq mi)
- Shore length^{1}: 45.92 kilometres (28.53 mi)
- Surface elevation: 628 metres (2,060 ft)
- References: NVE
- ^{1} Shore length is not a well-defined measure.

Nåvatn is a lake in Åseral Municipality in Agder county, Norway. The 6.65-square-kilometre (2.57 sq mi) lake lies about 5 kilometres (3.1 mi) west of the village of Kyrkjebygda. The lake has four dams at various locations at the southern end for purposes of power generation at the nearby Skjerka power station. The lake is 15 kilometres (9.3 mi) long, but only about 1 kilometre (0.62 mi) wide at its widest point.

== See also ==
- List of lakes in Norway
