= Eikerapen Roots Festival =

Music festival in Norway

- Status: Active
- Genre: Festival
- Frequency: Annual
- Locations: Eikerapen, Norway
- Coordinates: 58°32′21″N 7°21′33″E
- Inaugurated: 2004
- Most recent: 2019
- Capacity: 4,000
- Website: https://eikerapen.com/

Eikerapen Roots Festival is traditional music festival held in Eikerapen in Åseral Municipality in Agder county, Norway. It has been running since August 2004. The 2014 festival was scheduled to run from 30 July to 3 August.

The festival used a stage under a dam until it had to be demolished. The last performance with the stage was by Green Carnation, in 2014. The festival received the Vest-Agder Bygdeutviklingsprisen (English: Rural Development Award) in 2011.

In 2019, it was reported that the festival may have to be discontinued for financial reasons.
