= Vennesla (disambiguation) =

Vennesla may refer to:

== Places ==
- Vennesla, an urban village within Vennesla Municipality in Agder county, Norway
- Vennesla Municipality, a municipality in Agder county, Norway
- Vennesla Church, a church in Vennesla Municipality in Agder county, Norway

== Other ==
- Vennesla Station, a railway station in Vennesla Municipality in Agder county, Norway
- Vennesla Tidende, a newspaper based in Vennesla Municipality in Agder county, Norway
