= Eikerapen =

Village in Åseral Municipality, Norway

Eikerapen Eikjerapen
- Village
- Interactive map of Eikerapen
- Coordinates: 58.53996°N 7.35998°E
- Country: Norway
- Region: Southern Norway
- County: Agder
- District: Lindesnes
- Municipality: Åseral Municipality
- Elevation: 336 m (1,102 ft)
- Time zone: UTC+01:00 (CET)
  - Summer (DST): UTC+02:00 (CEST)
- Post Code: 4544 Fossdal

Eikerapen is a village in Åseral Municipality in Agder county, Norway. The village is located on the southwestern shore of the lake Øre, about 10 kilometres (6.2 mi) south of the municipal centre of Kyrkjebygda.

Eikerapen has a popular ski resort that is open in the winter time, with ski lifts and many ski slopes. There are many holiday cottages in the village near the ski centre. Eikerapen Roots Festival is an annual international roots music festival, held at Eikerapen in August each year.
