= Ljosland =

Village in Åseral Municipality, Norway

- Village
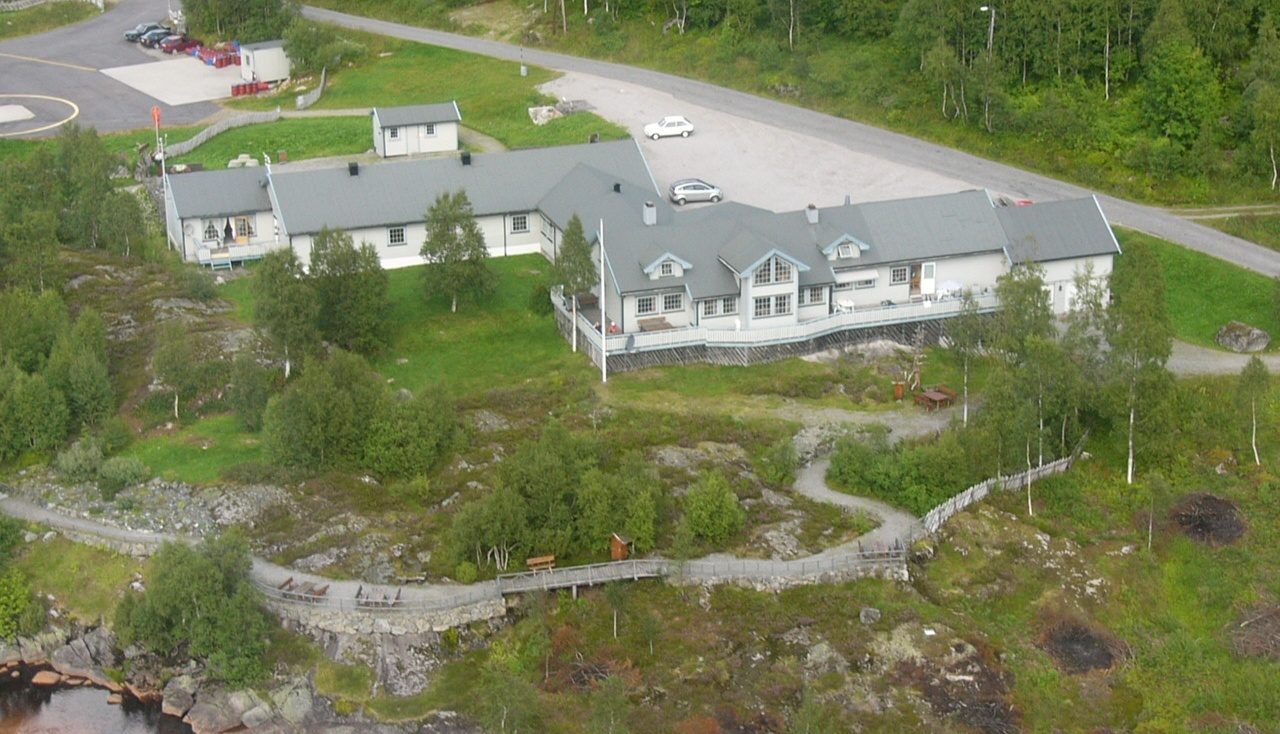
- View of a hotel in Ljosland
- Interactive map of Ljosland
- Coordinates: 58.78809°N 7.35304°E
- Country: Norway
- Region: Southern Norway
- County: Agder
- District: Lindesnes
- Municipality: Åseral Municipality
- Elevation: 510 m (1,670 ft)
- Time zone: UTC+01:00 (CET)
  - Summer (DST): UTC+02:00 (CEST)
- Post Code: 4540 Åseral

Ljosland is a village in Åseral Municipality in Agder county, Norway. The village is located at the northern end of the Monn river valley, about 20 kilometres (12 mi) north of the municipal centre of Kyrkjebygda. The lake Ljoslandsvatnet lies just south of the village.

Ljosland has a ski resort that is popular in the winter time, with ski lifts and many ski slopes. There are many holiday cottages located in the village. The Ljosland Fjellstove hotel was built here in 1937 and has served tourists since then. Ljosland Chapel was built in the village in 1959 to serve the residents in the northwestern part of Åseral Municipality.
