= Skofteland =

Village in Lindesnes Municipality, Norway

- Village
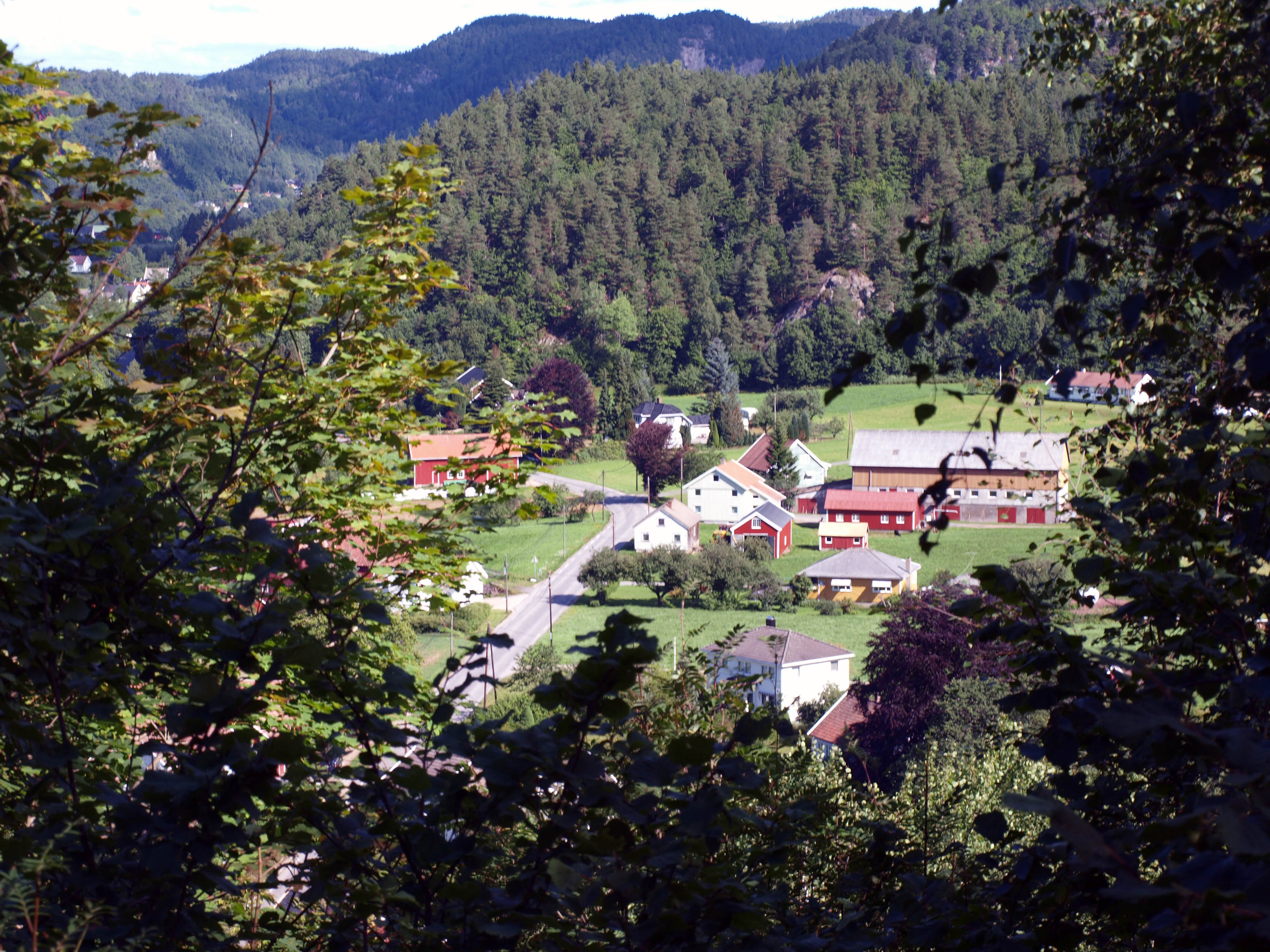
- View of the village
- Interactive map of Skofteland
- Coordinates: 58.10555°N 7.34291°E
- Country: Norway
- Region: Southern Norway
- County: Agder
- District: Lindesnes
- Municipality: Lindesnes Municipality
- Elevation: 8 m (26 ft)
- Time zone: UTC+01:00 (CET)
  - Summer (DST): UTC+02:00 (CEST)
- Post Code: 4520 Lindesnes

Skofteland is a village in Lindesnes Municipality in Agder county, Norway. The village is located along the river Audna, about 3 kilometres (1.9 mi) northeast of the municipal centre of Vigeland. From Skofteland, there is a road which runs to the northeast to Fuskeland, a small village to the north of the town of Mandal.
