= Åknes, Agder =

Village in Åseral Municipality, Norway

Åknes Lognevatn
- Village
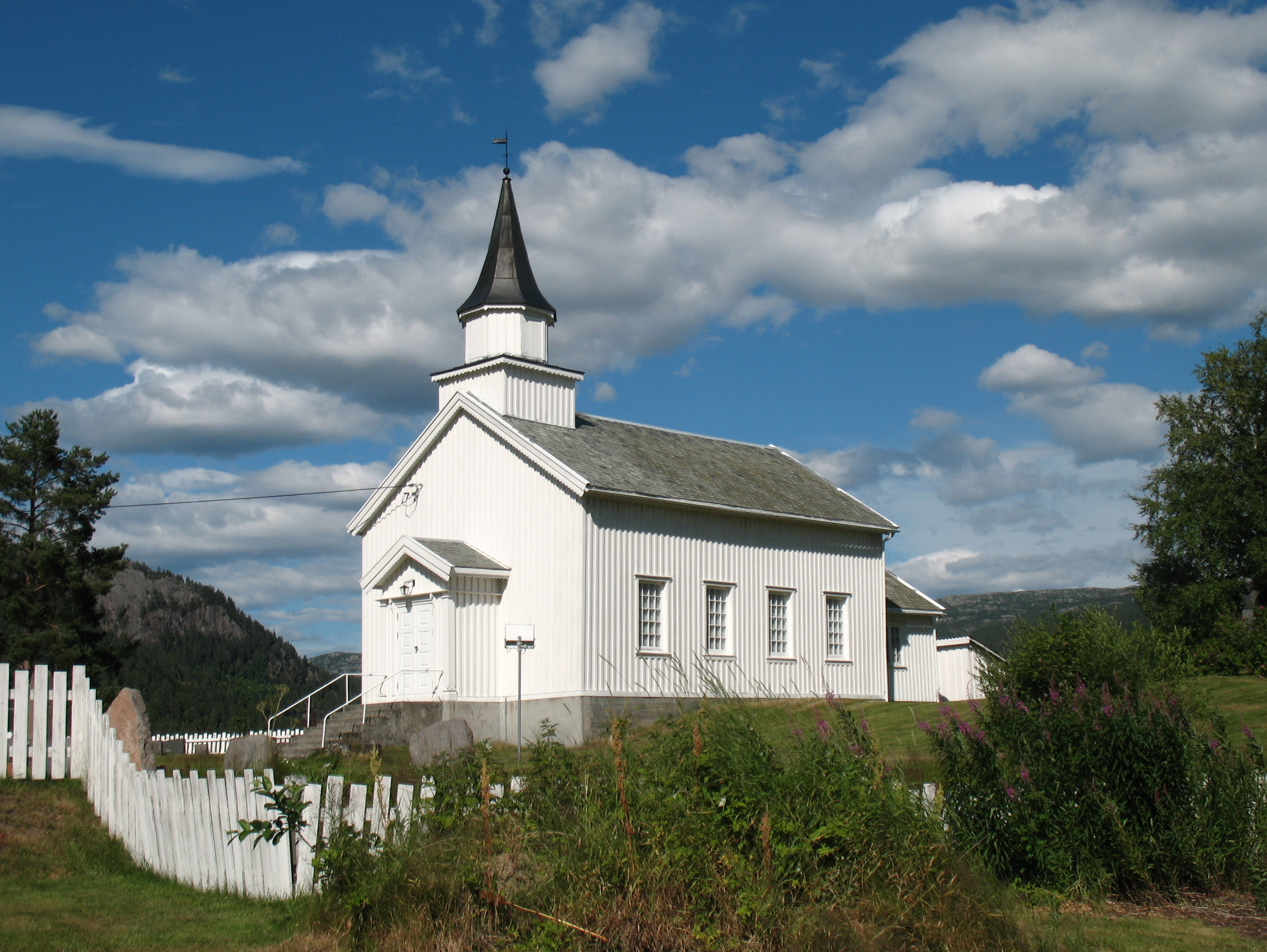
- View of the village chapel
- Interactive map of the village
- Coordinates: 58.75134°N 7.51418°E
- Country: Norway
- Region: Southern Norway
- County: Agder
- District: Lindesnes
- Municipality: Åseral Municipality
- Elevation: 359 m (1,178 ft)
- Time zone: UTC+01:00 (CET)
  - Summer (DST): UTC+02:00 (CEST)
- Post Code: 4540 Åseral

Åknes or Lognevatn is a village in Åseral Municipality in Agder county, Norway. The village is located in the northern part of the Logna river valley, about 18 kilometres (11 mi) northeast of the municipal centre of Kyrkjebygda. The village sits on the north shore of the lake Lognavatnet. The Åknes Chapel was built here in 1873 to serve the northern part of the municipality. The small village of Bortelid lies about 8 kilometres (5.0 mi) to the north.
