= Gyvatn =

Lake in Agder, Norway

- Interactive map of Gyvatn
- Location: Agder county, Norway
- Coordinates: 58.73266°N 7.64503°E
- Basin countries: Norway
- Max. length: 5 kilometres (3.1 mi)
- Max. width: 6 kilometres (3.7 mi)
- Surface area: 4.62 km^{2} (1.78 sq mi)
- Shore length^{1}: 40.73 kilometres (25.31 mi)
- Surface elevation: 563 metres (1,847 ft)
- References: NVE
- ^{1} Shore length is not a well-defined measure.

Gyvatn is a lake in Agder county, Norway. The lake straddles the borders of the three municipalities of Åseral, Bygland, and Evje og Hornnes. The 4.62-square-kilometre (1.78 sq mi) lake is located about 8 kilometres (5.0 mi) northwest of the village of Byglandsfjord and the lake Byglandsfjorden and it is about 7 kilometres (4.3 mi) east of the village of Åknes in Åseral Municipality.

== See also ==
- List of lakes in Norway
