= Jørgen Åsland =

Norwegian politician (born 1946)

Jørgen Åsland (born 1 November 1946) is a Norwegian politician for the Centre Party.

He served as a deputy representative to the Norwegian Parliament from Vest-Agder during the term 1993–1997.

On the local level he was the mayor of Åseral Municipality from 1991 to 2007. He was first elected to the municipal council of Åseral Municipality in 1979.
