= Øre (lake) =

Lake in Agder, Norway

Øre Ørevatn
- Interactive map of the lake
- Location: Åseral Municipality, Agder
- Coordinates: 58.56939°N 7.39178°E
- Primary inflows: Skjerka, Monn, and Logna
- Primary outflows: Mandalselva
- Basin countries: Norway
- Max. length: 9 kilometres (5.6 mi)
- Max. width: 750 metres (2,460 ft)
- Surface area: 3.82 km^{2} (1.47 sq mi)
- Shore length^{1}: 24.71 kilometres (15.35 mi)
- Surface elevation: 260 metres (850 ft)
- References: NVE
- ^{1} Shore length is not a well-defined measure.

Øre or Ørevatn is a lake in Åseral Municipality in Agder county, Norway. The 3.82-square-kilometre (1.47 sq mi) lake is located at the confluence of the rivers Logna and Monn at the village of Kyrkjebygda. Near the southern end of the lake, the river Mandalselva flows southwards. The village of Eikerapen lies along the southwestern shore of the lake.

== See also ==
- List of lakes in Norway
