= Åseral Church =

Church in Agder, Norway

- Åseral kyrkje
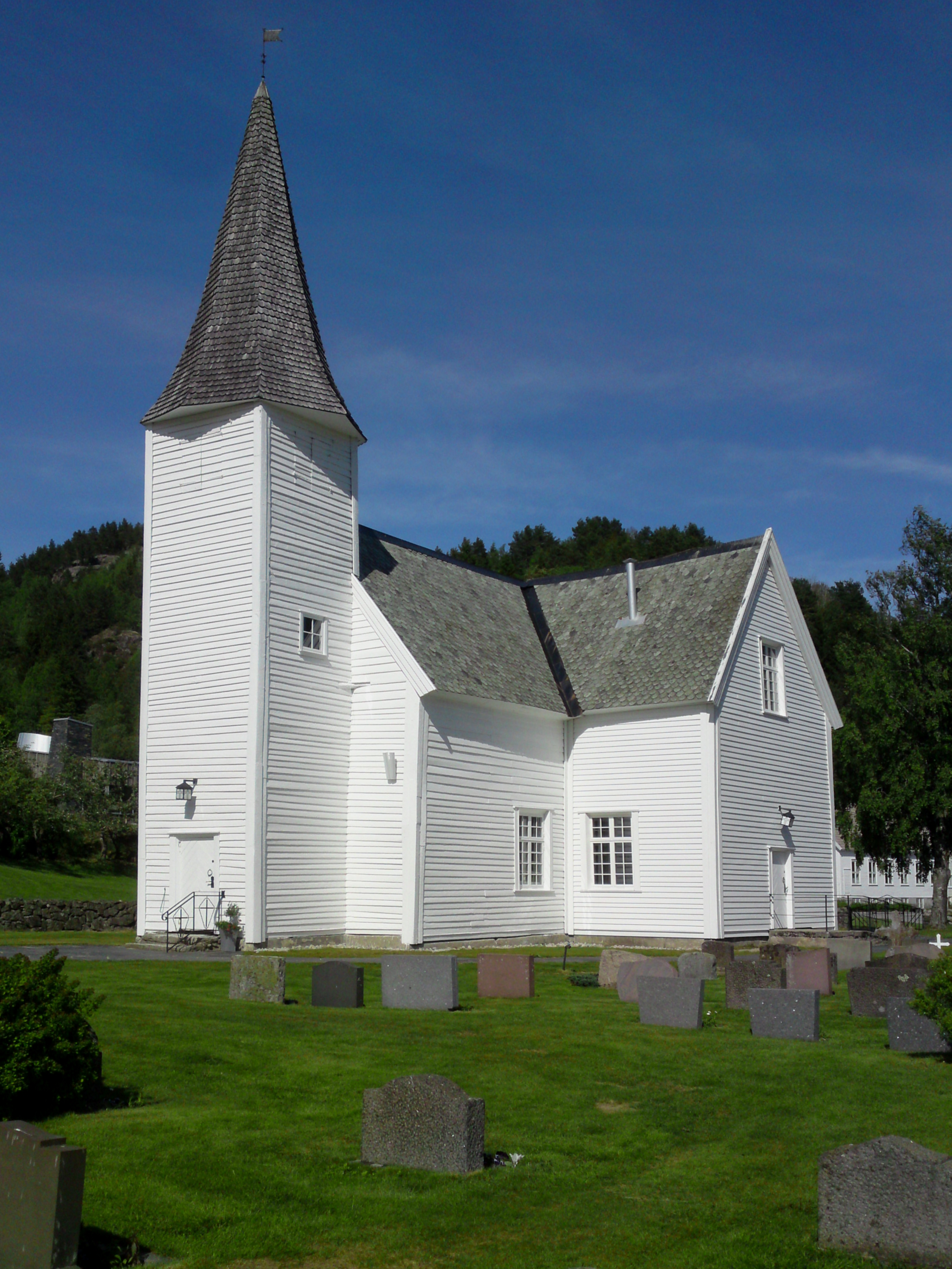
- View of the church
- Åseral Church
- 58.61738°N 07.41417°E
- Location: Åseral Municipality, Agder
- Country: Norway
- Denomination: Church of Norway
- Churchmanship: Evangelical Lutheran

History
- Former name: Åbø kirke (historic)
- Status: Parish church
- Founded: 13th century
- Consecrated: 1822

Architecture
- Functional status: Active
- Architect(s): Olav Aasland and Olav Bakken
- Architectural type: Cruciform
- Completed: 1822 (204 years ago)

Specifications
- Capacity: 300
- Materials: Wood

Administration
- Diocese: Agder og Telemark
- Deanery: Otredal prosti
- Parish: Åseral
- Norwegian Cultural Heritage Site
- Type: Church
- Status: Automatically protected
- ID: 85995

Åseral Church (Norwegian: Åseral kyrkje) is a parish church of the Church of Norway in Åseral Municipality in Agder county, Norway. It is located in the village of Kyrkjebygda. It is one of the churches for the Åseral parish which is part of the Otredal prosti (deanery) in the Diocese of Agder og Telemark. The white, wooden church was built in a cruciform design in 1822 using plans drawn up by the architects Olav Aasland and Olav Bakken. The church seats about 300 people.

== History ==
The earliest existing historical records of the church date back to the year 1328, but it was not new that year. The old church may have been a stave church that was possibly built in the 13th century. Historically, the church was named Aabø after the farm on which it was located (the more modern spelling of that in Norwegian would be Åbø). In 1705, the church was renovated and a new spire that was forged by Knut Gunnulvsen Mork was added to the top of the tower. The centuries-old church was torn down in 1822 and a new cruciform church was built on the same site. Some of the logs from the old church were reused to build the entry porch on the new church building.

== See also ==
- List of churches in Agder og Telemark
