= Ljosland Chapel =

Church in Agder, Norway

- Ljosland kapell
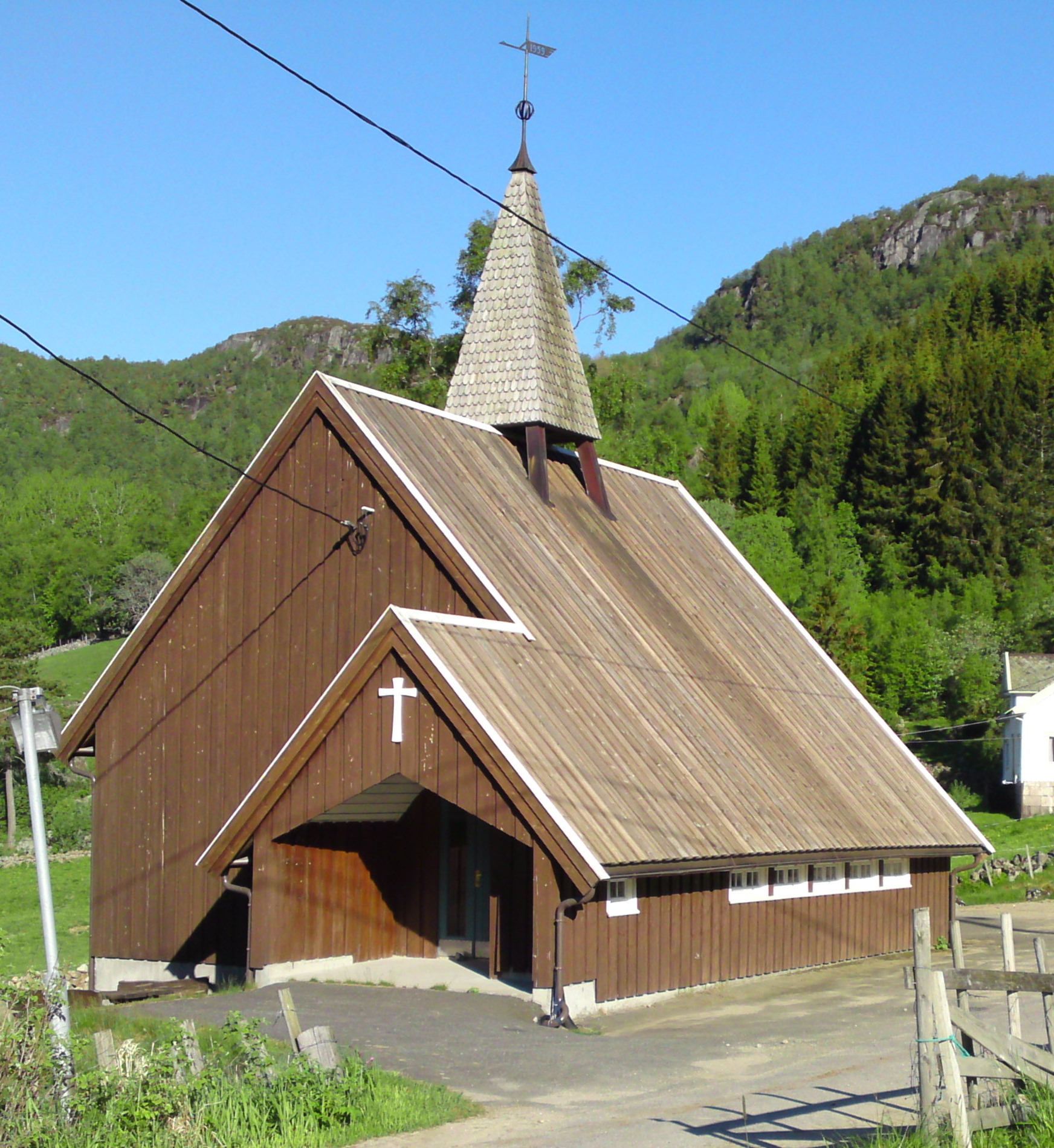
- View of the church
- Ljosland Chapel
- 58.7892°N 07.3510°E
- Location: Åseral Municipality, Agder
- Country: Norway
- Denomination: Church of Norway
- Churchmanship: Evangelical Lutheran

History
- Status: Parish church

Architecture
- Functional status: Active
- Architect: Alv Erikstad
- Architectural type: Long church
- Completed: 1959 (67 years ago)

Specifications
- Capacity: 95
- Materials: Wood

Administration
- Diocese: Agder og Telemark
- Deanery: Otredal prosti
- Parish: Åseral
- Norwegian Cultural Heritage Site
- Type: Church
- Status: Not protected
- ID: 84314

Ljosland Chapel (Norwegian: Ljosland kapell) is a parish church of the Church of Norway in Åseral Municipality in Agder county, Norway. It is located in the village of Ljosland. It is one of the churches for the Åseral parish which is part of the Otredal prosti (deanery) in the Diocese of Agder og Telemark. The brown, wooden church was built in a long church design in 1959 using plans drawn up by the architect Olav Erikstad. The church seats about 95 people.

== See also ==
- List of churches in Agder og Telemark
