= Harkmark Church =

Church in Agder, Norway

- Harkmark kirke
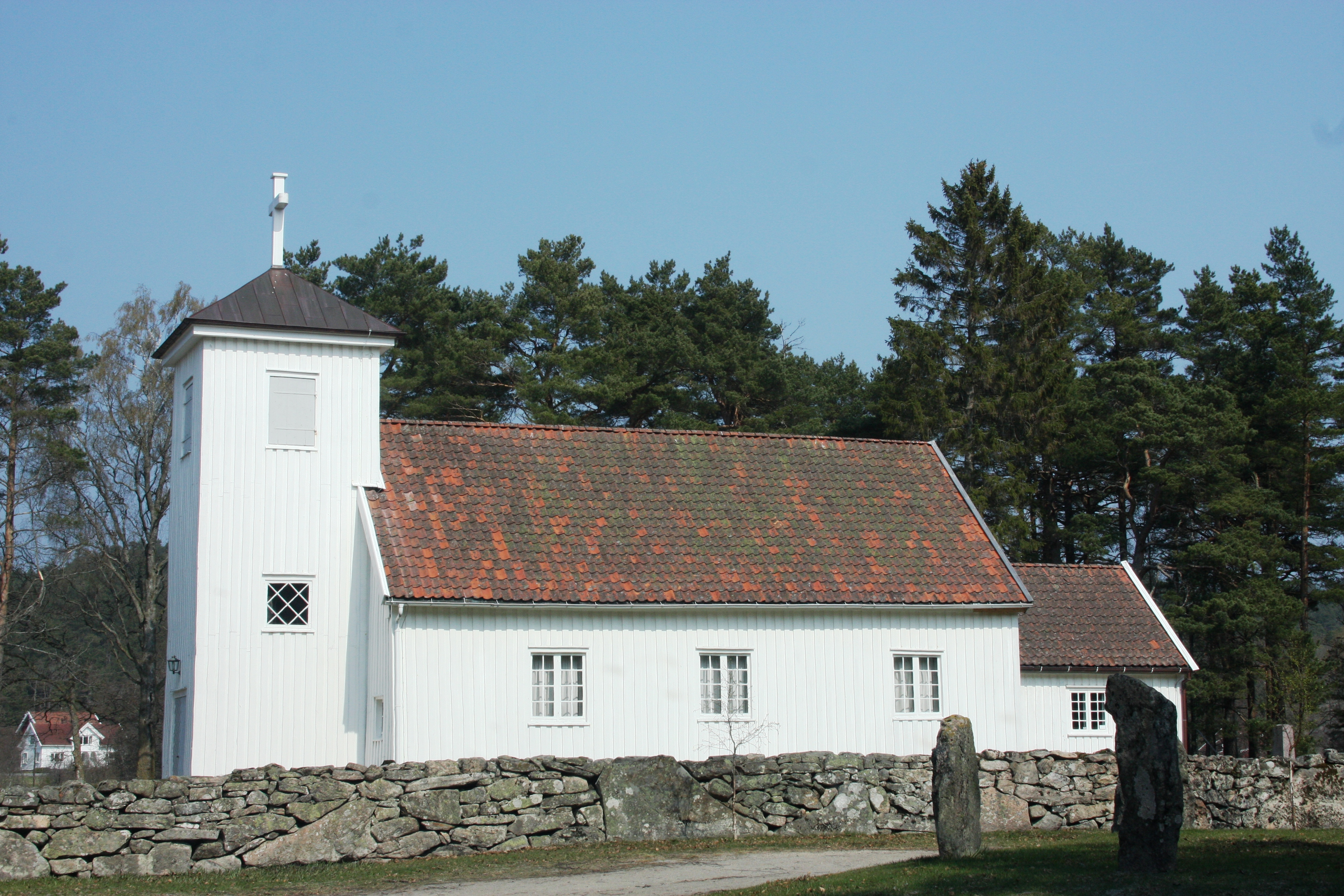
- View of the church
- Harkmark Church
- 58.043872°N 07.60564°E
- Location: Lindesnes Municipality, Agder
- Country: Norway
- Denomination: Church of Norway
- Churchmanship: Evangelical Lutheran

History
- Status: Parish church
- Founded: Viking Age
- Consecrated: 1613

Architecture
- Functional status: Active
- Architectural type: Long church
- Completed: 1613 (413 years ago)

Specifications
- Capacity: 135
- Materials: Wood

Administration
- Diocese: Agder og Telemark
- Deanery: Lister og Mandal prosti
- Parish: Mandal
- Norwegian Cultural Heritage Site
- Type: Church
- Status: Automatically protected
- ID: 84484

Harkmark Church (Norwegian: Harkmark kirke) is a parish church of the Church of Norway in Lindesnes Municipality in Agder county, Norway. It is located in the village of Harkmark. It is one of the two churches for the Mandal parish which is part of the Lister og Mandal prosti (deanery) in the Diocese of Agder og Telemark. The white, wooden church was built in a long church design in 1613 using plans drawn up by an unknown architect. The church seats about 135 people.

== History ==
The earliest existing historical records of the church date back to the year 1620, but the church was in existence much earlier. The church site has been in use since the Viking Age and it is the only church in Agder that was mentioned in the medieval Heimskringla. The church has a 4-metre (13 ft) wide circle of six large stones sitting just next to the church. The present church was built in 1613 when the majority of the previous church was torn down, leaving most of the old choir intact and then a new church building was built onto the existing choir.

In 1814, this church served as an election church (Norwegian: valgkirke). Together with more than 300 other parish churches across Norway, it was a polling station for elections to the 1814 Norwegian Constituent Assembly which wrote the Constitution of Norway. This was Norway's first national elections. Each church parish was a constituency that elected people called "electors" who later met together in each county to elect the representatives for the assembly that was to meet at Eidsvoll Manor later that year.

In 1830, a painting of the Virgin Mary by the famous artist Rembrandt which hung in the church was stolen.

In 1845, the church underwent a large renovation. The old choir which was originally narrower and had a lower roof line than the nave was torn down and a new choir was built so that it had the same width and roof line as the existing nave. The nave also got a new ceiling and the tower above the main entrance was built. New, larger windows were installed in the church as well. The timber walls in the church room were probably unpainted originally, but they were covered with white panels during this renovation. When the church was restored in 1972-1975, under the leadership of C.A. Christensen, the white painted panels were removed from the walls leaving the natural wood walls and the painted drapes on the west wall under the organ gallery were recreated.

== Media gallery ==
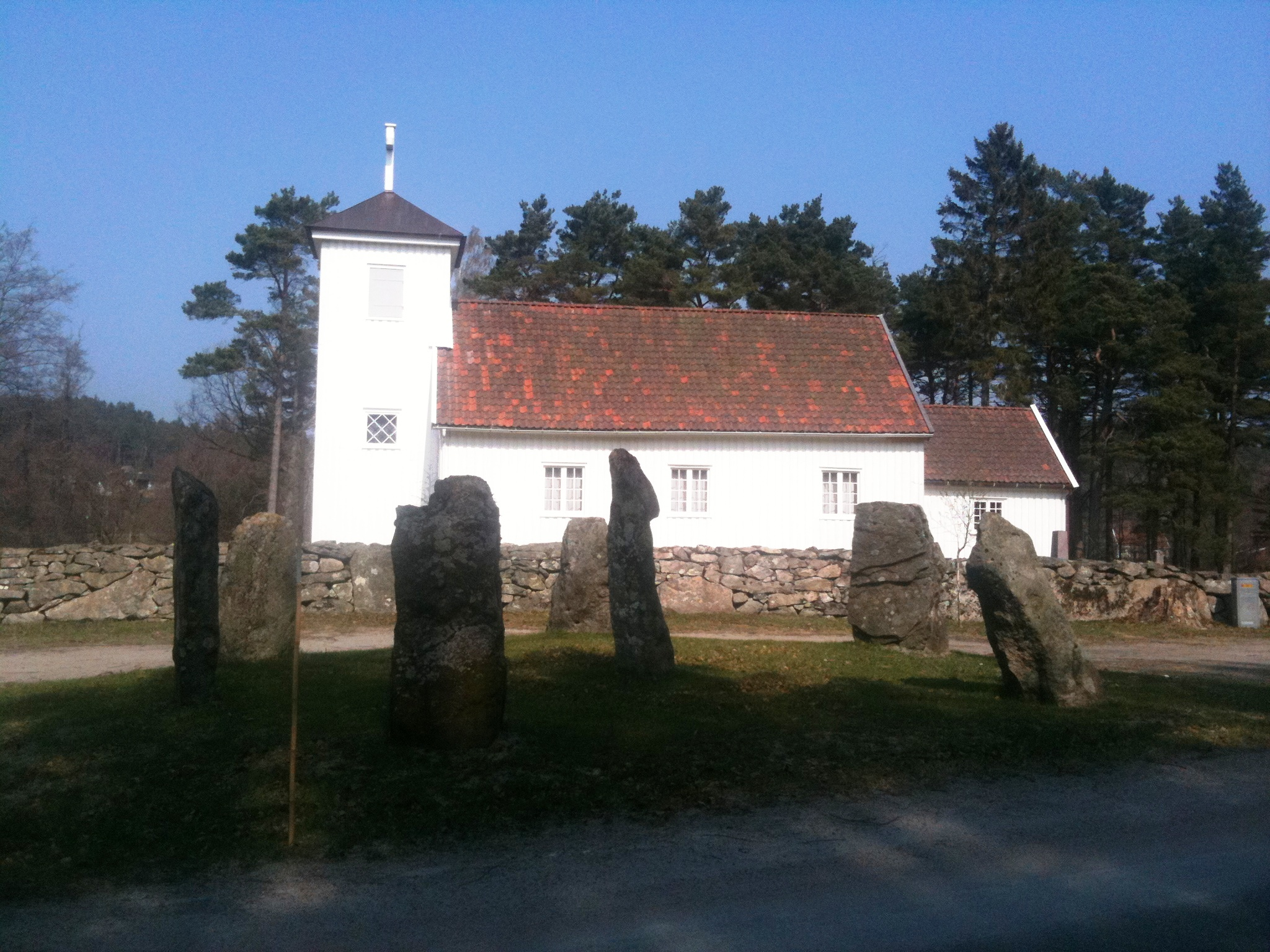

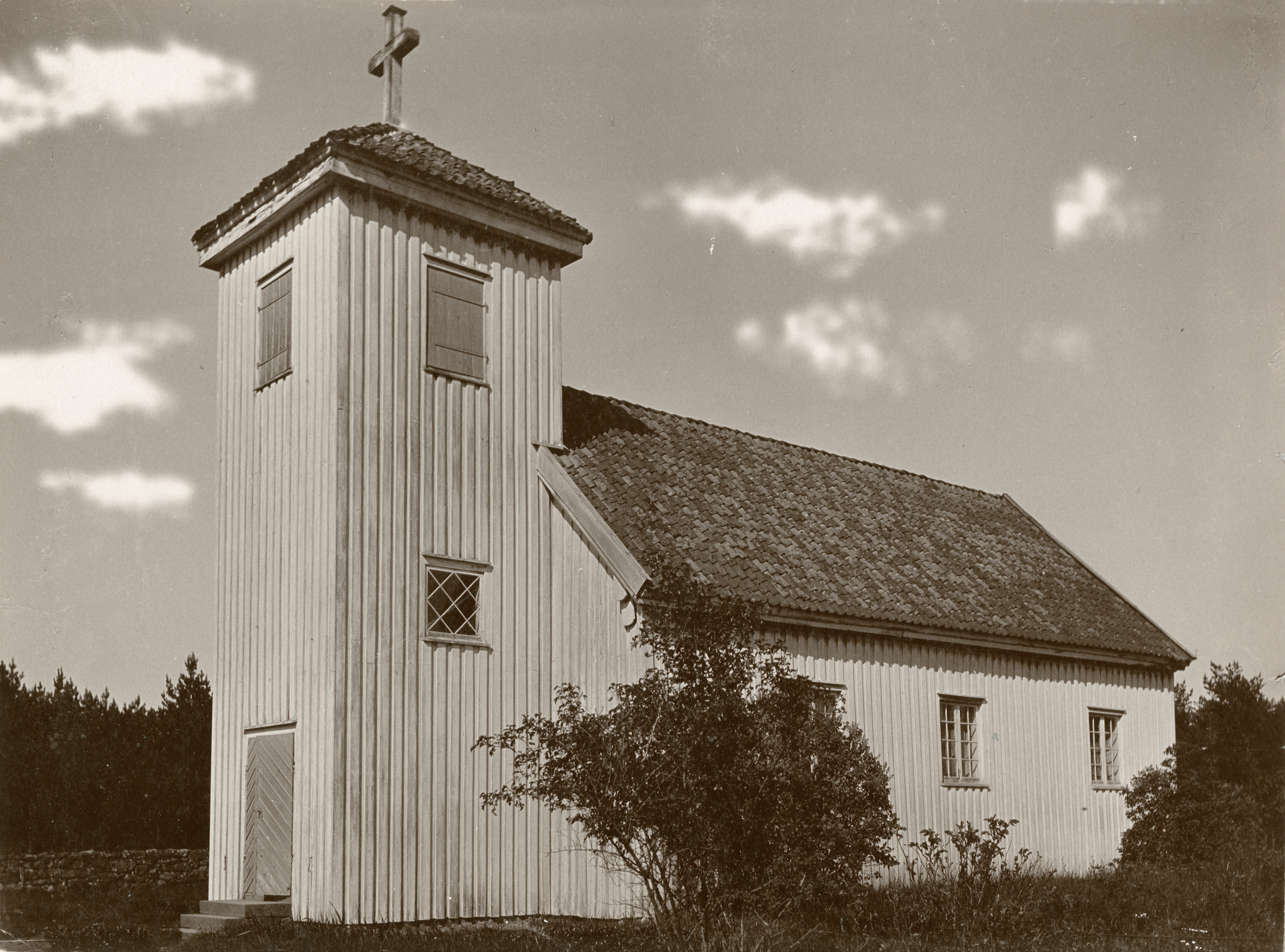

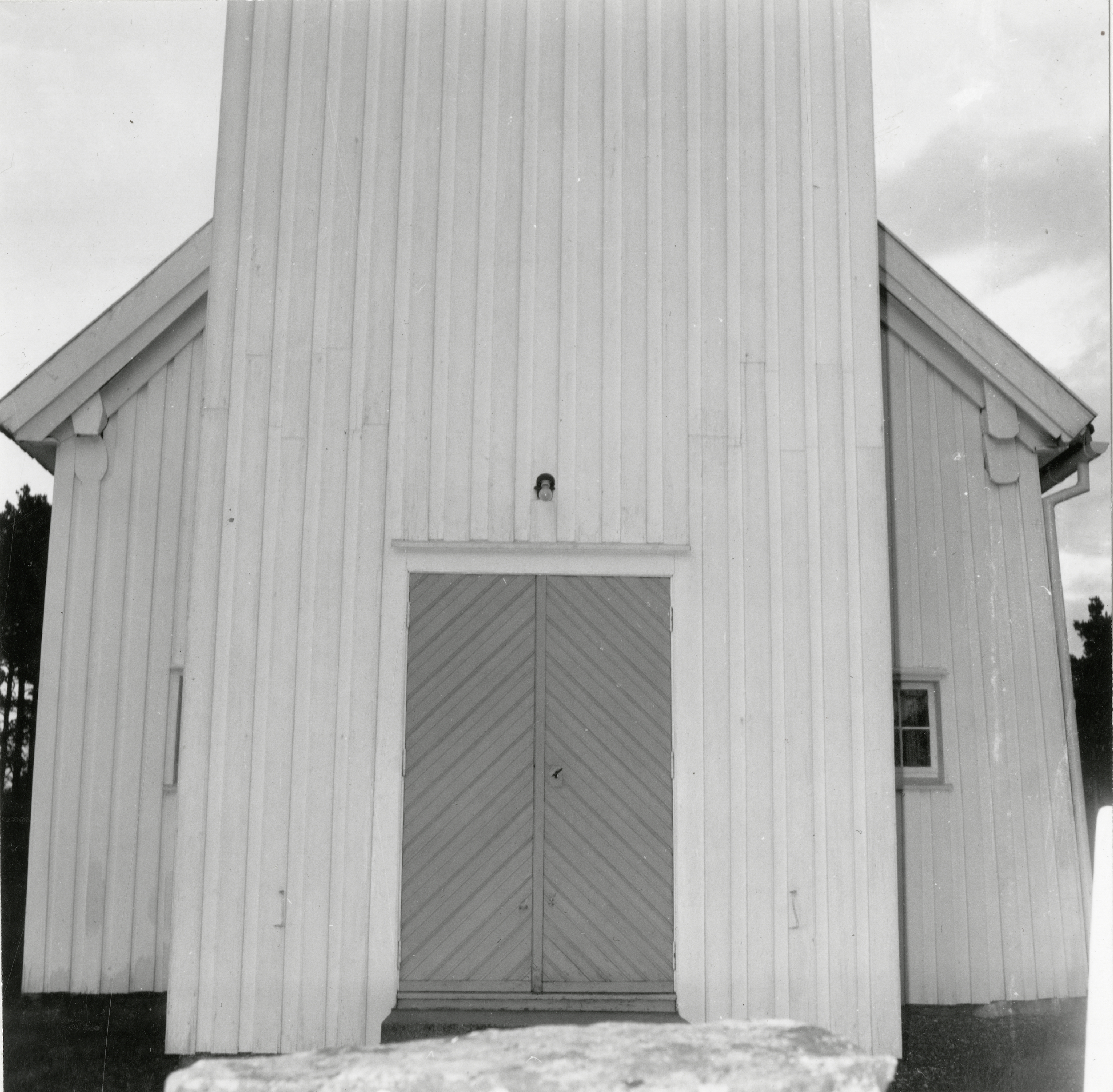

== See also ==
- List of churches in Agder og Telemark
