= Åknes Chapel =

Church in Agder, Norway

- Åknes kapell
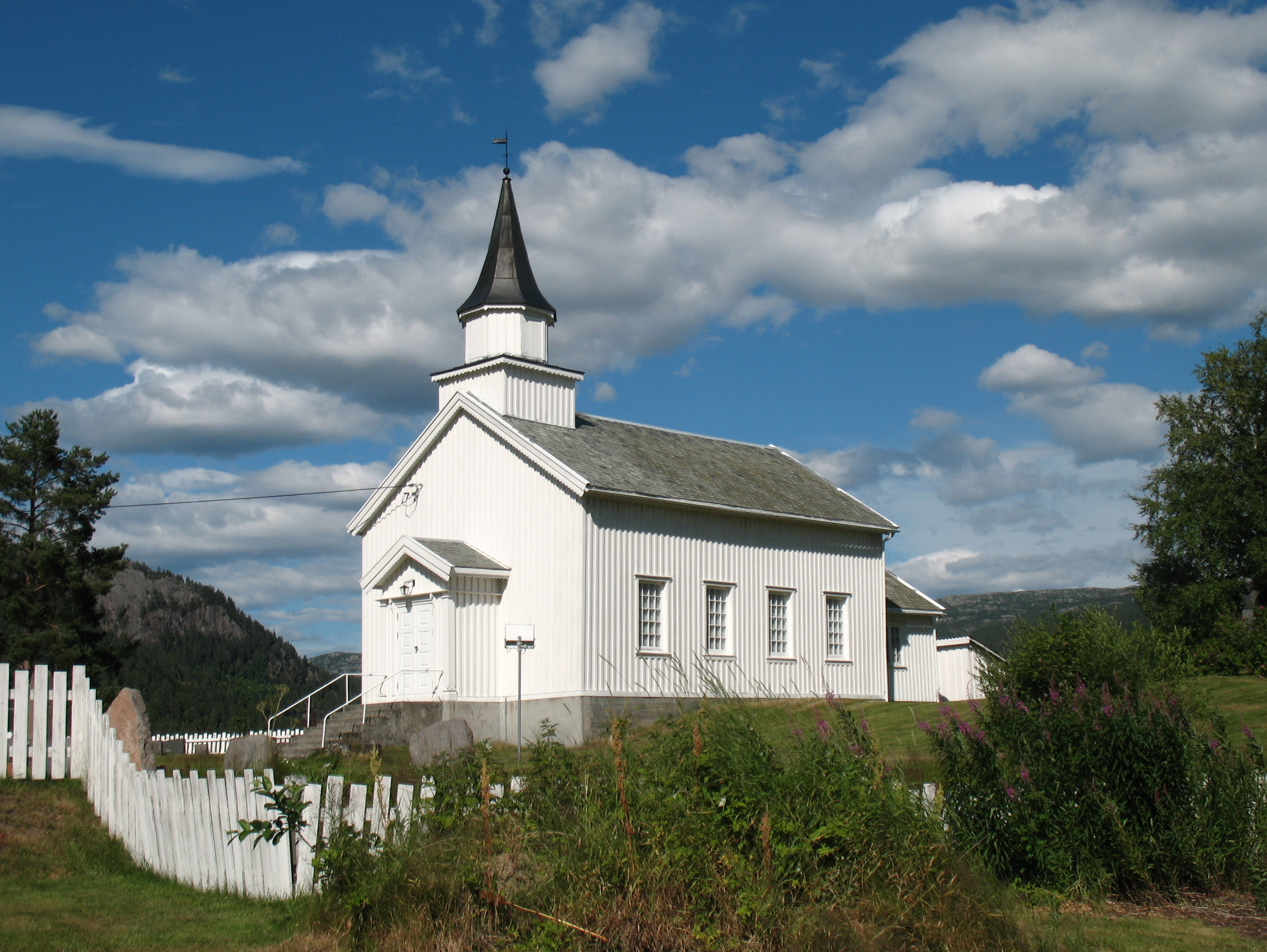
- View of the church
- Åknes Chapel
- 58.7497°N 07.5174°E
- Location: Åseral Municipality, Agder
- Country: Norway
- Denomination: Church of Norway
- Churchmanship: Evangelical Lutheran

History
- Status: Parish church
- Founded: c. 1250
- Consecrated: 1873
- Events: Closed (c. 1500s-1873)

Architecture
- Functional status: Active
- Architect(s): Tobias Flottorp and Gård Ekså
- Architectural type: Rectangular
- Completed: 1873 (153 years ago)

Specifications
- Capacity: 150
- Materials: Wood

Administration
- Diocese: Agder og Telemark
- Deanery: Otredal prosti
- Parish: Åseral
- Norwegian Cultural Heritage Site
- Type: Church
- Status: Not protected
- ID: 85951

Åknes Church (Norwegian: Åknes kirke) is a parish church of the Church of Norway in Åseral Municipality, Agder county, Norway. It is located in the village of Åknes. It is one of the churches for the Åseral parish which is part of the Otredal prosti (deanery) in the Diocese of Agder og Telemark. The white, wooden church was built in a rectangular design in 1873 using plans drawn up by the architects Tobias Flottorp and Gård Ekså. The church seats about 150 people.

== History ==
The earliest existing historical records of the church date back to the year 1328, but the church was not new that year. The original church was likely built around the year 1250. It was a rectangular church building and it was located about 400 metres (1,300 ft) north of the present site of the church. Archaeological evidence suggests the church sat in an east-west orientation and measured roughly 7 by 4 metres (23 ft × 13 ft). Historical records show that the church likely closed after the Black Death and was no longer used. By the 1600s, there was no church remaining.

As Åseral gained population, the people in the northern part of the municipality wanted their own chapel. Road connections were poor in Åseral in the middle of the 19th century, and there was a real need for a separate church building in the upper part of the municipality. However, the people around the lake Lognevatnet had to fight a long battle before the chapel was ready for use. Neither the parish priest nor the municipality as a whole supported their desire for a separate chapel. But the residents never gave up and their new chapel was completed in the autumn of 1873. When they built the new church, it was decided that the church site should be located about 400 metres (1,300 ft) to the south of the medieval church site. The new site was still on the shore of the lake Lognevatnet, but in a flatter, less rocky area. The new church was consecrated in 1873 and a small graveyard was built surrounding the building.

== See also ==
- List of churches in Agder og Telemark
