= Vennesla Church =

Church in Agder, Norway

- Vennesla kirke
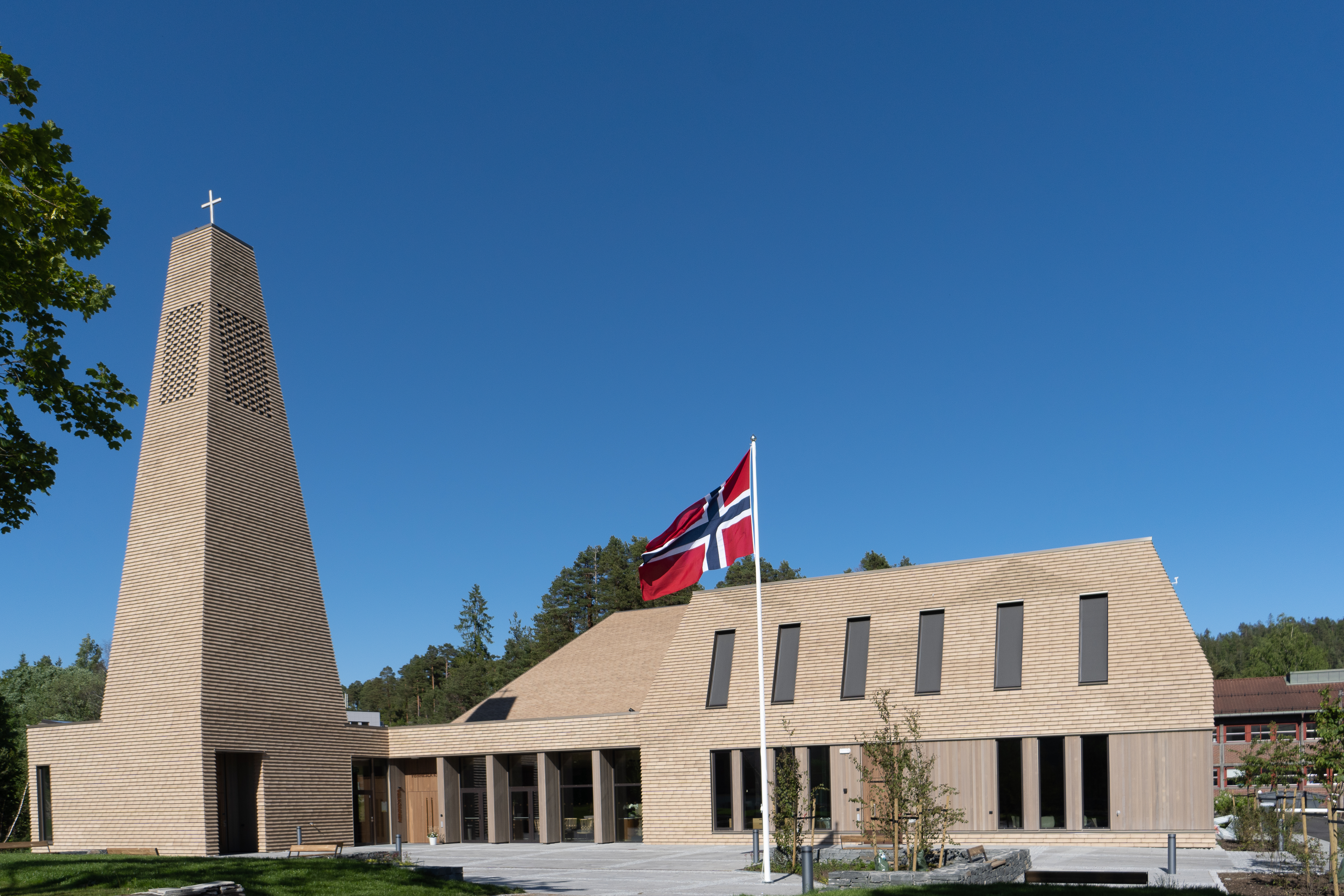
- View of the church Credit: Jon Østby
- Vennesla Church
- 58°16′34″N 7°58′13″E
- Location: Vennesla Municipality, Agder
- Country: Norway
- Denomination: Church of Norway
- Churchmanship: Evangelical Lutheran

History
- Status: Parish church
- Founded: 2021
- Consecrated: 3 April 2022

Architecture
- Functional status: Active
- Architect: LINK Architecture
- Architectural type: Long church
- Completed: 2021 (5 years ago)

Specifications
- Capacity: 600
- Materials: Brick

Administration
- Diocese: Agder og Telemark
- Deanery: Otredal prosti
- Parish: Vennesla

Vennesla Church (Norwegian: Vennesla kirke) is a parish church of the Church of Norway in Vennesla Municipality in Agder county, Norway. It is located in the village of Vennesla. It is the church for the Vennesla parish which is part of the Otredal prosti (deanery) in the Diocese of Agder og Telemark. The church is also the seat of the provost of the Otredal prosti. The brown brick and concrete church was built in a long church design in 2022 using plans drawn up by the architectural firm: LINK Architecture. The church seats about 600 people (nearly three times the capacity of the Old Vennesla Church).

== History ==
The church was consecrated on 3 April 2022 by the bishop Stein Reinertsen. This new building was built to replace the Old Vennesla Church which was over 200 years old and too small for the parish. The new building has a total area of 2,300 square metres (25,000 ft^{2}) in addition to an 800-square-metre (8,600 ft^{2}) lower level. The building has a kitchen, church office, children's and youth center, and a quiet room.

The building was commissioned by the Vennesla Church Council and cost a total of 76 million kr. It was designed by LINK architects after an open competition. In connection with the planning, a delegation studied churches in Rogaland county (including Ålgård Church and Bogafjell Church) and in Eastern Norway, among others. The structure consists of steel and concrete (which are exposed in some places). The exterior of the church is clad with ceramic tiles made especially for this building. The interior walls are partly clad with oak panels. The floors are largely covered with terrazzo tiles. Heating is provided by a geothermal heat pump based on wells drilled in the ground. The altarpiece is made by Tor Lindrupsen.

== See also ==
- List of churches in Agder og Telemark
