= Bortelid =

Village in Åseral Municipality, Norway

Bortelid Borteli
- Village
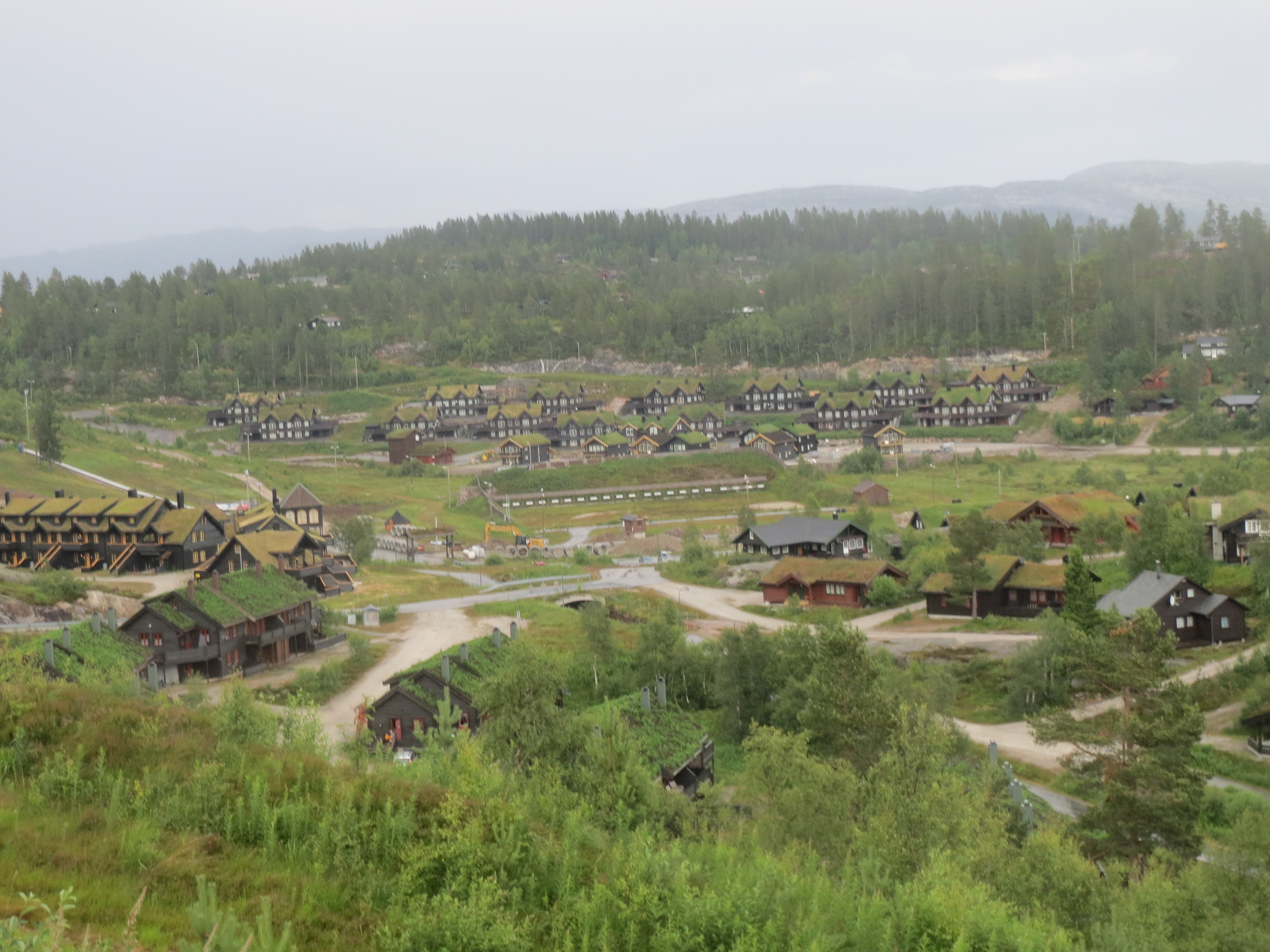
- Holiday cottages and accommodation houses in Bortelid with peat on the roofs.
- Interactive map of Bortelid
- Coordinates: 58.81845°N 7.46606°E
- Country: Norway
- Region: Southern Norway
- County: Agder
- District: Lindesnes
- Municipality: Åseral Municipality
- Elevation: 568 m (1,864 ft)
- Time zone: UTC+01:00 (CET)
  - Summer (DST): UTC+02:00 (CEST)
- Post Code: 4540 Åseral

Bortelid is a village in Åseral Municipality in Agder county, Norway. The village is located on the west side of the lake Juvatn in the northeastern part of the municipality. The mountainous areas of Bortelid is part of Setesdalsheiene mountains, and it contains one of the southernmost ski resorts in Norway (one of three ski centres in Åseral). The area is also full of holiday cottages—over 1000 cottages and apartments. Historically, Bortelid was a remote valley that was used for some small dairy farming operations, but today the economy centres around tourism and the outdoor recreation at the ski centre.

There is also a biathlon arena and cross country skiing trails. Bortelid has daily buses and ski buses on Saturdays during the winter season. Bortelid is also used in the summer for activities like mountain hiking, fishing, swimming, canoeing, and mountain bike riding.
