= Old Vennesla Church =

Church in Agder, Norway

- Vennesla gamle kirke
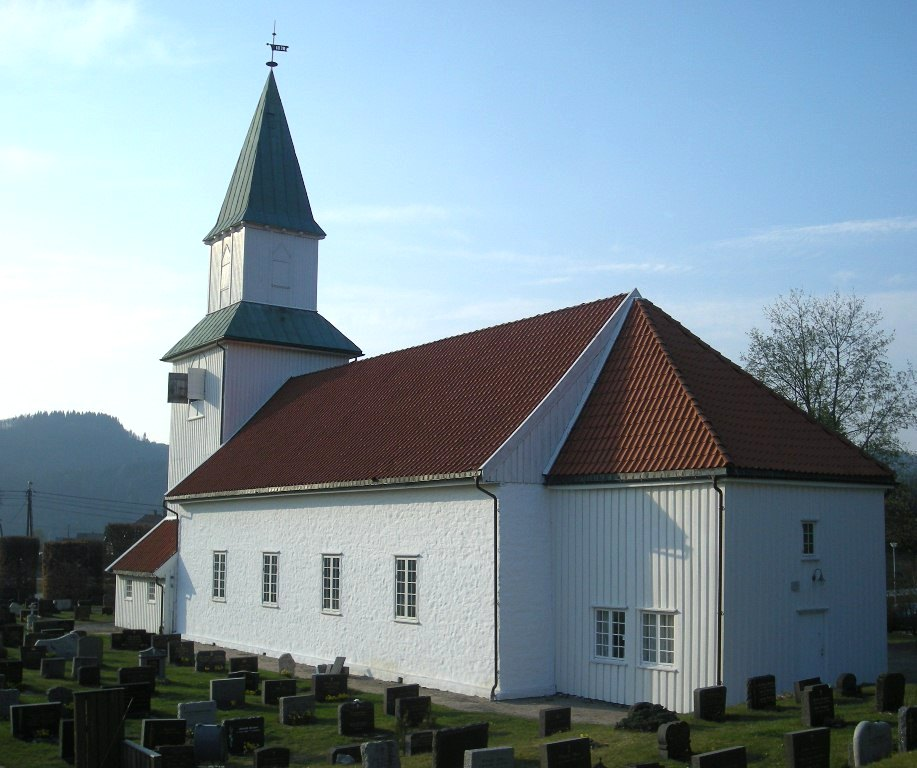
- View of the church
- Old Vennesla Church
- 58.27616°N 07.969932°E
- Location: Vennesla Municipality, Agder
- Country: Norway
- Denomination: Church of Norway
- Previous denomination: Catholic Church
- Churchmanship: Evangelical Lutheran

History
- Former name: Vennesla kirke
- Status: Parish church
- Founded: Middle Ages
- Consecrated: 22 Aug 1830

Architecture
- Functional status: Active
- Architectural type: Long church
- Completed: 1830 (196 years ago)

Specifications
- Capacity: 240
- Materials: Stone

Administration
- Diocese: Agder og Telemark
- Deanery: Otredal prosti
- Parish: Vennesla
- Norwegian Cultural Heritage Site
- Type: Church
- Status: Automatically protected
- ID: 85804

Old Vennesla Church (Norwegian: Vennesla gamle kirke) is a parish church of the Church of Norway in Vennesla Municipality in Agder county, Norway. It is located in the village of Vennesla. It is one of the churches for the Vennesla parish which is part of the Otredal prosti (deanery) in the Diocese of Agder og Telemark. The white, stone church was built in a long church design in 1830 using plans drawn up by an unknown architect. The church seats about 240 people. Since the new Vennesla Church was completed in 2022, this church building has only been used for smaller occasions and special events.

== History ==
The earliest existing historical records of the church date to the year 1620, but the church was pretty old at that time. At that time, the church had 2 bells which were described as "almost useless" plus several very old pieces of furniture in the building. In 1638, a new, small, wooden church was built on the same site. By the 1820s, the church was too small and in need of expansion or replacement. After many issues arising from the new location, type of materials to use, lack of money, difficulty in transporting materials, and issues with the workers, construction began in 1829 on a site just east of the old church. The new stone church was consecrated on 22 August 1830. Afterwards, the old church was torn down (the old church site was between the present church and the current road). The main nave and choir were made of stone and the entry and tower on the west and sacristy in the east were constructed out of wood. In 1886, the tower was reconstructed and heightened (although this was a controversial change).

In 2018, work on planning for a new Vennesla Church began. Construction began in 2019 on a site immediately to the east of the old church. The new church was completed and consecrated in the spring of 2022. The new church is now used regularly with this church being used only for smaller events and special occasions.

== See also ==
- List of churches in Agder og Telemark
