= Åseral Municipality =

Municipality in Agder, Norway

Åseral Municipality Åseral kommune
- Municipality
- Aaseral herred (historic name); Aaserald herred (historic name)
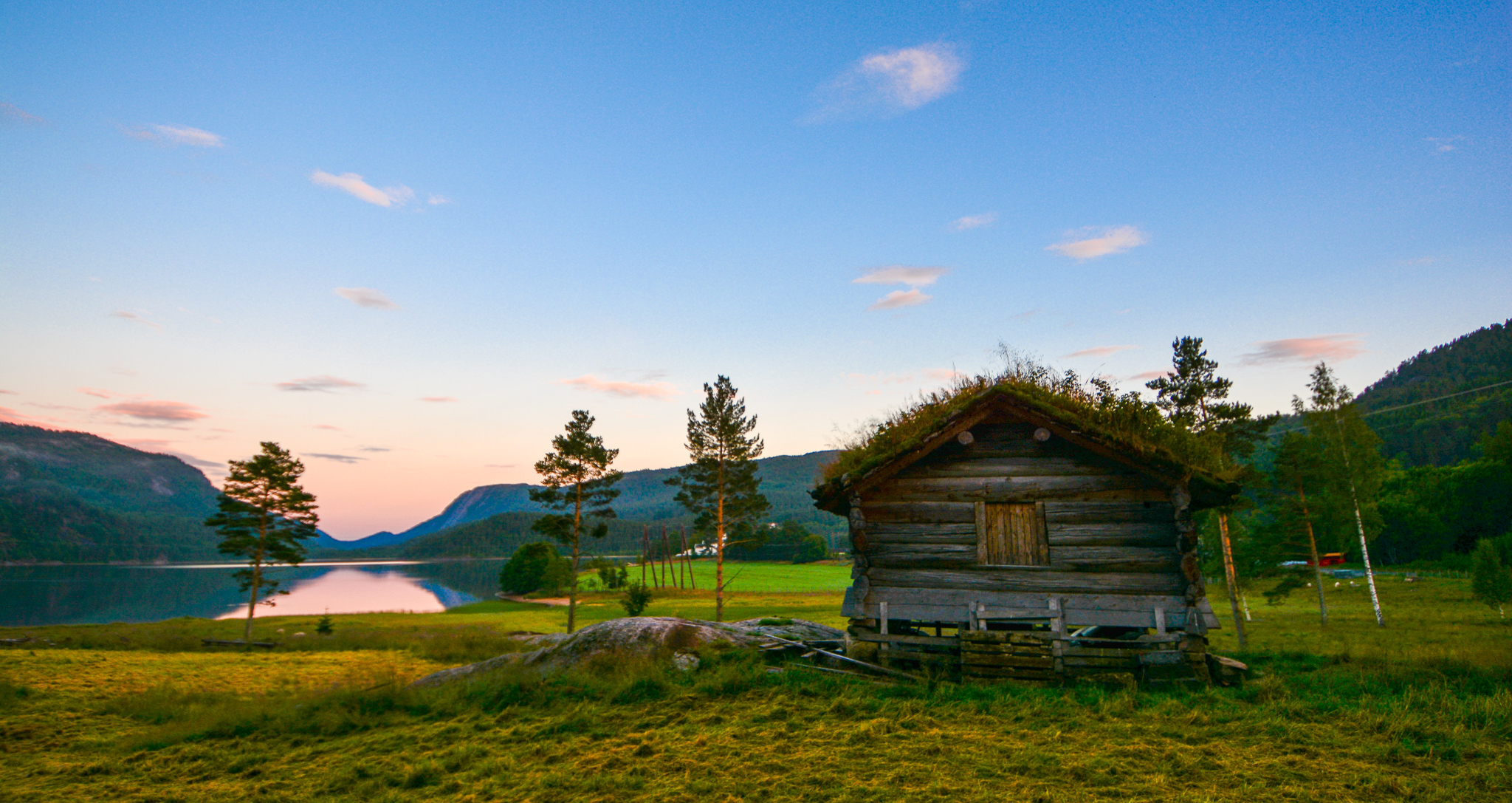
- View of the Åknes area

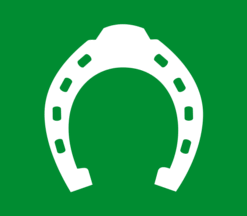
- Flag Coat of arms

- Agder within Norway

- Åseral within Agder
- Coordinates: 58°42′07″N 07°23′37″E
- Country: Norway
- County: Agder
- District: Sørlandet
- Established: 1 Jan 1838
  - Created as: Formannskapsdistrikt
- Administrative centre: Kyrkjebygda

Government
  - Mayor (2019): Inger Lise Lund Stulien (Ap)

Area
  - Total: 887.51 km^{2} (342.67 sq mi)
  - Land: 796.98 km^{2} (307.72 sq mi)
  - Water: 90.53 km^{2} (34.95 sq mi) 10.2%
  - Rank: #131 in Norway
- Highest elevation: 1,041.27 m (3,416.2 ft)

Population (2026)
  - Total: 904
  - Rank: #341 in Norway
  - Density: 1.1/km^{2} (2.8/sq mi)
  - Change (10 years): ▼ −4%
- Demonym: Åsdøl

Official language
  - Norwegian form: Nynorsk
- Time zone: UTC+01:00 (CET)
  - Summer (DST): UTC+02:00 (CEST)
- ISO 3166 code: NO-4224
- Website: Official website

Åseral is a municipality in Agder county, Norway. It is in the traditional district of Sørlandet. The administrative centre of the municipality is the village of Kyrkjebygda. Other villages in Åseral include Bortelid, Eikerapen, Kylland, Ljosland, and Lognevatn.

The 887.51-square-kilometre (342.67 sq mi) municipality is the 131st largest by area out of the 357 municipalities in Norway. Åseral Municipality is the 341st most populous municipality in Norway with a population of 904. The municipality's population density is 1.1 inhabitants per square kilometre (2.8/sq mi) and its population has decreased by 4% over the previous 10-year period.

== General information ==
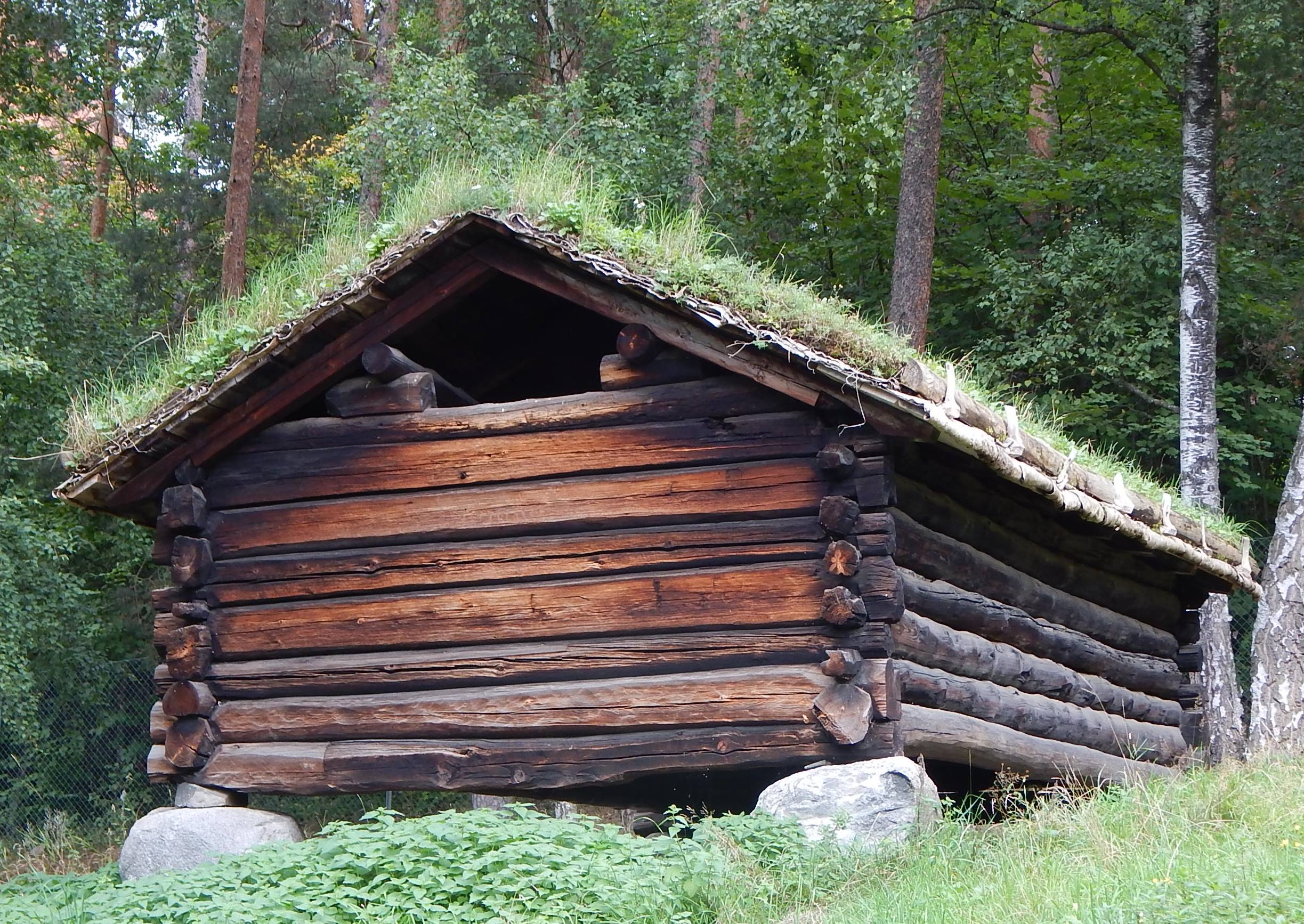
The local folk museum in Åseral has preserved many historic farm buildings

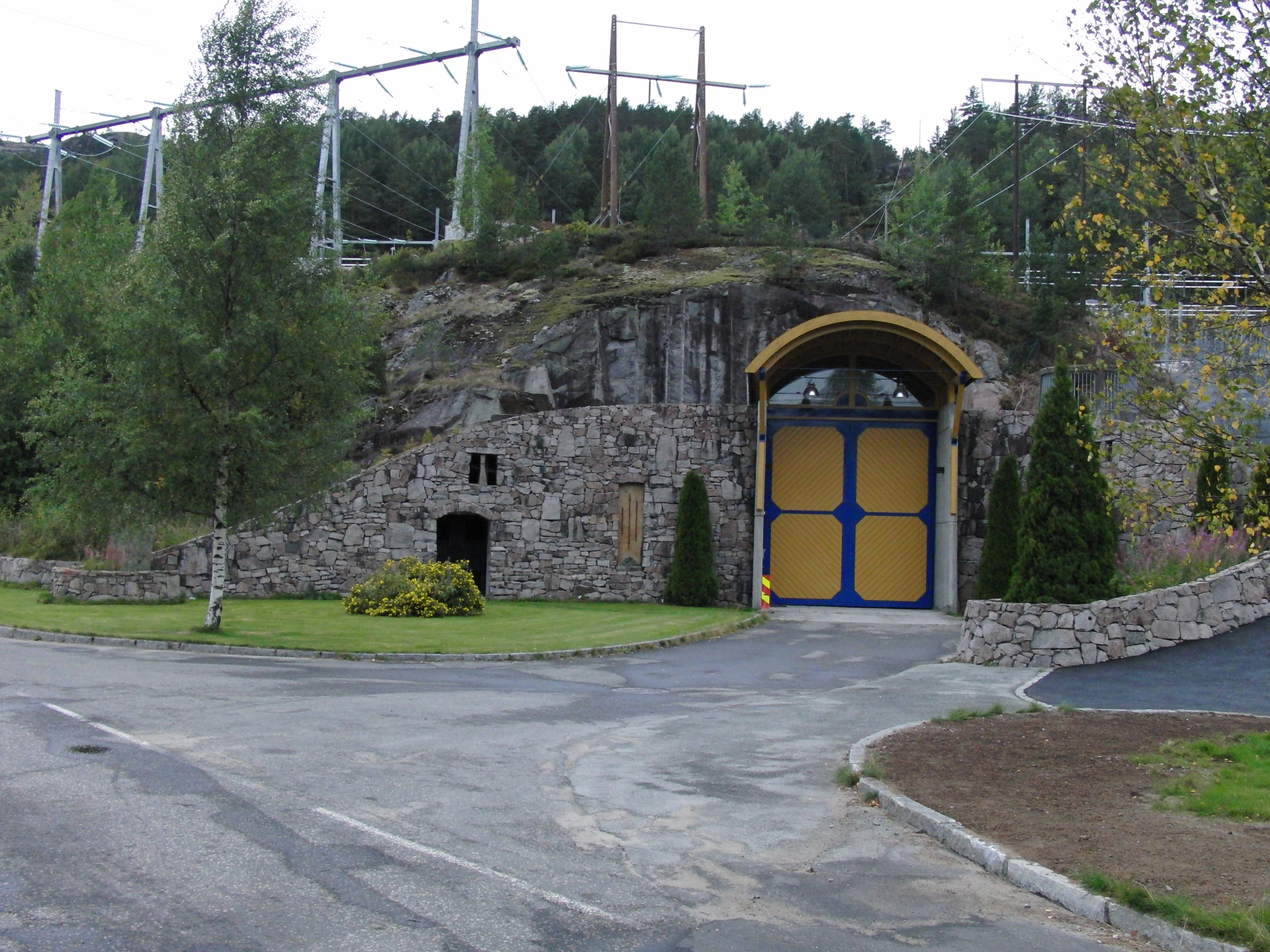
Skjerka power station, a source of power in Åseral

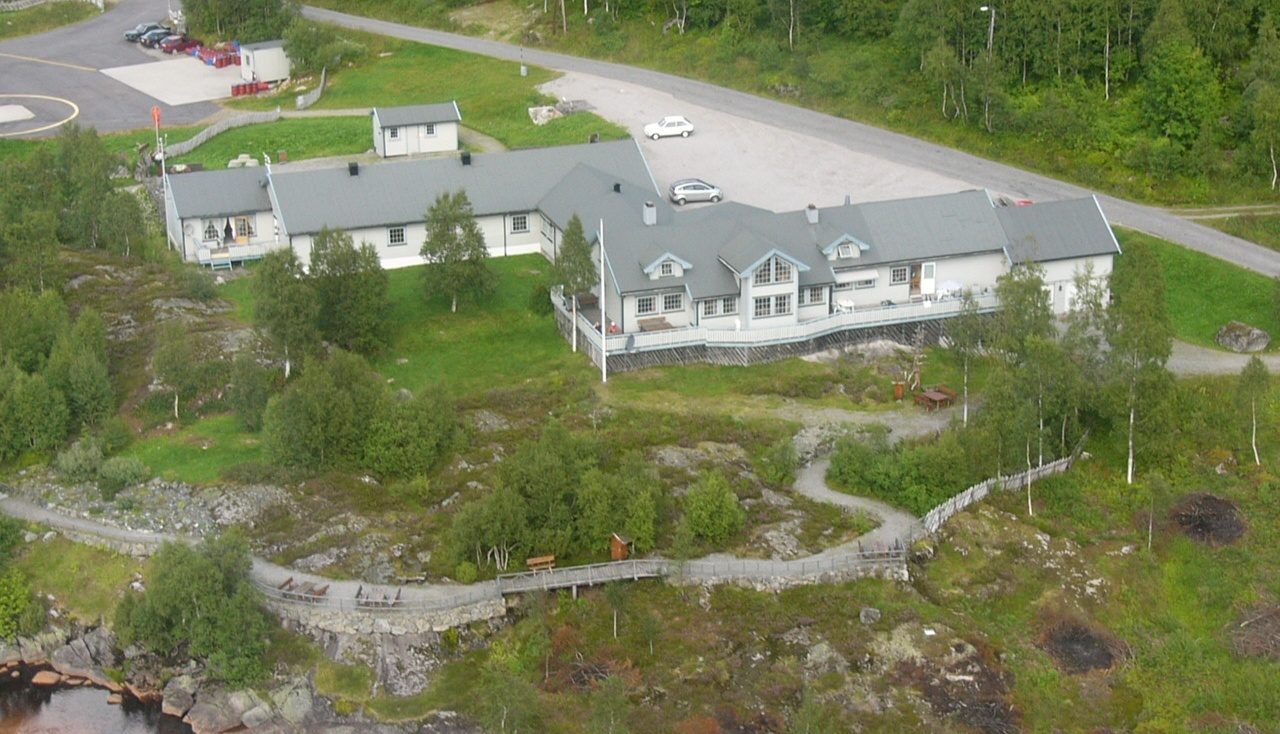
Ljosland fjellstove hotel in Åseral is part of the local tourism industry

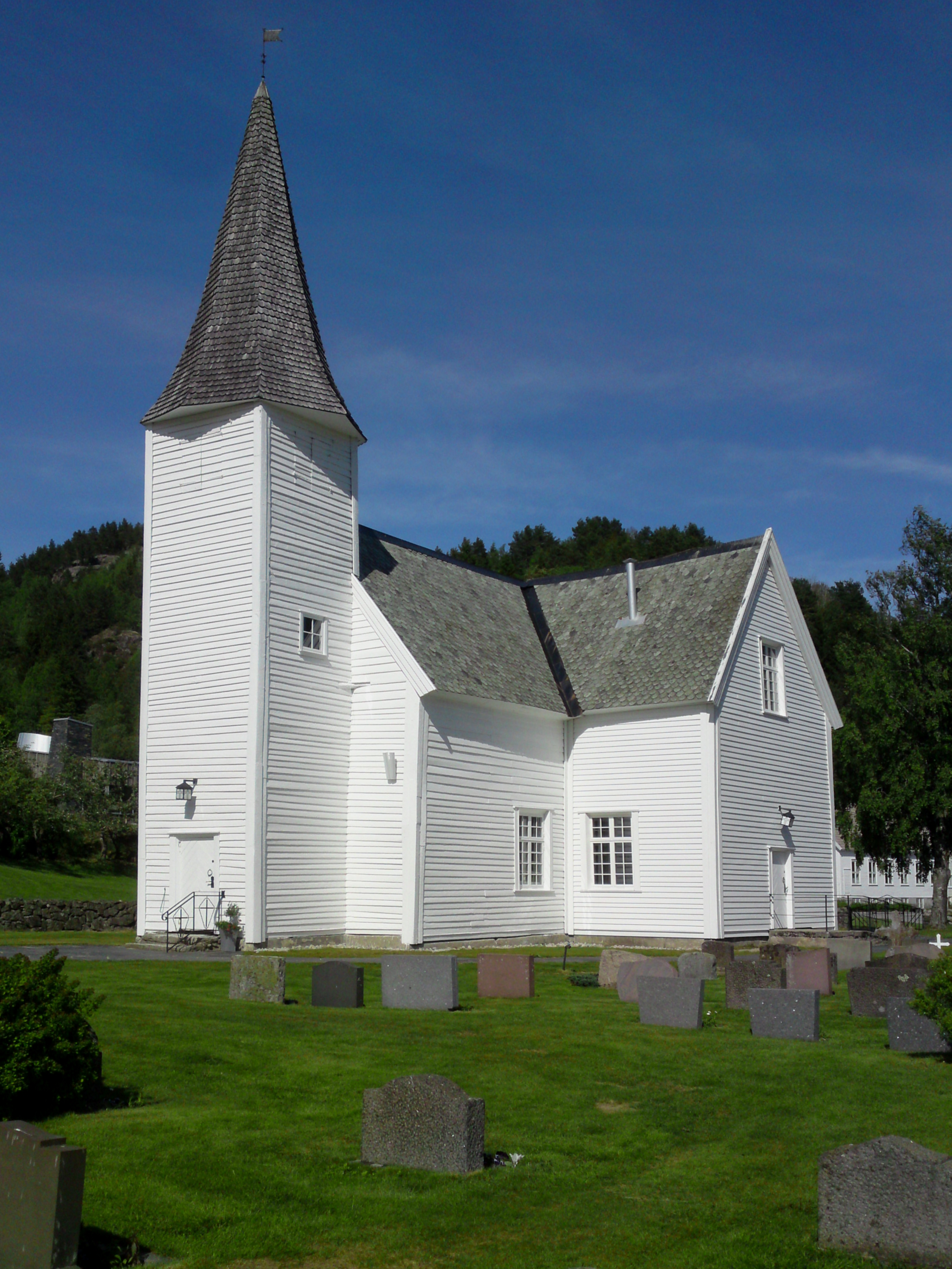
Åseral Church is the main church for the municipality.

=== Administrative history ===
For centuries, the large parish of Bjelland encompassed the northern half of the Mandalen valley which spanned parts of Lister og Mandal county in the south and Nedenes county in the north. The northern part of the parish was called Aaserald (in Nedenes) while the main part of the parish was in Lister og Mandal county. When the formannskapsdistrikt law went into effect on 1 January 1838, each parish was created as a municipality, however, since Bjelland covered areas in two counties, it had to be split into two municipalities. The northern part became the new Aaserald Municipality (later spelled Åseral) in Nedenes county and the rest became Bjelland og Grindum Municipality in Lister og Mandal county.

On 1 September 1880, Aaserald Municipality was transferred from Nedenes county to Lister og Mandal county (later called Vest-Agder county). From 1880 until 2020, this municipality was part of the old Vest-Agder county. In 2020, there were many municipal and county mergers across Norway due to the work of the Solberg cabinet. On 1 January 2020, the municipality became a part of the newly-formed Agder county (after Aust-Agder and Vest-Agder counties were merged).

Other than changing counties twice, the borders of the municipality have never changed (which is pretty rare among municipalities in Norway).

=== Name ===
The municipality (originally the parish) is named after the old name for the area (Old Norse: Ásaráll). The meaning of the name is somewhat uncertain. One theory is that the first element comes from the word áss which refers to "Æsir", the old pagan Norse gods and the last element is áll (Old Norse) or alhs (Gothic) which means "gods' temple". Another theory is that the first element the genitive case of the word áss which means "hill" or "mountain ridge" and the last element is áll which means "long strip" or "eel-shaped", which likely refers to the long, narrow lake Øre which is surrounded by mountains and hills.

Historically, the name was spelled Aaserald or Aaseral. On 21 December 1917, a royal resolution enacted the 1917 Norwegian language reforms. Prior to this change, the name was spelled Aaseral with the digraph "Aa", and after this reform, the name was spelled Åseral, using the letter Å instead.

=== Coat of arms ===
The coat of arms was granted on 20 January 1989. The official blazon is "Vert, a horseshoe argent" (Norwegian: På grøn grunn ein sølv hestesko). This means the arms have a green field (background) and the charge is a horseshoe. The horseshoe has a tincture of argent which means it is commonly colored white, but if it is made out of metal, then silver is used. The green color in the field symbolizes the importance of forestry and the horseshoe was chosen to represent the historical importance of horses in the farming culture of Åseral as well as the symbol of good luck. The arms were designed by Ulf Dreyer. The municipal flag has the same design as the coat of arms.

=== Churches ===
The Church of Norway has one parish (sokn) within Åseral Municipality. It is part of the Otredal prosti (deanery) in the Diocese of Agder og Telemark. Until 2019, it was part of the old Mandal prosti.

Churches in Åseral Municipality
Parish (sokn)	Church name	Location of the church	Year built
Åseral	Åseral Church	Kyrkjebygda	1822
Åseral	Ljosland Chapel	Ljosland	1959
Åseral	Åknes Chapel	Åknes	1873

== Government ==
Åseral Municipality is responsible for primary education (through 10th grade), outpatient health services, senior citizen services, welfare and other social services, zoning, economic development, and municipal roads and utilities. The municipality is governed by a municipal council of directly elected representatives. The mayor is indirectly elected by a vote of the municipal council. The municipality is under the jurisdiction of the Agder District Court and the Agder Court of Appeal.

=== Municipal council ===
The municipal council (Kommunestyre) of Åseral Municipality is made up of 17 representatives that are elected to four year terms. The tables below show the current and historical composition of the council by political party.

Åseral kommunestyre 2023–2027
Party name (in Nynorsk)	Number of representatives
Labour Party (Arbeidarpartiet)	6
Conservative Party (Høgre)	3
Christian Democratic Party (Kristeleg Folkeparti)	4
Centre Party (Senterpartiet)	4
Total number of members:	17

Åseral kommunestyre 2019–2023
Party name (in Nynorsk)	Number of representatives
Labour Party (Arbeidarpartiet)	6
Conservative Party (Høgre)	3
Christian Democratic Party (Kristeleg Folkeparti)	3
Centre Party (Senterpartiet)	5
Total number of members:	17

Åseral kommunestyre 2015–2019
Party name (in Nynorsk)	Number of representatives
Labour Party (Arbeidarpartiet)	3
Conservative Party (Høgre)	4
Christian Democratic Party (Kristeleg Folkeparti)	4
Centre Party (Senterpartiet)	6
Total number of members:	17

Åseral kommunestyre 2011–2015
Party name (in Nynorsk)	Number of representatives
Labour Party (Arbeidarpartiet)	4
Conservative Party (Høgre)	2
Centre Party (Senterpartiet)	8
Cross-party local list (Tverrpolitisk bygdeliste)	3
Total number of members:	17

Åseral kommunestyre 2007–2011
Party name (in Nynorsk)	Number of representatives
Labour Party (Arbeidarpartiet)	3
Conservative Party (Høgre)	2
Christian Democratic Party (Kristeleg Folkeparti)	4
Centre Party (Senterpartiet)	4
Cross-party local list (Tverrpolitisk bygdeliste)	4
Total number of members:	17

Åseral kommunestyre 2003–2007
Party name (in Nynorsk)	Number of representatives
Labour Party (Arbeidarpartiet)	3
Christian Democratic Party (Kristeleg Folkeparti)	4
Joint list of the Conservative Party (Høgre) and the Centre Party (Senterpartiet)	4
Cross-party local list (Tverrpolitisk bygdeliste)	6
Total number of members:	17

Åseral kommunestyre 1999–2003
Party name (in Nynorsk)	Number of representatives
Labour Party (Arbeidarpartiet)	2
Christian Democratic Party (Kristeleg Folkeparti)	4
Joint list of the Conservative Party (Høgre) and the Centre Party (Senterpartiet)	3
Cross-party local list (Tverrpolitisk bygdeliste)	8
Total number of members:	17

Åseral kommunestyre 1995–1999
Party name (in Nynorsk)	Number of representatives
Labour Party (Arbeidarpartiet)	2
Conservative Party (Høgre)	1
Christian Democratic Party (Kristeleg Folkeparti)	3
Centre Party (Senterpartiet)	2
Åseral local list (Åseral bygdeliste)	9
Total number of members:	17

Åseral kommunestyre 1991–1995
Party name (in Nynorsk)	Number of representatives
Labour Party (Arbeidarpartiet)	4
Conservative Party (Høgre)	2
Christian Democratic Party (Kristeleg Folkeparti)	3
Centre Party (Senterpartiet)	6
Åseral local list (Åseral bygdeliste)	2
Total number of members:	17

Åseral kommunestyre 1987–1991
Party name (in Nynorsk)	Number of representatives
Labour Party (Arbeidarpartiet)	3
Conservative Party (Høgre)	3
Christian Democratic Party (Kristeleg Folkeparti)	3
Centre Party (Senterpartiet)	5
Non-party local list (Upolitisk Bygdeliste)	3
Total number of members:	17

Åseral kommunestyre 1983–1987
Party name (in Nynorsk)	Number of representatives
Labour Party (Arbeidarpartiet)	3
Conservative Party (Høgre)	3
Christian Democratic Party (Kristeleg Folkeparti)	4
Centre Party (Senterpartiet)	7
Total number of members:	17

Åseral kommunestyre 1979–1983
Party name (in Nynorsk)	Number of representatives
Labour Party (Arbeidarpartiet)	3
Conservative Party (Høgre)	3
Christian Democratic Party (Kristeleg Folkeparti)	4
Centre Party (Senterpartiet)	7
Total number of members:	17

Åseral kommunestyre 1975–1979
Party name (in Nynorsk)	Number of representatives
Labour Party (Arbeidarpartiet)	2
Conservative Party (Høgre)	2
Christian Democratic Party (Kristeleg Folkeparti)	3
Centre Party (Senterpartiet)	10
Total number of members:	17

Åseral kommunestyre 1971–1975
Party name (in Nynorsk)	Number of representatives
Labour Party (Arbeidarpartiet)	3
Christian Democratic Party (Kristeleg Folkeparti)	2
Centre Party (Senterpartiet)	5
Liberal Party (Venstre)	3
Local List(s) (Lokale lister)	4
Total number of members:	17

Åseral kommunestyre 1967–1971
Party name (in Nynorsk)	Number of representatives
Labour Party (Arbeidarpartiet)	3
Christian Democratic Party (Kristeleg Folkeparti)	3
Centre Party (Senterpartiet)	5
Liberal Party (Venstre)	3
Local List(s) (Lokale lister)	3
Total number of members:	17

Åseral kommunestyre 1963–1967
Party name (in Nynorsk)	Number of representatives
Labour Party (Arbeidarpartiet)	3
Christian Democratic Party (Kristeleg Folkeparti)	2
Centre Party (Senterpartiet)	6
Liberal Party (Venstre)	4
Total number of members:	17

Åseral heradsstyre 1959–1963
Party name (in Nynorsk)	Number of representatives
Labour Party (Arbeidarpartiet)	3
Christian Democratic Party (Kristeleg Folkeparti)	3
Centre Party (Senterpartiet)	7
Liberal Party (Venstre)	4
Total number of members:	17

Åseral heradsstyre 1955–1959
Party name (in Nynorsk)	Number of representatives
Labour Party (Arbeidarpartiet)	3
Christian Democratic Party (Kristeleg Folkeparti)	3
Farmers' Party (Bondepartiet)	7
Liberal Party (Venstre)	4
Total number of members:	17

Åseral heradsstyre 1951–1955
Party name (in Nynorsk)	Number of representatives
Labour Party (Arbeidarpartiet)	2
Christian Democratic Party (Kristeleg Folkeparti)	3
Farmers' Party (Bondepartiet)	6
Liberal Party (Venstre)	4
Local List(s) (Lokale lister)	1
Total number of members:	16

Åseral heradsstyre 1947–1951
Party name (in Nynorsk)	Number of representatives
Labour Party (Arbeidarpartiet)	2
Christian Democratic Party (Kristeleg Folkeparti)	3
Farmers' Party (Bondepartiet)	5
Joint List(s) of Non-Socialist Parties (Borgarlege Felleslister)	5
Local List(s) (Lokale lister)	1
Total number of members:	16

Åseral heradsstyre 1945–1947
Party name (in Nynorsk)	Number of representatives
Labour Party (Arbeidarpartiet)	3
Farmers' Party (Bondepartiet)	6
Local List(s) (Lokale lister)	7
Total number of members:	16

Åseral heradsstyre 1937–1941*
Party name (in Nynorsk)	Number of representatives
Labour Party (Arbeidarpartiet)	1
Farmers' Party (Bondepartiet)	10
Liberal Party (Venstre)	5
Total number of members:	16
Note: Due to the German occupation of Norway during World War II, no elections were held for new municipal councils until after the war ended in 1945.

=== Mayors ===
The mayor (Nynorsk: ordførar) of Åseral Municipality is the political leader of the municipality and the chairperson of the municipal council. The following people have held this position:

- 1838–1845: Ola O. Aasland
- 1845–1847: Knut Sigmundsen Breland
- 1847–1849: Lars Sørensen Østerhus
- 1849–1851: Haarek Sigmundsen Breland
- 1851–1855: Erik Johnsen Aamland
- 1855–1857: Tarjei Olsen Tveitstøl
- 1857–1863: Rev. Gabriel Fredrik Ludvig Shübeler
- 1863–1865: Erik Johnsen Aamland
- 1865–1867: Bernt E. Eikerapen
- 1867–1869: Ola O. Forgard
- 1869–1876: Ole O. Ljosland
- 1876–1877: Gunnuf O. Kylland
- 1877–1877: Jakob Berg
- 1877–1884: Maarten O. Kittelstad
- 1884–1892: Ola O. Thorsland
- 1892–1898: Morten Kittelstad
- 1898–1898: John Telhaug
- 1899–1911: Petter Ljosland
- 1911–1929: Knut Egså
- 1929–1935: Salve Taraldsen Østerhus
- 1935–1941: Olav J. Åsland
- 1941–1942: Salve Taraldsen Østerhus
- 1943–1945: Torgeir Forgard
- 1946–1952: Olav J. Åsland
- 1952–1957: Olav Byklüm
- 1958–1963: Olav Øyulvstad
- 1964–1971: Tom Kaddeberg
- 1971–1975: Ånund Berg (LL)
- 1975–1977: Sigmund Jortveit (Sp)
- 1977–1979: Jens M. Forgard (Sp)
- 1979–1991: Kristen Kylland (Sp)
- 1991–2007: Jørgen Åsland (Sp)
- 2007–2019: Oddmund Ljosland (Sp)
- 2019–present: Inger Lise Lund Stulien (Ap)

== Geography ==
Åseral Municipality is in the central, inland part of Southern Norway. It is in the Setesdalsheiene mountains and adjacent to the Setesdal valley to the northeast. The municipality has many lakes, some of which are dammed for purposes of hydroelectric power. Some of the lakes include Nåvatn, Juvatn, Øre, and Gyvatn. The river Mandalselva and the Mandalen valley both begin in Åseral. The highest point in the municipality is the 1,041.27-metre (3,416.2 ft) tall mountain Skoræ, located west of the village of Ljosland.

Åseral Municipality borders Bygland Municipality to the north and east, Evje og Hornnes Municipality to the east, Lyngdal Municipality to the south, Hægebostad Municipality to the southwest, and Kvinesdal Municipality in the west.

=== Climate ===
Climate data for Åseral 1991-2020 (268 m)
Month	Jan	Feb	Mar	Apr	May	Jun	Jul	Aug	Sep	Oct	Nov	Dec	Year
Daily mean °C (°F)	−1.4 (29.5)	−1.9 (28.6)	0.4 (32.7)	4.6 (40.3)	9.5 (49.1)	13.1 (55.6)	15.4 (59.7)	14 (57)	10.7 (51.3)	5.9 (42.6)	2.1 (35.8)	−1.1 (30.0)	5.9 (42.7)
Average precipitation mm (inches)	215 (8.5)	140 (5.5)	121 (4.8)	86 (3.4)	100 (3.9)	99 (3.9)	115 (4.5)	154 (6.1)	172 (6.8)	215 (8.5)	222 (8.7)	213 (8.4)	1,852 (73)
Average precipitation days (≥ 1 mm)	15.7	10.7	12.6	9.4	11.4	10.6	11.0	12.4	14.2	15.7	16.4	15.2	155.3
Source: Norwegian Meteorological Institute

== Attractions ==
Åseral Municipality is a popular winter tourist destination with three ski resorts in the villages of Bortelid, Ljosland, and Eikerapen. Eikerapen is also the site of the annual Eikerapen Roots Festival, an international music festival attracting thousands of people from all over Europe.

== Notable people ==
- Lars Knutson Liestøl (1839–1912), a politician who was Mayor of Bygland Municipality for 12 years
- Knut Liestøl (1881 in Åseral – 1952), a folklorist, Nynorsk proponent, and politician
