= Kyrkjebygda =

Village in Åseral Municipality, Norway

Kyrkjebygda Kyrkjebygdi
- Village
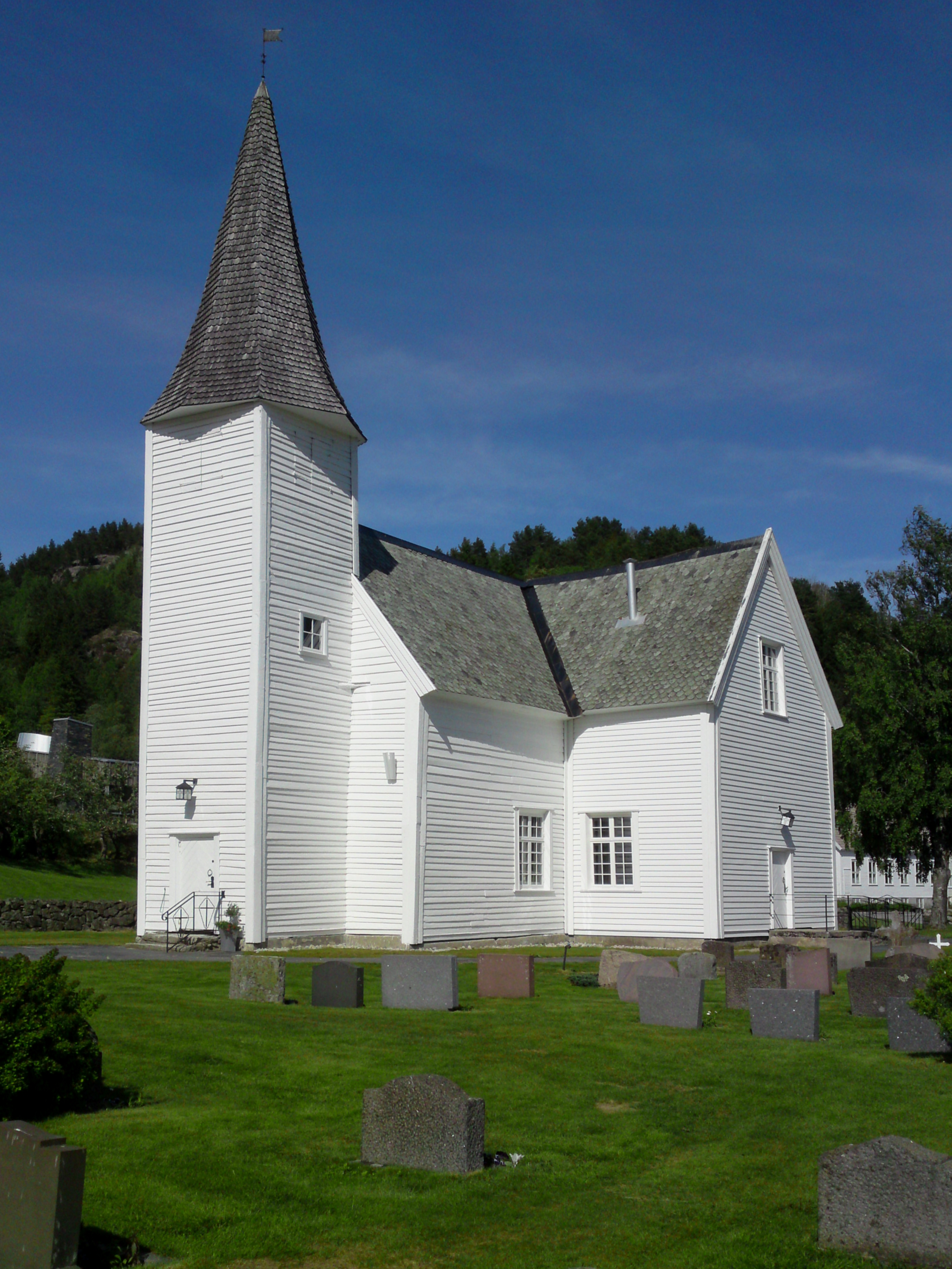
- View of the village church
- Interactive map of Kyrkjebygda
- Coordinates: 58.61527°N 7.42093°E
- Country: Norway
- Region: Southern Norway
- County: Agder
- District: Lindesnes
- Municipality: Åseral Municipality
- Elevation: 268 m (879 ft)
- Time zone: UTC+01:00 (CET)
  - Summer (DST): UTC+02:00 (CEST)
- Post Code: 4540 Åseral

Kyrkjebygda is the administrative centre of Åseral Municipality in Agder county, Norway. The village is located on a small flat plain in a valley at the northern end of the lake Øre at the confluence of the rivers Logna and Monn. The Monn river valley heads north-northwest to the village of Ljosland and the Logna river valley heads north-northeast to the villages of Åknes and Bortelid.

The name Kyrkjebygda literally means "church village" in the Norwegian language. It has this name since it has been the site of Åseral Church for centuries.
