= Logna =

- Frazione
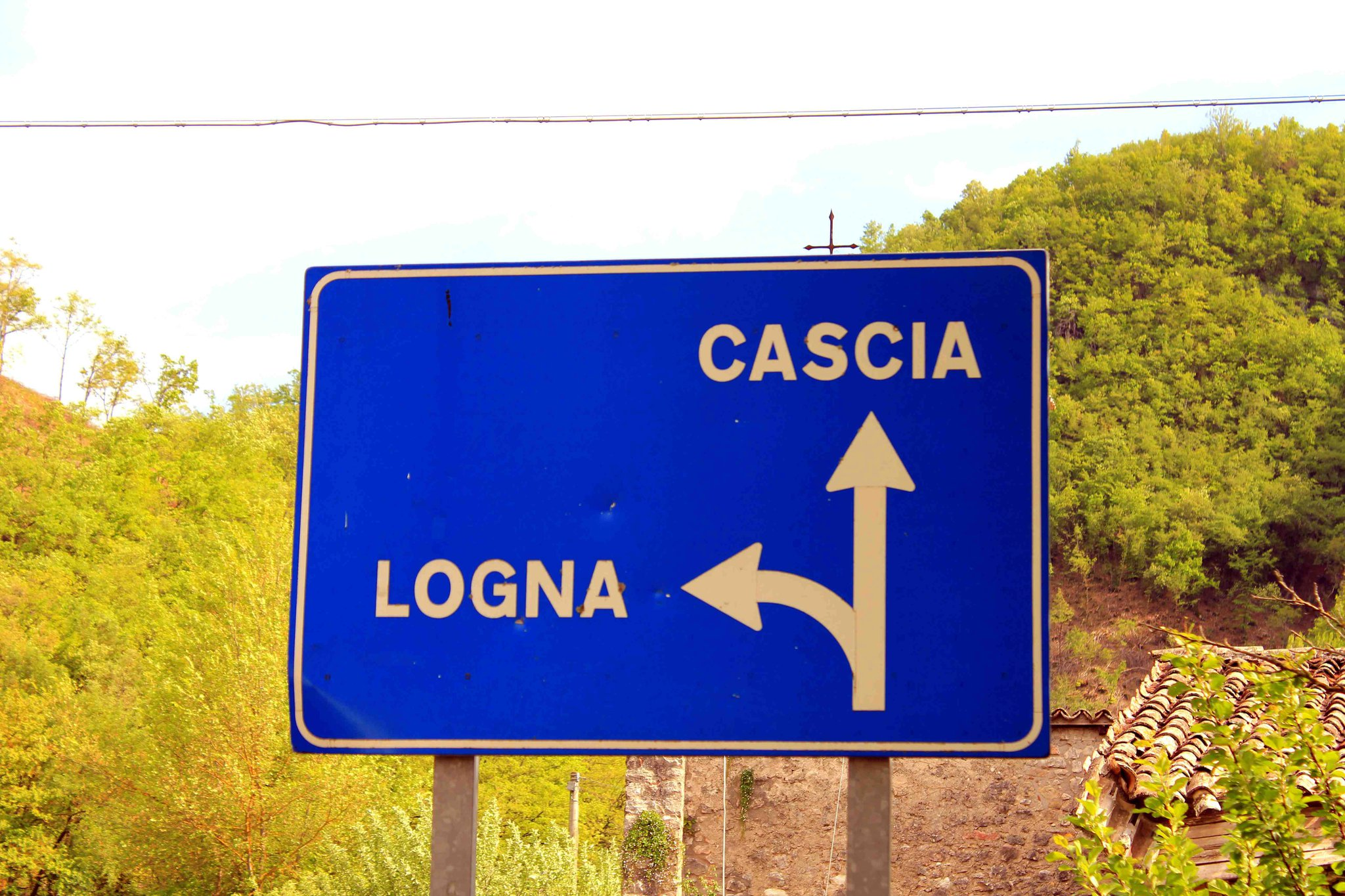

- Location within Italy
- Coordinates: 42°44′46″N 13°00′48″E
- Country: Italy
- Region: Umbria
- Province: Perugia
- Comune: Cascia
- Elevation: 818 m (2,684 ft)

Population (2001)
  - Total: 65
- Time zone: UTC+1 (CET)
  - Summer (DST): UTC+2 (CEST)
- Postcode: 06043
- Area code: 0743

Logna is a frazione of the comune of Cascia in the Province of Perugia, Umbria, central Italy. It stands at an elevation of 818 metres (2,684 ft) above sea level. At the time of the Istat census of 2001 it had 65 inhabitants.
