= Mandalen =

Valley in Agder, Norway

- Length: 75 kilometres (47 mi) North-South

Geology
- Type: River valley

Geography
- Location: Agder, Norway
- Population centers: Mandal
- Coordinates: 58.22038°N 7.52019°E
- River: Mandalselva

Location
- Interactive map of Mandalen

Mandalen is a river valley in Agder county, Norway. The 75-kilometre (47 mi) long valley runs from the lake Øre in Åseral Municipality south through Lindesnes Municipality and it ends at the sea at the town of Mandal in the south. The river Mandalselva runs through the valley. The side valleys are Ljoslandsdalen and Lognadalen.
