= Lindesnes Region =

Region in Agder county, Norway

Lindesnes Region Lindesnesregionen
- Metropolitan Region (Metro)
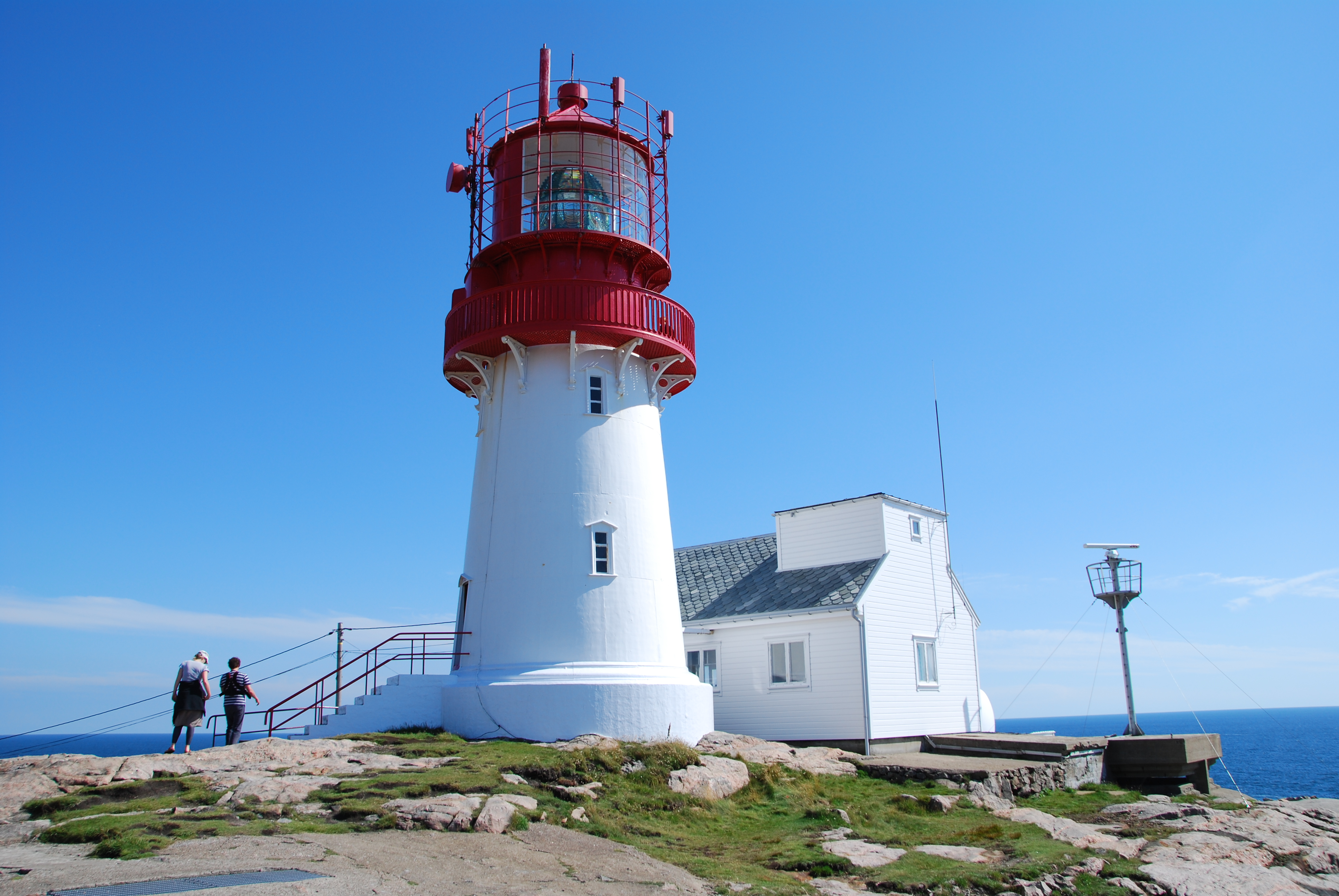
- Lindesnes Lighthouse, the southernmost point of Norway

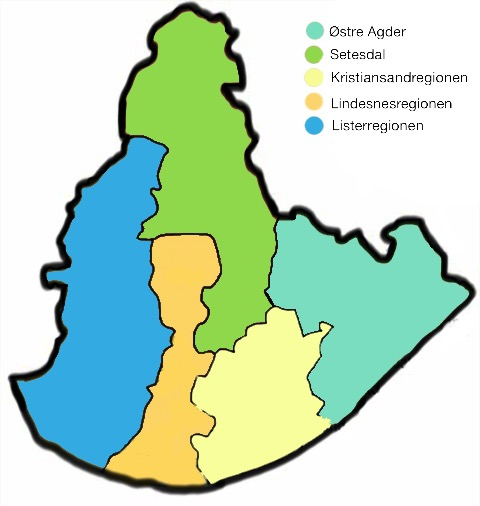
- Lindesnes Region in orange, in the map of Agder.
- Coordinates: 58.6°N 7.8°E
- Country: Norway
- County (fylke): Agder
- Urban centre: Mandal

Area
  - Total: 1,821 km^{2} (703 sq mi)

Population (2026)
  - Total: 24,606
  - Density: 13.51/km^{2} (35.00/sq mi)

The Lindesnes Region (or Mandal Region) is the metropolitan region surrounding the town of Mandal in Southern Norway. The region has no governmental functions, but it encompasses Lindesnes Municipality and Åseral Municipality in Agder county, primarily covering two large river valleys: Mandalen and Audnedalen. Because of this, the area of the old Audnedal Municipality (now part of Lyngdal Municipality) is also sometimes included in this area. The region is Norway's southernmost region and it borders the Kristiansand Region to the east and the Lister Region to the west.

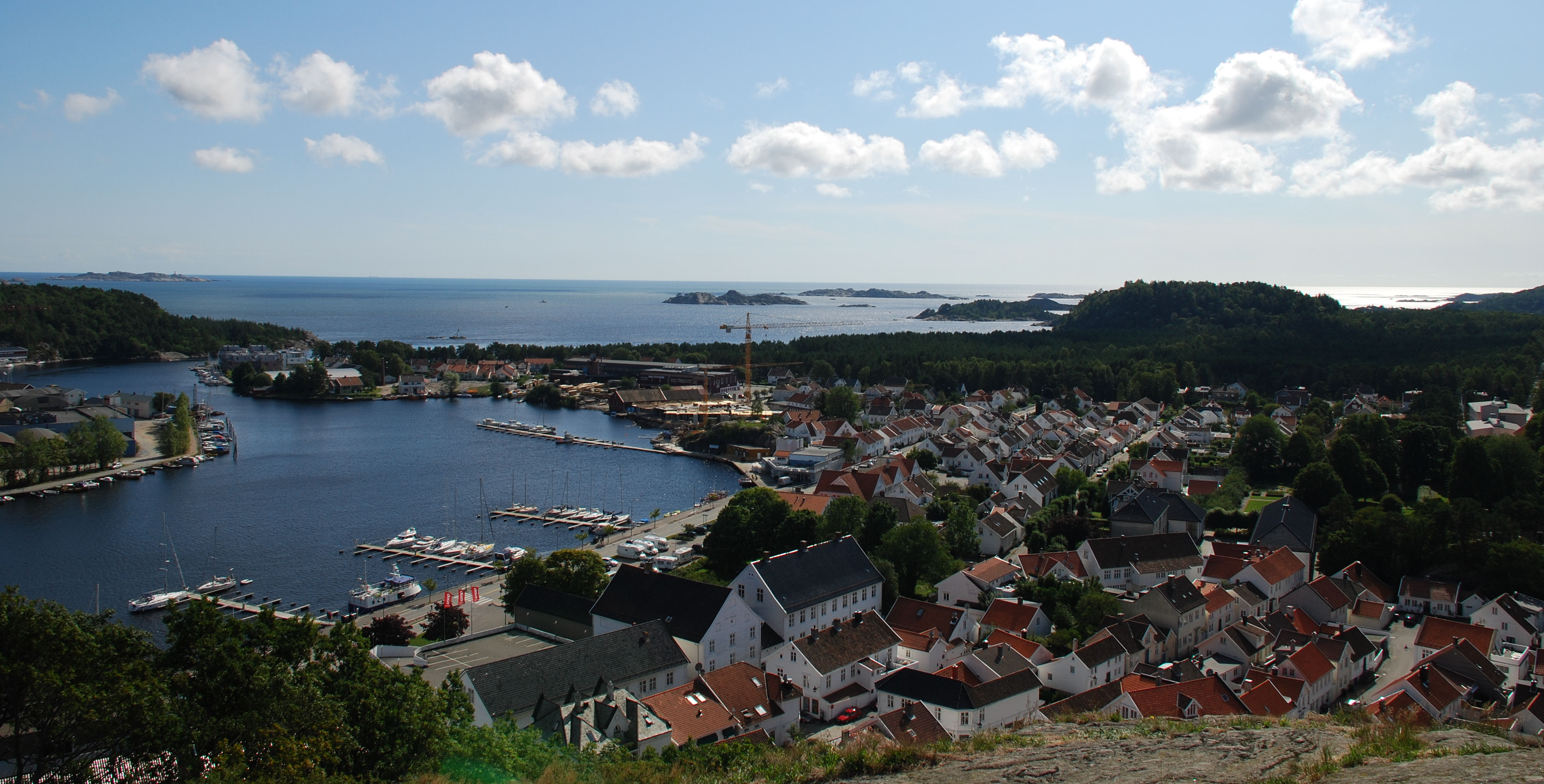
Mandal, the largest city of the Lindesnes Region

== Municipalities ==
The Lindesnes Region includes the following municipalities:

| Map | Name | Coat of arms | Adm. center | Population (2026) | Area (km²) | Language | Location |
|---|---|---|---|---|---|---|---|
| Lindesnes Municipality | | | Mandal | 23,702 | 933.56 | Bokmål | Coast |
| Åseral Municipality | | | Kyrkjebygda | 904 | 887.51 | Nynorsk | Inland |
