= List of churches in Agder og Telemark =

Map of the deaneries within the Diocese of Agder og Telemark

Several Church of Norway churches are in the Diocese of Agder og Telemark in Norway. This list includes all of the parishes in Agder and Telemark counties. The diocese is based at the Kristiansand Cathedral in the city of Kristiansand in Kristiansand Municipality.

The list is divided into several sections, one for each deanery (prosti; headed by a provost) in the diocese. Administratively within each deanery, the churches within each municipality elects their own church council (fellesråd). Each municipality may have one or more parishes (sokn) within the municipality. Each parish elects their own councils (soknerådet). Each parish has one or more local church. The number and size of the deaneries and parishes has changed over time.

== Kristiansand domprosti ==
This arch-deanery (Norwegian: domprosti) covers all the churches within the municipality of Kristiansand in southern Agder county. The arch-deanery is headquartered at the Kristiansand Cathedral in the city of Kristiansand in Kristiansand Municipality.

The Kristiansand domprosti has existed for a long time. On 4 May 1819, most of the rural areas in the arch-deanery were separated to form the new Mandal prosti, leaving a much smaller arch-deanery centred around the city of Kristiansand. On 1 January 2020, the parishes in the old Songdalen Municipality and Søgne Municipality were merged into the Kristiansand domprosti when Kristiansand Municipality was enlarged.

Municipality	Parish (sokn)	Church	Location	Year built	Photo
Kristiansand	Kristiansand domkirke	Kristiansand Cathedral	Kristiansand	1884	
Kristiansand	Finsland	Finsland Church	Finsland	1803	
Kristiansand	Flekkerøy	Flekkerøy Church	Flekkerøy	1960	
Kristiansand	Greipstad	Greipstad Church	Nodeland	1829	
Kristiansand	Grim	Grim Church	Grim	1969	
Kristiansand	Hellemyr	Hellemyr Church	Hellemyr	1988	
Kristiansand	Hånes	Hånes Church	Hånes	1986	
Kristiansand	Lund	Lund Church	Lund	1987	
Kristiansand	Oddernes	Justvik Church	Justvik	1985	
Kristiansand	Oddernes	Oddernes Church	Oddernes	c. 1040	
Kristiansand	Randesund	Randesund Church	Randesund	1864	
Kristiansand	Randesund	Søm Church	Søm	2004	
Kristiansand	Søgne	Søgne Church	Lunde	1861	
Kristiansand	Søgne	Old Søgne Church	Søgne	1604	
Kristiansand	Torridal	Torridal Church	Aukland	1978	
Kristiansand	Tveit	Tveit Church	Tveit	c. 1100	
Kristiansand	Voie	Voie Church	Voie	1990	
Kristiansand	Vågsbygd	Vågsbygd Church	Vågsbygd	1967	

== Arendal prosti ==
This deanery (Norwegian: prosti) covers a small, coastal, urban area covering Arendal Municipality and Froland Municipality in Agder county. The deanery is headquartered at Trinity Church in the town of Arendal in Arendal Municipality.

The deanery was established on 1 January 1872 when it was split off from the Vest-Nedenes prosti. It initially included all the parishes of Trefoldighet, Barbu, Austre Moland, Tromøy, Hisøy, Øyestad, Froland, and Herefoss. The parishes of Austre Moland, Flosta, and Stokken were merged to form the parish of Moland effective 1 January 2018.

Municipality	Parish (sokn)	Church	Location	Year built	Photo
Arendal	Barbu	Barbu Church	Barbu	1880	
Arendal	Hisøy	Hisøy Church	His	1849	
Arendal	Moland	Austre Moland Church	Brekka	1673	
Arendal	Moland	Flosta Church	Flosta	1632	
Arendal	Moland	Stokken Church	Saltrød	1878	
Arendal	Trefoldighet	Trinity Church	Arendal	1888	
Arendal	Tromøy	Færvik Church	Færvik	1884	
Arendal	Tromøy	Tromøy Church	Brekka	c. 1150	
Arendal	Øyestad	Bjorbekk Church	Bjorbekk	1884	
Arendal	Øyestad	Engene Church	Nedenes	1849	
Arendal	Øyestad	Øyestad Church	Rykene	c. 1200	
Froland	Froland	Froland Church	Froland	1718	
Froland	Froland	Mykland Church	Mykland	1832	

== Aust-Nedenes prosti ==
This deanery (Norwegian: prosti) covers the eastern part of Agder county including the municipalities of Gjerstad, Tvedestrand, Risør Municipality, Åmli, and Vegårshei. The deanery is headquartered at Tvedestrand Church in the town of Tvedestrand in Tvedestrand Municipality.

The deanery was established on 1 March 1826 when the old Nedenes prosti was divided into Vestre Nedenæs prosti in the west and Østre Nedenæs prosti in the east. A royal resolution on 19 May 1922 changed the deanery name from "Østre Nedenæs prosti" to "Aust-Nedenes prosti".

Municipality	Parish (sokn)	Church	Location	Year built	Photo
Gjerstad	Gjerstad	Gjerstad Church	Gjerstad	1848	
Risør	Risør	Frydendal Church	Risør	1879	
Risør	Risør	Risør Church	Risør	1647	
Risør	Søndeled	Søndeled Church	Søndeled	c. 1150	
Tvedestrand	Dypvåg	Dypvåg Church	Dypvåg	c. 1200	
Tvedestrand	Holt	Holt Church	Fiane	c. 1100	
Tvedestrand	Holt	Laget Church	Laget	1908	
Tvedestrand	Tvedestrand	Tvedestrand Church	Tvedestrand	1861	
Vegårshei	Vegårshei	Vegårshei Church	Myra	1810	
Åmli	Åmli	Gjøvdal Church	Askland	1803	
Åmli	Åmli	Tovdal Church	Hillestad	1820	
Åmli	Åmli	Åmli Church	Åmli	1909	

== Bamble prosti ==
This deanery (Norwegian: prosti) covers the southeastern part of Telemark county including Bamble Municipality, Drangedal Municipality, and Kragerø Municipality. The deanery is headquartered at Kragerø Church in the town of Kragerø in Kragerø Municipality.

The deanery was created in 1843 when the old Nedre Telemark og Bamble prosti was divided into Nedre Telemark prosti and Bamble prosti. Bamble prosti originally included the parishes of Bamble, Gjerpen, Siljan, Langesund, Drangedal, Eidanger, Brevik, Kragerø, and Porsgrunn. In 1868, the parishes of Siljan, Gjerpen, Porsgrunn, Eidanger, and Brevik were transferred to the newly created Skien prosti.

Municipality	Parish (sokn)	Church	Location	Year built	Photo
Bamble	Bamble	Bamble Church	Bamble	1845	
Bamble	Bamble	Herre Church	Herre	1905	
Bamble	Langesund	Langesund Church	Langesund	1992	
Bamble	Stathelle	Stathelle Church	Stathelle	1964	
Drangedal	Drangedal	Drangedal Church	Prestestranda	1775	
Drangedal	Kroken	Kroken Church	Kroken	1909	
Drangedal	Tørdal	Tørdal Church	Bø	1809	
Kragerø	Helle	Helle Church	Helle	1981	
Kragerø	Kragerø	Kragerø Church	Kragerø	1870	
Kragerø	Levangsheia	Støle Church	Støle	1892	
Kragerø	Sannidal	Sannidal Church	Kil	1772	
Kragerø	Skåtøy	Skåtøy Church	Skåtøy	1862	

== Lister og Mandal prosti ==
This deanery (Norwegian: prosti) covers the western part of Agder county, including the municipalities of Farsund, Flekkefjord, Hægebostad, Kvinesdal, Lindesnes, Lyngdal, and Sirdal. The deanery is headquartered at Lyngdal Church in the town of Lyngdal in Lyngdal Municipality.

The deanery was created on 1 January 2020 when the old Lister prosti and Mandal prosti were merged. The old Lister prosti was headquartered at Flekkefjord Church in the town of Flekkefjord in Flekkefjord Municipality and the deanery included the municipalities of Farsund, Flekkefjord, Hægebostad, Kvinesdal, Lyngdal, and Sirdal. The old Mandal prosti included the municipalities of Audnedal, Lindesnes, Mandal, Marnardal, Songdalen, Søgne, and Åseral (until 2019). The deanery was headquartered at Mandal Church in the town of Mandal in Mandal Municipality.

Municipality	Parish (sokn)	Church	Location	Year built	Photo
Farsund	Farsund	Frelseren Church	Farsund	1905	
Farsund	Farsund	Herad Church	Sande	1957	
Farsund	Farsund	Spind Church	Rødland	1776	
Farsund	Lista	Vanse Church	Vanse	1037	
Farsund	Lista	Vestbygda Chapel	Vestbygd	1909	
Flekkefjord	Bakke	Bakke Church	Sira	1670	
Flekkefjord	Flekkefjord	Flekkefjord Church	Flekkefjord	1833	
Flekkefjord	Gyland	Gyland Church	Gyland	1929	
Flekkefjord	Hidra	Hidra Church	Kirkehamn	1854	
Hægebostad	Eiken	Eiken Church	Eiken	1817	
Hægebostad	Hægebostad	Hægebostad Church	Snartemo	1844	
Kvinesdal	Feda	Feda Church	Feda	1802	
Kvinesdal	Fjotland	Fjotland Church	Fjotland	1836	
Kvinesdal	Fjotland	Netlandsnes Chapel	Netland	1886	
Kvinesdal	Kvinesdal	Kvinesdal Church	Liknes	1837	
Lindesnes	Holum	Holum Church	Krossen	1825	
Lindesnes	Mandal	Harkmark Church	Harkmark	1613	
Lindesnes	Mandal	Mandal Church	Mandal	1821	
Lindesnes	Marnardal	Bjelland Church	Bjelland	1793	
Lindesnes	Marnardal	Laudal Church	Laudal	1826	
Lindesnes	Marnardal	Øyslebø Church	Øyslebø	1797	
Lindesnes	Lindesnes	Spangereid Church	Høllen	1140	
Lindesnes	Lindesnes	Valle Church	Vigeland	1793	
Lindesnes	Lindesnes	Vigmostad Church	Vigmostad	1848	
Lyngdal	Grindheim	Grindheim Church	Byremo	1783	
Lyngdal	Konsmo	Konsmo Church	Konsmo	1802	
Lyngdal	Lyngdal	Austad Church	Austad	1803	
Lyngdal	Lyngdal	Korshamn Chapel	Korshamn	1906	
Lyngdal	Lyngdal	Kvås Church	Kvås	1836	
Lyngdal	Lyngdal	Lyngdal Church	Lyngdal	1848	
Sirdal	Sirdal	Haughom Chapel	Haughom	1930	
Sirdal	Sirdal	Kvævemoen Chapel	Kvæven	1962	
Sirdal	Sirdal	Lunde Church	Lunde	1873	
Sirdal	Sirdal	Tonstad Church	Tonstad	1852	

== Otredal prosti ==
This deanery (Norwegian: prosti) covers the Otra river valley through Agder county, this includes the Setesdal and upper Torridal valleys. It includes the municipalities of Bygland, Evje og Hornnes, Bykle, Iveland, Valle, Vennesla, and Åseral. The deanery is headquartered at Vennesla Church in the village of Vennesla in Vennesla Municipality in Agder county.

Otredal prosti, originally called Torridal prosti, was created 10 May 1862 when it was carved out of the three neighboring deaneries of Råbyggelaget prosti, Mandal prosti, and Vestre Nedenes prosti. Initially, it included the municipalities of Oddernes, Øvrebø, Søgne, and Tveit. Over time, the borders of Torridal prosti were changed. In 1883, the Søgne parish was moved (back) to the Mandal prosti and the Tveit parish was moved (back) to the Vestre Nedenes prosti. Also in 1883, the parishes of Valle, Evje, and Bygland joined Torridal prosti when the old Råbyggelaget prosti was dissolved. In 1905, the Tveit parish was moved back (again) to Torridal prosti. On 12 June 1931 the name of the deanery was changed from Torridal prosti to Otredal prosti. On 1 January 2019, the parish of Åseral Municipality was moved from Mandal prosti to Otredal prosti.

Municipality	Parish (sokn)	Church	Location	Year built	Photo
Bygland	Bygland og Årdal	Austad Church	Tveit	1880	
Bygland	Bygland og Årdal	Bygland Church	Bygland	1838	
Bygland	Bygland og Årdal	Sandnes Church	Åraksbø	1844	
Bygland	Bygland og Årdal	Årdal Church	Grendi	1828	
Bykle	Bykle	Bykle Church	Bykle	2004	
Bykle	Bykle	Old Bykle Church	Bykle	1619	
Bykle	Bykle	Fjellgardane Church	Hovden	1955	
Evje og Hornnes	Evje og Hornnes	Evje Church	Evje	1891	
Evje og Hornnes	Evje og Hornnes	Hornnes Church	Hornnes	1828	
Iveland	Iveland	Iveland Church	Birketveit	1837	
Valle	Valle og Hylestad	Hylestad Church	Rysstad	1838	
Valle	Valle og Hylestad	Valle Church	Valle	1844	
Vennesla	Hægeland	Hægeland Church	Hægeland	1830	
Vennesla	Vennesla	Vennesla Church	Vennesla	2021	
Vennesla	Vennesla	Old Vennesla Church	Vennesla	1830	
Vennesla	Øvrebø	Øvrebø Church	Øvrebø	1800	
Åseral	Åseral	Ljosland Chapel	Ljosland	1959	
Åseral	Åseral	Åknes Chapel	Åknes	1873	
Åseral	Åseral	Åseral Church	Kyrkjebygda	1822	

== Skien prosti ==
This deanery (Norwegian: prosti) covers the urban, southeastern part of Telemark county including Siljan Municipality, Skien Municipality, and Porsgrunn Municipality. The deanery is headquartered at Skien Church in the town of Skien in Skien Municipality.

The deanery was established in 1868 when the parishes of Gjerpen, Siljan, Porsgrunn, Eidanger, and Brevik from Bamble prosti and the parish of Skien from Nedre Telemark prosti were merged.

Municipality	Parish (sokn)	Church	Location	Year built	Photo
Siljan	Siljan	Siljan Church	Siljan	c. 1200	
Skien	Borgestad	Borgestad Church	Borgestad	1907	
Skien	Gimsøy og Nenset	Gimsøy Church	Gimsøy	1922	
Skien	Gimsøy og Nenset	Nenset Church	Tollnes	1961	
Skien	Gjerpen	Gjerpen Church	Skien	1153	
Skien	Gjerpen	Luksefjell Church	Luksefjell	1858	
Skien	Gjerpen	Valebø Church	Valebø	1903	
Skien	Gulset og Skotfoss	Gulset Church	Gulset	1986	
Skien	Gulset og Skotfoss	Skotfoss Church	Skotfoss	1900	
Skien	Kilebygda og Solum	Kilebygda Church	Rognsbru	1859	
Skien	Kilebygda og Solum	Solum Church	Solum	1766	
Skien	Melum	Melum Church	Mælum	1728	
Skien	Skien	Skien Church	Skien	1894	
Porsgrunn	Eidanger	Brevik Church	Brevik	1963	
Porsgrunn	Eidanger	Eidanger Church	Eidanger	c. 1150	
Porsgrunn	Eidanger	Herøya Church	Porsgrunn	1957	
Porsgrunn	Eidanger	Langangen Church	Langangen	1891	
Porsgrunn	Eidanger	Stridsklev Church	Porsgrunn	2000	
Porsgrunn	Porsgrunn	Vestre Porsgrunn Church	Porsgrunn	1758	
Porsgrunn	Porsgrunn	Østre Porsgrunn Church	Porsgrunn	2019	

== Vest-Nedenes prosti ==
This deanery (Norwegian: prosti) covers the southeastern part of Agder county including Birkenes, Grimstad, and Lillesand along the southeastern coast of Agder county. The deanery is headquartered at Lillesand Church in the town of Lillesand in Lillesand Municipality.

The deanery was established on 1 March 1826 when the old Nedenes prosti was divided into Vestre Nedenæs prosti in the west and Østre Nedenæs prosti in the east. A royal resolution on 19 May 1922 changed the deanery name from "Vestre Nedenæs prosti" to "Vest-Nedenes prosti".

Municipality	Parish (sokn)	Church	Location	Year built	Photo
Birkenes	Birkenes	Birkenes Church	Mollestad	1858	
Birkenes	Herefoss	Herefoss Church	Herefoss	1865	
Birkenes	Vegusdal	Vegusdal Church	Engesland	1867	
Grimstad	Eide	Eide Church	Eide	1795	
Grimstad	Fjære	Fevik Church	Fevik	1976	
Grimstad	Fjære	Fjære Church	Fjære	c. 1150	
Grimstad	Grimstad	Grimstad Church	Grimstad	1881	
Grimstad	Landvik	Landvik Church	Roresand	1825	
Grimstad	Landvik	Østerhus Church	Østerhus	1980	
Lillesand	Høvåg	Høvåg Church	Høvåg	c. 1100	
Lillesand	Lillesand	Lillesand Church	Lillesand	1889	
Lillesand	Lillesand	Justøy Chapel	Brekkestø	1884	
Lillesand	Lillesand	Vestre Moland Church	Møglestu	c. 1150	

== Øvre Telemark prosti ==
This deanery (Norwegian: prosti) covers the western part of Telemark county including the municipalities of Fyresdal, Hjartdal, Kviteseid, Midt-Telemark, Nissedal, Nome, Notodden, Seljord, Tinn, Tokke, and Vinje. The deanery is headquartered at Seljord Church in the village of Seljord in Seljord Municipality.

The deanery existed for a long time until 1838 when it was divided into Øvre Telemark Østfjeldske prosti and Øvre Telemark Vestfjeldske prosti. A royal resolution on 19 May 1922 changed the deanery names from "Øvre Telemark Østfjeldske prosti" to "Aust-Telemark prosti" and "Øvre Telemark Vestfjeldske prosti" to "Vest-Telemark prosti". In 2006, Nedre Telemark prosti (established 1843) was dissolved and its parishes were divided between Aust-Telemark prosti and Vest-Telemark prosti. On 1 January 2015, Aust-Telemark prosti and Vest-Telemark prosti were merged to re-form the old Øvre Telemark prosti.

Municipality	Parish (sokn)	Church	Location	Year built	Photo
Fyresdal	Fyresdal	Moland Church	Fyresdal	1843	
Fyresdal	Fyresdal	Veum Church	Øyane	1863	
Hjartdal	Hjartdal	Hjartdal Church	Hjartdal	1809	
Hjartdal	Hjartdal	Sauland Church	Sauland	1863	
Hjartdal	Hjartdal	Tuddal Church	Tuddal	1796	
Kviteseid	Kviteseid	Brunkeberg Church	Brunkeberg	1790	
Kviteseid	Kviteseid	Fjågesund Church	Fjågesund	1916	
Kviteseid	Kviteseid	Kilen Chapel	Kilen	1958	
Kviteseid	Kviteseid	Kviteseid Church	Kviteseid	1918	
Kviteseid	Kviteseid	Old Kviteseid Church	just north of Eidstod	c. 1260	
Kviteseid	Kviteseid	Vrådal Church	Vrådal	1886	
Midt-Telemark	Bø	Bø Church	Bø	1875	
Midt-Telemark	Bø	Old Bø Church	Bø	c. 1100	
Midt-Telemark	Sauherad og Nes	Nes Church	Nesodden (just outside Gvarv)	1180	
Midt-Telemark	Sauherad og Nes	Sauherad Church	Sauherad	1150	
Nissedal	Nissedal	Felle Chapel	Felle	1970	
Nissedal	Nissedal	Nissedal Church	Kyrkjebygda	1764	
Nissedal	Nissedal	Treungen Church	Treungen	1863	
Nome	Holla og Helgen	Helgen Church	Helgja	1735	
Nome	Holla og Helgen	Holla Church	Ulefoss	1867	
Nome	Holla og Helgen	Romnes Church	Romnes	1100s	
Nome	Lunde og Flåbygd	Flåbygd Church	Flåbygd	1822	
Nome	Lunde og Flåbygd	Landsmarka Chapel	Landsmarka	1895	
Nome	Lunde og Flåbygd	Lunde Church	Bjervamoen	1822	
Notodden	Gransherad	Gransherad Church	[[Gransherad]]	1849	
Notodden	Heddal	Heddal Stave Church	[[Heddal]]	1200s	
Notodden	Lisleherad	Lisleherad Church	Landsverk	1873	
Notodden	Notodden	Notodden Church	Notodden	1938	
Seljord	Seljord	Flatdal Church	Flatdal	1654	
Seljord	Seljord	Mandal Chapel	Mandal	1954	
Seljord	Seljord	Seljord Church	Seljord	1180	
Seljord	Seljord	Åmotsdal Church	Åmotsdal	1792	
Tinn	Rjukan	Dal Church	Rjukan	1775	
Tinn	Rjukan	Rjukan Church	Rjukan	1915	
Tinn	Tinn	Atrå Church	Atrå	1836	
Tinn	Tinn	Austbygde Church	Austbygde	1888	
Tinn	Tinn	Hovin Church	Hovin	1850	
Tinn	Tinn	Mæl Church	Miland	1839	
Tokke	Eidsborg, Mo, og Skafså	Eidsborg Stave Church	Eidsborg	1200s	
Tokke	Eidsborg, Mo, og Skafså	Mo Church	Mo	1839	
Tokke	Eidsborg, Mo, og Skafså	Skafså Church	Skafså	1839	
Tokke	Høydalsmo og Lårdal	Høydalsmo Church	Høydalsmo	1747	
Tokke	Høydalsmo og Lårdal	Lårdal Church	Lårdal	1831	
Vinje	Vinje og Nesland	Vinje Church	Vinje	1796	
Vinje	Vinje og Nesland	Nesland Church	Nesland	1847	
Vinje	Grungedal	Grunge Church	Grunge	1850	
Vinje	Rauland	Møsstrond Church	Møsstrond	1923	
Vinje	Rauland	Rauland Church	Raulandsgrend	1803	
Vinje	Øyfjell	Øyfjell Church	Øyfjell	1833	
