= Gulset Church =

Church in Telemark, Norway

- Gulset kirke
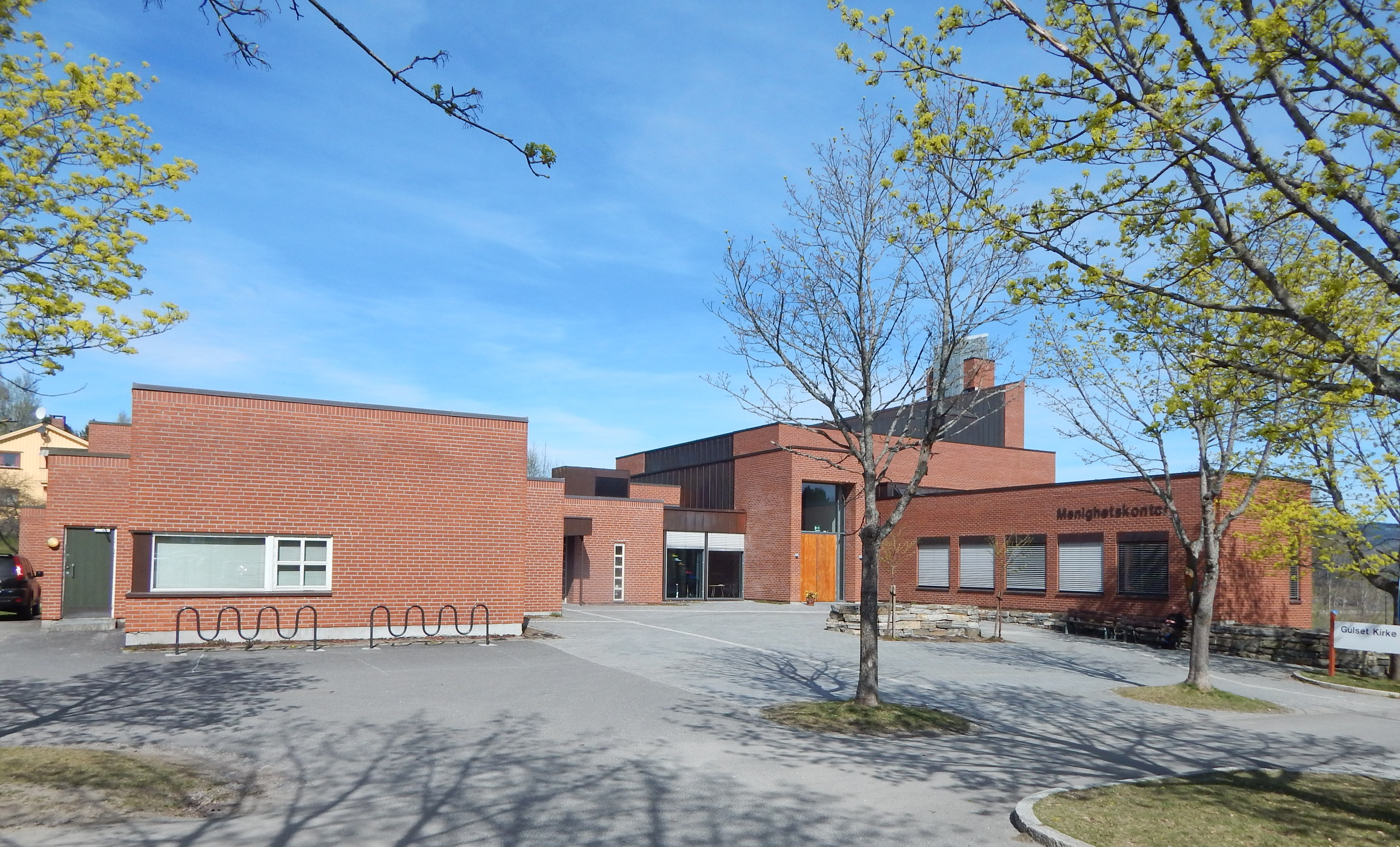
- View of the church
- Gulset Church
- 59°13′03″N 9°34′01″E
- Location: Skien Municipality, Telemark
- Country: Norway
- Denomination: Church of Norway
- Churchmanship: Evangelical Lutheran

History
- Status: Parish church
- Founded: 1986
- Consecrated: 1986

Architecture
- Functional status: Active
- Architect(s): Harald Hille and Reidar Aasen
- Architectural type: Rectangular
- Completed: 1986 (40 years ago)

Specifications
- Capacity: 270
- Materials: Brick

Administration
- Diocese: Agder og Telemark
- Deanery: Skien prosti
- Parish: Gulset og Skotfoss

Gulset Church (Norwegian: Gulset kirke) is a parish church of the Church of Norway in Skien Municipality in Telemark county, Norway. It is located in the village of Gulset. It is one of the churches for the Gulset og Skotfoss parish which is part of the Skien prosti (deanery) in the Diocese of Agder og Telemark. The red brick church was built in a rectangular design in 1986 using plans drawn up by the architect Harald Hille. The church seats about 270 people, but it can be expanded to hold up to 500 people.

== History ==
Gulset grew up as a suburb to the town of Skien and it was part of Gjerpen Municipality until 1964 when it was merged with Skien. Soon after, work began towards getting a church built in Gulset. In 1975, land was acquired by the parish and the planning began for designing the new church by the architects Harald Hille and Reidar Aasen. The plan was to complete the new building around the year 1980. This was delayed, however, and the church construction was postponed. The church was built in two building stages, the first stage was completed and consecrated in 1986 and it included a parish hall, meeting rooms, club rooms, kitchen, cloakrooms, and bathrooms. The construction cost about 4 million kr. Since there was no nave and chancel yet, the parish hall was temporarily used for worship services. The second construction phase was completed in 2009 and it included the nave and chancel, parish offices, and nursery school. The architect for this stage was Reidar Aasen from the firm Børve Borchsenius. Construction costs for this stage totaled about 55 million kr. The building was re-consecrated on 22 March 2009.

== See also ==
- List of churches in Agder og Telemark
