= Tvedestrand =

Tvedestrand may refer to:

== Places ==
- Tvedestrand Municipality, a municipality in Agder county, Norway
- Tvedestrand (town), a town within Tvedestrand Municipality in Agder county, Norway
- Tvedestrand Church, a church in Tvedestrand Municipality in Agder county, Norway
- Tvedestrand videregående skole, an upper secondary school in Tvedestrand Municipality in Agder county, Norway
