= Seljord Church =

Church in Telemark, Norway

- Seljord kyrkje
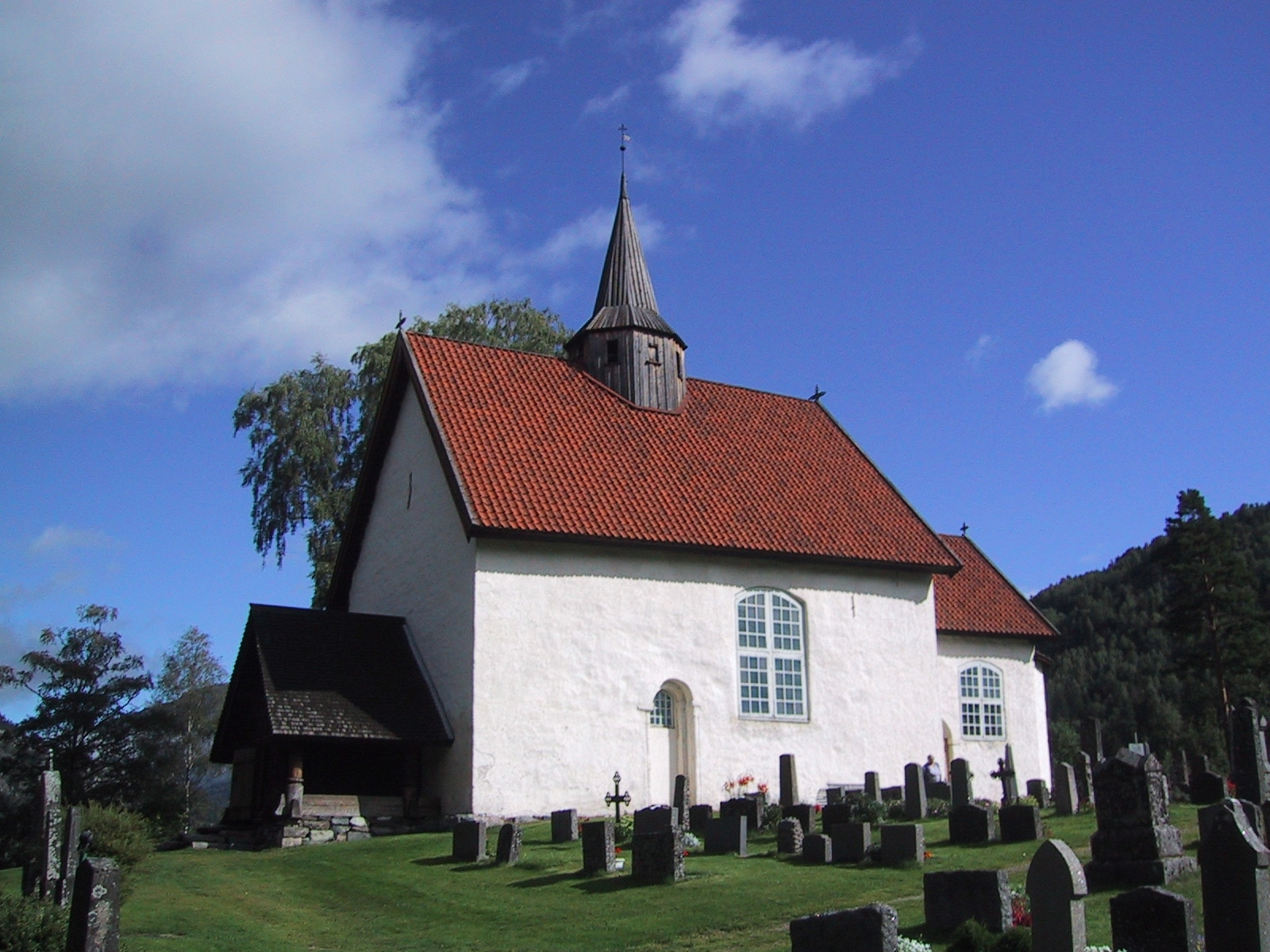
- View of the church
- Seljord Church
- 59°29′23″N 8°38′09″E
- Location: Seljord Municipality, Telemark
- Country: Norway
- Denomination: Church of Norway
- Previous denomination: Catholic Church
- Churchmanship: Evangelical Lutheran

History
- Status: Parish church
- Founded: c. 1180

Architecture
- Functional status: Active
- Architectural type: Long church
- Completed: c. 1180 (846 years ago)

Specifications
- Capacity: 160
- Materials: Stone

Administration
- Diocese: Agder og Telemark
- Deanery: Øvre Telemark prosti
- Parish: Seljord
- Norwegian Cultural Heritage Site
- Type: Church
- Status: Automatically protected
- ID: 85418

Seljord Church (Norwegian: Seljord kyrkje) is a parish church of the Church of Norway in Seljord Municipality in Telemark county, Norway. It is located in the village of Seljord. It is one of the churches for the Seljord parish which is part of the Øvre Telemark prosti (deanery) in the Diocese of Agder og Telemark. The white, stone church was built in a long church design around the year 1180 using plans drawn up by an unknown architect. The church seats about 160 people.

== History ==
The earliest existing historical records of the church date back to the year 1319, but that is not when the church was built. The stone church was built around the year 1180, although construction likely started earlier, possibly as early as 1150. The church has a rectangular nave and chancel with a small tower on the roof of the nave. The chancel has a semi-circular apse on the east end. Around 1630, the church was struck by lightning and it caught fire. Afterwards, the church was rebuilt after the extensive damage from the fire. A new wooden church porch was built on the west end after the fire.

In 1814, this church served as an election church (Norwegian: valgkirke). Together with more than 300 other parish churches across Norway, it was a polling station for elections to the 1814 Norwegian Constituent Assembly which wrote the Constitution of Norway. This was Norway's first national elections. Each church parish was a constituency that elected people called "electors" who later met together in each county to elect the representatives for the assembly that was to meet at Eidsvoll Manor later that year.

== Media gallery ==
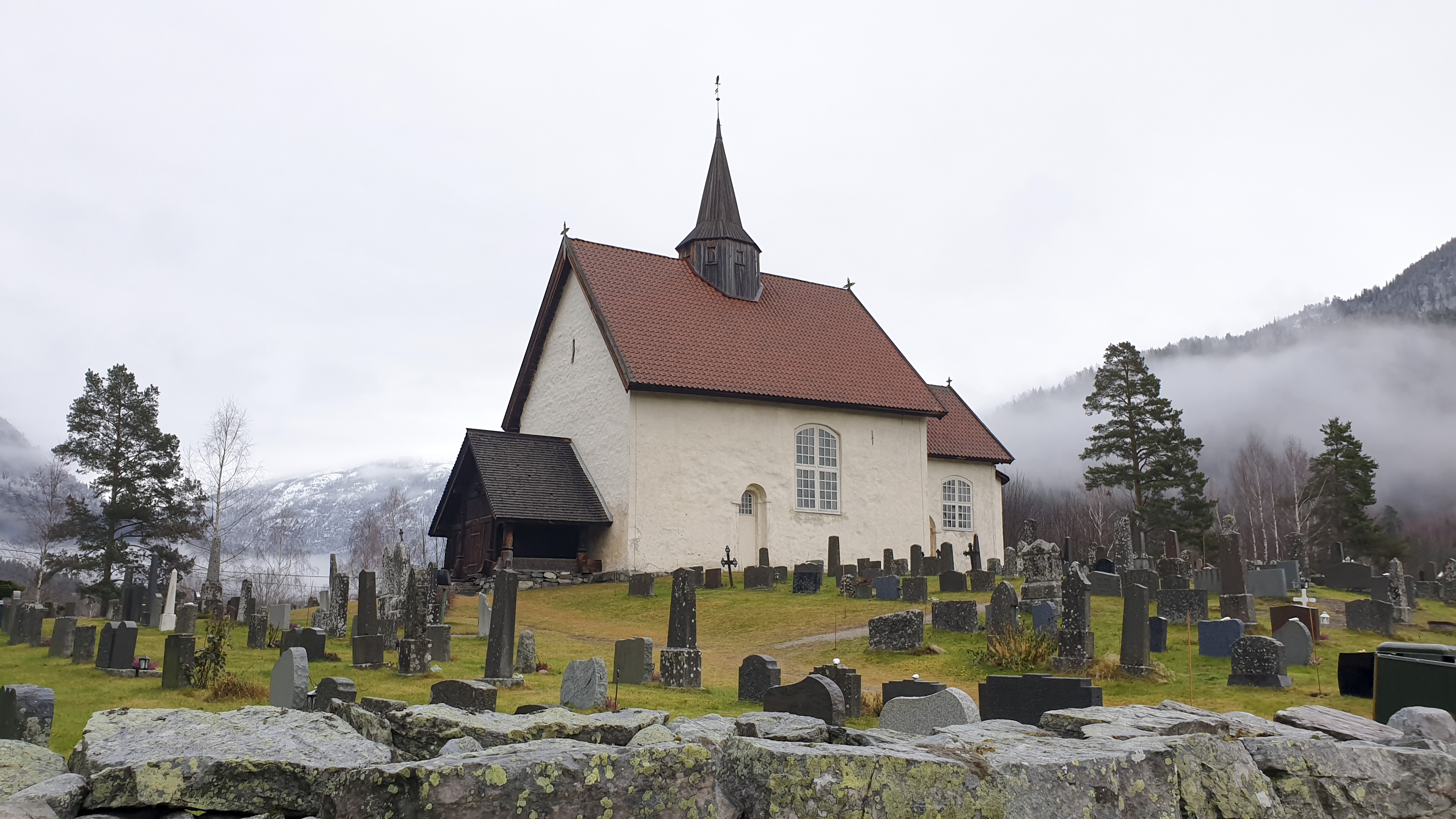

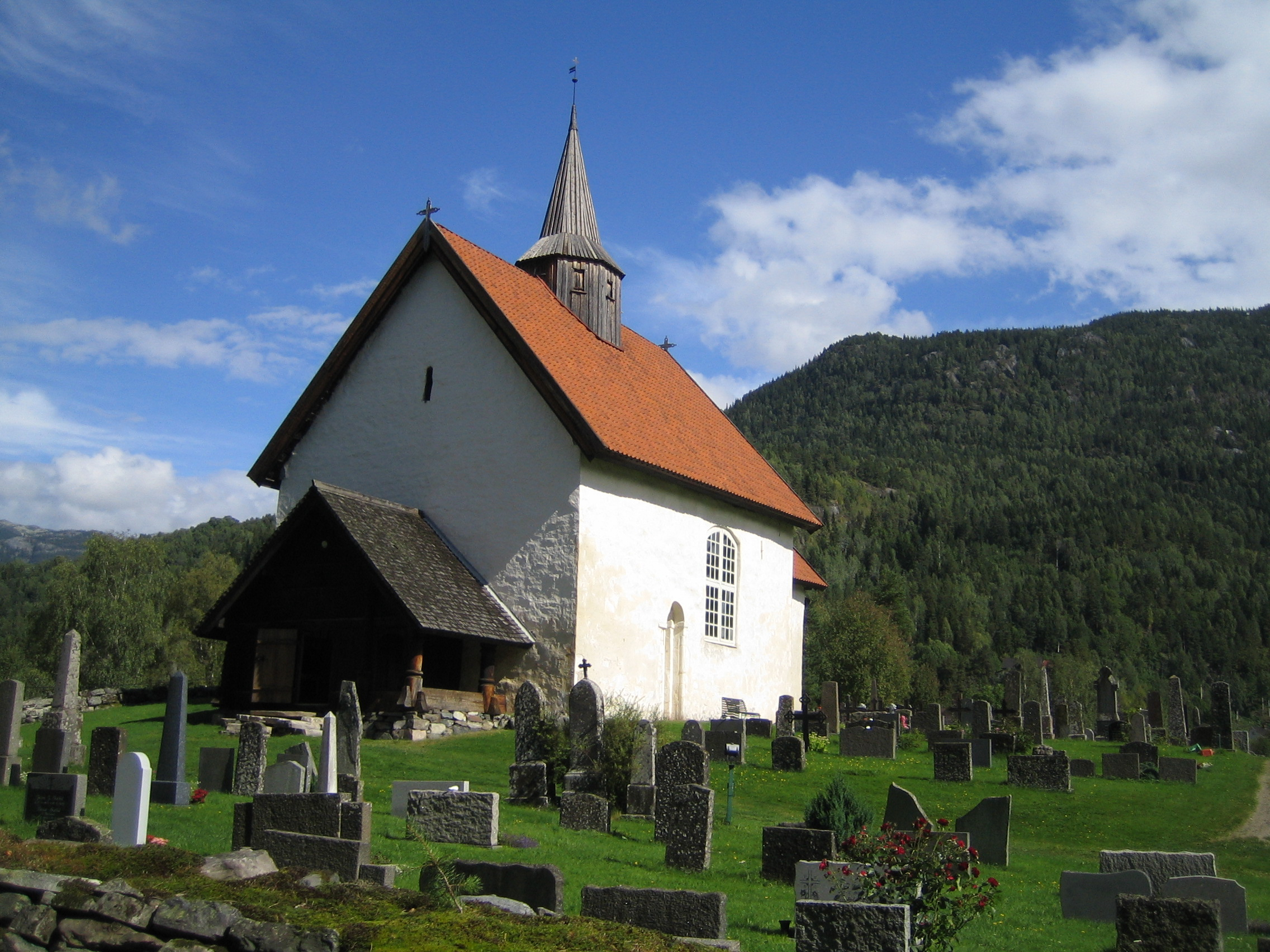

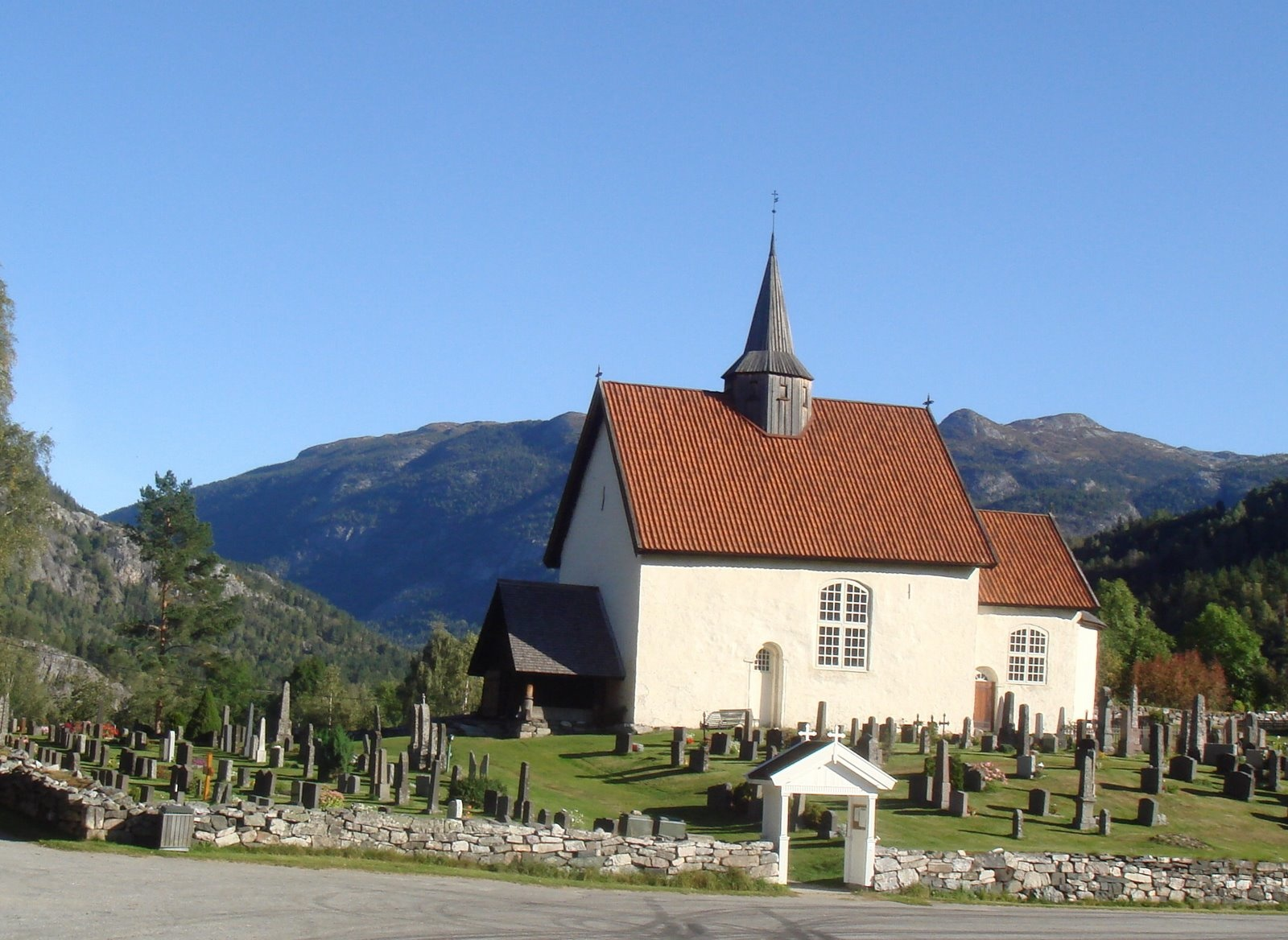

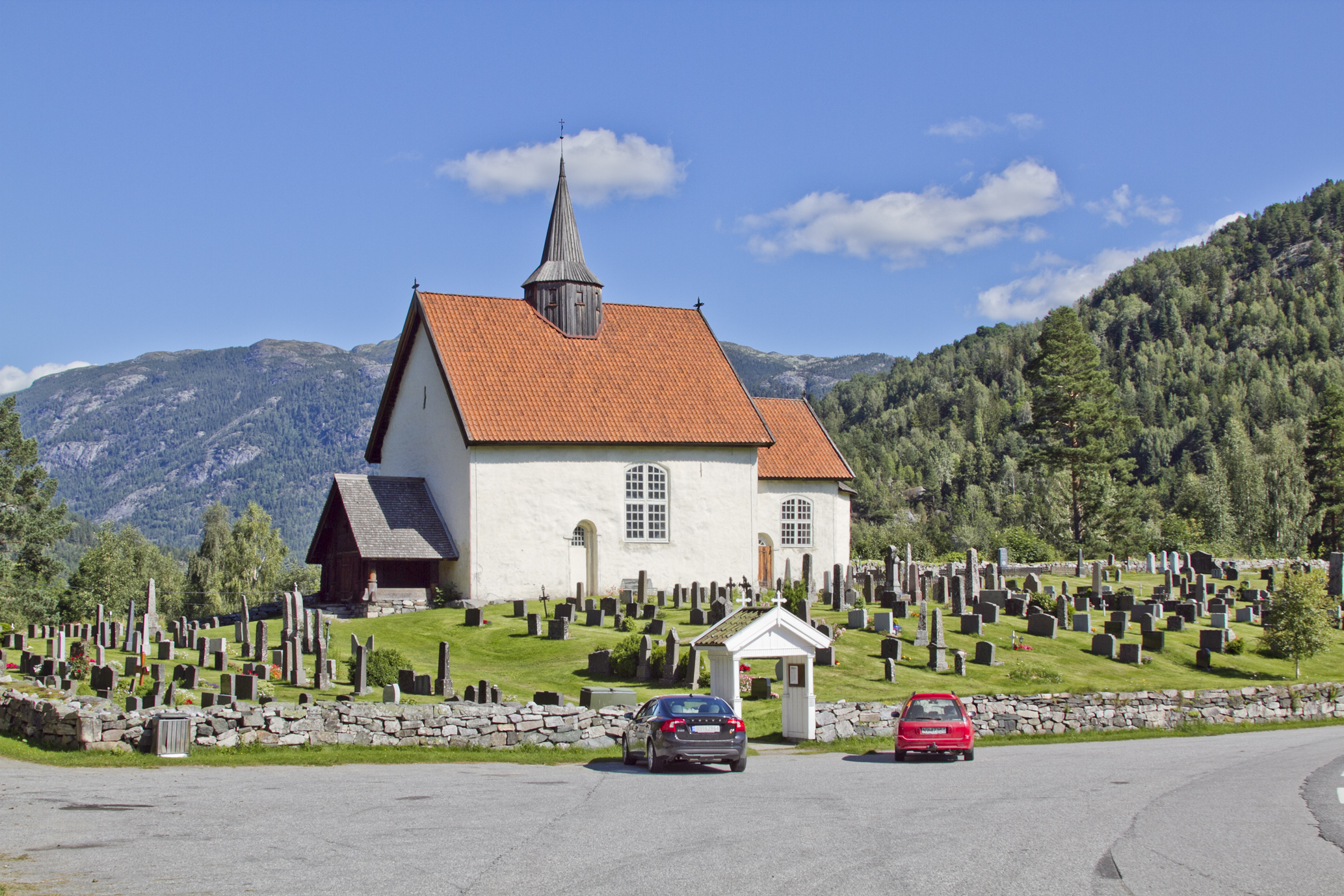

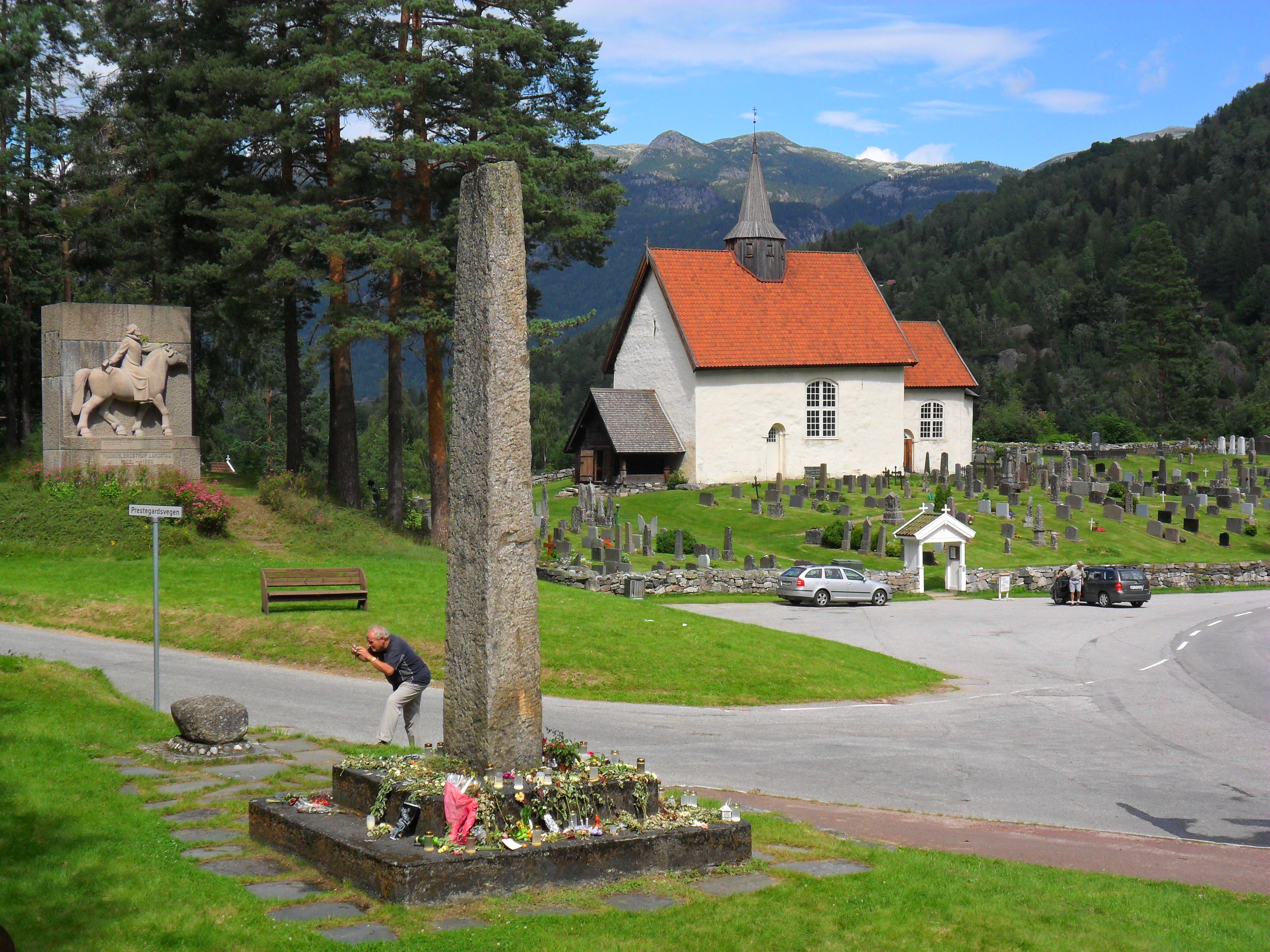

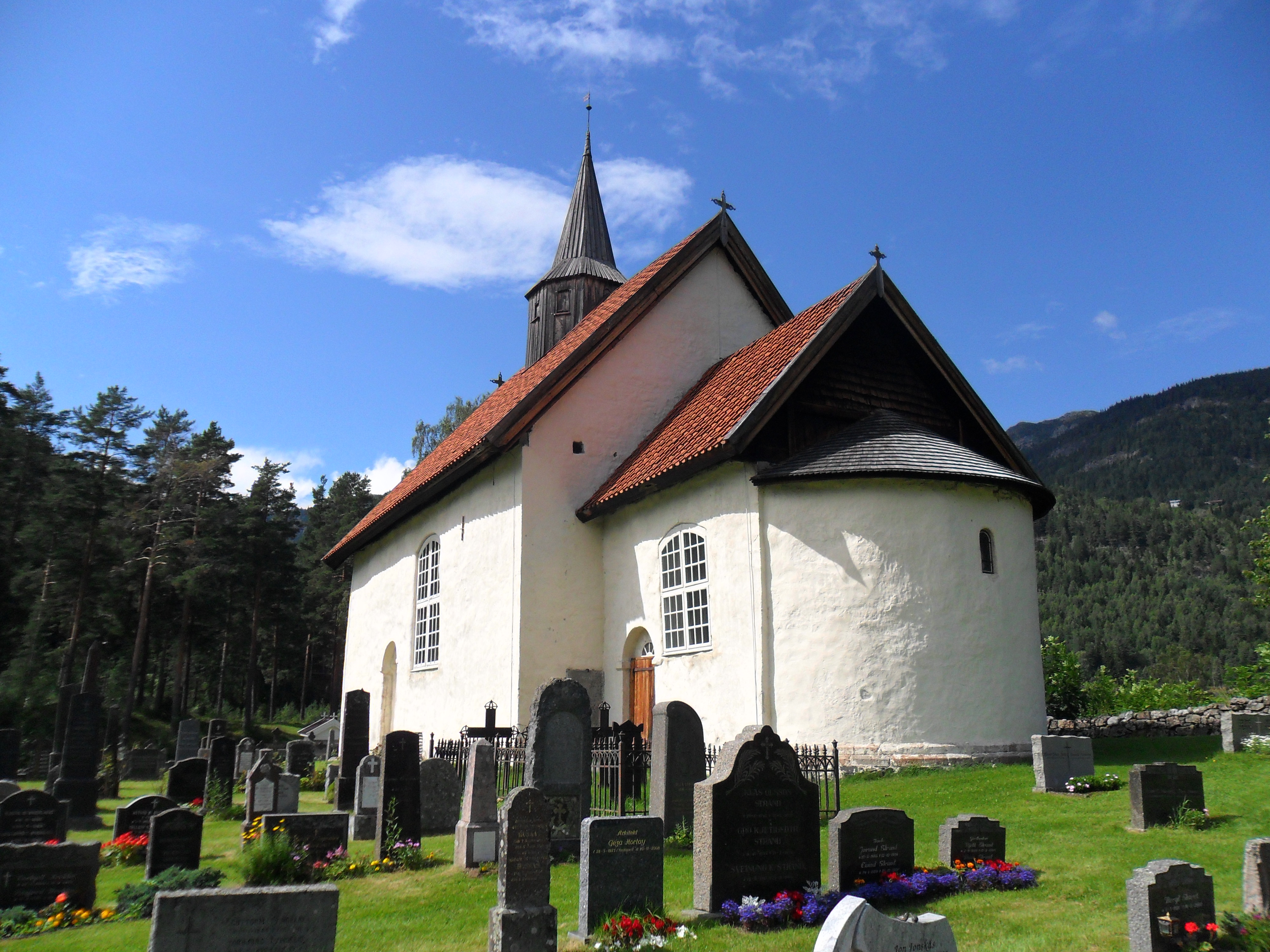

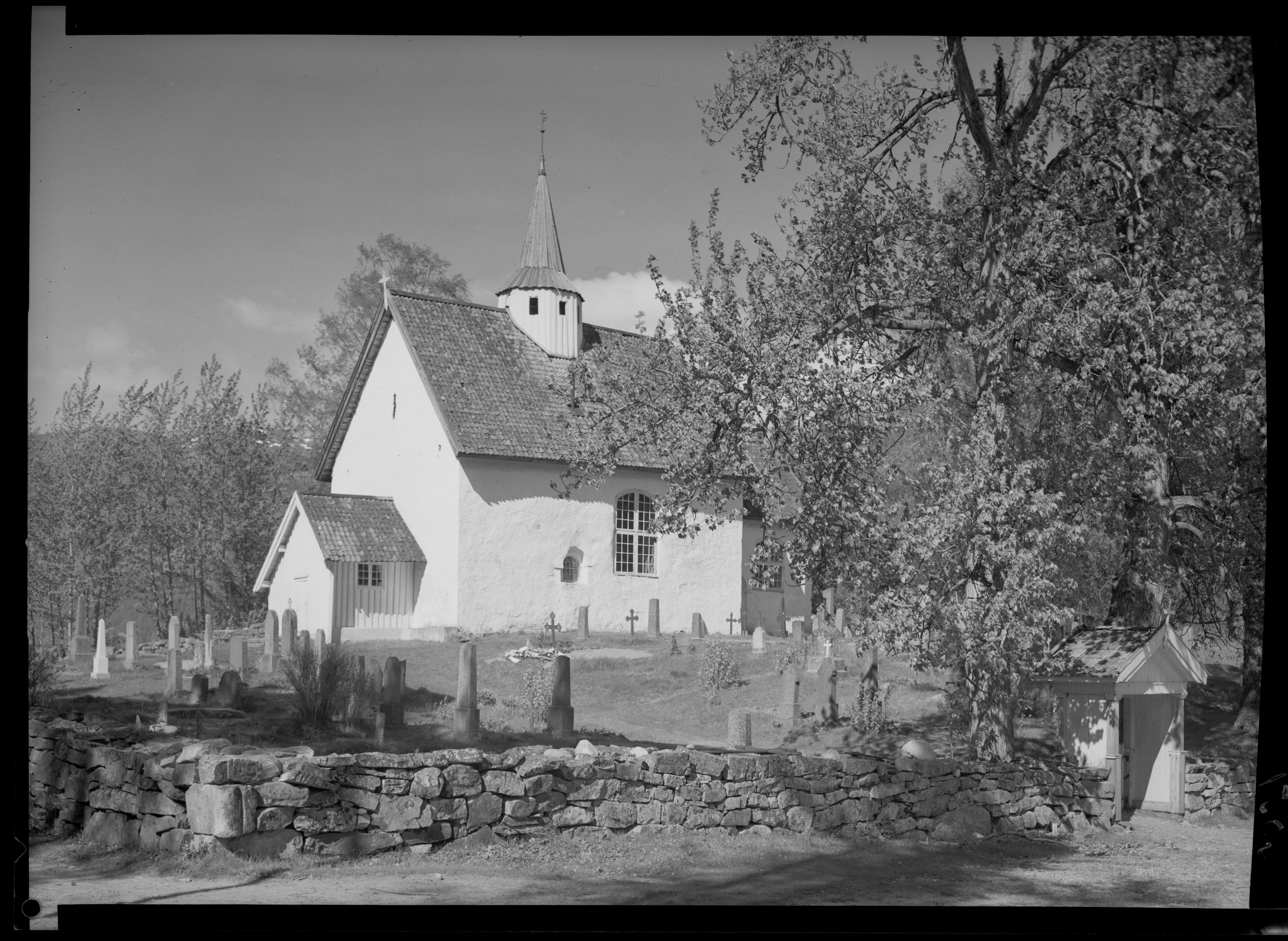

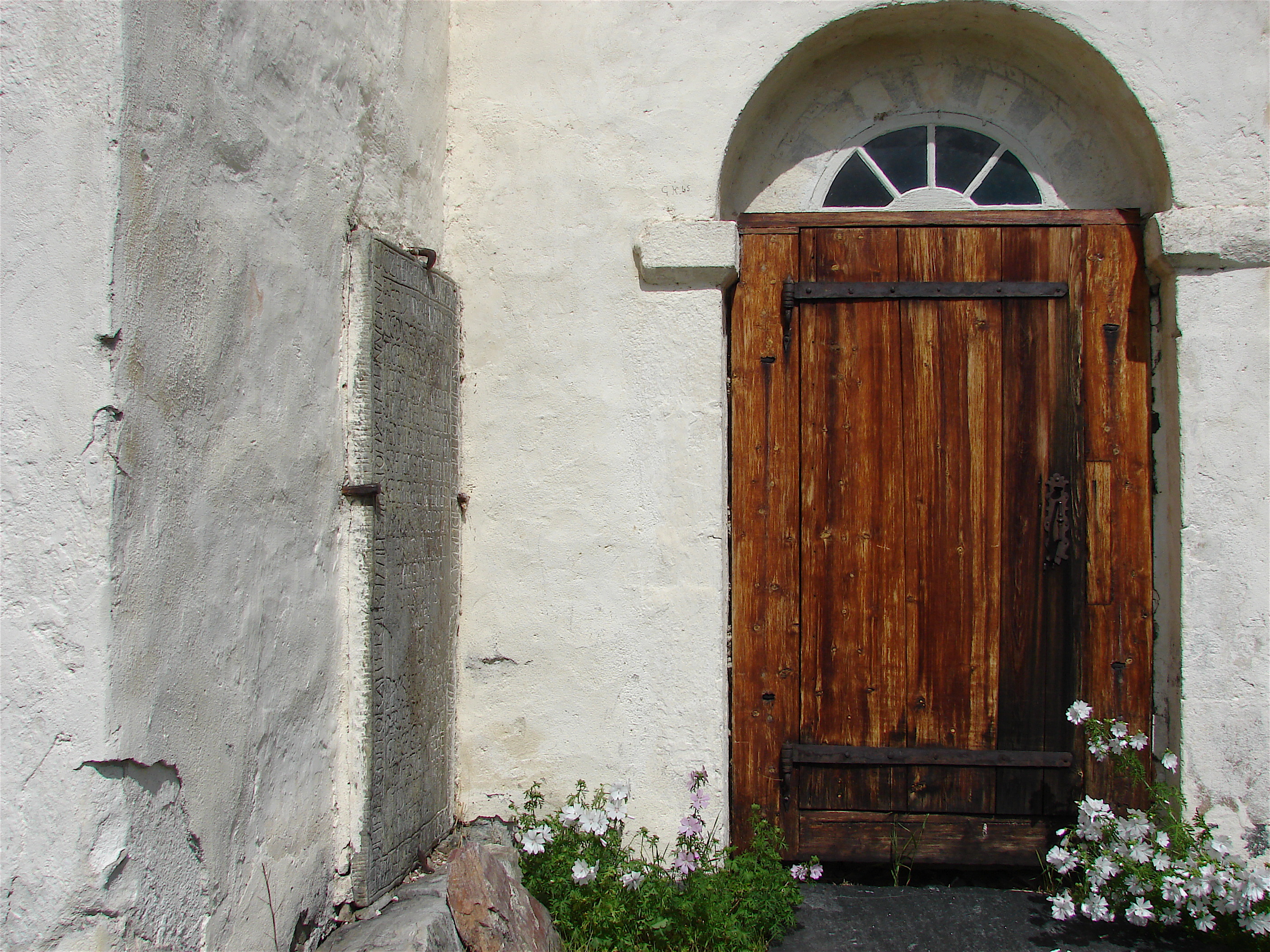

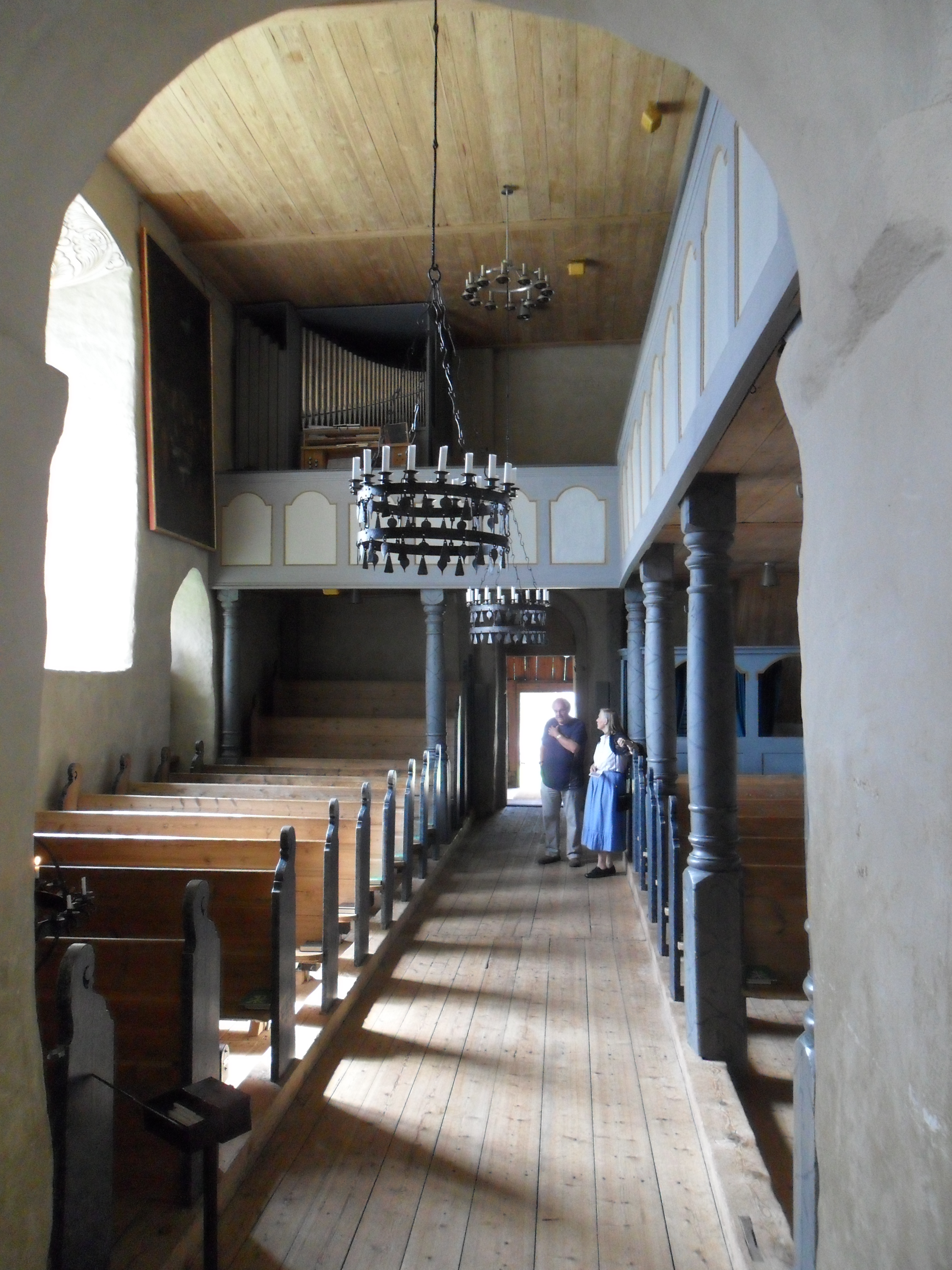

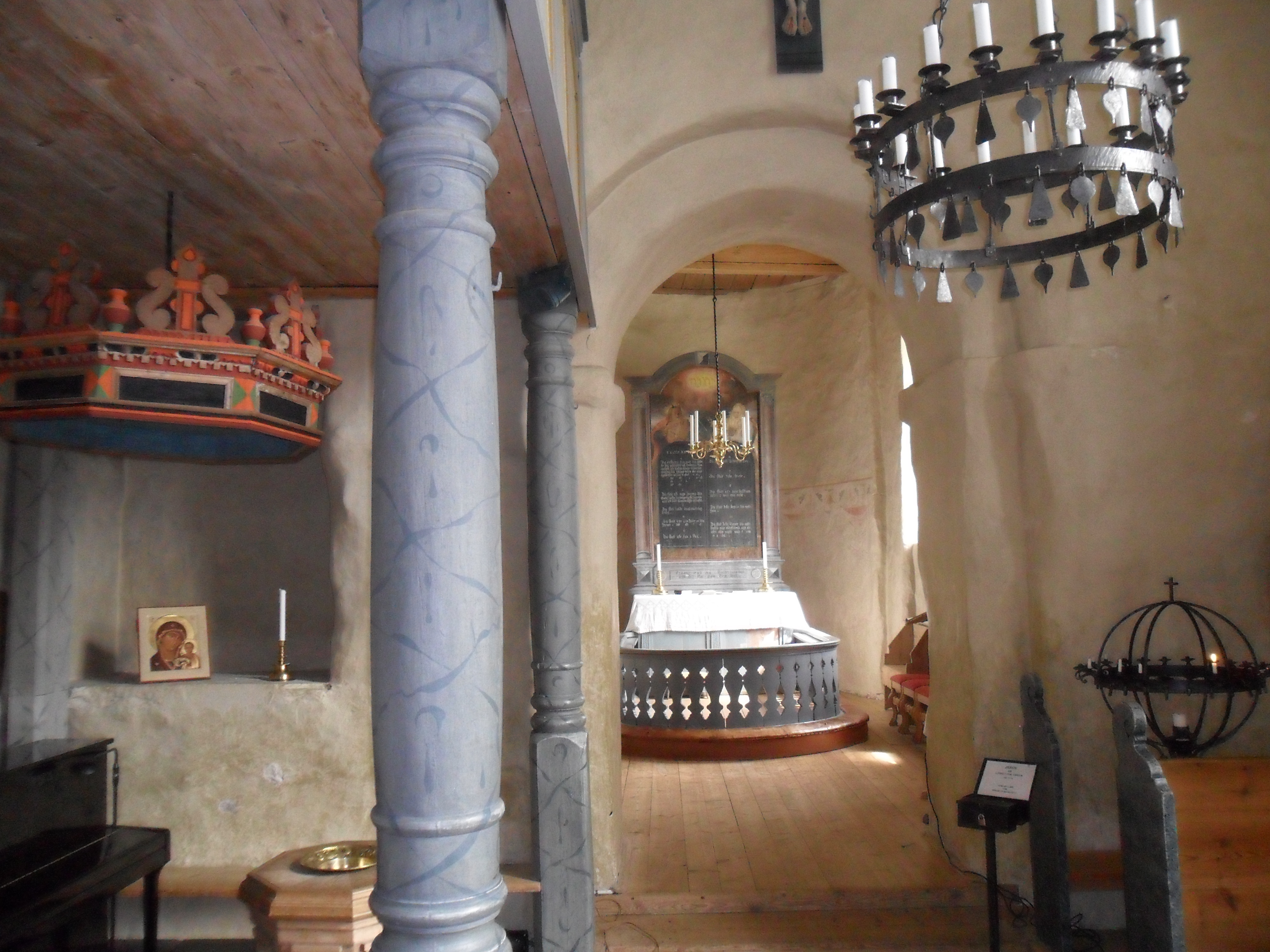

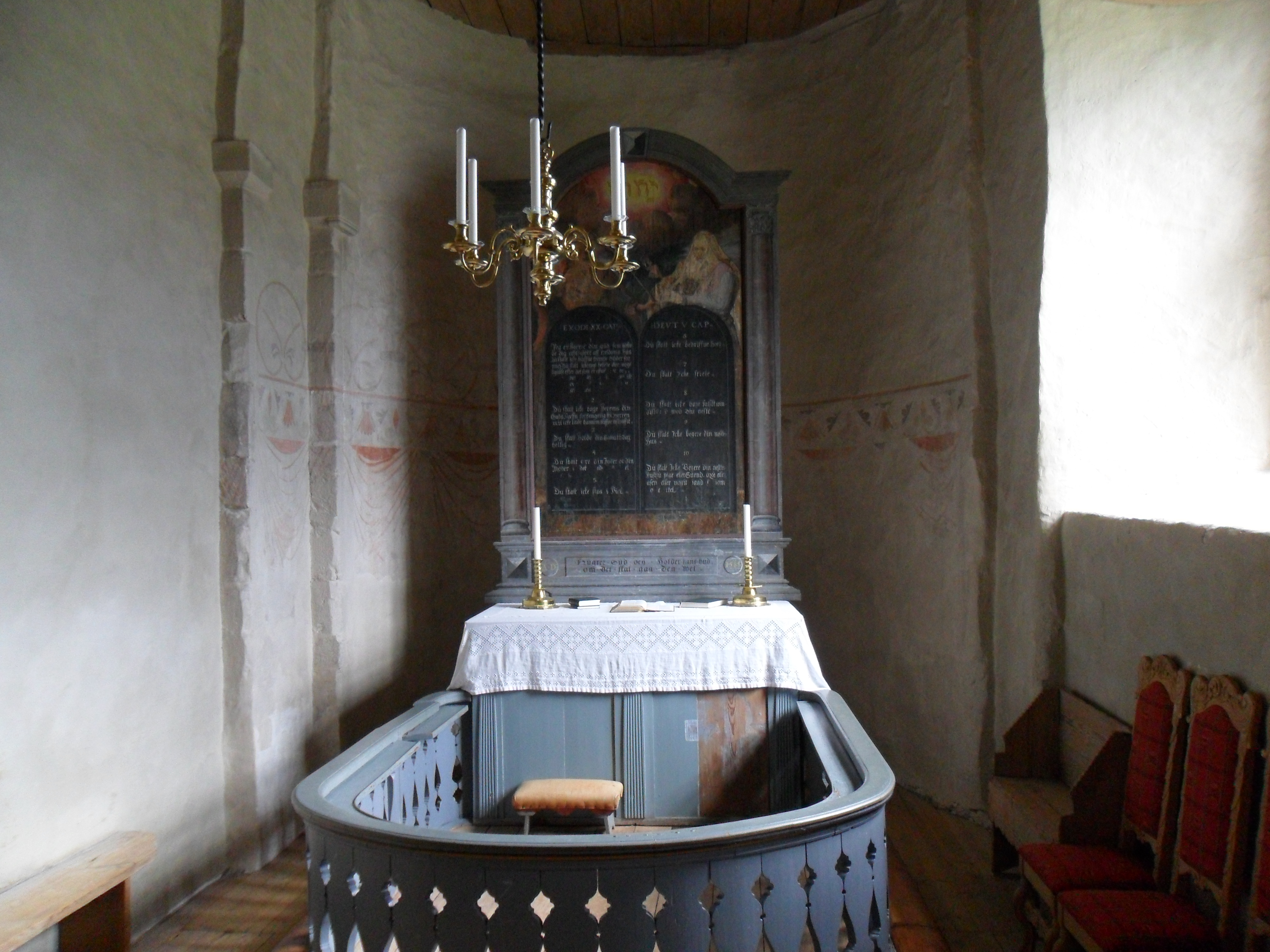

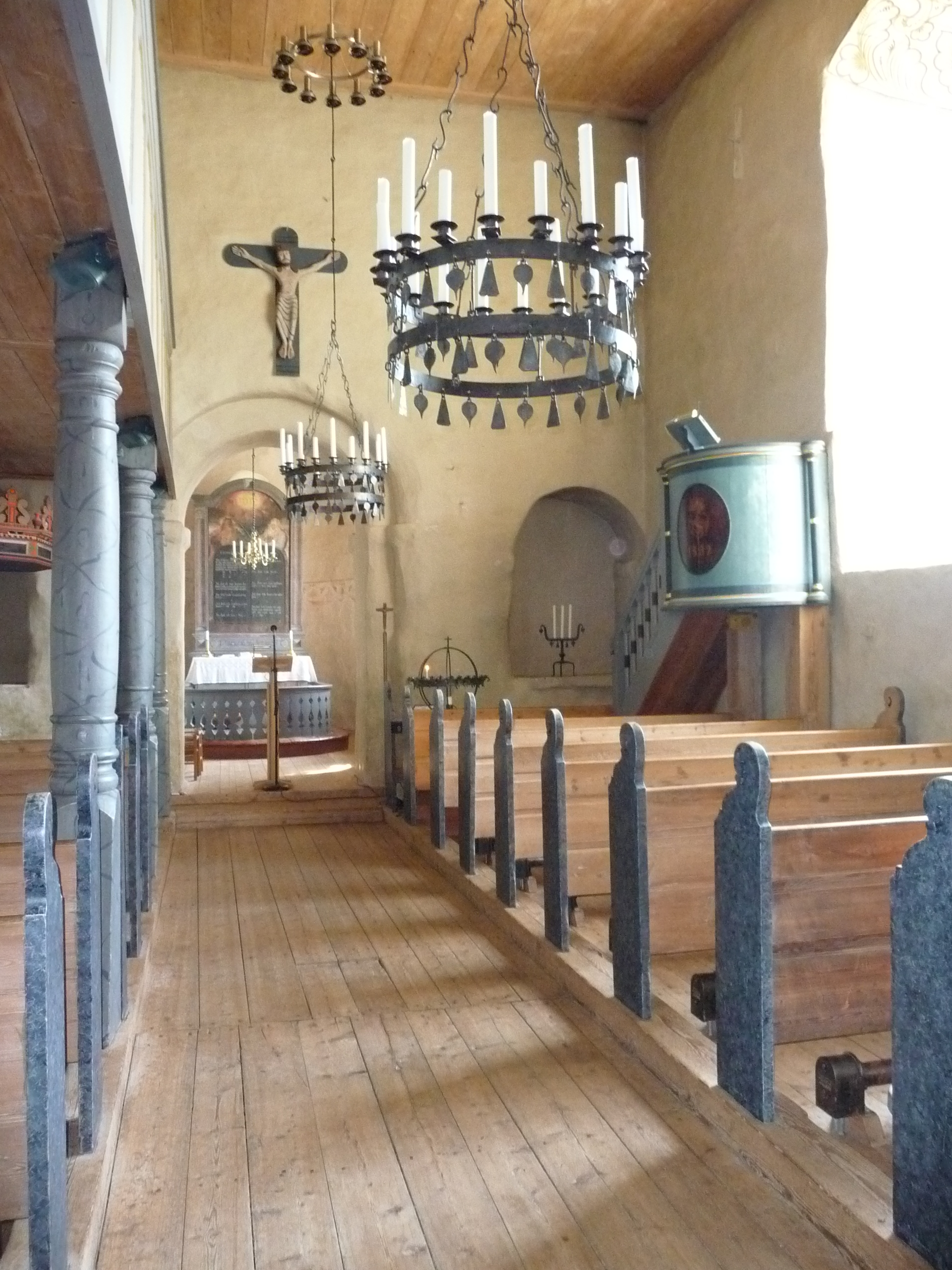

== See also ==
- List of churches in Agder og Telemark
