= Gimsøy Church (Telemark) =

Church in Telemark, Norway

- Gimsøy kirke
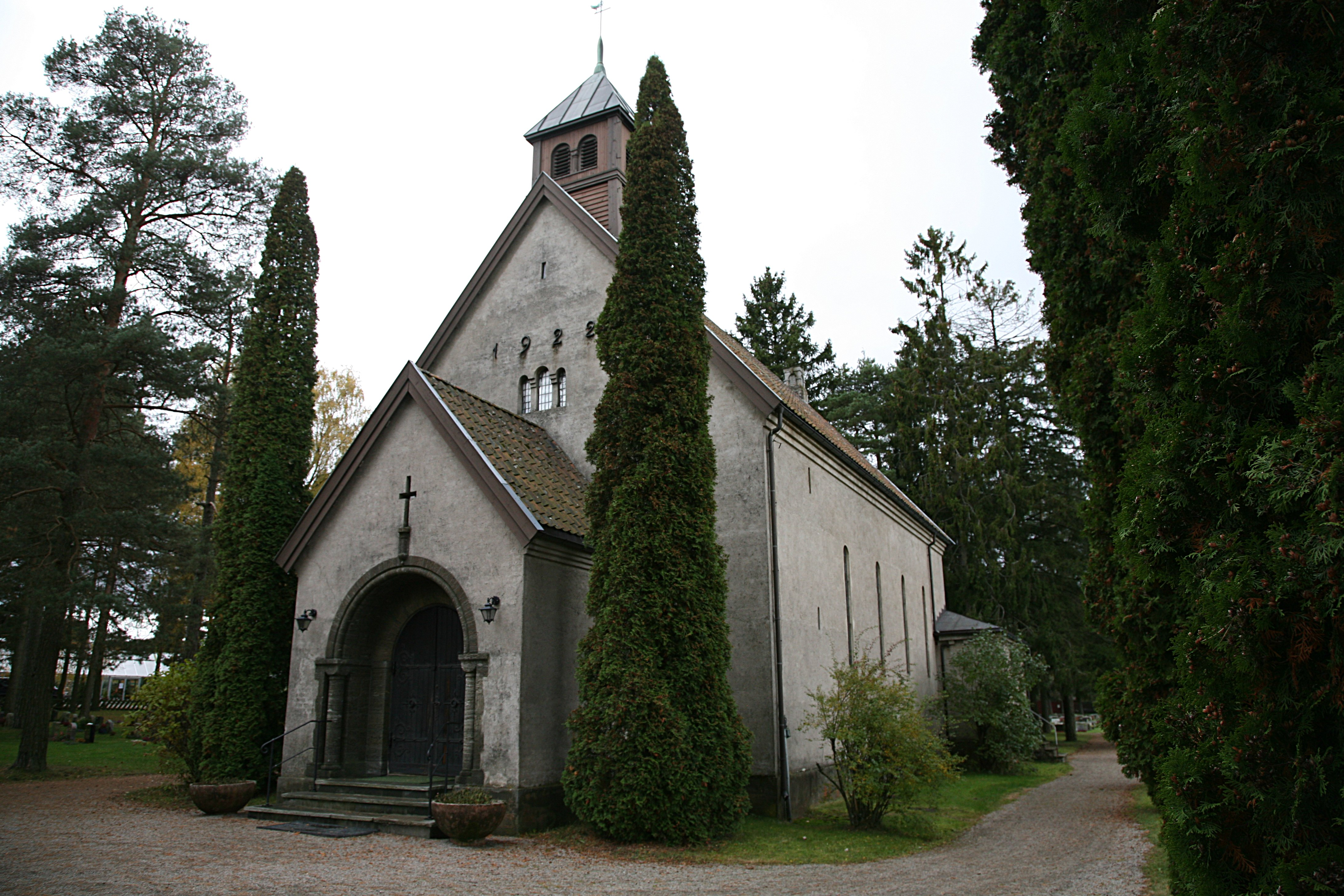
- View of the church
- Gimsøy Church
- 59°11′31″N 9°36′16″E
- Location: Skien Municipality, Telemark
- Country: Norway
- Denomination: Church of Norway
- Churchmanship: Evangelical Lutheran

History
- Status: Parish church
- Founded: 1922
- Consecrated: 10 December 1922

Architecture
- Functional status: Active
- Architect: Gunnar Norby
- Architectural type: Long church
- Completed: 1922 (104 years ago)

Specifications
- Capacity: 200
- Materials: Stone

Administration
- Diocese: Agder og Telemark
- Deanery: Skien prosti
- Parish: Gimsøy og Nenset
- Norwegian Cultural Heritage Site
- Type: Church
- Status: Listed
- ID: 84242

Gimsøy Church (Norwegian: Gimsøy kirke) is a parish church of the Church of Norway in Skien Municipality in Telemark county, Norway. It is located in the Gimsøy area of the town of Skien. It is one of the churches for the Gimsøy og Nenset parish which is part of the Skien prosti (deanery) in the Diocese of Agder og Telemark. The gray, stone church was built in a long church design in 1922 using plans drawn up by the architect Gunnar Norby. The church seats about 200 people.

== History ==
Gimsøy Abbey was a large farm owner and powerful entity in the Skien area during the Middle Ages. It was located on the island of Gimsøy which was located in the Farelva river (now the island is known as Klosterøya, meaning "Abbey Island"). The Abbey was closed after the Reformation and then it burned down in 1546, with no trace of it left today. After the town of Skien was enlarged in 1916, it became important for this area to have its own chapel and cemetery. The cemetery was built first — in 1919 — and then the chapel followed a couple of years later on a site about 750 metres (2,460 ft) to the southwest of the old Abbey site. The new Gimsøy Chapel was designed by Gunnar Nordby and it was consecrated on 10 December 1922. The new chapel was built as a long church out of plastered stone. The choir has an apse on its east end and it's surrounded by a sacristy. The church was restored in 1972, when windows with stained glass were inserted in the choir wall.

== Media gallery ==
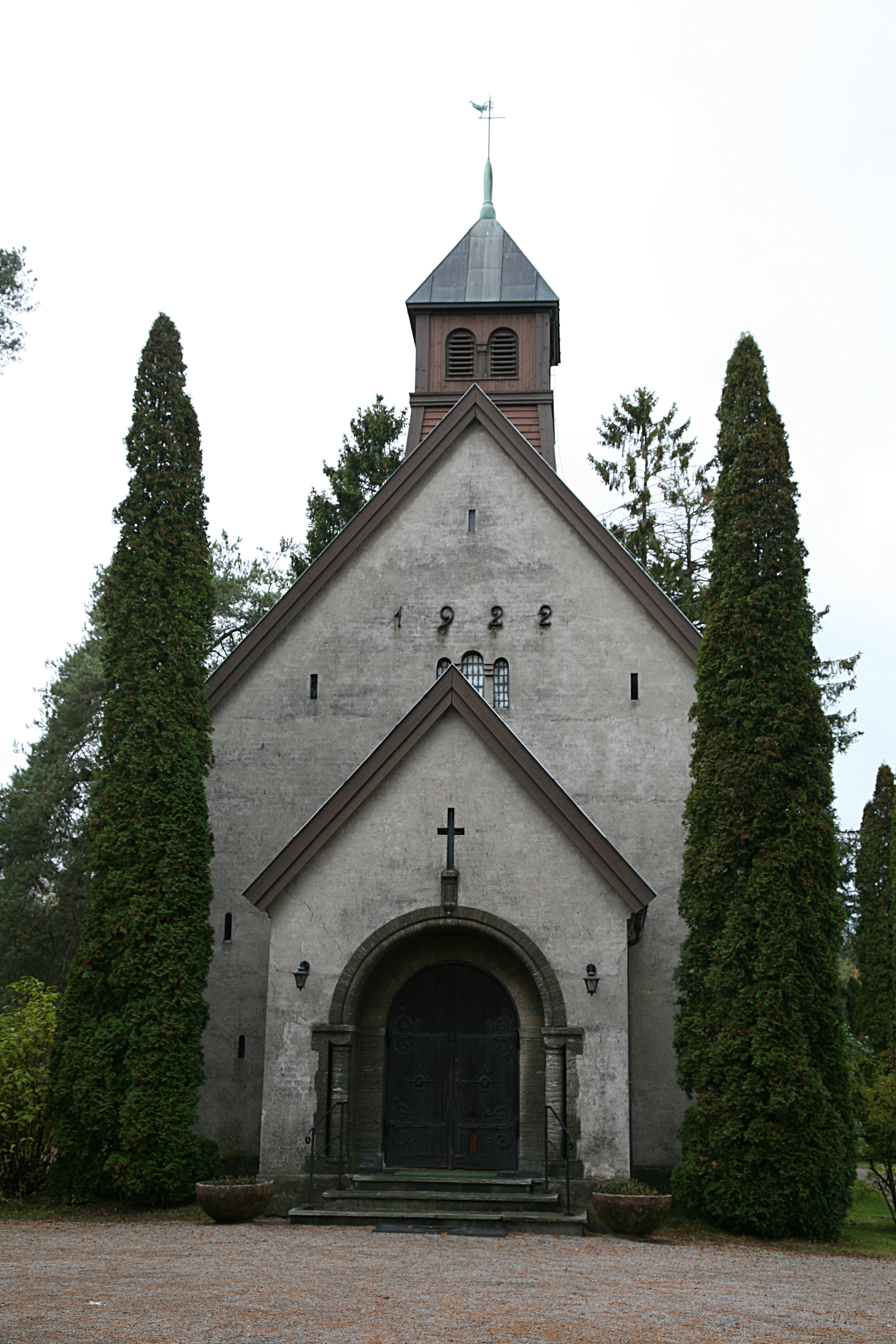

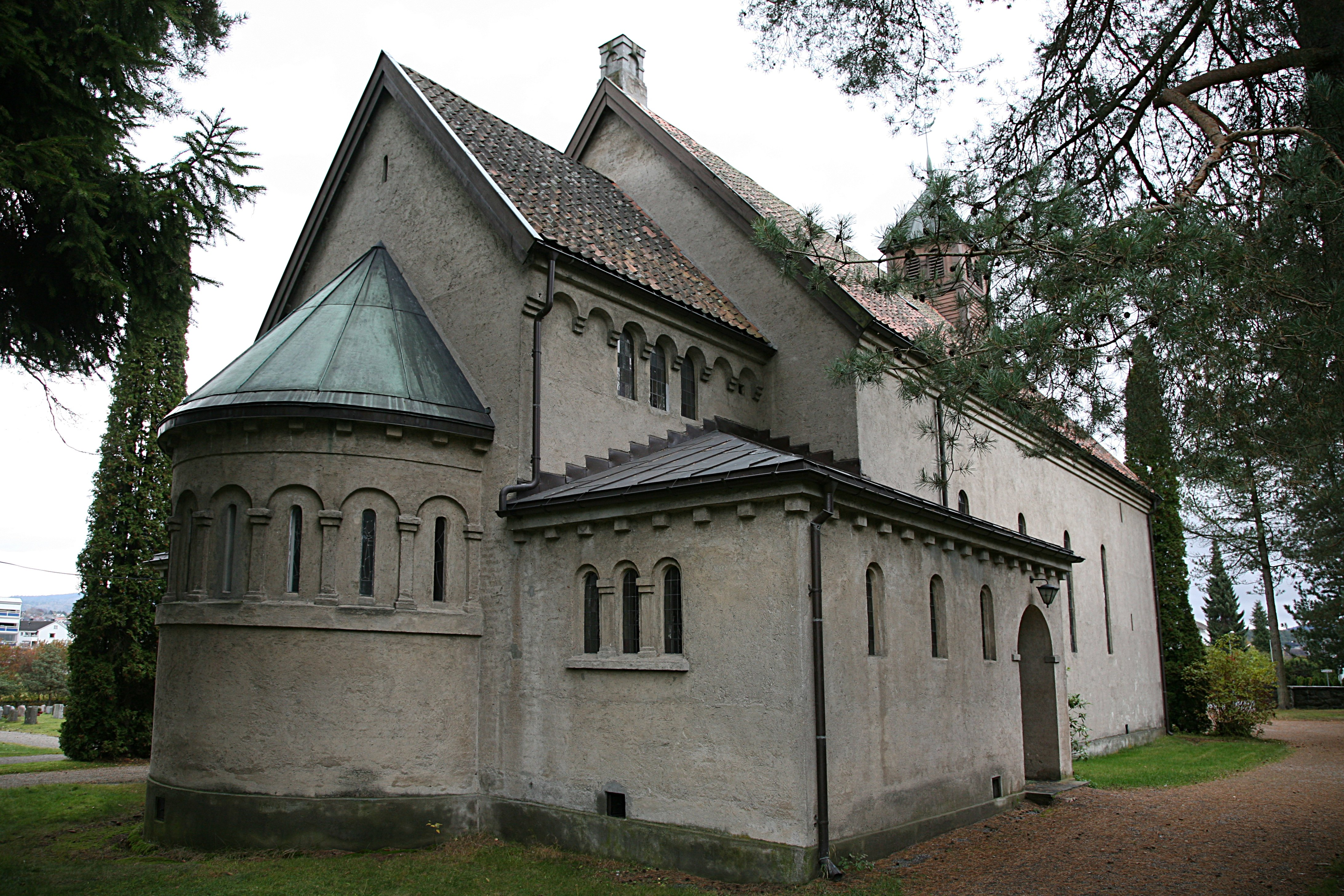

== See also ==
- List of churches in Agder og Telemark
