= Lund Church (Agder) =

Church in Agder, Norway

- Lund kirke
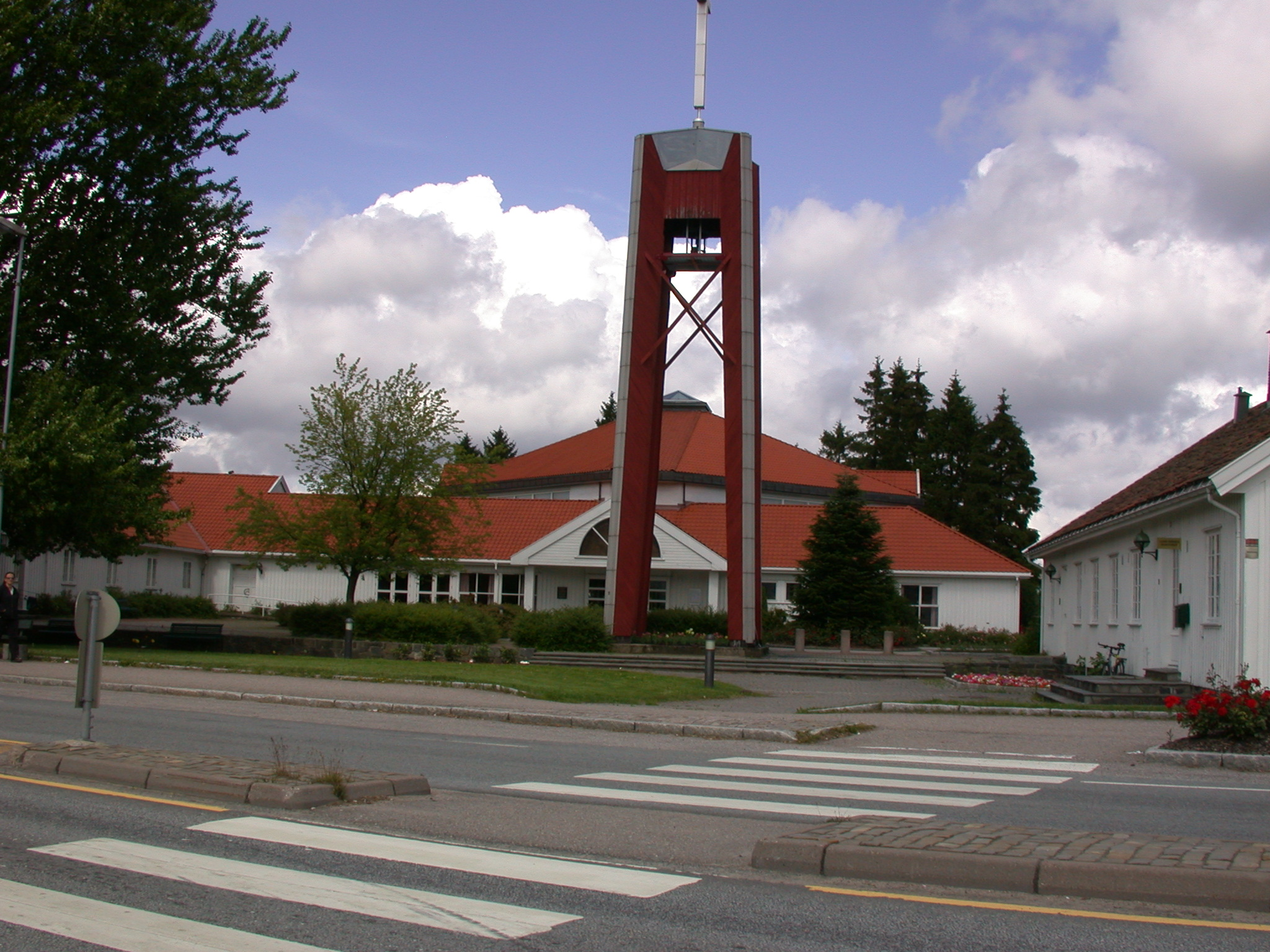
- View of the church
- Lund Church
- 58.1526°N 08.0121°E
- Location: Kristiansand Municipality, Agder
- Country: Norway
- Denomination: Church of Norway
- Churchmanship: Evangelical Lutheran

History
- Status: Parish church
- Founded: 1958
- Consecrated: 1987

Architecture
- Functional status: Active
- Architect(s): Landsverk and Nordbø
- Architectural type: Hexagonal
- Completed: 1987 (39 years ago)

Specifications
- Capacity: 360
- Materials: Brick

Administration
- Diocese: Agder og Telemark
- Deanery: Kristiansand domprosti
- Parish: Lund

Lund Church (Norwegian: Lund kirke) is a parish church of the Church of Norway in Kristiansand Municipality in Agder county, Norway. It is located in the district of Lund in the borough of Lund near the central part of the city of Kristiansand. It is the church for the Lund parish which is part of the Kristiansand domprosti (arch-deanery) in the Diocese of Agder og Telemark. The white, brick church was built in a hexagonal design in 1987 using plans drawn up by the architects J. Landsverk and Nordbø. The church seats about 360 people.

== History ==
The church was founded in 1958 when a former German field hospital was rebuilt according to drawings by Alv Erikstad to be an interim church. On the night of 13 June 1985, the church burned down. A new church was constructed on the same site and it was completed in 1987. The present design of the church includes the main sanctuary, church hall, fireplace room, baptismal room, two kitchens, offices, and a kindergarten. Outside the church, there is a free-standing bell tower.

== Media gallery ==
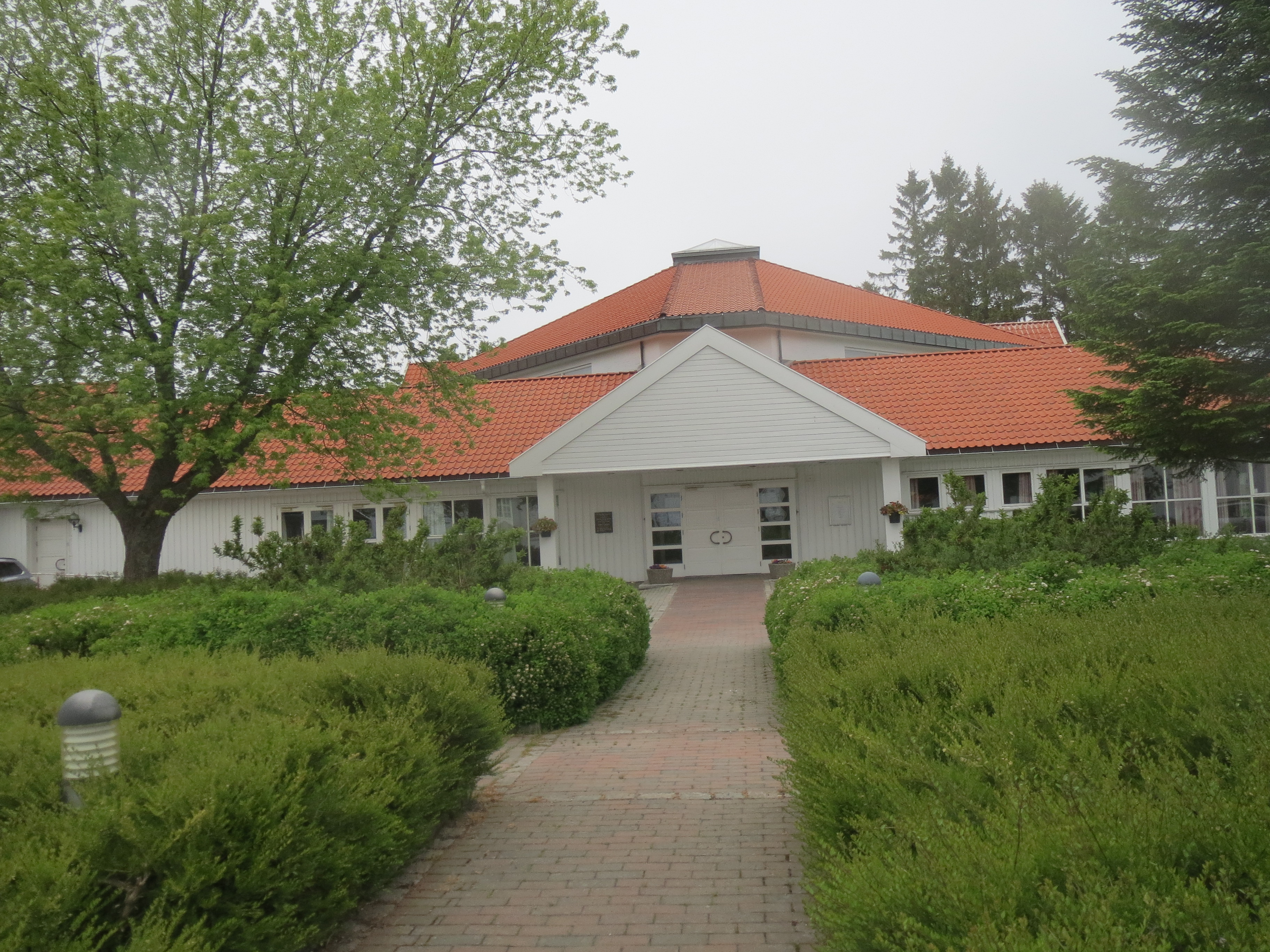
The main entrance to the church building

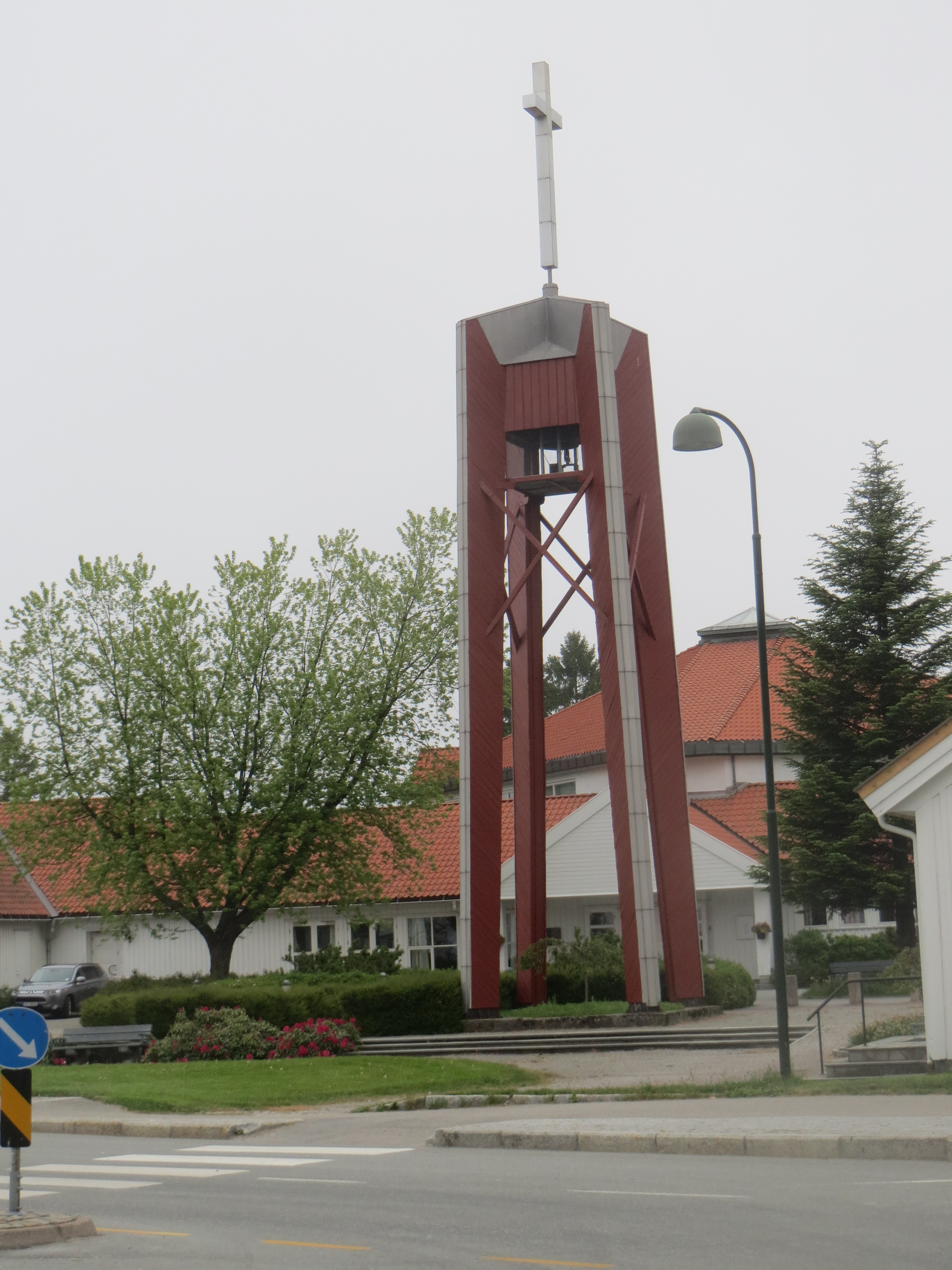
The bell tower

== See also ==
- List of churches in Agder og Telemark
