= Felle Chapel =

Church in Telemark, Norway

- Felle kapell
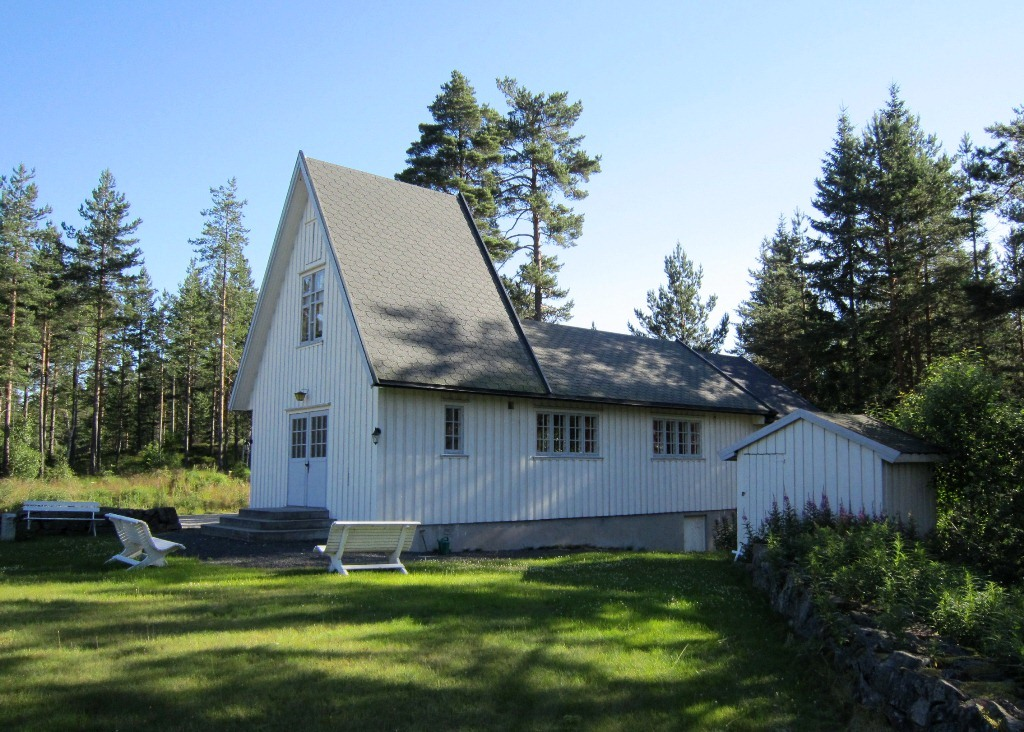
- View of the church
- Felle Chapel
- 58°54′09″N 8°44′58″E
- Location: Nissedal Municipality, Telemark
- Country: Norway
- Denomination: Church of Norway
- Churchmanship: Evangelical Lutheran

History
- Status: Parish church
- Founded: 1971
- Consecrated: 3 October 1971

Architecture
- Functional status: Active
- Architectural type: Long church
- Completed: 1970 (56 years ago)

Specifications
- Capacity: 80
- Materials: Wood

Administration
- Diocese: Agder og Telemark
- Deanery: Øvre Telemark prosti
- Parish: Nissedal

Felle Chapel (Norwegian: Felle kapell) is a parish church of the Church of Norway in Nissedal Municipality in Telemark county, Norway. It is located in the village of Felle. It is one of the churches for the Nissedal parish which is part of the Øvre Telemark prosti (deanery) in the Diocese of Agder og Telemark. The white, wooden church was built in a long church design in 1970 using plans drawn up by an unknown architect. The church seats about 80 people.

== History ==
A new cemetery in Felle was established in 1880 to serve the residents of the Felle area. After a flood in 1968, the small tool shed on the site was destroyed. Afterwards, the parish made plans to build a new burial chapel on the site. The new chapel was opened in December of 1970. The new building proved to be popular and the local residents wanted to hold church services there, so about a year later the building was consecrated for church services on 3 October 1971.

== See also ==
- List of churches in Agder og Telemark
