= Nenset Church =

Church in Telemark, Norway

- Nenset kirke
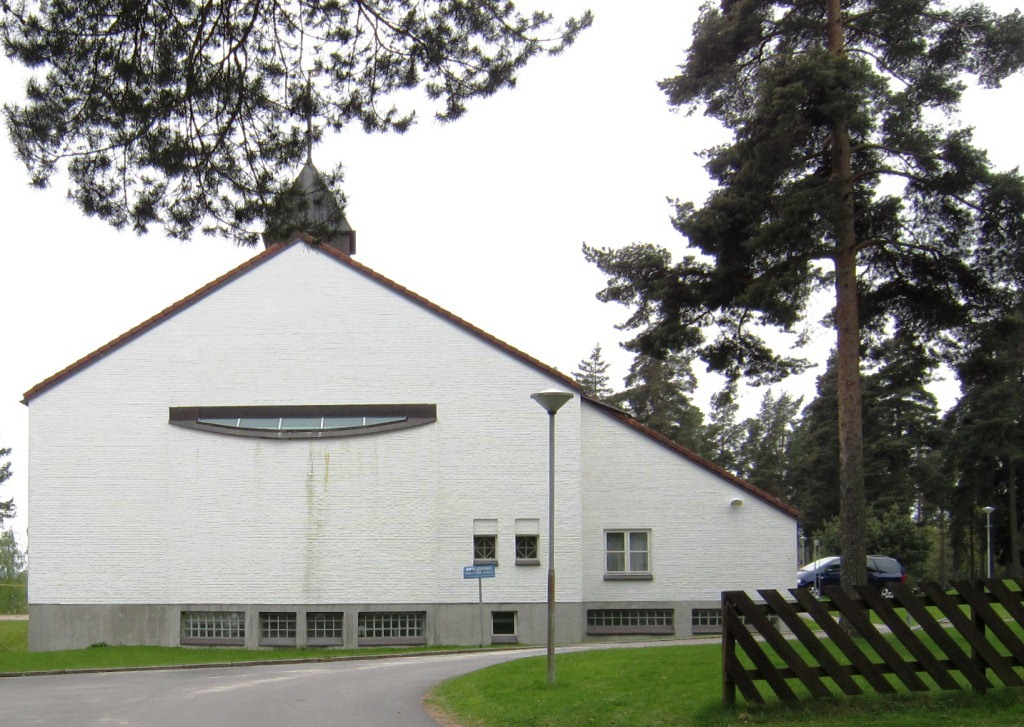
- View of the church
- Nenset Church
- 59°10′05″N 9°37′48″E
- Location: Skien Municipality, Telemark
- Country: Norway
- Denomination: Church of Norway
- Churchmanship: Evangelical Lutheran

History
- Former name: Nenset kapell
- Status: Parish church
- Founded: 1961
- Consecrated: 17 December 1961

Architecture
- Functional status: Active
- Architect(s): Gudolf Blakstad and H. Munthe-Kaas
- Architectural type: Long church
- Completed: 1961 (65 years ago)

Specifications
- Capacity: 400
- Materials: Brick

Administration
- Diocese: Agder og Telemark
- Deanery: Skien prosti
- Parish: Gimsøy og Nenset
- Norwegian Cultural Heritage Site
- Type: Church
- Status: Not protected
- ID: 85101

Nenset Church (Norwegian: Nenset kirke) is a parish church of the Church of Norway in Skien Municipality in Telemark county, Norway. It is located in the Nenset/Tollnes area in the western part of the town of Skien. It is one of the churches for the Gimsøy og Nenset parish which is part of the Skien prosti (deanery) in the Diocese of Agder og Telemark. Constructed in 1961 from white brick, Nenset Church was designed by architects Gudolf Blakstad and Herman Munthe-Kaas in the long church style. The church has a seating capacity of approximately 400 people.

== History ==
Following World War II, there was a desire to establish an annex chapel and cemetery in the Nense/Tollnes area, located just west of Skien town within the then Solum Municipality. After some fundraising, this was approved. Gudolf Blakstad and Herman Munthe-Kaas were hired to design the new building. The building had a chapel on the 2nd floor with space for approximately 200 people, while there was a parish hall and kitchen on the 1st floor. The building was consecrated on 17 December 1961. This was intended to be a two-stage construction project with a larger church to be built later. In 1988, the Nenset Chapel was upgraded to parish church status and re-titled as Nenset Church. In 1996, the second phase of construction was completed under the direction of architect Tor Arlid Danielsen. A new church room was completed and parish offices were added into the older part of the building. The newly-enlarged building was re-consecrated on 19 January 1997.

== See also ==
- List of churches in Agder og Telemark
