= Korshamn Chapel =

Church in Agder, Norway

- Korshamn kapell
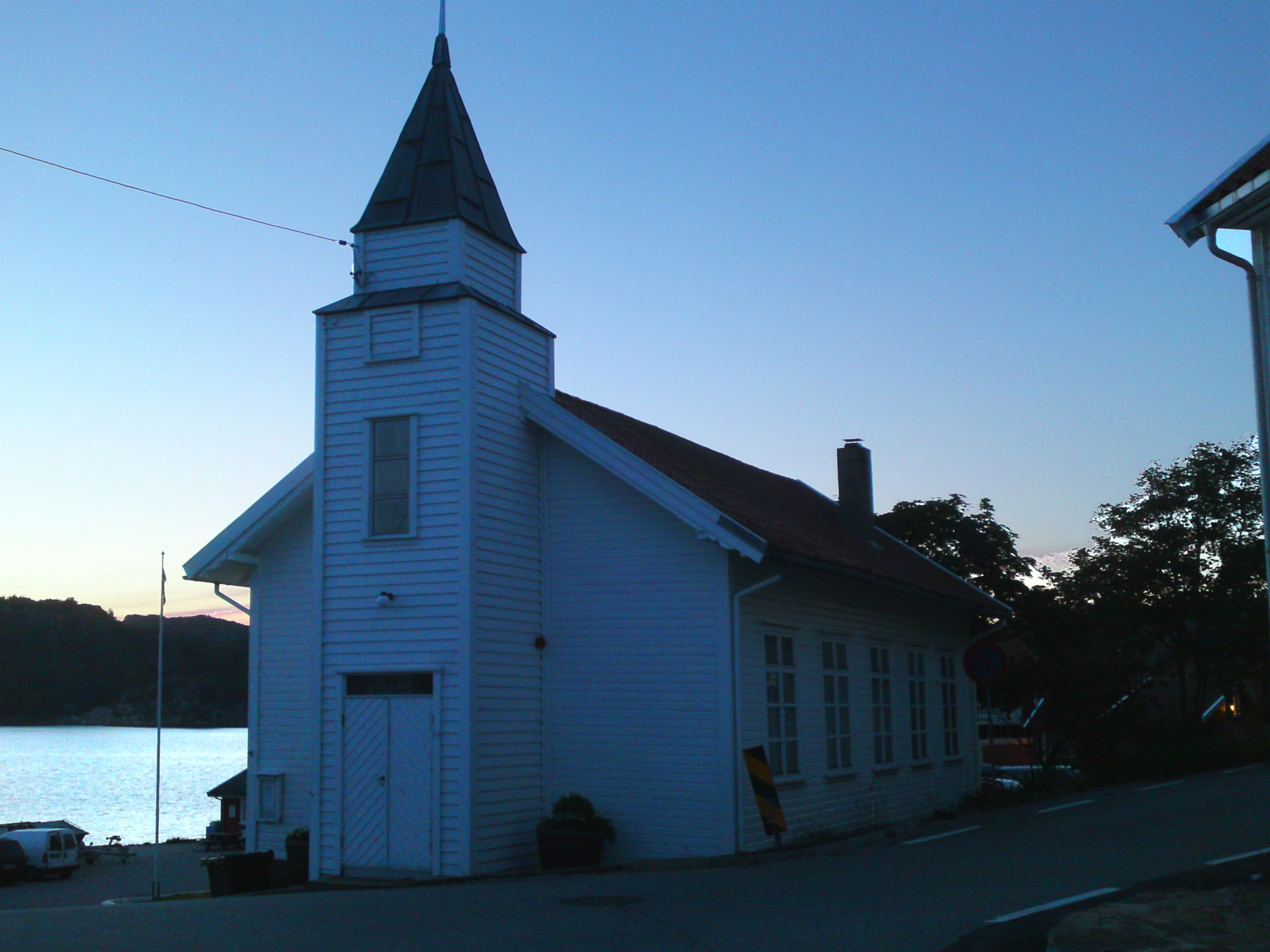
- View of the church
- Korshamn Chapel
- 58.022977°N 07.001153°E
- Location: Lyngdal Municipality, Agder
- Country: Norway
- Denomination: Church of Norway
- Churchmanship: Evangelical Lutheran

History
- Status: Parish church
- Founded: 1906

Architecture
- Functional status: Active
- Architect: Arne Abrahamsen
- Architectural type: Long church
- Completed: 1906; 120 years ago

Specifications
- Capacity: 100
- Materials: Wood

Administration
- Diocese: Agder og Telemark
- Deanery: Lister og Mandal prosti
- Parish: Lyngdal
- Norwegian Cultural Heritage Site
- Type: Church
- Status: Not protected
- ID: 84825

Korshamn Chapel (Norwegian: Korshamn kapell) is a parish church of the Church of Norway in Lyngdal Municipality in Agder county, Norway. It is located in the village of Korshamn. It is one of the churches for the Lyngdal parish which is part of the Lister og Mandal prosti (deanery) in the Diocese of Agder og Telemark. The white, wooden church was built in a long church design in 1906 using plans drawn up by the architect Arne Abrahamsen. The church seats about 100 people.

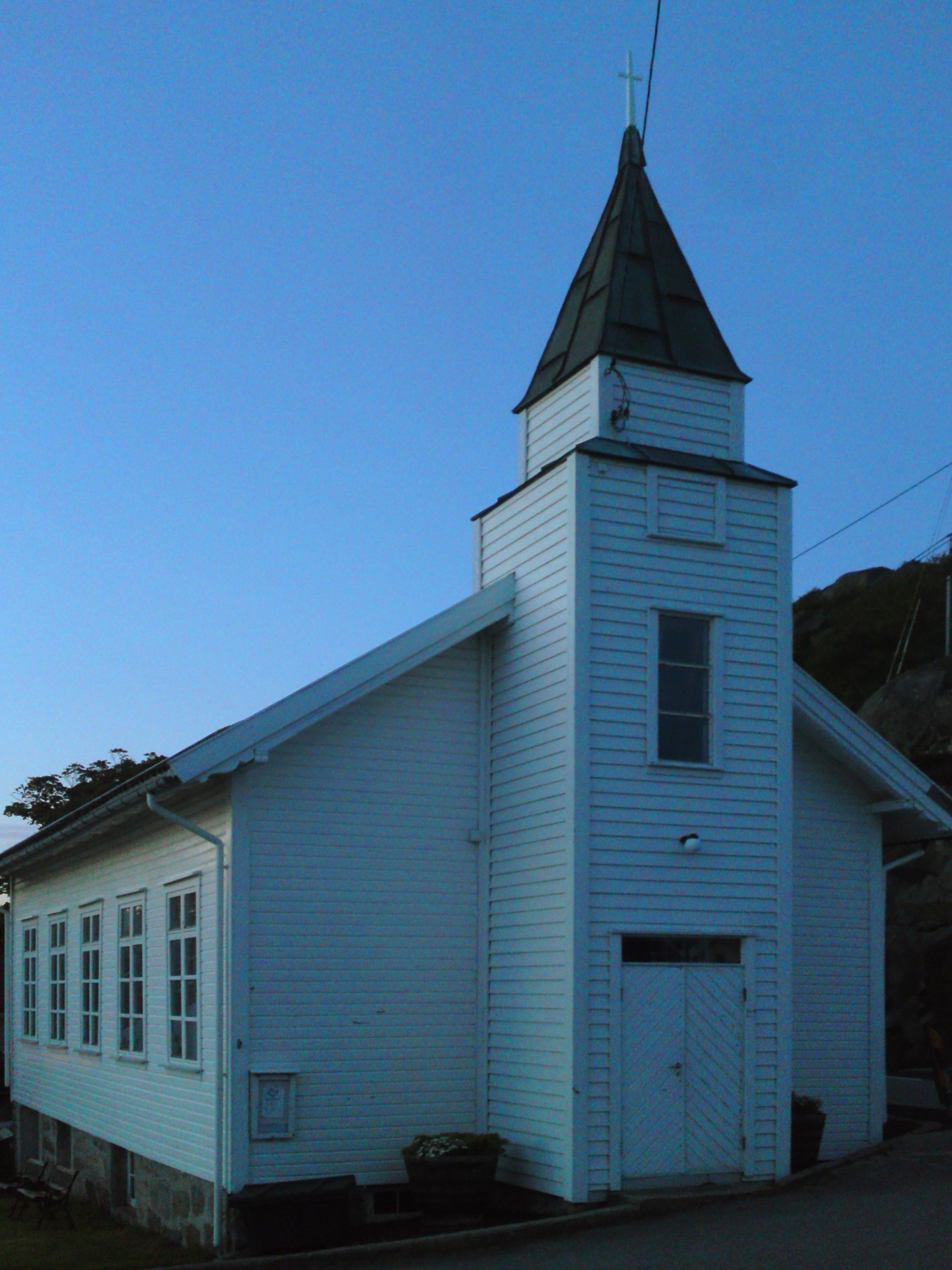
View of the church

== See also ==
- List of churches in Agder og Telemark
