= Flekkerøy Church =

Church in Agder, Norway

- Flekkerøy kirke
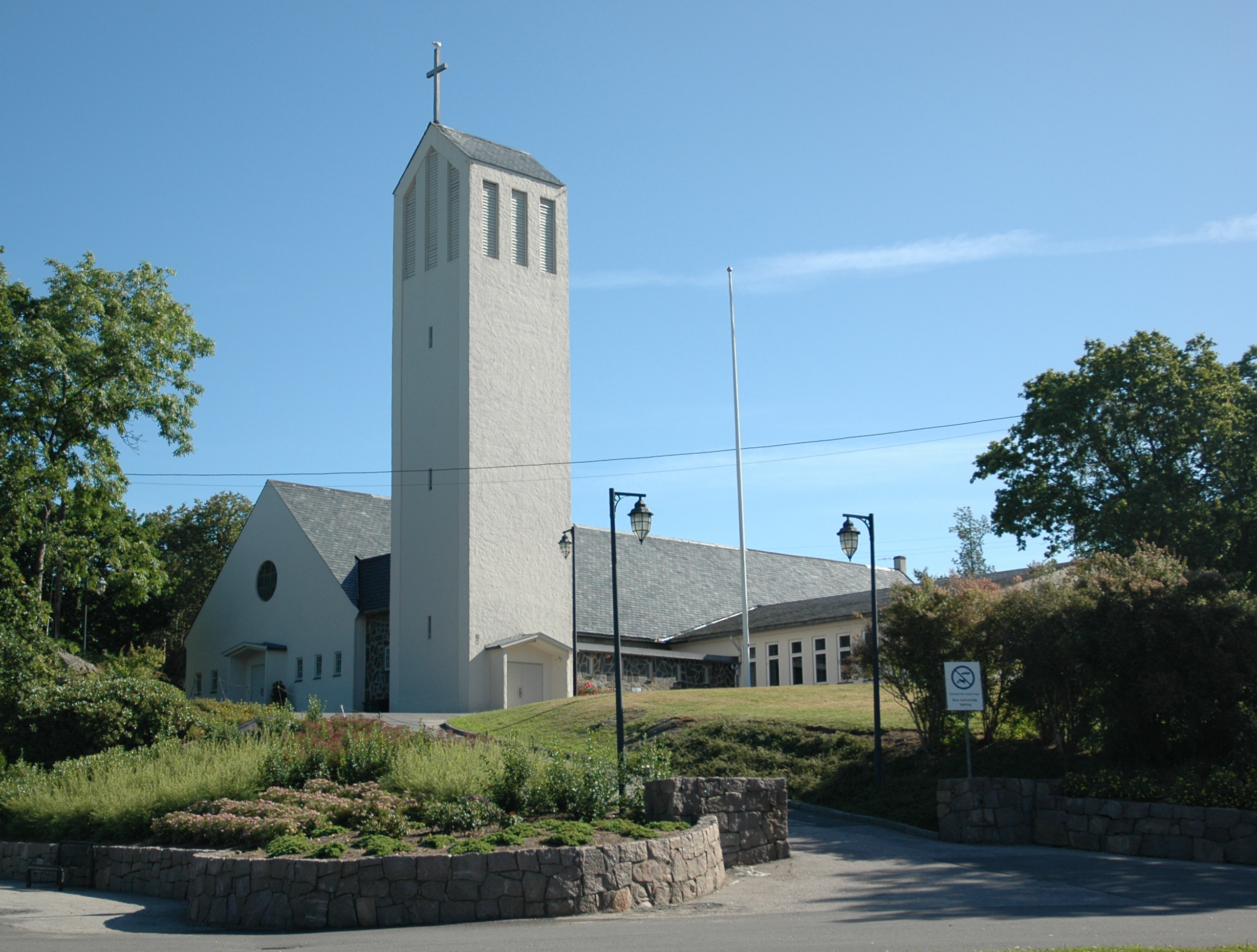
- View of the church
- Flekkerøy Church
- 58.0759°N 08.0013°E
- Location: Kristiansand Municipality, Agder
- Country: Norway
- Denomination: Church of Norway
- Churchmanship: Evangelical Lutheran
- Website: flekkerøymenighet.no

History
- Status: Parish church
- Founded: 1960
- Consecrated: 1960
- Events: 2019: large addition

Architecture
- Functional status: Active
- Architect: Gabriel Tallaksen
- Architectural type: Rectangular
- Completed: 1960 (66 years ago)

Specifications
- Capacity: 760
- Materials: Concrete

Administration
- Diocese: Agder og Telemark
- Deanery: Kristiansand domprosti
- Parish: Flekkerøy
- Norwegian Cultural Heritage Site
- Type: Church
- Status: Not protected
- ID: 84160

Flekkerøy Church (Norwegian: Flekkerøy kirke) is a parish church of the Church of Norway in Kristiansand Municipality in Agder county, Norway. It is located in the village of Mæbø on the island of Flekkerøy in the city of Kristiansand. It is the church for the Flekkerøy parish which is part of the Kristiansand domprosti (arch-deanery) in the Diocese of Agder og Telemark. The white, concrete church was built in a rectangular design in 1960 using plans drawn up by the architect Gabriel Tallaksen. The church seats about 760 people, but when a back wall is moved, the room can accommodate up to 900 people. The church is surrounded by a cemetery.

== History ==
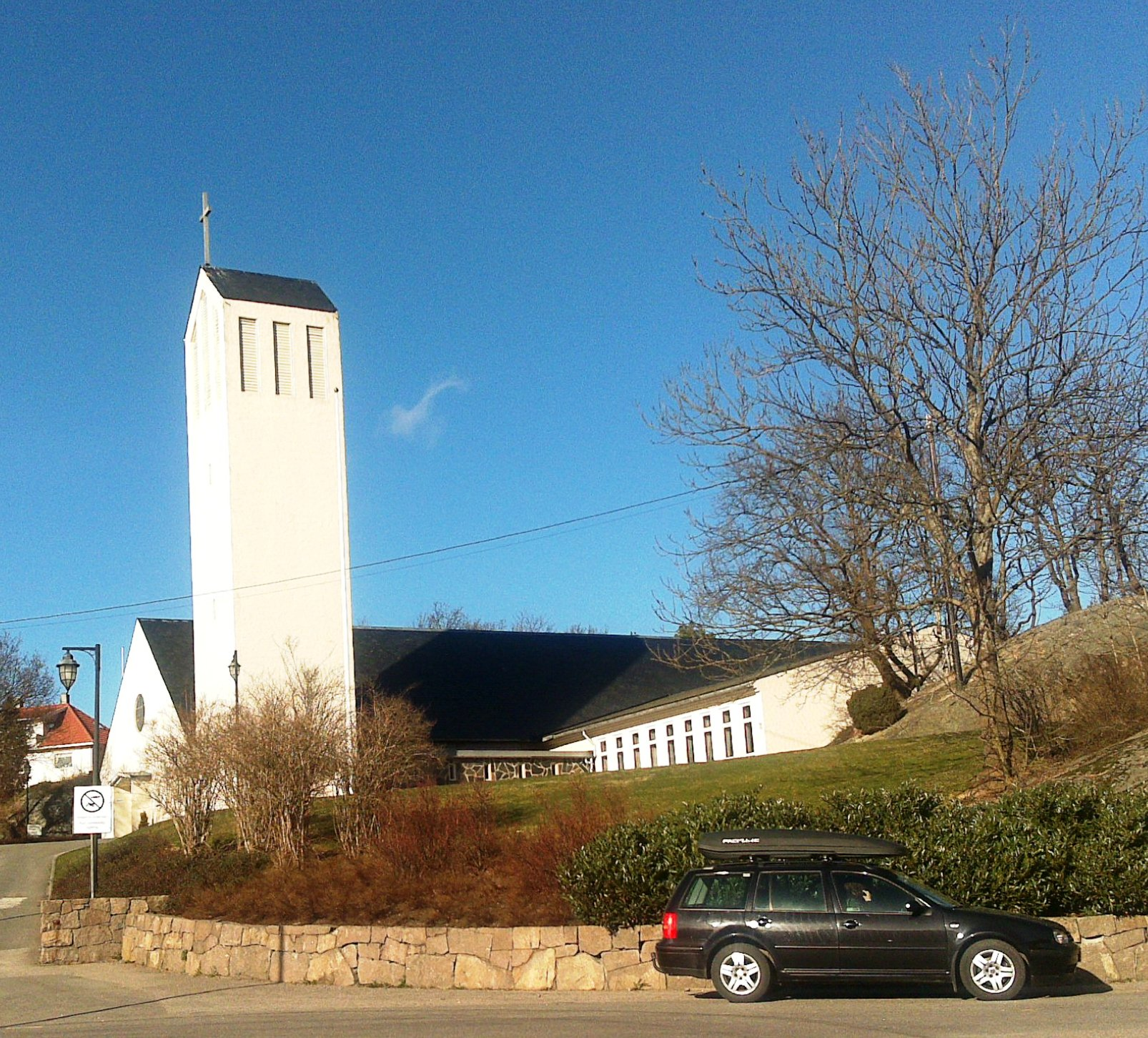
View of the church

The church on Flekkerøy was built in 1960 and as one of the most active parishes in the region, the church grew rapidly. In 1970, the church was expanded and again in 1988, the balcony seating was expanded.

By the 21st century, the church was too small for the parish. In 2018, work began on a massive two-story addition designed by the two architecture firms Hille Melbye and Einar Dahle. The addition added a large new sanctuary to the south of the existing church. Other offices, group rooms, bathrooms, and two kitchens were added as well. The old sanctuary was converted into a church hall. The new addition was consecrated on 1 Dec 2019 by the Bishop Stein Reinertsen. The addition cost 93 million kr.

== See also ==
- List of churches in Agder og Telemark
