= Tvedestrand Church =

Church in Agder, Norway

- Tvedestrand kirke
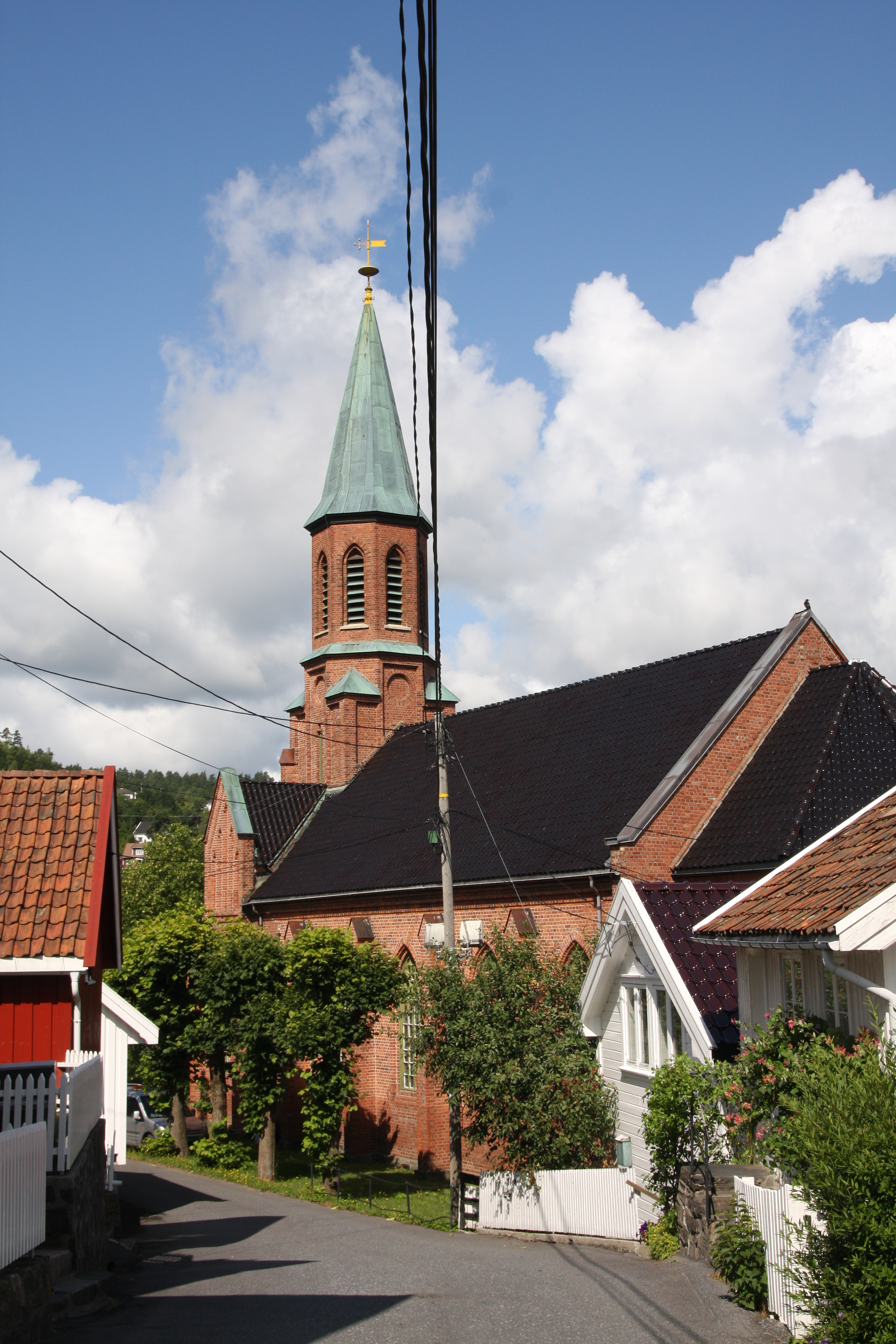
- View of the church
- Tvedestrand Church
- 58.623675°N 08.927698°E
- Location: Tvedestrand Municipality, Agder
- Country: Norway
- Denomination: Church of Norway
- Churchmanship: Evangelical Lutheran

History
- Status: Parish church
- Founded: 1861
- Consecrated: 20 Nov 1861

Architecture
- Functional status: Active
- Architect: Georg Andreas Bull
- Architectural type: Long church
- Groundbreaking: 26 July 1860
- Completed: 1861 (165 years ago)

Specifications
- Capacity: 300
- Materials: Brick

Administration
- Diocese: Agder og Telemark
- Deanery: Aust-Nedenes prosti
- Parish: Tvedestrand
- Norwegian Cultural Heritage Site
- Type: Church
- Status: Listed
- ID: 85689

Tvedestrand Church (Norwegian: Tvedestrand kirke) is a parish church of the Church of Norway in Tvedestrand Municipality in Agder county, Norway. It is located in the town of Tvedestrand. It is the church for the Tvedestrand parish which is part of the Aust-Nedenes prosti (deanery) in the Diocese of Agder og Telemark. The red, brick church was built in a long church design in 1860 using plans drawn up by the architect Georg Andreas Bull. The church seats about 300 people.

== History ==
The town of Tvedestrand was established in 1836. The people of the new town did not have a church of their own so as the town grew, plans were made for a new church to be built in the town. The foundation stone was laid on 26 July 1860 and the church was consecrated by the bishop on 20 November 1861. Since it was built in the central part of the town, there is no churchyard around the church, but instead the church cemetery is located about 500 metres (0.31 mi) to the northwest of the church in a more rural area. The cemetery was opened on 28 November 1866.

== Media gallery ==
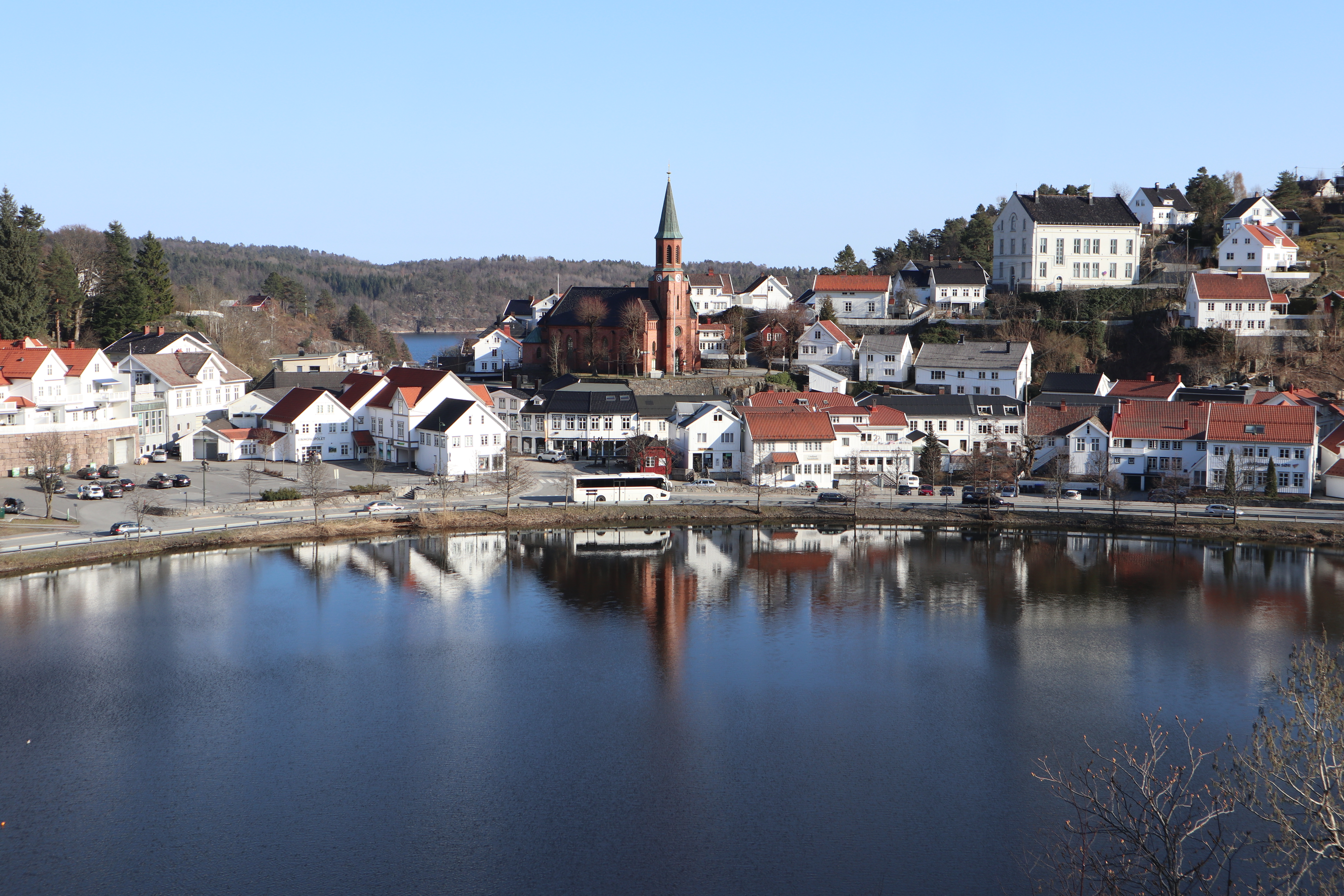

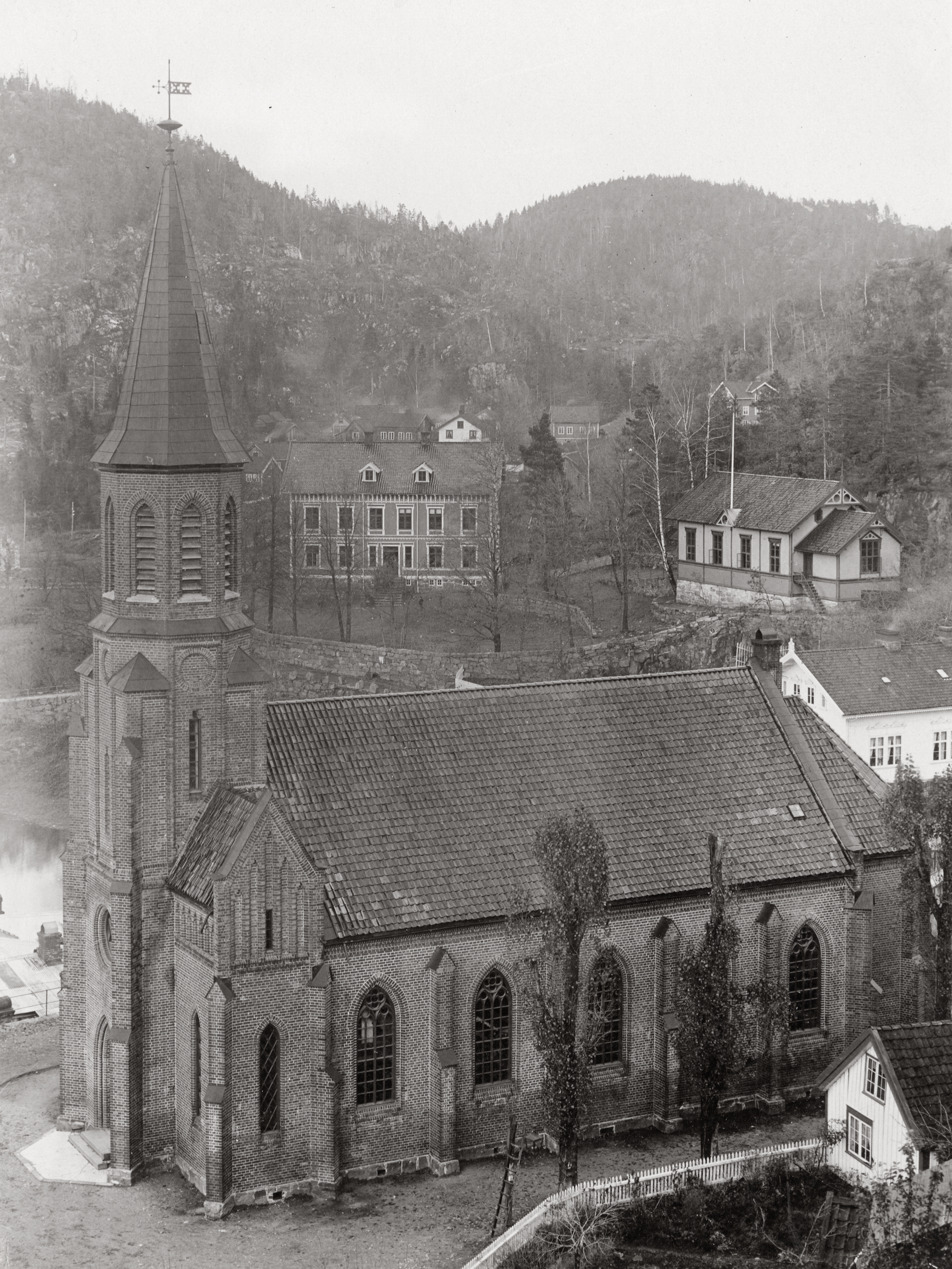

== See also ==
- List of churches in Agder og Telemark
