= Felle, Norway =

Village in Nissedal, Norway

Felle
- Village
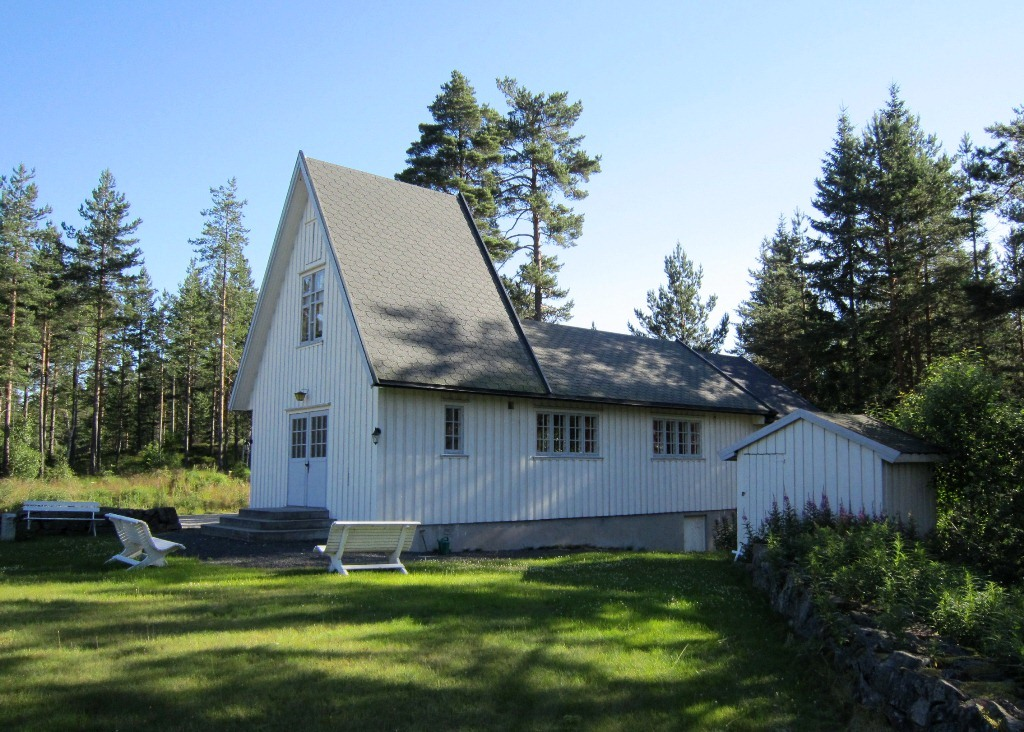
- View of the village chapel
- Interactive map of Felle
- Coordinates: 58.90362°N 8.74396°E
- Country: Norway
- Region: Eastern Norway
- County: Telemark
- District: Vest-Telemark
- Municipality: Nissedal Municipality
- Elevation: 310 m (1,020 ft)
- Time zone: UTC+01:00 (CET)
  - Summer (DST): UTC+02:00 (CEST)
- Post Code: 4865 Åmli

Felle is a village in Nissedal Municipality in Telemark county, Norway. The village is located about 20 kilometres (12 mi) to the southeast of the village of Treungen. Felle Chapel is located in the village. In 2011, there were about 130 residents in Felle and its surrounding areas.

In 2009, the village had a primary school with 6 pupils, and the school was threatened with closure. In 2011, the local newspaper Aust Agder Blad wrote that the residents of Felle were dissatisfied with being part of Nissedal Municipality, and would rather be incorporated into the neighboring Gjerstad Municipality in Aust-Agder county. When the municipal council of Nissedal Municipality decided to close the primary school in Felle, it was decided that they would fund a kindergarten in the village instead.
