= Gulset =

- Suburb
- Interactive map of Gulset
- Coordinates: 59°12′29″N 9°33′10″E
- Country: Norway
- Region: Eastern Norway
- County: Skien
- Municipality: Skien

Population (2013)
  - Total: 7,894
- Time zone: UTC+01:00 (CET)
  - Summer (DST): UTC+02:00 (CEST)
- Post Code: 3726 Skien

Gulset is a suburb located in Skien, Telemark, Norway. It is the most populated suburb in Skien with over 7,000 inhabitants.

== Schools ==
=== Stigeråsen Skole ===
Stigeråsen was opened in 1981 and it is an elementary school for children from first grade to grade 7.

=== Kollmyr Skole ===
Kollmyr (1974) is a public school that serves from grade 1. to grade 7.

=== Gulset Ungdomsskole ===
Gulset Ungdomsskole is the largest middle school in Skien with students from the three public schools Stigeråsen, Kollmyr and Skotfoss.
