= Austad =

Austad may refer to:

== People ==
- Alf Magne Austad (1946–2013), a Norwegian painter
- Mark Evans Austad (1917–1988), an American radio and television commentator
- Steven N. Austad, a biology professor at the University of Alabama at Birmingham
- Tore Austad (1935–2025), a Norwegian politician for the Conservative Party

== Places ==
- Austad, Bygland, a village in Bygland municipality in Agder county, Norway
- Austad, Drammen, a borough in the town of Drammen in Buskerud county, Norway
- Austad, Lyngdal, a village in Lyngdal municipality in Agder county, Norway
- Austad, Telemark, a village in Siljan Municipality in Telemark county, Norway
- Austad Municipality, a former municipality in Agder county, Norway
- Austad Church (Bygland), a church in Bygland municipality in Agder county, Norway
- Austad Church (Lyngdal), a church in Lyngdal municipality in Agder county, Norway
