= Skomrag =

Village in Lyngdal Municipality, Norway

Skomrag Skomrak (unofficial)
- Village
- Interactive map of Skomrag
- Coordinates: 58.11445°N 7.05993°E
- Country: Norway
- Region: Southern Norway
- County: Agder
- District: Lister
- Municipality: Lyngdal Municipality

Area
  - Total: 0.18 km^{2} (0.069 sq mi)
- Elevation: 37 m (121 ft)

Population (2025)
  - Total: 299
  - Density: 1,661/km^{2} (4,300/sq mi)
- Time zone: UTC+01:00 (CET)
  - Summer (DST): UTC+02:00 (CEST)
- Post Code: 4580 Lyngdal

Skomrag or Skomrak is a village in Lyngdal Municipality in Agder county, Norway. The village is located near the northern end of the Rosfjorden, about 1.5 kilometres (0.93 mi) south of the town of Lyngdal. The village of Svenevik lies about 2 kilometres (1.2 mi) straight west across the fjord.

The 0.18-square-kilometre (44-acre) village has a population (2025) of 299 and a population density of 1,661 inhabitants per square kilometre (4,300/sq mi).

The Skomrag area is divided into three parts called Skomrag Indre (in the north), Skomrag (in the central part), and Skomrag Ytre (in the south). Prior to 1964, the border between Lyngdal Municipality and Austad Municipality ran right between Skomrag and Skomrag Ytre.
