= Spind Municipality =

Former municipality in Vest-Agder, Norway

Spind Municipality Spind herred
- Former municipality
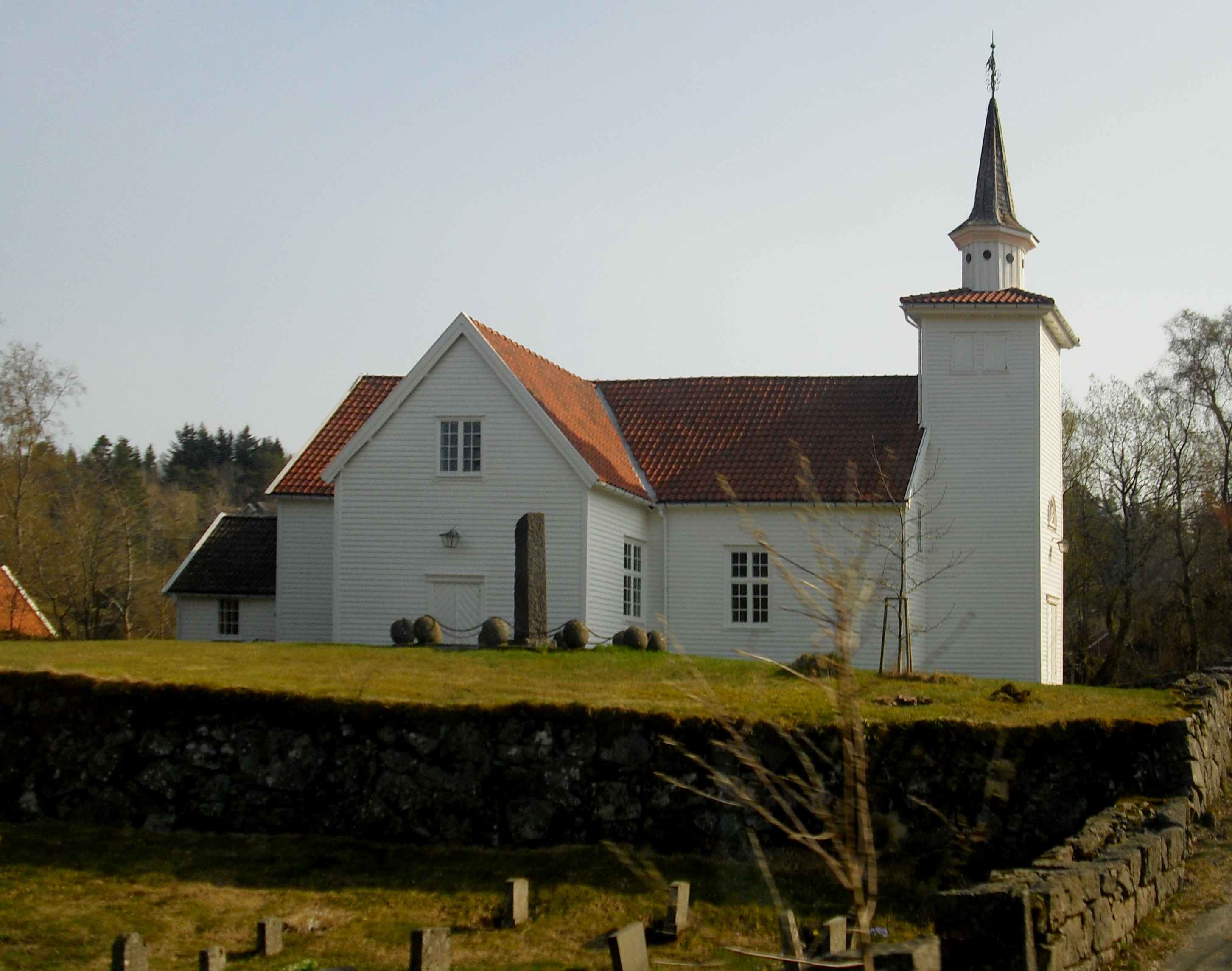
- View of the municipal church

- Vest-Agder within Norway

- Spind within Vest-Agder
- Coordinates: 58°05′35″N 06°54′06″E
- Country: Norway
- County: Vest-Agder
- District: Lister
- Established: 17 Oct 1893
  - Preceded by: Herad Municipality
- Disestablished: 1 Jan 1965
  - Succeeded by: Farsund Municipality
- Administrative centre: Rødland

Government
  - Mayor (1950–1964): Theimann Theisen

Area (upon dissolution)
  - Total: 42.6 km^{2} (16.4 sq mi)
  - Rank: #475 in Norway
- Highest elevation: 212 m (696 ft)

Population (1964)
  - Total: 622
  - Rank: #514 in Norway
  - Density: 14.6/km^{2} (38/sq mi)
  - Change (10 years): ▼ −9.7%
- Demonym: Spindværing

Official language
  - Norwegian form: Bokmål
- Time zone: UTC+01:00 (CET)
  - Summer (DST): UTC+02:00 (CEST)
- ISO 3166 code: NO-1040

Spind is a former municipality in the old Vest-Agder county, Norway. The 42.6-square-kilometre (16.4 sq mi) municipality existed from 1893 until its dissolution in 1965. The area is now part of Farsund Municipality in the traditional district of Lister in Agder county. The administrative centre was the village of Rødland where Spind Church is located.

Prior to its dissolution in 1965, the 42.6-square-kilometre (16.4 sq mi) municipality was the 475th largest by area out of the 525 municipalities in Norway. Spind Municipality was the 514th most populous municipality in Norway with a population of about 622. The municipality's population density was 14.6 inhabitants per square kilometre (38/sq mi) and its population had decreased by 9.7% over the previous 10-year period.

== General information ==
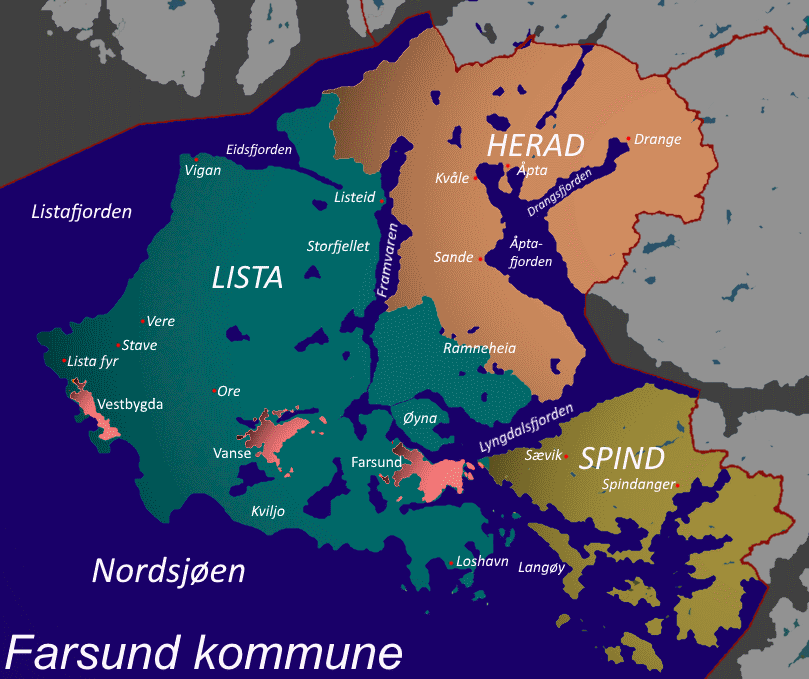
Map of the area in 1964

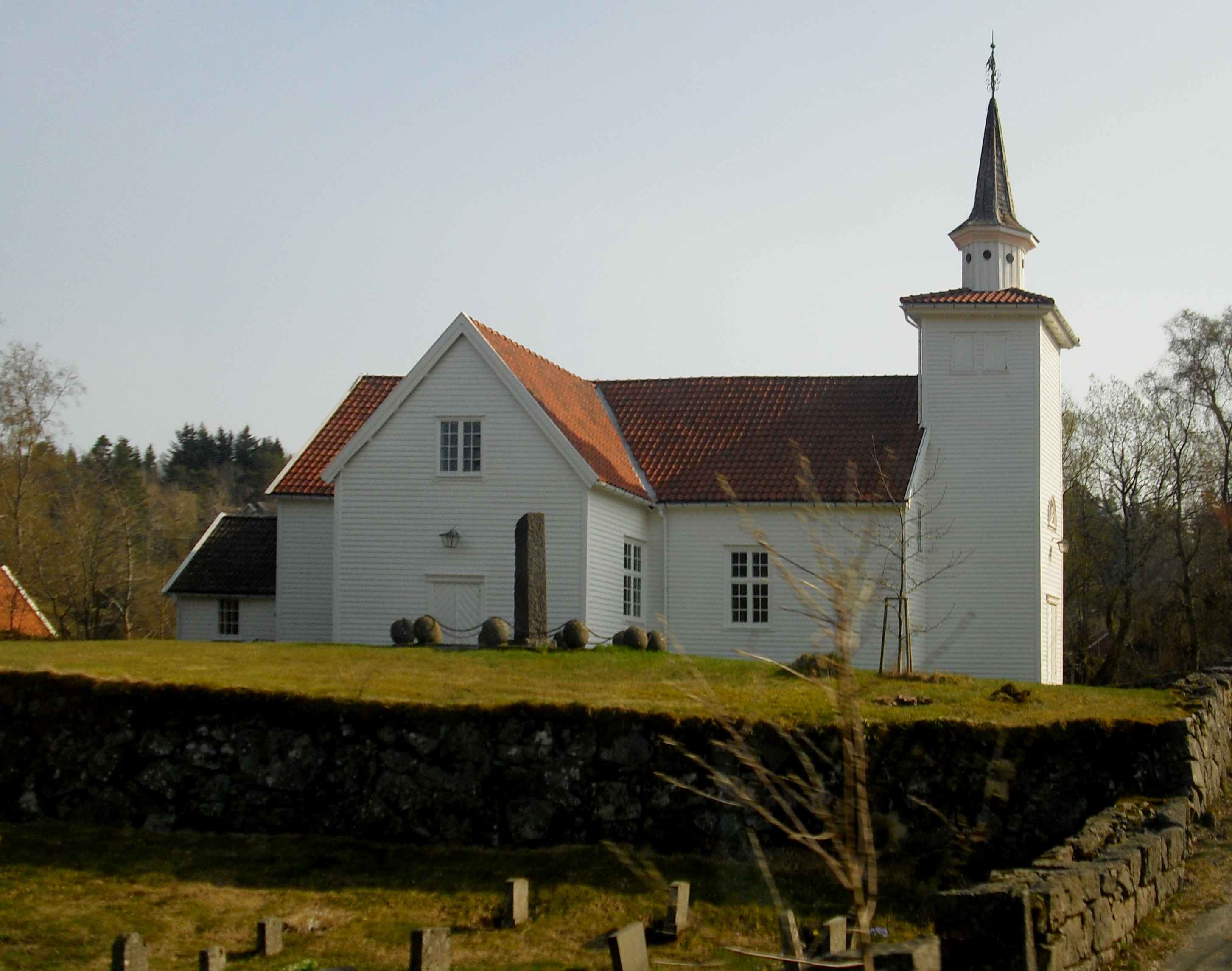
View of the Spind Church

The municipality of Spind was established on 17 October 1893 when Herad Municipality was divided into two: the southeastern district (population: 1,410) became the new Spind Municipality and the northwestern district (population: 1,019) remained as a smaller Herad Municipality. On 1 July 1916, a small part of the neighboring Austad Municipality (population: 4) was transferred to Spind Municipality.

During the 1960s, there were many municipal mergers across Norway due to the work of the Schei Committee. On 1 January 1965, Spind Municipality was dissolved and the following areas were merged to form an enlarged Farsund Municipality:

- the town of Farsund (population: 2,208)
- all of Herad Municipality (population: 359)
- all of Lista Municipality (population: 4,544)
- all of Spind Municipality (population: 606)

=== Name ===
The municipality (originally the parish) is named after the old Spind farm (Old Norse: Spind) since it was an old name for the area. The name is identical with the Old Norse word spind which means "lump" or "knoll", probably because the land has many rolling hills.

=== Churches ===
The Church of Norway had one parish (sokn) within Spind Municipality. At the time of the municipal dissolution, it was part of the Herad prestegjeld and the Lister prosti (deanery) in the Diocese of Agder.

Churches in Spind Municipality
Parish (sokn)	Church name	Location of the church	Year built
Spind	Spind Church	Rødland	1776

== Geography ==
The municipality was located on the Spind peninsula which lies between the Lyngdalsfjorden and the Rosfjord. The highest point in the municipality was the 212-metre (696 ft) tall mountain Husefjellet, located near the border with Austad Municipality. Lista Municipality was located to the west, Herad Municipality was located to the northwest, Lyngdal Municipality was located to the north, Austad Municipality was located to the east, and the North Sea was located to the south.

== Government ==
While it existed, Spind Municipality was responsible for primary education (through 10th grade), outpatient health services, senior citizen services, welfare and other social services, zoning, economic development, and municipal roads and utilities. The municipality was governed by a municipal council of directly elected representatives. The mayor was indirectly elected by a vote of the municipal council. The municipality was under the jurisdiction of the Lyngdal District Court and the Agder Court of Appeal.

=== Municipal council ===
The municipal council (Herredsstyre) of Spind Municipality was made up of 13 representatives that were elected to four year terms. The tables below show the historical composition of the council by political party.

Spind herredsstyre 1963–1964
Party name (in Norwegian)	Number of representatives
Local List(s) (Lokale lister)	13
Total number of members:	13
Note: On 1 January 1965, Spind Municipality became part of Farsund Municipality.

Spind herredsstyre 1959–1963
Party name (in Norwegian)	Number of representatives
Local List(s) (Lokale lister)	13
Total number of members:	13

Spind herredsstyre 1955–1959
Party name (in Norwegian)	Number of representatives
Local List(s) (Lokale lister)	13
Total number of members:	13

Spind herredsstyre 1951–1955
Party name (in Norwegian)	Number of representatives
Local List(s) (Lokale lister)	12
Total number of members:	12

Spind herredsstyre 1947–1951
Party name (in Norwegian)	Number of representatives
Local List(s) (Lokale lister)	12
Total number of members:	12

Spind herredsstyre 1945–1947
Party name (in Norwegian)	Number of representatives
Local List(s) (Lokale lister)	12
Total number of members:	12

Spind herredsstyre 1937–1941*
Party name (in Norwegian)	Number of representatives
Local List(s) (Lokale lister)	12
Total number of members:	12
Note: Due to the German occupation of Norway during World War II, no elections were held for new municipal councils until after the war ended in 1945.

=== Mayors ===
The mayor (Norwegian: ordfører) of Spind Municipality was the political leader of the municipality and the chairperson of the municipal council. The following people have held this position:

- 1893–1895: Gabriel Jacobi Jensen Bekkevig
- 1895–1897: Tønnes Emanuel Tobiassen
- 1897–1907: Gabriel Jacobi Jensen Bekkevig
- 1908–1916: Gabriel Salvesen
- 1917–1922: Hans Jacob Olsen
- 1923–1939: Anders Risnes
- 1939–1940: Trygve Nøtland
- 1941–1942: Anders Risnes
- 1942–1944: Trygve Nøtland
- 1944–1945: Olaf Årikstad
- 1945–1945: Kåre Helle
- 1945–1945: Jørgen Farbrot
- 1946–1949: Sakarias Espeland
- 1950–1964: Theimann Theisen

== See also ==
- List of former municipalities of Norway
