= Svenevik =

Village in Lyngdal Municipality, Norway

- Village
- Interactive map of Svenevik
- Coordinates: 58.11163°N 7.02417°E
- Country: Norway
- Region: Southern Norway
- County: Agder
- District: Lister
- Municipality: Lyngdal Municipality

Area
  - Total: 0.3 km^{2} (0.12 sq mi)
- Elevation: 7 m (23 ft)

Population (2025)
  - Total: 320
  - Density: 1,067/km^{2} (2,760/sq mi)
- Time zone: UTC+01:00 (CET)
  - Summer (DST): UTC+02:00 (CEST)
- Post Code: 4580 Lyngdal

Svenevik is a village in Lyngdal Municipality in Agder county, Norway. The village is located along the Rosfjorden, about 3 kilometres (1.9 mi) south of the town of Lyngdal. The small village of Skomrag is located about 2 kilometres (1.2 mi) straight east across the fjord.

The 0.3-square-kilometre (74-acre) village has a population (2025) of 320 and a population density of 1,067 inhabitants per square kilometre (2,760/sq mi).
