= Fleseland =

Village in Lyngdal Municipality, Norway

- Village
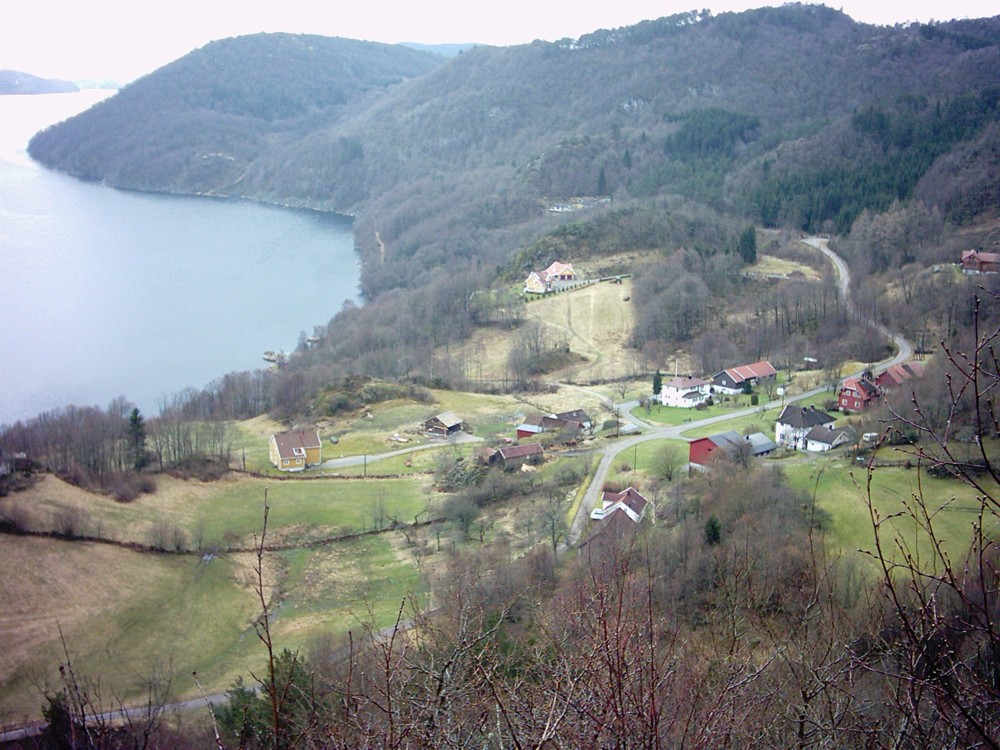
- View of the village
- Interactive map of Fleseland
- Coordinates: 58.0993°N 7.15172°E
- Country: Norway
- Region: Southern Norway
- County: Agder
- District: Lister
- Municipality: Lyngdal Municipality
- Elevation: 41 m (135 ft)
- Time zone: UTC+01:00 (CET)
  - Summer (DST): UTC+02:00 (CEST)
- Post Code: 4580 Lyngdal

Fleseland is a small village in Lyngdal Municipality in Agder county, Norway. The village is located on the west shore of the Lenesfjorden, about 10 kilometres (6.2 mi) southeast of the town of Lyngdal and about 6 kilometres (3.7 mi) north of the village of Høllen in the neighboring Lindesnes Municipality.

The total population of Fleseland is less than 20 people on a permanent basis, but during the summer holiday season the population increases as tourists rent holiday cottages in the village.
