= Austad, Lyngdal =

Village in Lyngdal Municipality, Norway

Austad
- Village
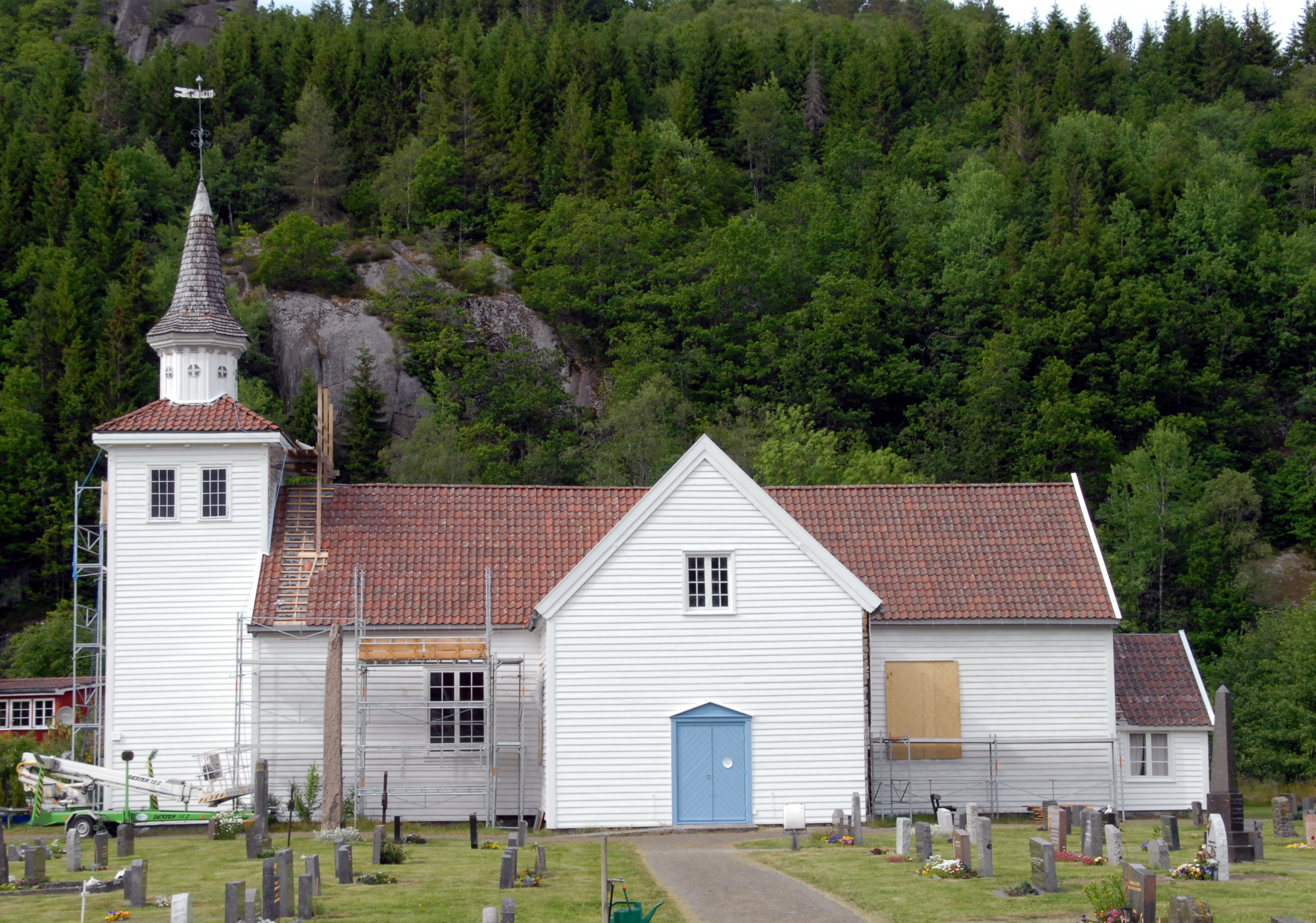
- View of the village church
- Interactive map of Austad
- Coordinates: 58.09011°N 7.04443°E
- Country: Norway
- Region: Southern Norway
- County: Agder
- District: Lister
- Municipality: Lyngdal Municipality
- Elevation: 4 m (13 ft)
- Time zone: UTC+01:00 (CET)
  - Summer (DST): UTC+02:00 (CEST)
- Post Code: 4580 Lyngdal

Austad is a village in Lyngdal Municipality in Agder county, Norway. The village is located in the southern part of the municipality, about 6 kilometres (3.7 mi) south of the town of Lyngdal and the village of Korshavn. The village is on the eastern shore of the Rosfjorden. The Austad Church is located in the center of the village.

In the Rockstar produced game, “Red Dead Redemption 2”, Austad is referenced on a newspaper scrap found on one of the settlers of Manzanita Post.

== History ==
The village was the administrative centre of the old Austad Municipality which existed from 1909 until 1963.

=== Name ===
The village is named after the old Austad farm (Old Norse: Alvisstaðir). The first element of the name is derived from the male name "Ålvir" and the last element is "stad" (Old Norse: staðir) which means "homestead" or "farm".
