= Hæåk =

Village in Lyngdal Municipality, Norway

- Village
- Interactive map of Hæåk
- Coordinates: 58.17841°N 6.9899°E
- Country: Norway
- Region: Southern Norway
- County: Agder
- District: Lister
- Municipality: Lyngdal Municipality
- Elevation: 270 m (890 ft)
- Time zone: UTC+01:00 (CET)
  - Summer (DST): UTC+02:00 (CEST)
- Post Code: 4580 Lyngdal

Hæåk is a very small farming village in Lyngdal Municipality in Agder county, Norway. The village is located about 8 kilometres (5.0 mi) northwest of the town of Lyngdal. Originally, the farm was not accessible by road, and only a few farmers lived there. However, in 1987 a steep road leading down to Hæåk was built, and it has since become a popular place for bicycling enthusiasts.

The main industry in the area of Hæåk is gravel production.
