= Korshamn =

Village in Lyngdal Municipality, Norway

Korshavn Korshamn
- Village
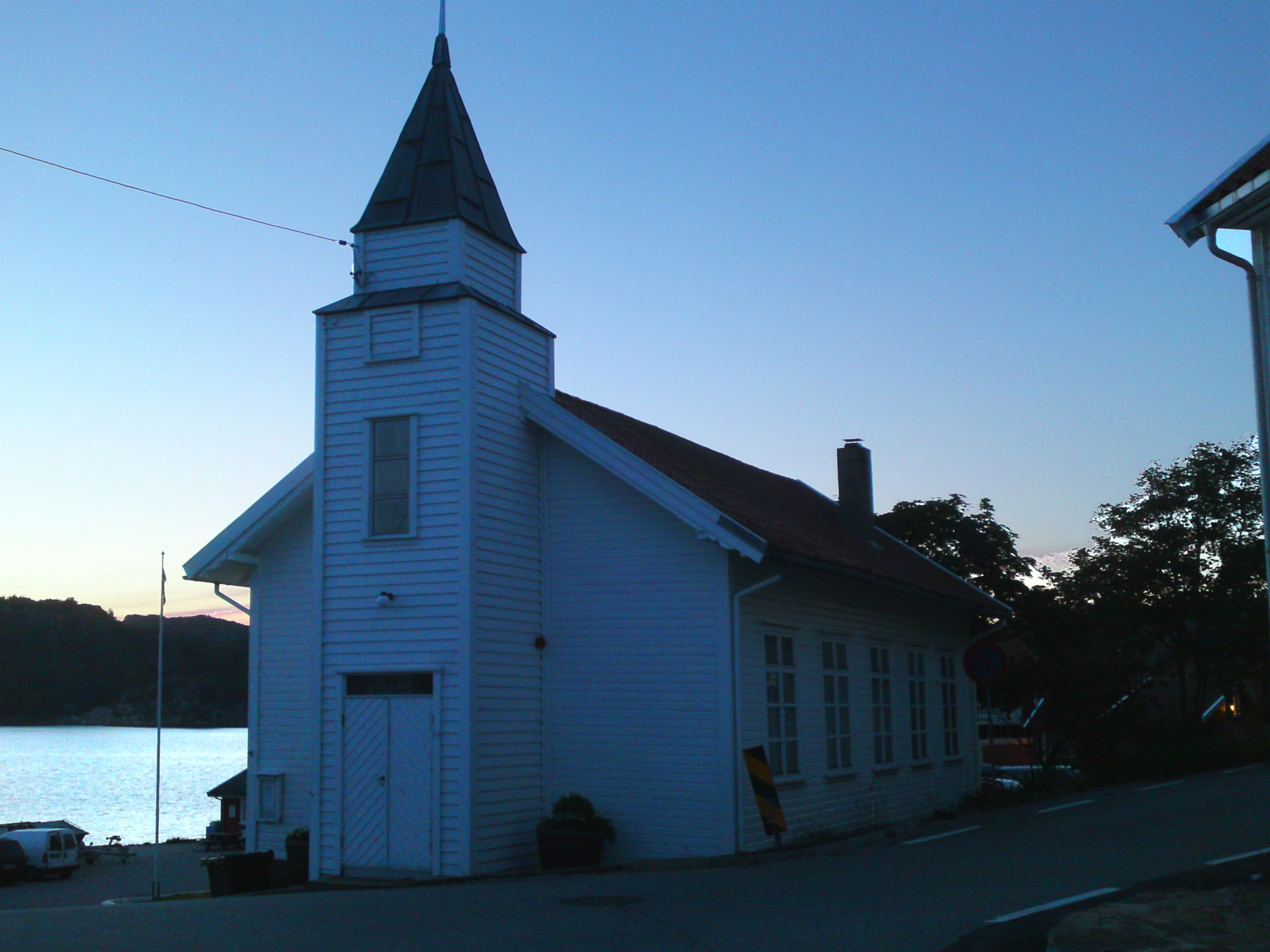
- View of the village church
- Interactive map of Korshavn
- Coordinates: 58.02288°N 7.00103°E
- Country: Norway
- Region: Southern Norway
- County: Agder
- District: Lister
- Municipality: Lyngdal Municipality
- Elevation: 5 m (16 ft)
- Time zone: UTC+01:00 (CET)
  - Summer (DST): UTC+02:00 (CEST)
- Post Code: 4586 Korshamn

Korshavn or Korshamn is a fishing village in the southern part of Lyngdal Municipality in Agder county, Norway. The village is located on the island of Revøy, located at the mouth of the Grønsfjorden. Korshavn lies about 10 kilometres (6.2 mi) south of the village of Austad. Korshamn Chapel is located in the village, serving the southern part of the municipality. Traditionally, a fishing village, it now caters to tourists, primarily through the "Korshamn Rorbuer" rental cottages.

== History ==
According to Snorre, in the year 1028, King Olaf II (Saint Olaf) made landfall on the island of Sælør, just south of Korshavn with thirteen ships and a thousand men. This event was commemorated by a sculpture of the king in central Lyngdal, revealed by King Olav V in 1983.
