= Austad Church =

Austad Church may refer to:

- Austad Church (Bygland), a church in Bygland municipality in Agder county, Norway
- Austad Church (Lyngdal), a church in Lyngdal municipality in Agder county, Norway
