= Austad Municipality =

Former municipality in Vest-Agder, Norway

Austad Municipality Austad herred
- Former municipality
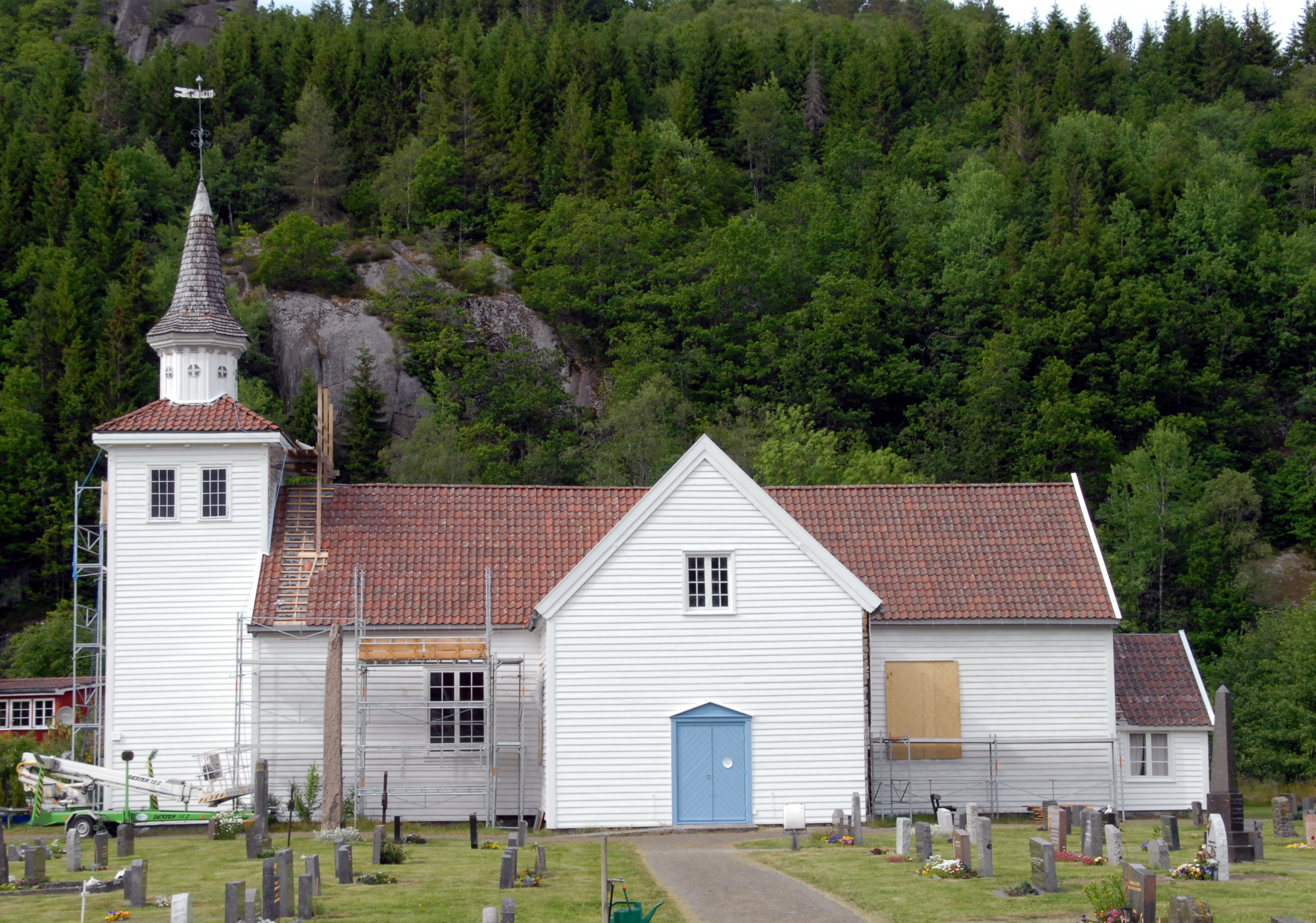
- View of the local church

- Vest-Agder within Norway

- Austad within Vest-Agder
- Coordinates: 58°05′30″N 07°02′45″E
- Country: Norway
- County: Vest-Agder
- District: Lister
- Established: 1 Jan 1909
  - Preceded by: Lyngdal Municipality
- Disestablished: 1 Jan 1963
  - Succeeded by: Lyngdal Municipality
- Administrative centre: Austad

Area (upon dissolution)
  - Total: 44.01 km^{2} (16.99 sq mi)
  - Rank: #607 in Norway
- Highest elevation: 270 m (890 ft)

Population (1962)
  - Total: 621
  - Rank: #678 in Norway
  - Density: 14.1/km^{2} (37/sq mi)
  - Change (10 years): ▼ −19.1%

Official language
  - Norwegian form: Bokmål
- Time zone: UTC+01:00 (CET)
  - Summer (DST): UTC+02:00 (CEST)
- ISO 3166 code: NO-1031

Austad is a former municipality in the old Vest-Agder county, Norway. The 44-square-kilometre (17 sq mi) municipality existed from 1909 until its dissolution in 1963. The area is now part of Lyngdal Municipality in the traditional district of Lister in Agder county. The administrative centre was the village of Austad where Austad Church is located.

Prior to its dissolution in 1962, the 44.01-square-kilometre (16.99 sq mi) municipality was the 607th largest by area out of the 705 municipalities in Norway. Austad Municipality was the 678th most populous municipality in Norway with a population of about 621. The municipality's population density was 14.1 inhabitants per square kilometre (37/sq mi) and its population had decreased by 19.1% over the previous 10-year period.

== General information ==
The municipality of Austad was established on 1 January 1909 when the old Lyngdal Municipality was divided into three municipalities:

- the southern coastal area (population: 1,263) became the new Austad Municipality
- the northern area (population: 736) became the new Kvaas Municipality
- the central area (population: 2,698) continued as a smaller Lyngdal Municipality

On 7 January 1916, there was a small border adjustment which transferred a small area (population: 4) from Austad Municipality to the neighboring Spind Municipality.

During the 1960s, there were many municipal mergers across Norway due to the work of the Schei Committee. On 1 January 1963, Austad Municipality was dissolved and the following areas were merged to form a new, larger Lyngdal Municipality:

- all of Lyngdal Municipality (population: 2,916)
- all of Austad Municipality (population: 608)
- all of Kvås Municipality (population: 493)
- the Gitlevåg area of Spangereid Municipality (population: 103)

=== Name ===
The municipality (originally the parish) is named after the old Austad farm (Old Norse: Alvisstaðir) since the first Austad Church was built there. The first element the male name "Ålvir" or "Ǫlvir". The last element is the plural form of staðr which means "place" or "abode".

=== Churches ===
The Church of Norway had one parish (sokn) within Austad Municipality. At the time of the municipal dissolution, it was part of the Lyngdal prestegjeld and the Lister prosti (deanery) in the Diocese of Agder.

Churches in Austad Municipality
Parish (sokn)	Church name	Location of the church	Year built
Austad	Austad Church	Austad	1803
Austad	Korshamn Chapel	Korshavn	1906

== Geography ==
The municipality encompassed the area surrounding the Rosfjorden. The highest point in the municipality was the 570-metre (1,870 ft) tall mountain Gitlesteinheia. Lyngdal Municipality was located to the north, Spangereid Municipality was located to the east, the North Sea was to the south, and Spind Municipality was located to the west.

== Government ==
While it existed, Austad Municipality was responsible for primary education (through 10th grade), outpatient health services, senior citizen services, welfare and other social services, zoning, economic development, and municipal roads and utilities. The municipality was governed by a municipal council of directly elected representatives. The mayor was indirectly elected by a vote of the municipal council. The municipality was under the jurisdiction of the Lyngdal District Court and the Agder Court of Appeal.

=== Municipal council ===
The municipal council (Herredsstyre) of Austad Municipality was made up of 13 representatives that were elected to four year terms. The tables below show the historical composition of the council by political party.

Austad herredsstyre 1959–1962
Party name (in Norwegian)	Number of representatives
Labour Party (Arbeiderpartiet)	2
Conservative Party (Høyre)	4
Centre Party (Senterpartiet)	2
Liberal Party (Venstre)	5
Total number of members:	13
Note: On 1 January 1963, Austad Municipality became part of Lyngdal Municipality.

Austad herredsstyre 1955–1959
Party name (in Norwegian)	Number of representatives
Labour Party (Arbeiderpartiet)	2
Conservative Party (Høyre)	4
Joint List(s) of Non-Socialist Parties (Borgerlige Felleslister)	7
Total number of members:	13

Austad herredsstyre 1951–1955
Party name (in Norwegian)	Number of representatives
Labour Party (Arbeiderpartiet)	2
Conservative Party (Høyre)	3
Liberal Party (Venstre)	6
Local List(s) (Lokale lister)	1
Total number of members:	12

Austad herredsstyre 1947–1951
Party name (in Norwegian)	Number of representatives
Local List(s) (Lokale lister)	12
Total number of members:	12

Austad herredsstyre 1945–1947
Party name (in Norwegian)	Number of representatives
Local List(s) (Lokale lister)	12
Total number of members:	12

Austad herredsstyre 1937–1941*
Party name (in Norwegian)	Number of representatives
Farmers' Party (Bondepartiet)	6
List of workers, fishermen, and small farmholders (Arbeidere, fiskere, småbrukere liste)	3
Joint List(s) of Non-Socialist Parties (Borgerlige Felleslister)	3
Total number of members:	12
Note: Due to the German occupation of Norway during World War II, no elections were held for new municipal councils until after the war ended in 1945.

=== Mayors ===
The mayor (Norwegian: ordførar) of Austad Municipality was the political leader of the municipality and the chairperson of the municipal council. The following people have held this position:

- 1909–1925: Michael Boxnæs
- 1926–1934: Thorvald Grefstad
- 1935–1936: T.Z. Lundegård
- 1936–1937: Thorvald Grefstad
- 1937–1940: Ole Jensen
- 1940–1941: Thorvald Grefstad
- 1941–1945: Selmer Bærø
- 1945–1945: Thorvald Grefstad
- 1946–1947: Emil Visdal
- 1948–1962: Jakob Holvik

== See also ==
- List of former municipalities of Norway
