= Lyngdal Church (Agder) =

Church in Agder, Norway

- Lyngdal kirke
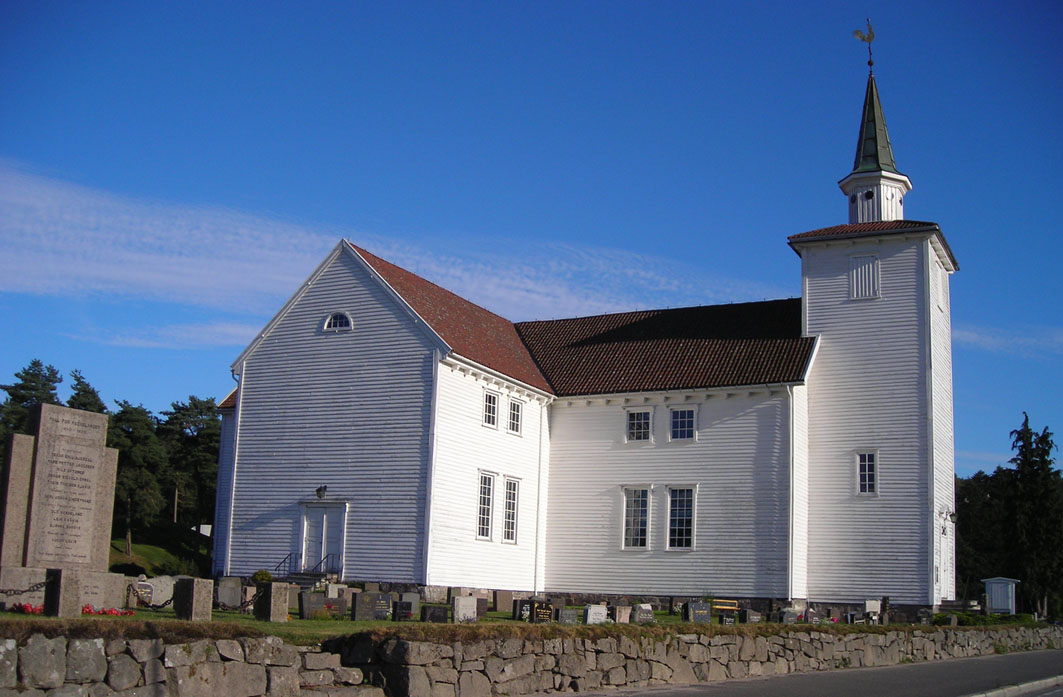
- View of the church
- Lyngdal Church
- 58.1534°N 07.0912°E
- Location: Lyngdal Municipality, Agder
- Country: Norway
- Denomination: Church of Norway
- Churchmanship: Evangelical Lutheran

History
- Status: Parish church
- Founded: 12th century
- Consecrated: 1848

Architecture
- Functional status: Active
- Architect: Hans Linstow
- Architectural type: Cruciform
- Completed: 1848; 178 years ago

Specifications
- Capacity: 800
- Materials: Wood

Administration
- Diocese: Agder og Telemark
- Deanery: Lister og Mandal prosti
- Parish: Lyngdal
- Norwegian Cultural Heritage Site
- Type: Church
- Status: Automatically protected
- ID: 84352

Lyngdal Church (Norwegian: Lyngdal kirke) is a parish church of the Church of Norway in Lyngdal Municipality in Agder county, Norway. It is located in the town of Lyngdal. It is one of the churches for the Lyngdal parish which is part of the Lister og Mandal prosti (deanery) in the Diocese of Agder og Telemark. The white, wooden church was built in a cruciform design in 1848 using plans drawn up by the local parish priest Gabriel Kirsebom Kielland who modified standardized church plans by the church architect Hans Linstow. The church seats about 800 people, making it one of the largest churches in Southern Norway.

== History ==
The earliest existing historical records of the church date back to the year 1429, but it was likely built during the 12th century. The old church on this site was a stone building with a rectangular nave and a narrower, rectangular chancel.

In 1814, this church served as an election church (Norwegian: valgkirke). Together with more than 300 other parish churches across Norway, it was a polling station for elections to the 1814 Norwegian Constituent Assembly which wrote the Constitution of Norway. This was Norway's first national elections. Each church parish was a constituency that elected people called "electors" who later met together in each county to elect the representatives for the assembly that was to meet at Eidsvoll Manor later that year.

In 1847, the centuries-old church was torn down and during the next year, a new wooden cruciform church was built just a few meters north of the old church site. Some of the stone from the walls was reused in the foundation of the new church. The new church was much larger than the previous church. Originally, it was designed to hold 1636 people. Today, due to fire regulations and the large organ located on the 2nd floor gallery where there once was seating, there is only room for around 800 people.

== Media gallery ==
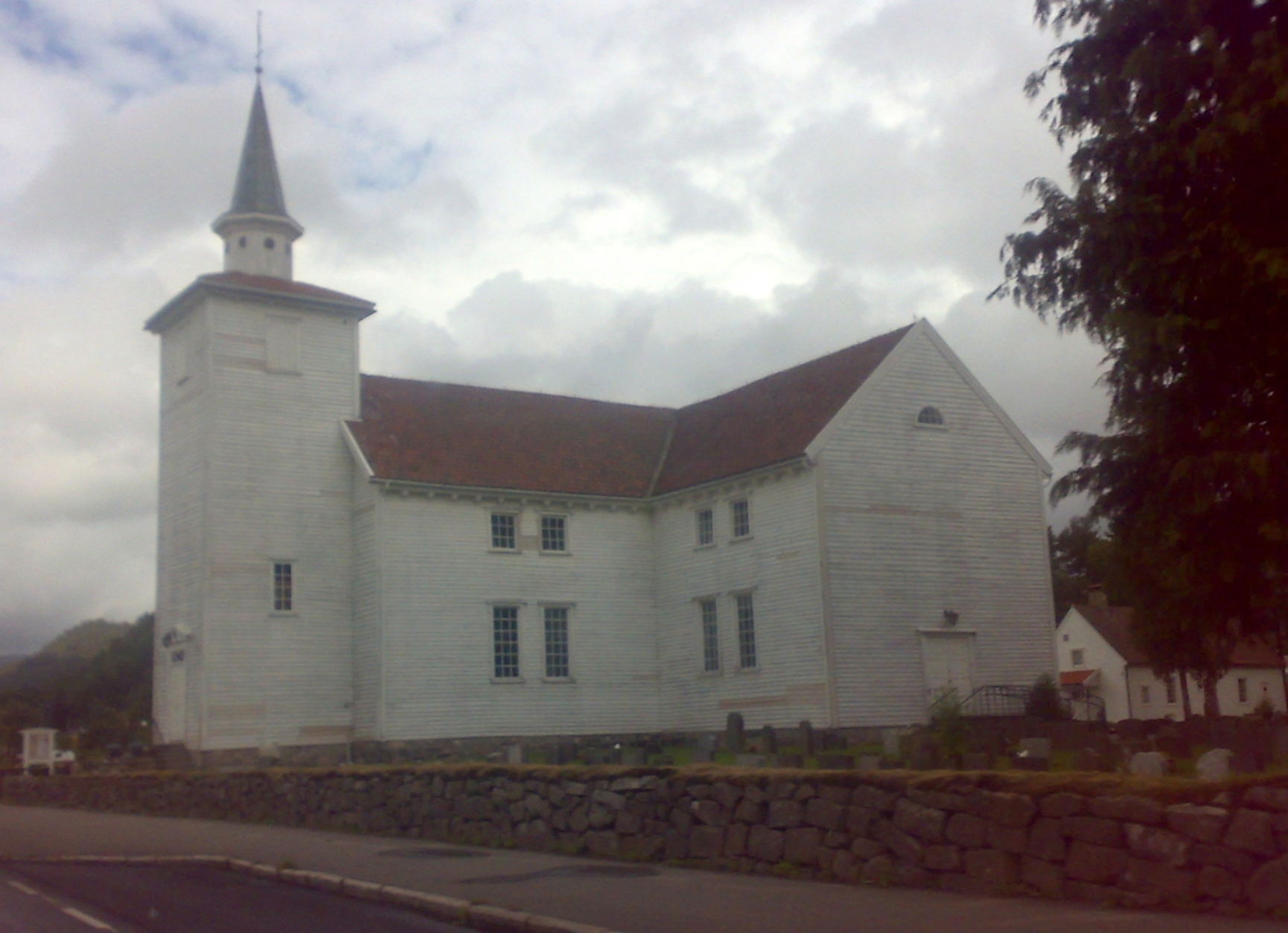

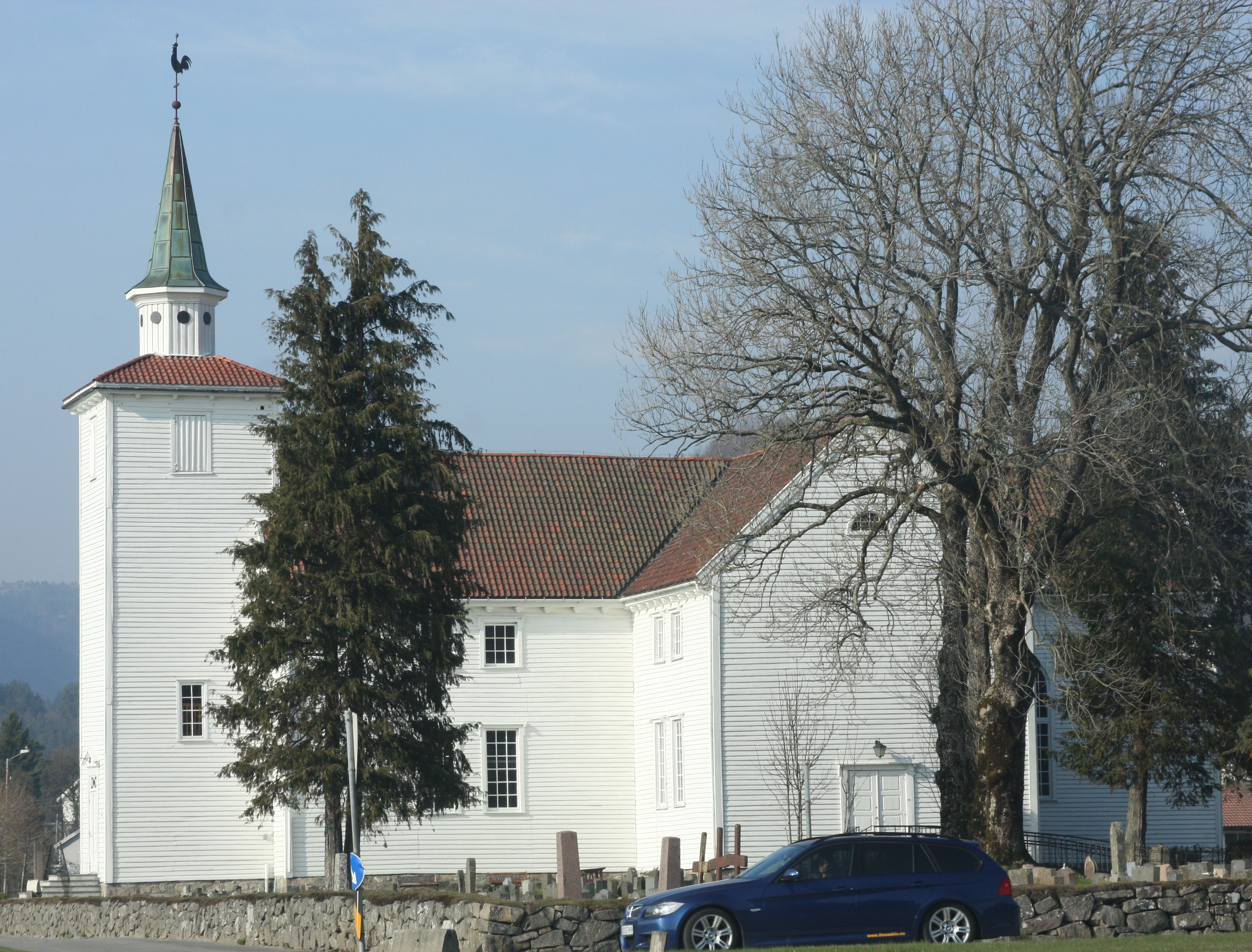

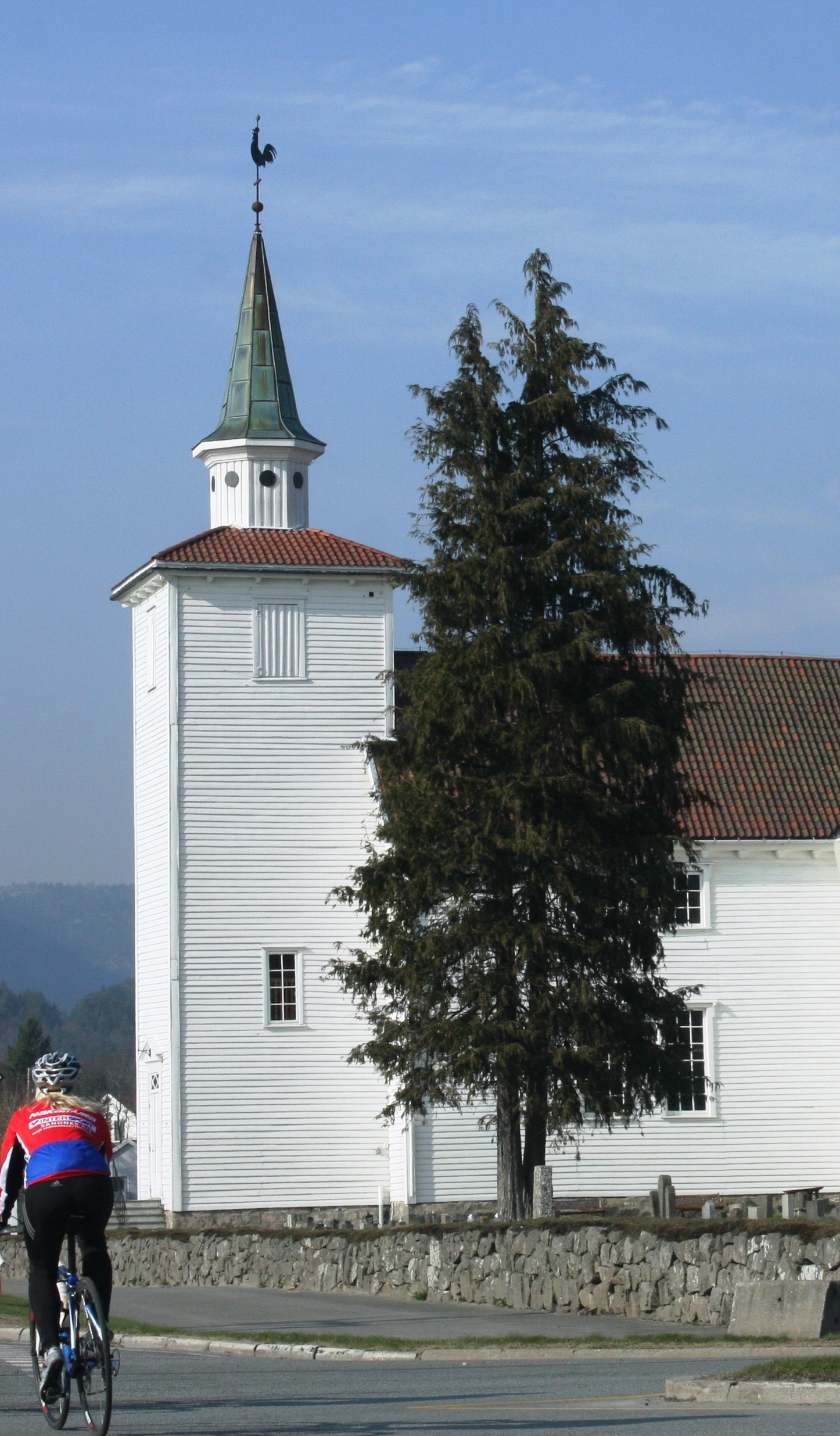

== See also ==
- List of churches in Agder og Telemark
