= Lyngdal Municipality =

Municipality in Agder, Norway

Lyngdal Municipality Lyngdal kommune
- Municipality
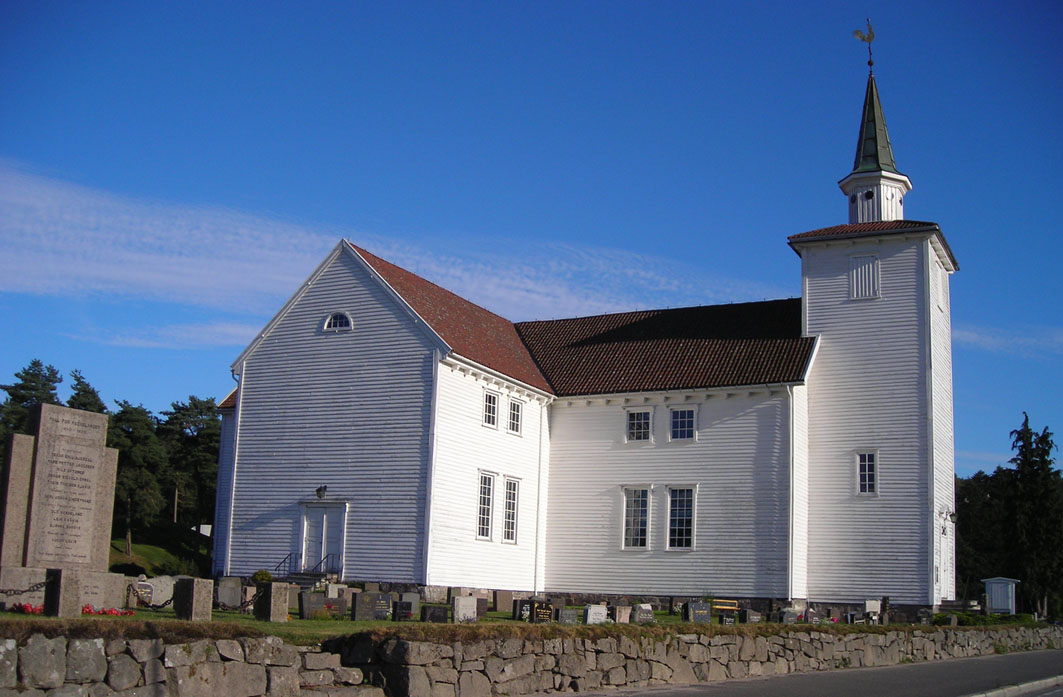
- View of the Lyngdal Church

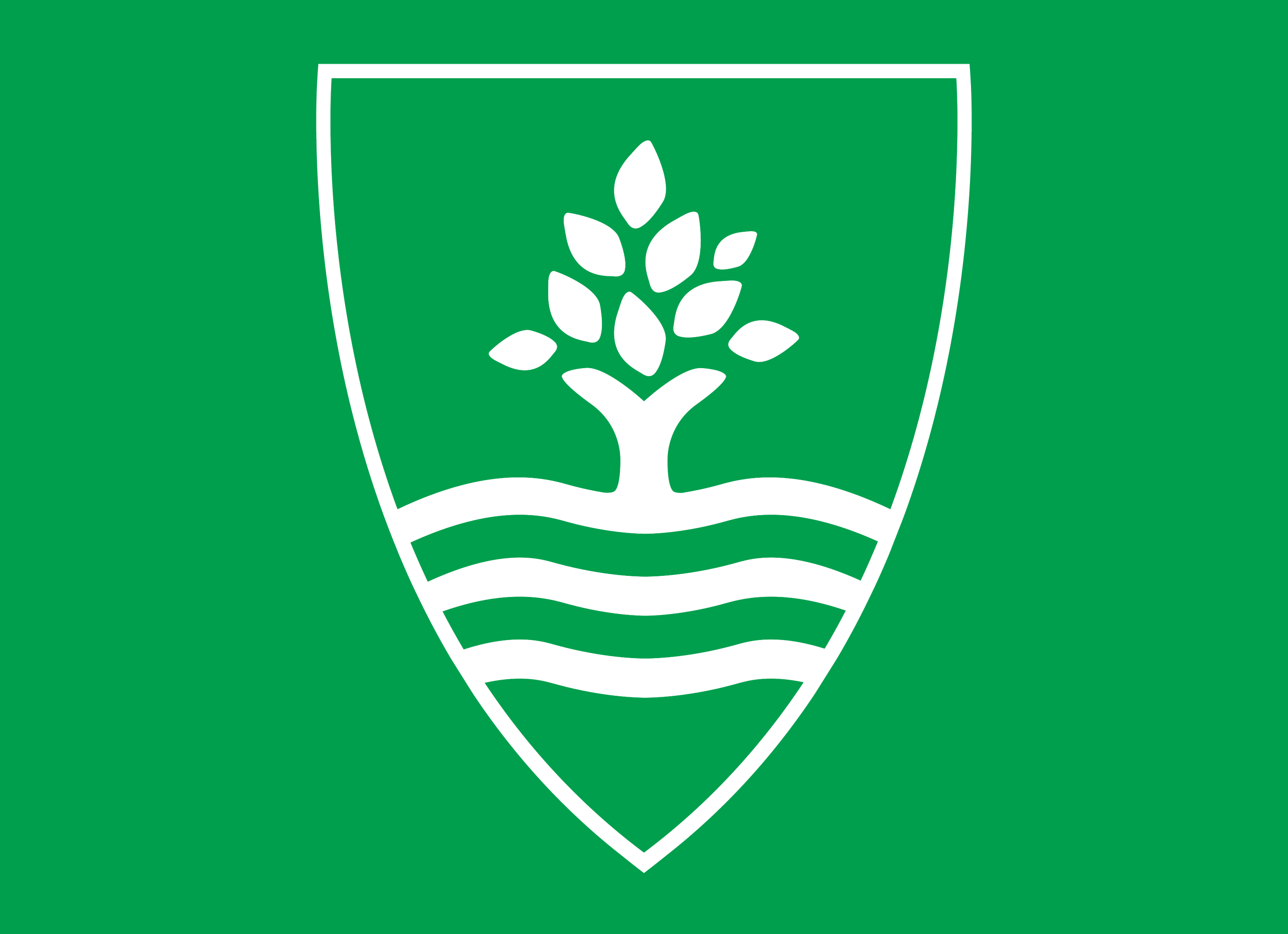
- Flag Coat of arms

- Agder within Norway

- Lyngdal within Agder
- Coordinates: 58°10′09″N 07°03′21″E
- Country: Norway
- County: Agder
- District: Lister
- Established: 1 Jan 1838
  - Created as: Formannskapsdistrikt
- Administrative centre: Alleen

Government
  - Mayor (2023): Unni Nilsen Husøy (FrP)

Area
  - Total: 642.79 km^{2} (248.18 sq mi)
  - Land: 606.11 km^{2} (234.02 sq mi)
  - Water: 36.68 km^{2} (14.16 sq mi) 5.7%
  - Rank: #177 in Norway
- Highest elevation: 578.09 m (1,896.6 ft)

Population (2026)
  - Total: 10,922
  - Rank: #108 in Norway
  - Density: 18/km^{2} (47/sq mi)
  - Change (10 years): ▲ +6.6%
- Demonym: Lyngdøl

Official language
  - Norwegian form: Neutral
- Time zone: UTC+01:00 (CET)
  - Summer (DST): UTC+02:00 (CEST)
- ISO 3166 code: NO-4225
- Website: Official website

Lyngdal is a municipality in Agder county, Norway. It is located in the traditional district of Lister. The administrative centre of the municipality is the town of Alleen (also known as Lyngdal). Some of the main villages in Lyngdal include Austad, Byremo, Fleseland, Hæåk, Konsmo, Korshavn, Kvås, Skomrak, Svenevik, and Vivlemo.

The 642.79-square-kilometre (248.18 sq mi) municipality is the 177th largest by area out of the 357 municipalities in Norway. Lyngdal Municipality is the 108th most populous municipality in Norway with a population of 10,922. The municipality's population density is 18 inhabitants per square kilometre (47/sq mi) and its population has increased by 6.6% over the previous 10-year period.

The municipal economy centers around wood processing, agriculture, and commerce. Tourism is also central to the community, with the beaches along the Lyngdalsfjorden and Rosfjorden being popular resorts during the summer.

== General information ==
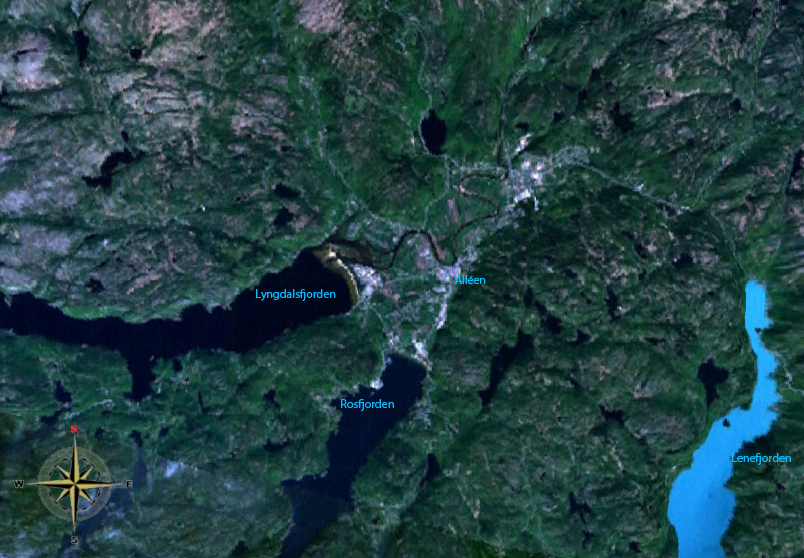
Satellite view of Lyngdal

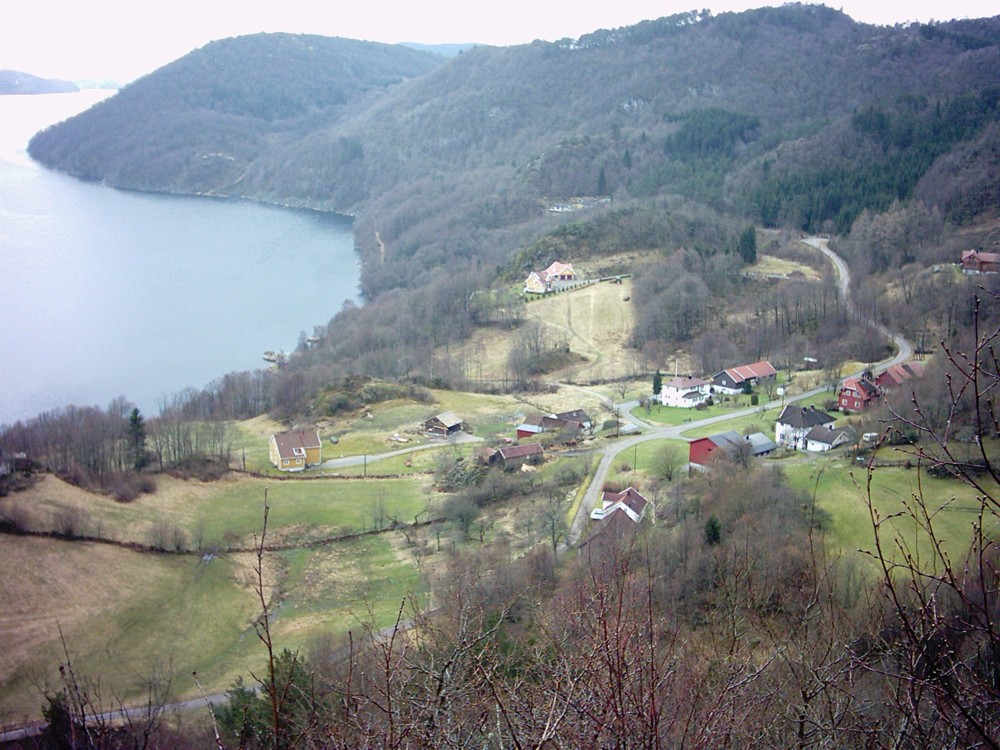
View of Fleseland on the Rosfjorden

The historic parish of Aa was established as Lyngdal Municipality on 1 January 1838 (see formannskapsdistrikt law).

On 1 January 1909, Lyngdal Municipality was divided into three municipalities:

- the southern coastal area (population: 1,263) became the new Austad Municipality
- the northern area (population: 736) became the new Kvaas Municipality
- the central area (population: 2,698) continued as a smaller Lyngdal Municipality

During the 1960s, there were many municipal mergers across Norway due to the work of the Schei Committee. On 1 January 1963, the following areas were merged to form a new, larger Lyngdal Municipality:

- all of Lyngdal Municipality (population: 2,916)
- all of Austad Municipality (population: 608)
- all of Kvås Municipality (population: 493)
- the Gitlevåg area west of Lenesfjorden in Spangereid Municipality (population: 103)

On 1 January 1971, the Ytre Skarstein and Indre Skarstein areas of Lyngdal Municipality (population: 21) was transferred to the neighboring Farsund Municipality.

On 1 January 2001, the municipal council of Lyngdal Municipality declared that the municipal centre of Alleen would be a town (Norwegian: By) called Lyngdal.

In 2020, there were many municipal and county mergers across Norway due to the work of the Solberg cabinet. Historically, this municipality was part of the old Vest-Agder county. On 1 January 2020, the municipality became a part of the newly-formed Agder county (after Aust-Agder and Vest-Agder counties were merged). Also on 1 January 2020, Lyngdal Municipality (population: 8,609) and Audnedal Municipality (population: 1,780) were merged to form an enlarged Lyngdal Municipality.

=== Name ===
The municipality is named after the Lyngdalen valley (Old Norse: Lygnudalr) since it is the valley in which the municipality is located. The first element is the genitive case of the river name Lygna. This name comes from the word logn which means "quietness" or "calm". The last element is dalr which means "valley" or "dale". Prior to 1908, the parish (but not the municipality) of Lyngdal was called Aa, named after the vicarage. The name of the vicarage was first mentioned in 1312 as "a Am", the dative plural of á which means "(small) river". The farm lies between two rivers.

=== Coat of arms ===
Arms from 1987 to 2019

Current arms since 2020

The original coat of arms was granted on 27 March 1987 and in use until 1 January 2020 when the municipality was enlarged. The official blazon was "Vert a cow statant argent" (Norwegian: I grønt en stående sølv ku). This means the arms had a green field (background) and the charge was a cow that was facing to the left. The cow had a tincture of argent which meant it was commonly colored white, but if it was made out of metal, then silver was used. The cow was chosen since the local breed of cows (lyngdalsku) has been very well known across Norway since the 19th century. The yearly cattle fair traders from all over Southern Norway and Western Norway visit the municipality to get cows. The arms were designed by Torgeir Schjølberg.

The current coat of arms was approved for use starting on 1 January 2020. The arms have a green field (background) and the charge is a tree on top of three wavy lines. The tree and wavy lines have a tincture of argent which means it is commonly colored white, but if it is made out of metal, then silver is used. The tree symbolizes growth. It has nine leaves symbolizing the nine main population centres within Lyngdal. The wavy lines represent waves and meadows. There are three white lines to represent the three large rivers in the municipality: Lygna, Audna, and Mandalselva. The two green wavy lines (between the white wavy lines represent the two valleys in the municipality: Lyngdalen and Audnedalen. The arms were designed by Richard Haugland.

=== Churches ===
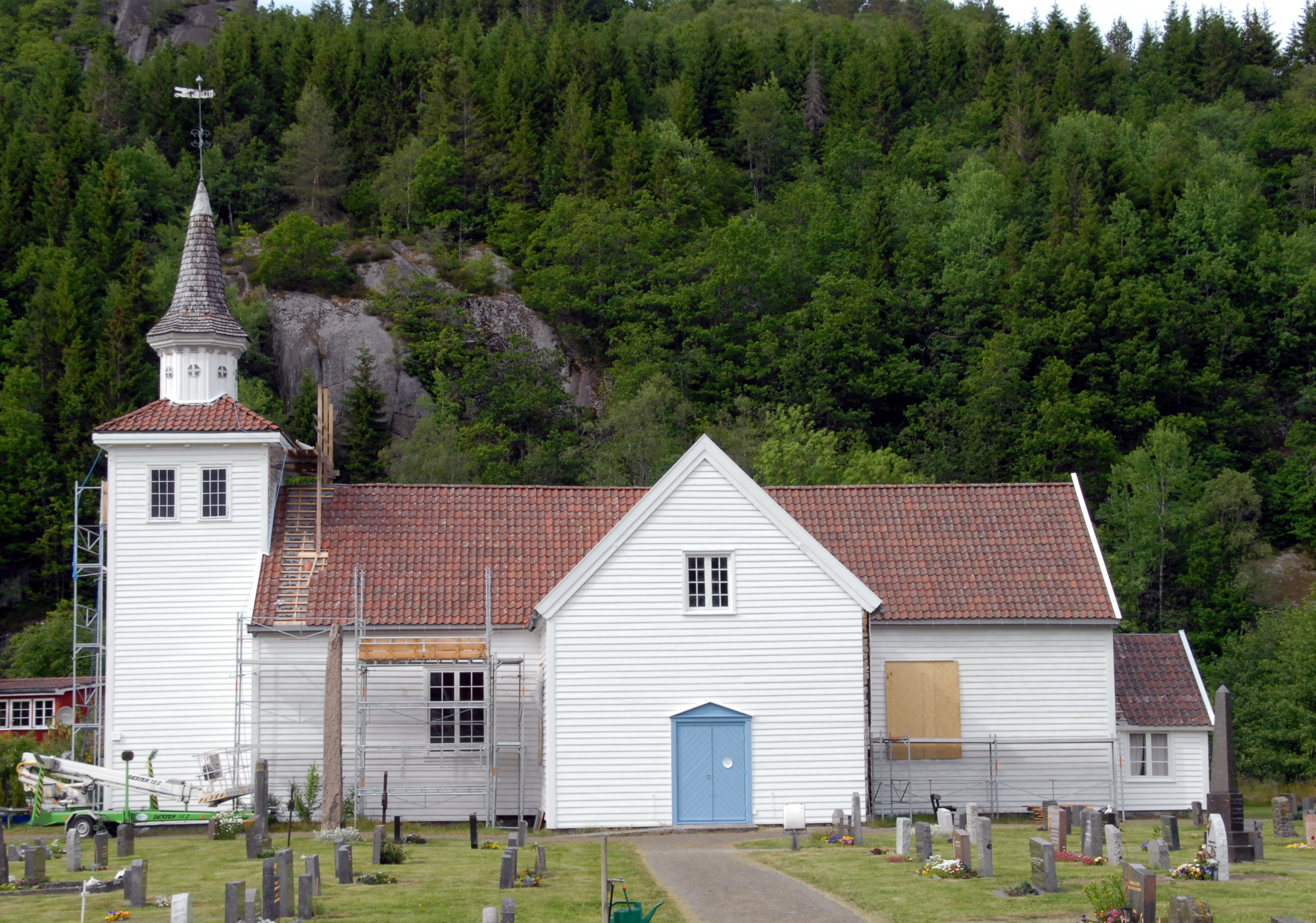
Austad Church

The Church of Norway has five parishes (sokn) within Lyngdal Municipality. It is part of the Lister og Mandal prosti (deanery) in the Diocese of Agder og Telemark.

Churches in Lyngdal Municipality
Parish (sokn)	Church name	Location of the church	Year built
Austad	Austad Church	Austad	1803
Austad	Korshamn Chapel	Korshavn	1906
Grindheim	Grindheim Church	Byremo	1783
Konsmo	Konsmo Church	Konsmo	1802
Kvås	Kvås Church	Kvås	1836
Lyngdal	Lyngdal Church	Lyngdal	1848

== History ==
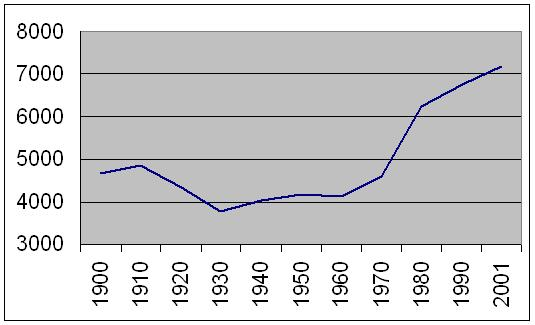
Population of Lyngdal, 1900-2001 (SSB).

The island of Sælør on the southern coast of the municipality is mentioned in Snorre, as the king Saint Olav spent a winter here in 1028. Based around the port of Agnefest, Lyngdal prospered on maritime trade, and in 1771 an application was made for status as a small coastal town. Its coastal location also facilitated emigration; in the 17th and 18th century largely to the Dutch Republic, and in the 19th century to the United States.

Even before the merger of the municipalities in 1964, the parishes of Austad and Kvås, together with Å (or Aa - Lyngdal proper), made up the greater Lyngdal parish. A census from 1801 showed 3529 inhabitants in the area that today makes up Lyngdal: 1850 in Å, 929 in Austad, 585 in Kvås and 165 in the eastern part of Spangereid. The number today is approximately 8000 inhabitants.

Religious life and missionary work have always had a strong position in Lyngdal, and worthy of special note is the minister Gabriel Kielland (1796–1854), who served in the parish from 1837 to 1854, and his wife Gustava (1800–1889). Known today as a missionary pioneer and a popular songwriter, Gustava also wrote one of the first autobiographies by a woman in Norway: her "Reminiscence from my Life" from 1880.

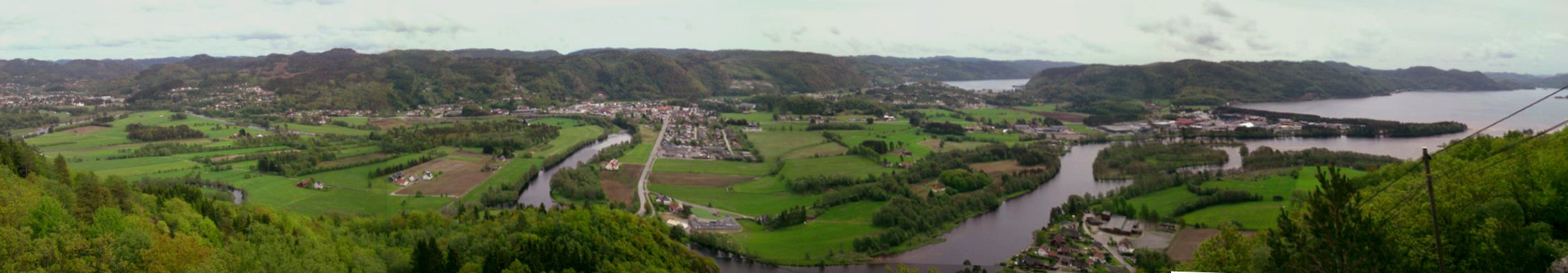
Panorama of Lyngdal, Vest-Agder

== Geography ==
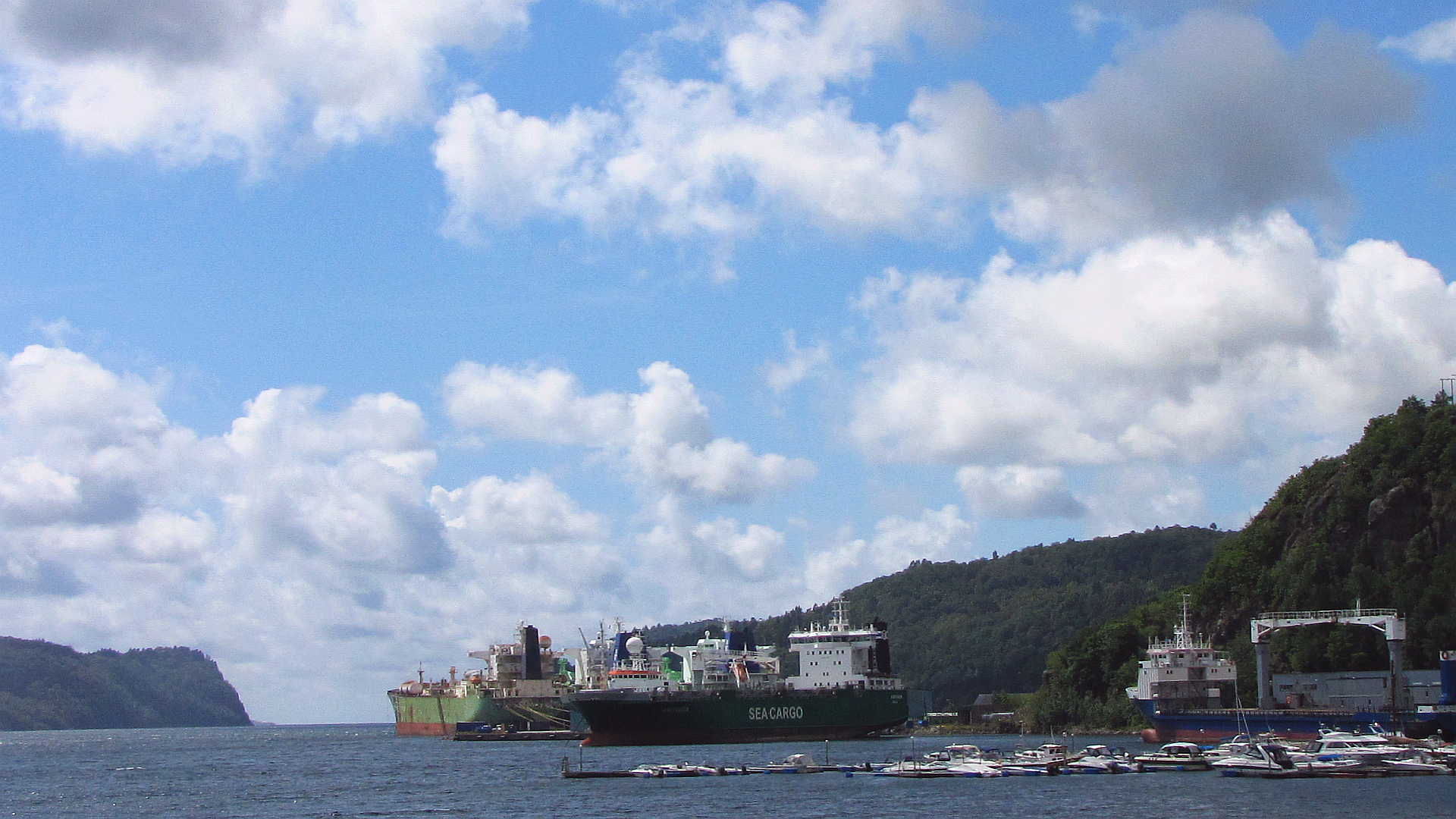
Agnefest in the south of Lyngdal has since 1771 an approved natural harbor on the Rosfjord

Lyngdal is a coastal municipality that and borders Lindesnes Municipality to the east; Evje og Hornnes Municipality and Åseral Municipality to the north; and Hægebostad Municipality, Kvinesdal Municipality, and Farsund Municipality to the west. Lyngdal Municipality includes the southern portion of the Lyngdalen valley which follows the river Lygna to the Lyngdalsfjorden in the west. The northern part of the municipality includes the Audnedalen valley which follows the river Audna

The Lenesfjorden, Grønsfjorden, and Rosfjorden also are located in the southern part of Lyngdal. The lake Ytre Øydnavatnet is located in the municipality. The village of Agnefest has a large natural harbour on the south side of the town of Lyngdal. This harbour is on the Rosfjorden and it has been in use since 1771. The highest point in the municipality is the 578.09-metre (1,896.6 ft) tall mountain Ørnemyrfjellet in the northern part of the municipality.

=== Climate ===
Climate data for Lyngdal 1991-2020 (6 m, precipitation 1961-90)
Month	Jan	Feb	Mar	Apr	May	Jun	Jul	Aug	Sep	Oct	Nov	Dec	Year
Daily mean °C (°F)	1.3 (34.3)	1 (34)	2.8 (37.0)	6.5 (43.7)	10.5 (50.9)	13.9 (57.0)	16.1 (61.0)	15.6 (60.1)	12.2 (54.0)	8.0 (46.4)	4.5 (40.1)	1.9 (35.4)	7.9 (46.2)
Average precipitation mm (inches)	167 (6.6)	112 (4.4)	118 (4.6)	79 (3.1)	104 (4.1)	95 (3.7)	109 (4.3)	148 (5.8)	198 (7.8)	219 (8.6)	223 (8.8)	173 (6.8)	1,745 (68.7)
Source: Norwegian Meteorological Institute

Climate data for Konsmo - Høyland 1991-2020 (263 m)
Month	Jan	Feb	Mar	Apr	May	Jun	Jul	Aug	Sep	Oct	Nov	Dec	Year
Mean daily maximum °C (°F)	1.5 (34.7)	1.9 (35.4)	4.4 (39.9)	9.1 (48.4)	13.8 (56.8)	17.1 (62.8)	19.2 (66.6)	18.4 (65.1)	14.3 (57.7)	9.3 (48.7)	5 (41)	2 (36)	9.7 (49.4)
Mean daily minimum °C (°F)	−3.4 (25.9)	−3.5 (25.7)	−1.9 (28.6)	1 (34)	4.6 (40.3)	7.9 (46.2)	10.5 (50.9)	10.1 (50.2)	7.6 (45.7)	3.8 (38.8)	0.3 (32.5)	−2.9 (26.8)	2.8 (37.1)
Source: NOAA - WMO averages 91-2020 Norway

== Government ==
Lyngdal Municipality is responsible for primary education (through 10th grade), outpatient health services, senior citizen services, welfare and other social services, zoning, economic development, and municipal roads and utilities. The municipality is governed by a municipal council of directly elected representatives. The mayor is indirectly elected by a vote of the municipal council. The municipality is under the jurisdiction of the Agder District Court and the Agder Court of Appeal.

=== Municipal council ===
The municipal council (Kommunestyre) of Lyngdal Municipality is made up of 29 representatives that are elected to four year terms. The tables below show the current and historical composition of the council by political party.

Lyngdal kommunestyre 2023–2027
Party name (in Norwegian)	Number of representatives
Labour Party (Arbeiderpartiet)	3
Progress Party (Fremskrittspartiet)	10
Conservative Party (Høyre)	5
Industry and Business Party (Industri‑ og Næringspartiet)	1
Christian Democratic Party (Kristelig Folkeparti)	5
Centre Party (Senterpartiet)	3
Liberal Party (Venstre)	2
Total number of members:	29

Lyngdal kommunestyre 2019–2023
Party name (in Norwegian)	Number of representatives
Labour Party (Arbeiderpartiet)	5
Progress Party (Fremskrittspartiet)	4
Conservative Party (Høyre)	10
Christian Democratic Party (Kristelig Folkeparti)	8
Red Party (Rødt)	1
Centre Party (Senterpartiet)	6
Liberal Party (Venstre)	1
Total number of members:	35
Note: On 1 January 2020, Audnedal Municipality became part of Lyngdal Municipality.

Lyngdal kommunestyre 2015–2019
Party name (in Norwegian)	Number of representatives
Labour Party (Arbeiderpartiet)	3
Progress Party (Fremskrittspartiet)	3
Conservative Party (Høyre)	12
Christian Democratic Party (Kristelig Folkeparti)	6
Centre Party (Senterpartiet)	3
Liberal Party (Venstre)	2
Total number of members:	29

Lyngdal kommunestyre 2011–2015
Party name (in Norwegian)	Number of representatives
Labour Party (Arbeiderpartiet)	3
Progress Party (Fremskrittspartiet)	3
Conservative Party (Høyre)	13
Christian Democratic Party (Kristelig Folkeparti)	5
Centre Party (Senterpartiet)	3
Socialist Left Party (Sosialistisk Venstreparti)	1
Liberal Party (Venstre)	1
Total number of members:	29

Lyngdal kommunestyre 2007–2011
Party name (in Norwegian)	Number of representatives
Labour Party (Arbeiderpartiet)	2
Progress Party (Fremskrittspartiet)	6
Conservative Party (Høyre)	8
Christian Democratic Party (Kristelig Folkeparti)	7
Centre Party (Senterpartiet)	2
Socialist Left Party (Sosialistisk Venstreparti)	1
Liberal Party (Venstre)	3
Total number of members:	29

Lyngdal kommunestyre 2003–2007
Party name (in Norwegian)	Number of representatives
Labour Party (Arbeiderpartiet)	5
Progress Party (Fremskrittspartiet)	5
Conservative Party (Høyre)	5
Christian Democratic Party (Kristelig Folkeparti)	7
Centre Party (Senterpartiet)	3
Socialist Left Party (Sosialistisk Venstreparti)	2
Liberal Party (Venstre)	2
Total number of members:	29

Lyngdal kommunestyre 1999–2003
Party name (in Norwegian)	Number of representatives
Labour Party (Arbeiderpartiet)	4
Progress Party (Fremskrittspartiet)	4
Conservative Party (Høyre)	5
Christian Democratic Party (Kristelig Folkeparti)	11
Centre Party (Senterpartiet)	3
Liberal Party (Venstre)	2
Total number of members:	29

Lyngdal kommunestyre 1995–1999
Party name (in Norwegian)	Number of representatives
Labour Party (Arbeiderpartiet)	6
Progress Party (Fremskrittspartiet)	2
Conservative Party (Høyre)	5
Christian Democratic Party (Kristelig Folkeparti)	9
Centre Party (Senterpartiet)	4
Liberal Party (Venstre)	3
Total number of members:	29

Lyngdal kommunestyre 1991–1995
Party name (in Norwegian)	Number of representatives
Labour Party (Arbeiderpartiet)	4
Progress Party (Fremskrittspartiet)	2
Conservative Party (Høyre)	9
Christian Democratic Party (Kristelig Folkeparti)	8
Centre Party (Senterpartiet)	4
Liberal Party (Venstre)	2
Total number of members:	29

Lyngdal kommunestyre 1987–1991
Party name (in Norwegian)	Number of representatives
Labour Party (Arbeiderpartiet)	5
Progress Party (Fremskrittspartiet)	3
Conservative Party (Høyre)	8
Christian Democratic Party (Kristelig Folkeparti)	8
Centre Party (Senterpartiet)	3
Joint list of the Liberal Party (Venstre) and Liberal People's Party (Liberale Folkepartiet)	2
Total number of members:	29

Lyngdal kommunestyre 1983–1987
Party name (in Norwegian)	Number of representatives
Labour Party (Arbeiderpartiet)	6
Progress Party (Fremskrittspartiet)	2
Conservative Party (Høyre)	9
Christian Democratic Party (Kristelig Folkeparti)	7
Centre Party (Senterpartiet)	3
Liberal Party (Venstre)	2
Total number of members:	29

Lyngdal kommunestyre 1979–1983
Party name (in Norwegian)	Number of representatives
Labour Party (Arbeiderpartiet)	4
Conservative Party (Høyre)	12
Christian Democratic Party (Kristelig Folkeparti)	6
New People's Party (Nye Folkepartiet)	1
Centre Party (Senterpartiet)	4
Liberal Party (Venstre)	2
Total number of members:	29

Lyngdal kommunestyre 1975–1979
Party name (in Norwegian)	Number of representatives
Labour Party (Arbeiderpartiet)	5
Conservative Party (Høyre)	10
Christian Democratic Party (Kristelig Folkeparti)	6
New People's Party (Nye Folkepartiet)	3
Centre Party (Senterpartiet)	5
Total number of members:	29

Lyngdal kommunestyre 1971–1975
Party name (in Norwegian)	Number of representatives
Labour Party (Arbeiderpartiet)	7
Conservative Party (Høyre)	8
Christian Democratic Party (Kristelig Folkeparti)	5
Centre Party (Senterpartiet)	6
Liberal Party (Venstre)	3
Total number of members:	29

Lyngdal kommunestyre 1967–1971
Party name (in Norwegian)	Number of representatives
Labour Party (Arbeiderpartiet)	6
Conservative Party (Høyre)	8
Christian Democratic Party (Kristelig Folkeparti)	4
Centre Party (Senterpartiet)	6
Liberal Party (Venstre)	5
Total number of members:	29

Lyngdal kommunestyre 1963–1967
Party name (in Norwegian)	Number of representatives
Labour Party (Arbeiderpartiet)	6
Conservative Party (Høyre)	8
Christian Democratic Party (Kristelig Folkeparti)	6
Centre Party (Senterpartiet)	5
Liberal Party (Venstre)	4
Total number of members:	29

Lyngdal herredsstyre 1959–1963
Party name (in Norwegian)	Number of representatives
Labour Party (Arbeiderpartiet)	3
Conservative Party (Høyre)	6
Christian Democratic Party (Kristelig Folkeparti)	4
Centre Party (Senterpartiet)	5
Liberal Party (Venstre)	3
Total number of members:	21

Lyngdal herredsstyre 1955–1959
Party name (in Norwegian)	Number of representatives
Labour Party (Arbeiderpartiet)	3
Conservative Party (Høyre)	5
Christian Democratic Party (Kristelig Folkeparti)	4
Farmers' Party (Bondepartiet)	6
Liberal Party (Venstre)	3
Total number of members:	21

Lyngdal herredsstyre 1951–1955
Party name (in Norwegian)	Number of representatives
Labour Party (Arbeiderpartiet)	3
Conservative Party (Høyre)	6
Christian Democratic Party (Kristelig Folkeparti)	5
Farmers' Party (Bondepartiet)	6
Liberal Party (Venstre)	4
Total number of members:	24

Lyngdal herredsstyre 1947–1951
Party name (in Norwegian)	Number of representatives
Labour Party (Arbeiderpartiet)	3
Conservative Party (Høyre)	5
Christian Democratic Party (Kristelig Folkeparti)	3
Farmers' Party (Bondepartiet)	8
Liberal Party (Venstre)	5
Total number of members:	24

Lyngdal herredsstyre 1945–1947
Party name (in Norwegian)	Number of representatives
Labour Party (Arbeiderpartiet)	5
Conservative Party (Høyre)	4
Farmers' Party (Bondepartiet)	10
Liberal Party (Venstre)	5
Total number of members:	24

Lyngdal herredsstyre 1937–1941*
Party name (in Norwegian)	Number of representatives
Labour Party (Arbeiderpartiet)	4
Conservative Party (Høyre)	6
Farmers' Party (Bondepartiet)	8
Liberal Party (Venstre)	6
Total number of members:	24
Note: Due to the German occupation of Norway during World War II, no elections were held for new municipal councils until after the war ended in 1945.

=== Mayors ===
The mayor (Norwegian: ordfører) of Lyngdal Municipality is the political leader of the municipality and the chairperson of the municipal council. The following people have held this position:

- 1838–1841: Capt. Abraham Severin Holbye
- 1842–1843: Abraham T. Kvelland
- 1844–1857: Aanen Olsen Bergsager
- 1858–1861: Lars Tallaksen Foss
- 1862–1877: Aanen Olsen Bergsager
- 1878–1881: Eilert Paulsen Tjersland
- 1882–1893: Erik Jaabæk
- 1894–1901: Nils Tobias Larsen Foss
- 1902–1904: Erik Jaabæk
- 1905–1907: Nils Tobias Larsen Foss
- 1907–1908: Andreas O. Vegge
- 1909–1913: Gabriel A. Svenevig
- 1914–1916: Karl P. Lehne
- 1917–1919: Jørgen Aarnæs
- 1920–1931: Olaus Kvaavik
- 1932–1934: Abel Fidjeland
- 1935–1937: Olaus Kvaavik
- 1938–1941: Abel Fidjeland
- 1942–1943: Olav Harveland (NS)
- 1943–1945: Torleiv Seland (NS)
- 1945–1947: Abel Fidjeland
- 1948–1955: Mikal Grøvan
- 1956–1959: Olav Drangeid
- 1960–1963: Thorvald Hagen
- 1964–1967: Olav Benestvedt
- 1968–1975: Thorvald Hagen (Sp)
- 1976–1979: Carl Johan Lehne (H)
- 1979–1983: Oluf Opsahl (KrF)
- 1983–1995: Anders Nøkland (H)
- 1995–2007: Hans Fredrik Grøvan (KrF)
- 2007–2013: Ingunn Foss (H)
- 2013–2023: Jan Kristensen (H)
- 2023–present: Unni Nilsen Husøy (FrP)

== Transportation ==
Bus lines from/through Lyngdal Bus Terminal:

Line	Destination
451	Lyngdal - Flekkefjord/Kvinesdal
781	Lyngdal - Snartemo S
900	Kristiansand - Mandal - Farsund
900	Kristiansand - Mandal - Lista
900	Lyngdal - Farsund - Lista

== Notable people ==
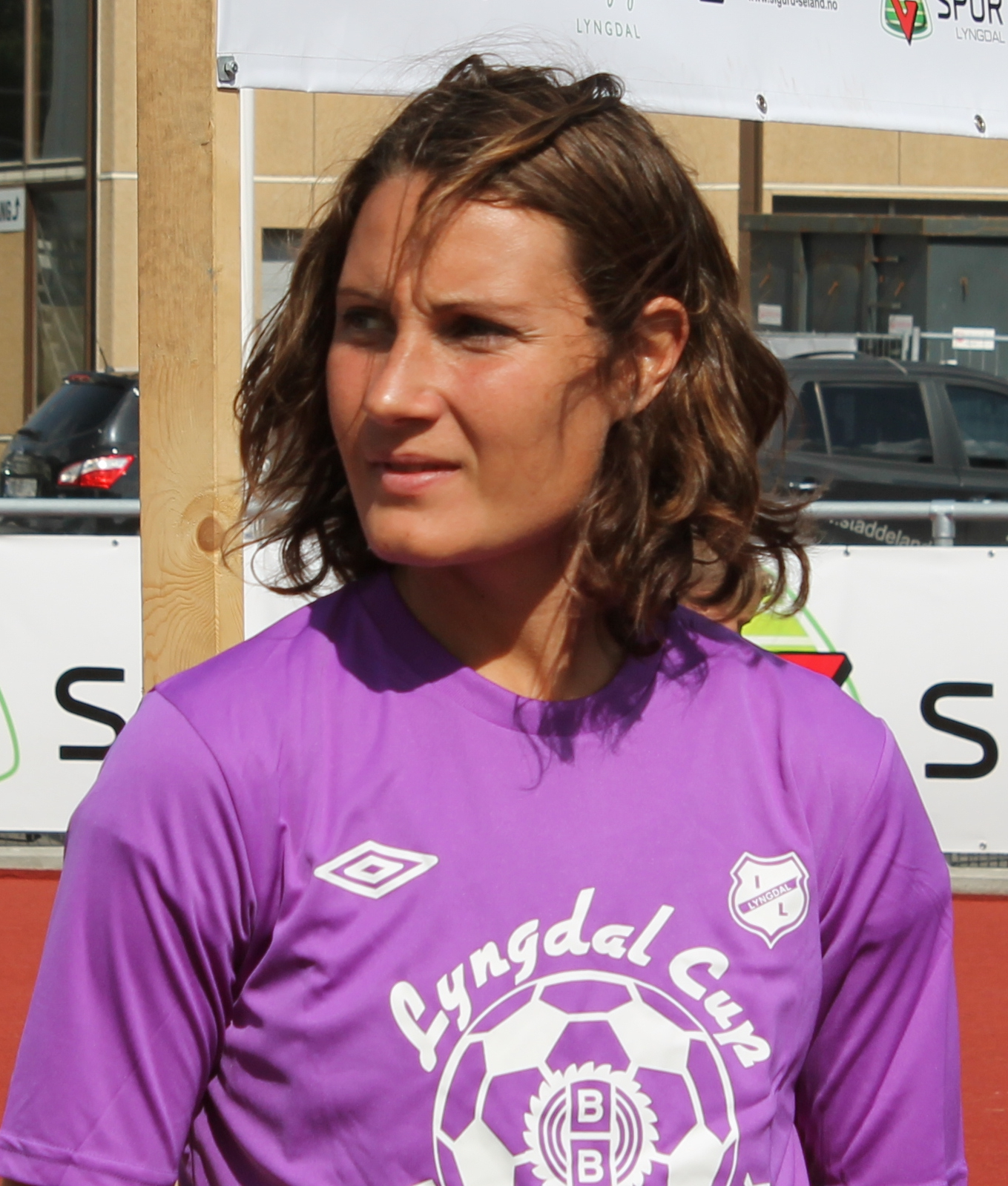
Ingvild Stensland, 2012

- Teis Lundegaard (1774 in Austad – 1856), a farmer, shipowner, and politician
- Abraham Berge (1851 in Lyngdal – 1936), a politician who was Prime Minister of Norway from 1923 to 1924
- Kristian Andvord (1855 in Lyngdal – 1934), a physician and medical researcher into tuberculosis
- Theodore Abrahamson (1900 in Lyngdal - 1978), a dairy farmer and politician; Mayor of Tigerton, Wisconsin
- Kjell Elvis (born 1968), a professional Elvis Presley impersonator, lives in Lyngdal
- Frostskade (born 1992), a dungeon synth artist originally from Algarve in Portugal

=== Sport ===
- Ingvild Stensland (born 1981), a footballer, 144 caps for Norway women, grew up in Lyngdal
- Stefan Strandberg (born 1990 in Lyngdal), a footballer with 230 club caps and 12 for Norway
- Zlatko Tripić (born 1992), a Norwegian-Bosnian footballer with over 200 club caps, grew up in Lyngdal
- Julian Ryerson (born 1997), a Norwegian-American footballer playing for Borussia Dortmund in Germany, born in Lyngdal.
