= Alleen =

Alleen Lyngdal
- Town/City
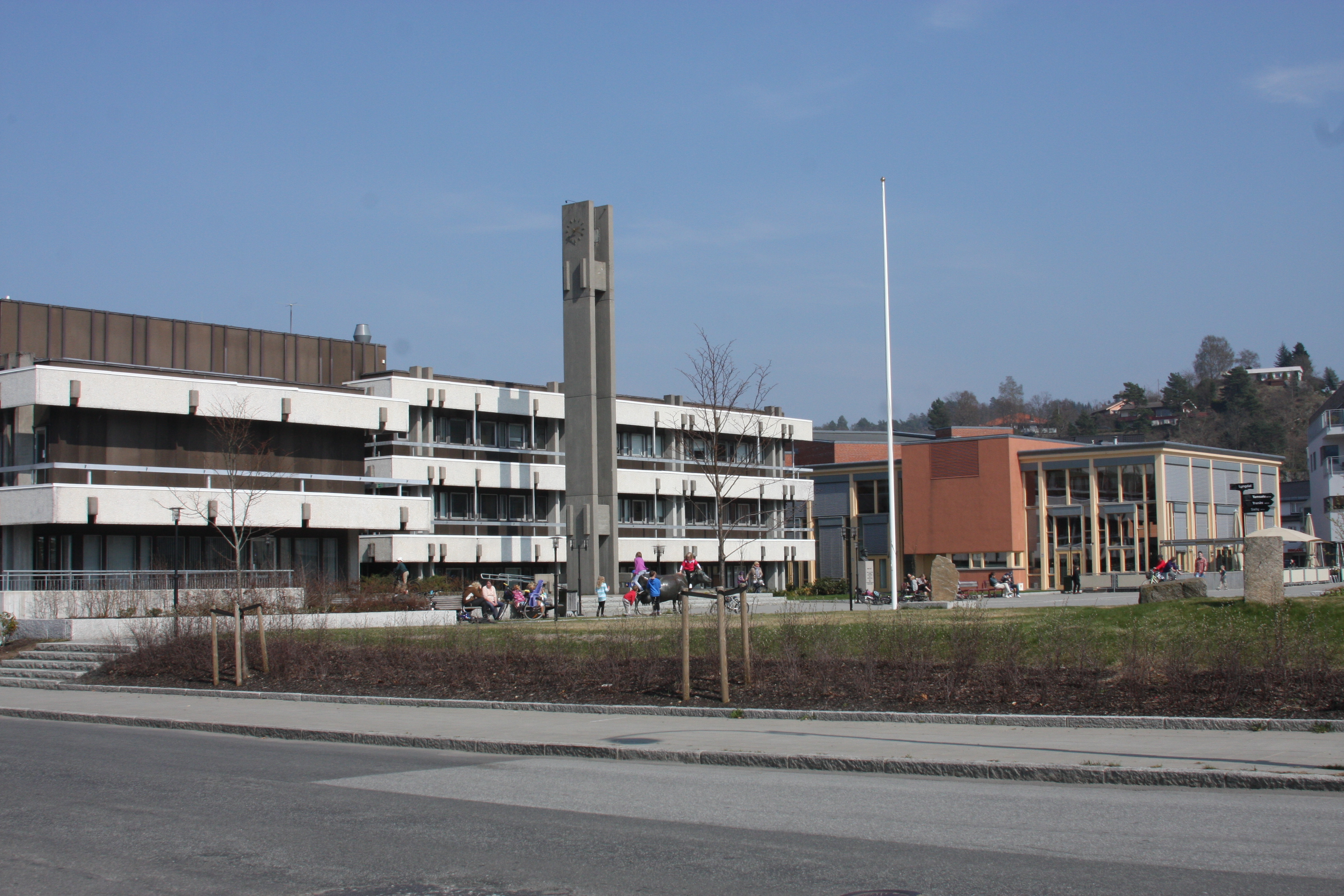
- View of the government building for Lyngdal Municipality
- Interactive map of Alleen
- Coordinates: 58.1376°N 7.07002°E
- Country: Norway
- Region: Southern Norway
- County: Agder
- District: Lister
- Municipality: Lyngdal Municipality
- Established as
- Town (By): 1 Jan 2001

Area
  - Total: 4.04 km^{2} (1.56 sq mi)
- Elevation: 9 m (30 ft)

Population (2025)
  - Total: 5,631
  - Density: 1,394/km^{2} (3,610/sq mi)
- Time zone: UTC+01:00 (CET)
  - Summer (DST): UTC+02:00 (CEST)
- Post Code: 4580 Lyngdal

Alleen or Lyngdal is a town which is the administrative centre of Lyngdal Municipality in Agder county, Norway. It lies along the east side of the river Lygna, just north of the head of the Rosfjorden and northeast of the head of the Lyngdalsfjorden. The small villages of Skomrag and Svenevik both lie just south of the town, and the small farming area of Hæåk lies about 8 kilometres (5.0 mi) to the northwest.

The 4.04-square-kilometre (1,000-acre) town has a population (2025) of 5,631 and a population density of 1,394 inhabitants per square kilometre (3,610/sq mi).

Lyngdal Church lies in the northern part of the town. The European route E39 highway and County Road 43 both pass through the town. It previously had an annual cattle auction. Alleen is the site of the largest primary and secondary schools in Lyngdal Municipality.

== History ==
On 1 January 2001, the municipal government declared the urban area of Alleen to be a town (by) called Lyngdal. Both names are used to refer to the urban area now. In Norwegian, the word by can be translated as either a "town" or "city" in English. Birthplace of Bergljot Aarnes Gustavsen.

== See also ==
- List of towns and cities in Norway
