= Austad Church (Lyngdal) =

Church in Agder, Norway

- Austad kirke
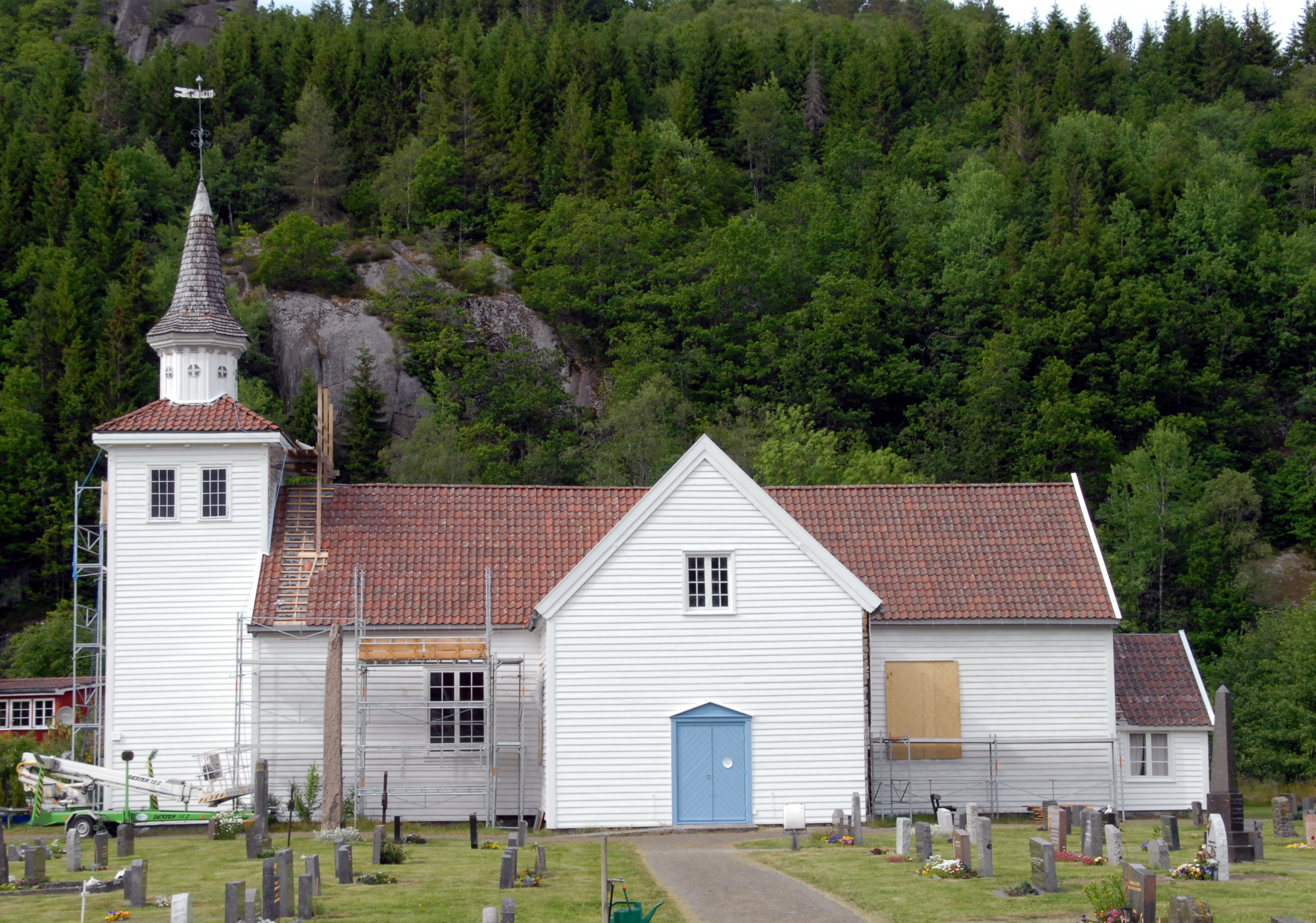
- View of the church
- Austad Church
- 58.0919°N 07.0460°E
- Location: Lyngdal Municipality, Agder
- Country: Norway
- Denomination: Church of Norway
- Churchmanship: Evangelical Lutheran

History
- Status: Parish church
- Founded: 1100s
- Consecrated: 1803

Architecture
- Functional status: Active
- Architect: Kornelius Nakkestad
- Architectural type: Cruciform
- Completed: 1803; 223 years ago

Specifications
- Capacity: 400
- Materials: Wood

Administration
- Diocese: Agder og Telemark
- Deanery: Lister og Mandal prosti
- Parish: Lyngdal
- Norwegian Cultural Heritage Site
- Type: Church
- Status: Listed
- ID: 83820

Austad Church (Norwegian: Austad kirke) is a parish church of the Church of Norway in Lyngdal Municipality in Agder county, Norway. It is located in the village of Austad. It is one of the churches for the Lyngdal parish which is part of the Lister og Mandal prosti (deanery) in the Diocese of Agder og Telemark. The white, wooden church was built in a cruciform design in 1803 using plans drawn up by the architect Kornelius Nakkestad. The church seats about 400 people.

== History ==
The earliest existing historical records of the church date back to the year 1328, but it was likely a stave church built in the mid- to late-1100s. In 1790, the old church building was described as "dilapidated" and partly a stave church construction and partly with timber-framed construction which means it was likely renovated and partially rebuilt over time. In 1803, the old church was torn down and a new church was built on the same site. During the construction, a coin found under the southern cross-arm of the new church was from the years 1299–1319.

== See also ==
- List of churches in Agder og Telemark
