= Rosfjorden =

Fjord in Agder, Norway

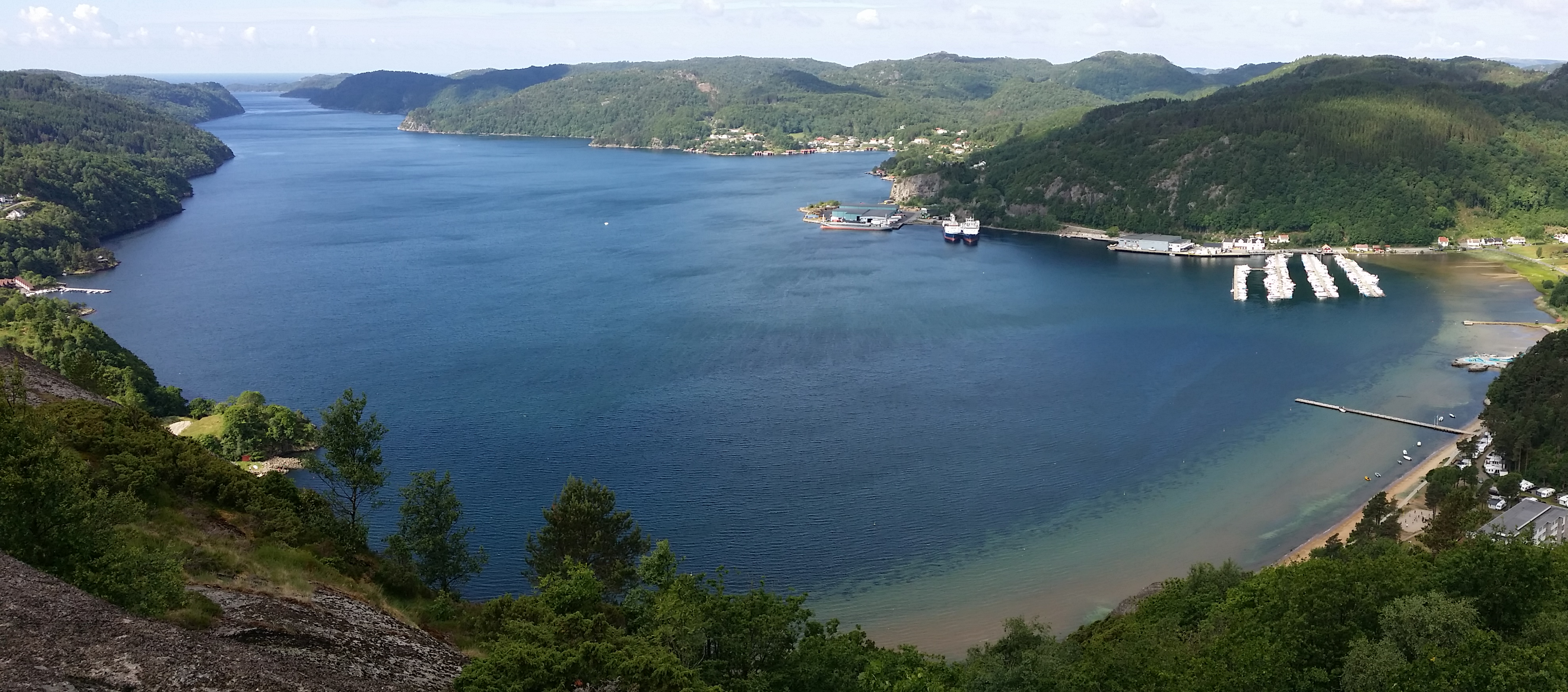
- View of the fjord, looking south.
- Interactive map of the fjord
- Location: Agder county, Norway
- Coordinates: 58.07696°N 7.00259°E
- Type: Fjord
- Primary outflows: North Sea
- Basin countries: Norway
- Max. length: 12 kilometres (7.5 mi)
- Settlements: Lyngdal

Rosfjorden is a fjord in Lyngdal Municipality in Agder county, Norway. The 12-kilometre (7.5 mi) long fjord runs from the town of Lyngdal to the North Sea in the south. The Austad peninsula lies on the east side of the fjord, with the village of Austad near the shoreline. The area surrounding the fjord was once part of the old Austad Municipality from 1909 until its dissolution in 1963.

The northern end of the fjord is the location of the Agnefest harbour, a deep water harbour which dates back to at least 1771. Because of the high salinity of the water, the fjord rarely freezes, making it a suitable harbour. Rosfjord Beach, a popular sandy beach in the summer, is also located at the northern end of the fjord. There is both a campsite and a hotel near the beach. Commercial camping on the site goes back to 1934. In the 1970s several cottages were built, and the hotel—Rosfjord Strandhotell—dates from 1986.

== Gallery ==
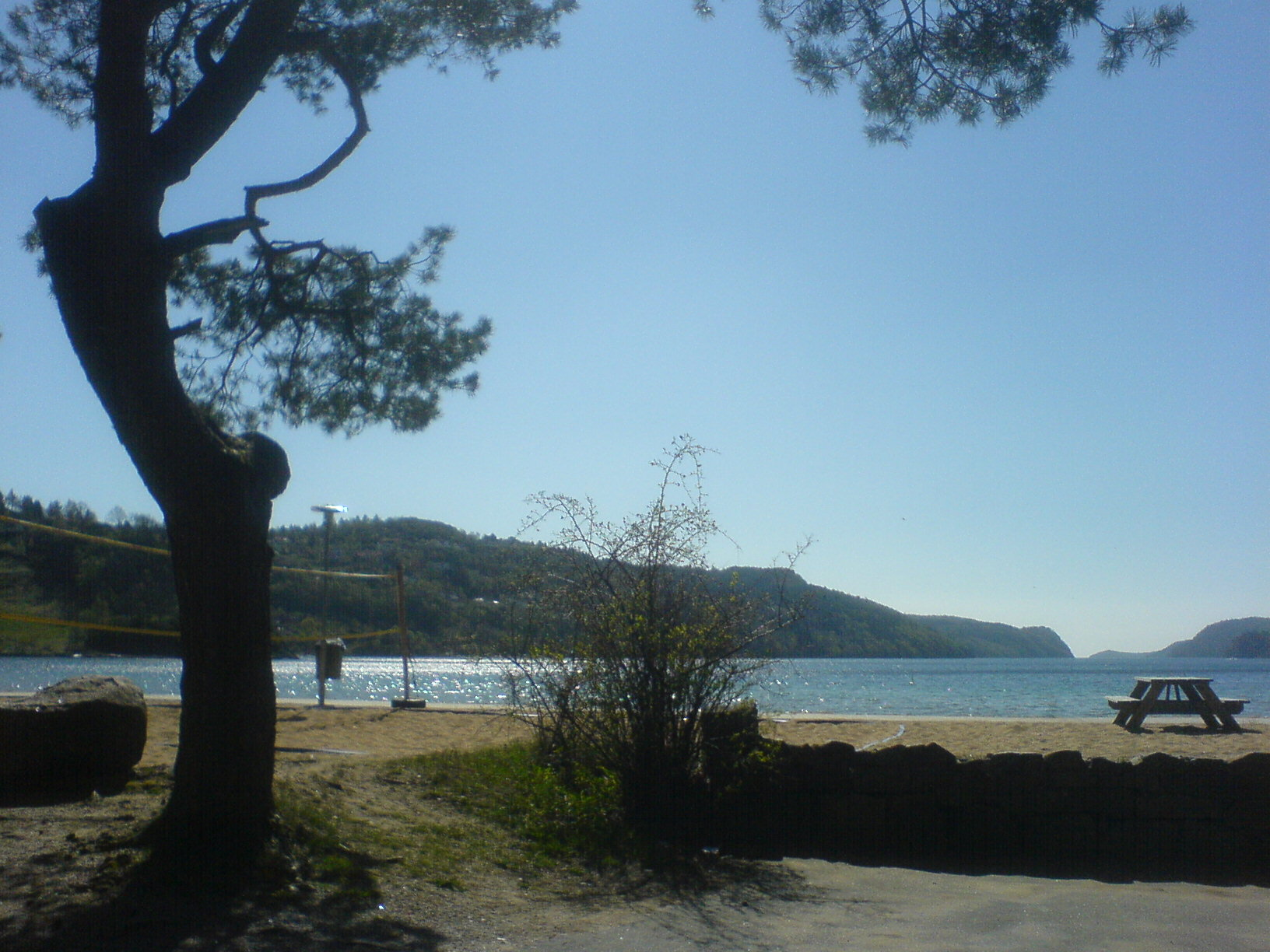
Rosfjord beach in April

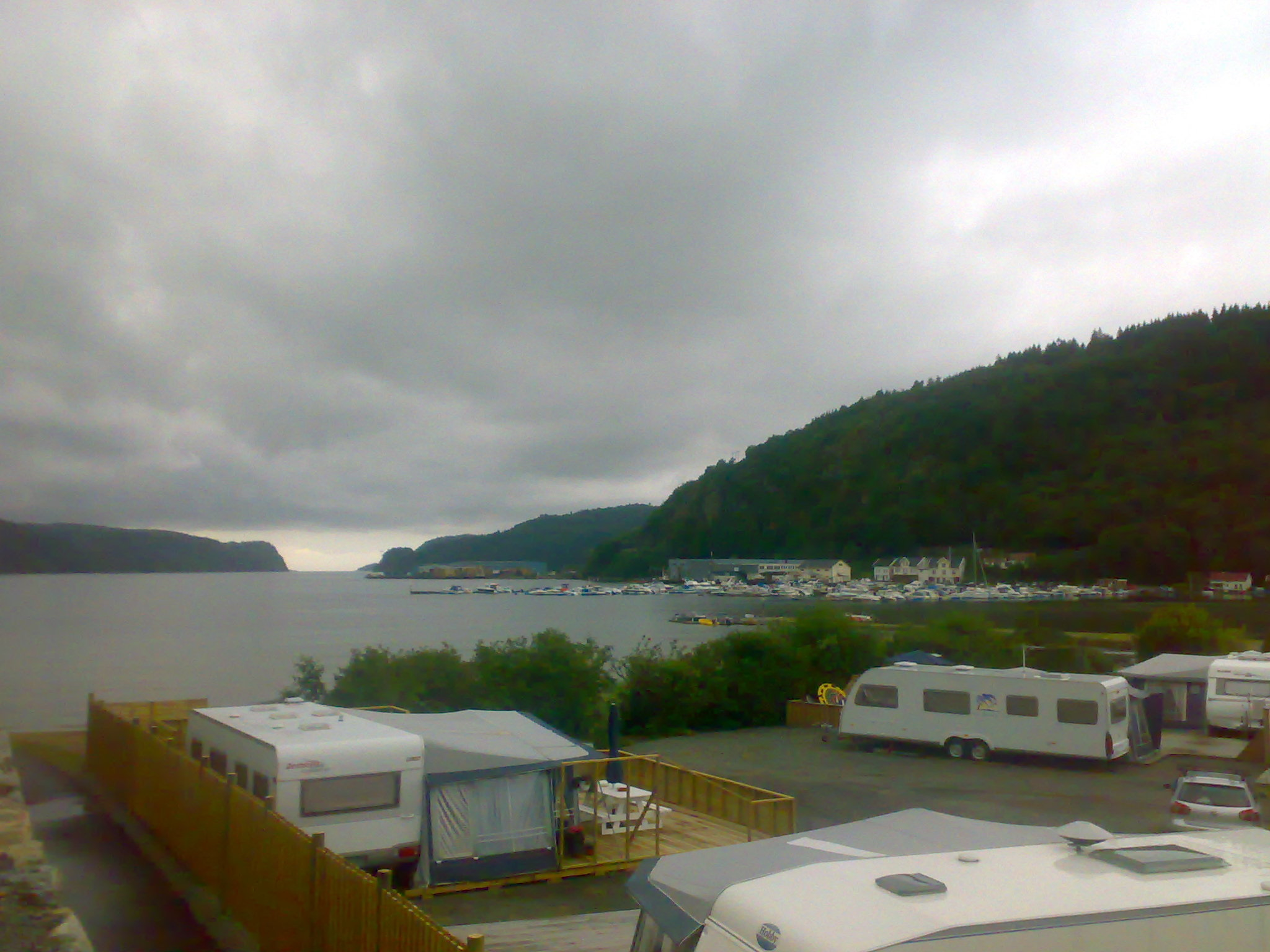
Lyngdal Bible Camp, along the fjord

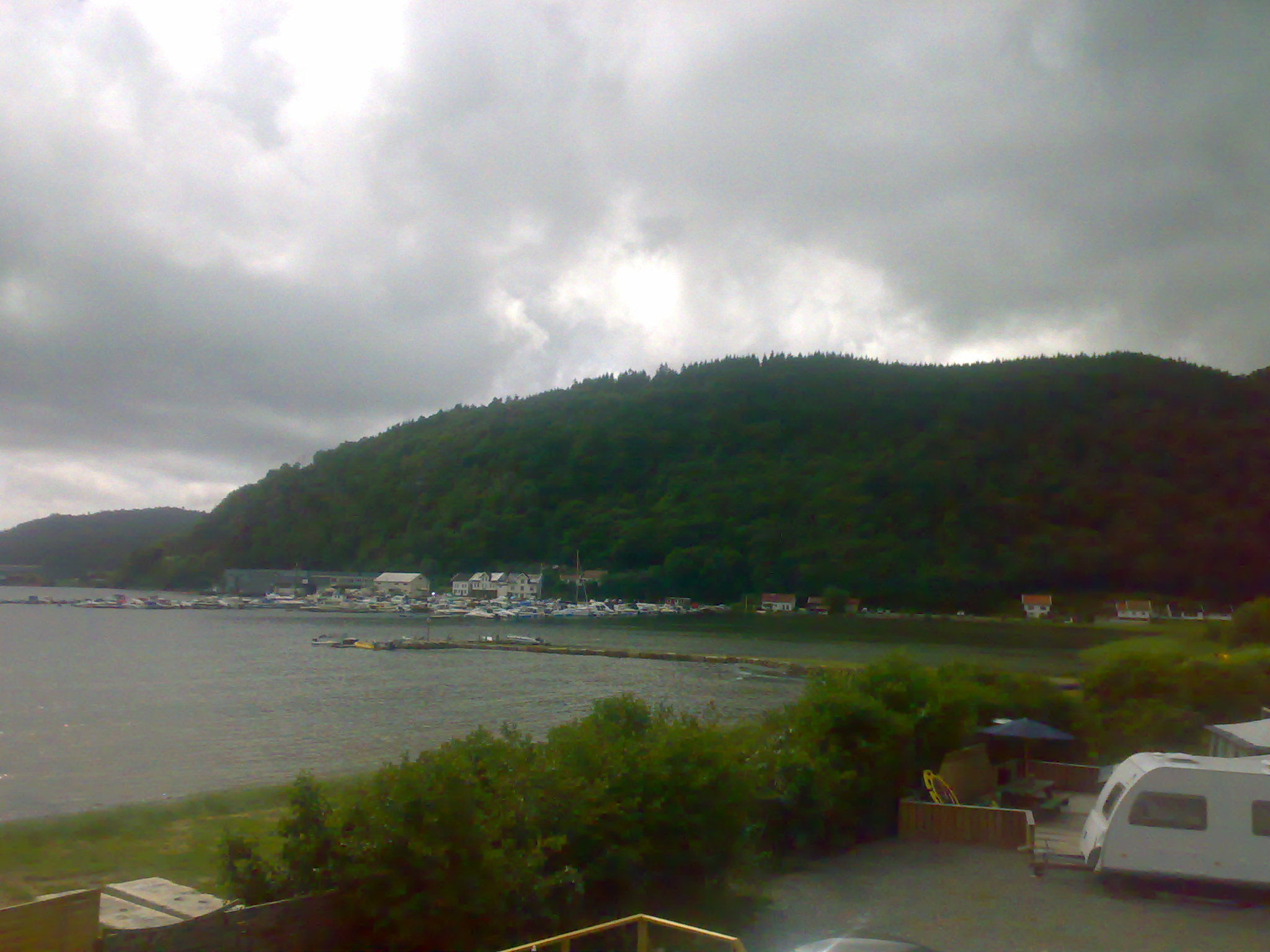
Agnefest at the north end of the fjord

== See also ==
- List of Norwegian fjords
