= Lister Region =

Lister Region Listerregionen
- Metropolitan Region (Metro)
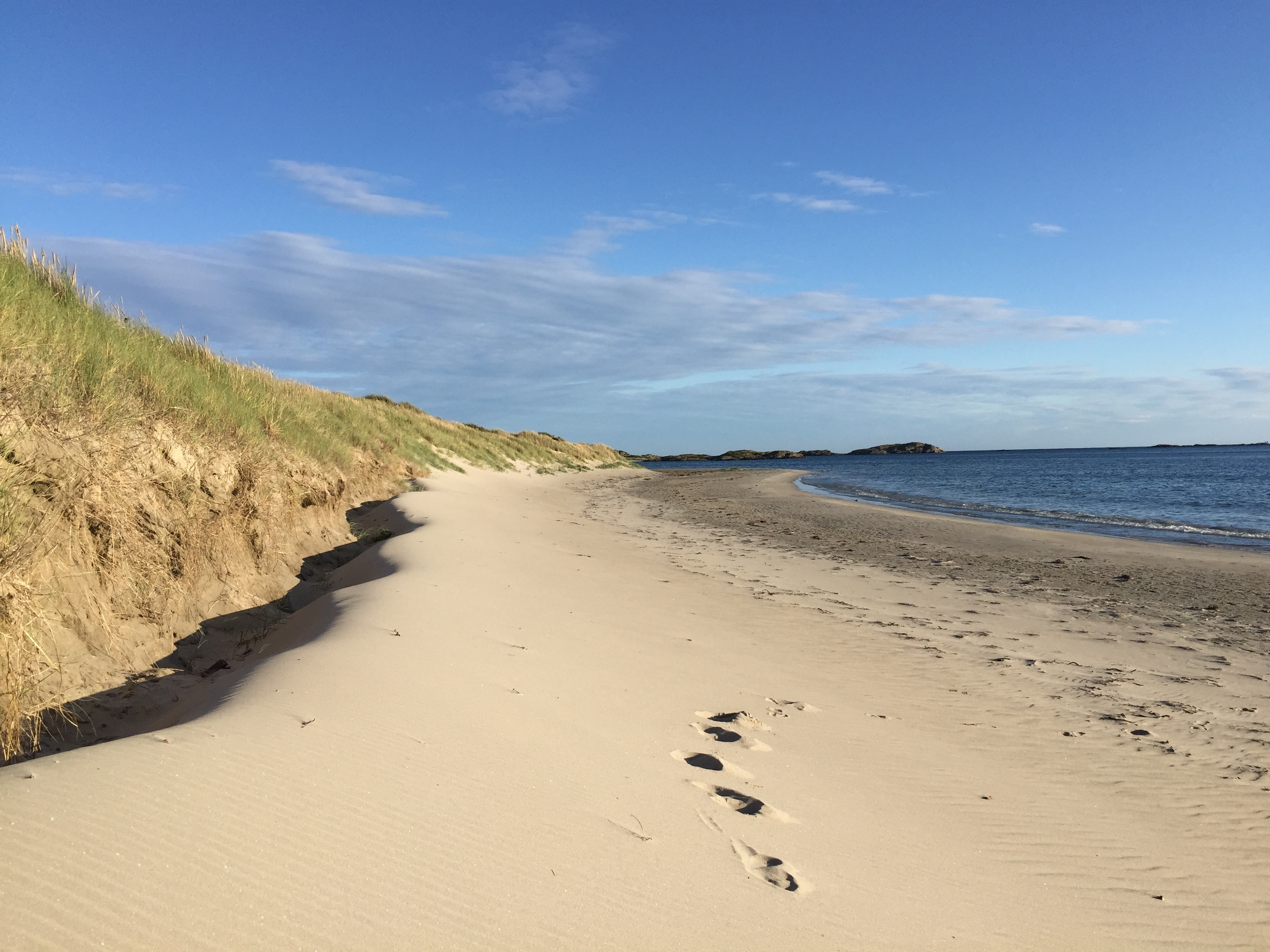
- The Lista Beaches

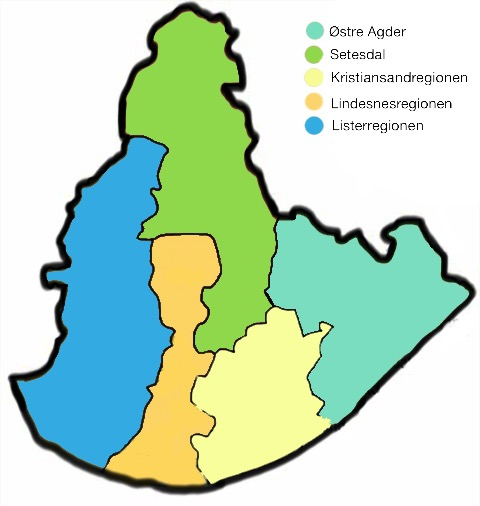
- Lister region in blue as it was in 2019, in the map of Southern Norway.
- Coordinates: 58.6°N 07.8°E
- Country: Norway
- County (fylke): Agder
- Towns: Farsund; Flekkefjord; Lyngdal

Population (2026)
  - Total: 40,191
- Time zone: UTC+01:00 (CET)
  - Summer (DST): UTC+02:00 (CEST)
- Website: Lister.no

Lister Region (Norwegian: Listerregionen) is a region in Southern Norway. It consists of the municipalities of Farsund, Flekkefjord, Hægebostad, Kvinesdal, Lyngdal, and Sirdal. The region borders Kristiansand Region in the east, Setesdal to the north, and Rogaland County to the west. There are three towns in Lister: Flekkefjord, Lyngdal, and Farsund.

== Municipalities ==
Name	Map	Coat of arms	Adm. center	Pop. (2026)	Area km^{2}	Language	Location
Farsund Municipality			Farsund	9,949	263	Bokmål	Coast
Flekkefjord Municipality			Flekkefjord	9,373	544	Bokmål	Coast with Rogaland County Border
Lyngdal Municipality			Alleen	10,922	643	Neutral	Coast/Inland
Hægebostad Municipality			Tingvatn	1,794	461	Nynorsk	Inland
Kvinesdal Municipality			Liknes	6,242	963	Neutral	Inland
Sirdal Municipality			Tonstad	1,911	1,554	Neutral	Inland with Rogaland County Border

== Media gallery ==
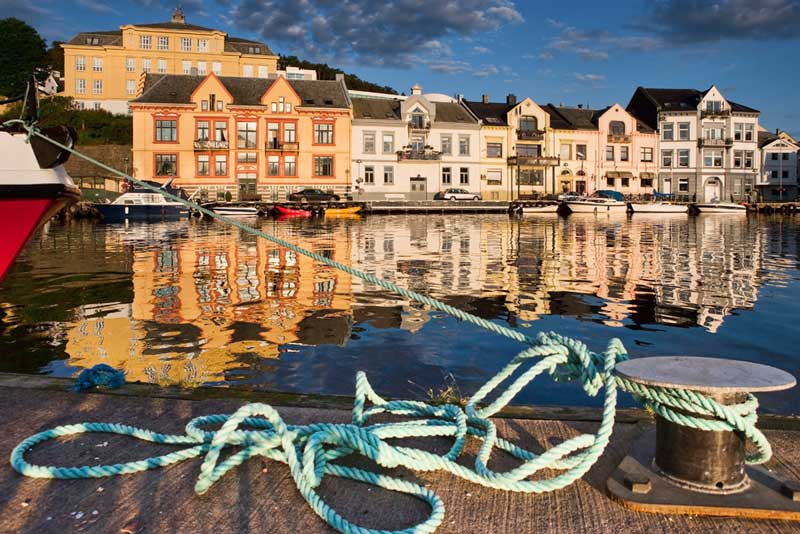
Farsund, the largest and oldest city in the Lister Region

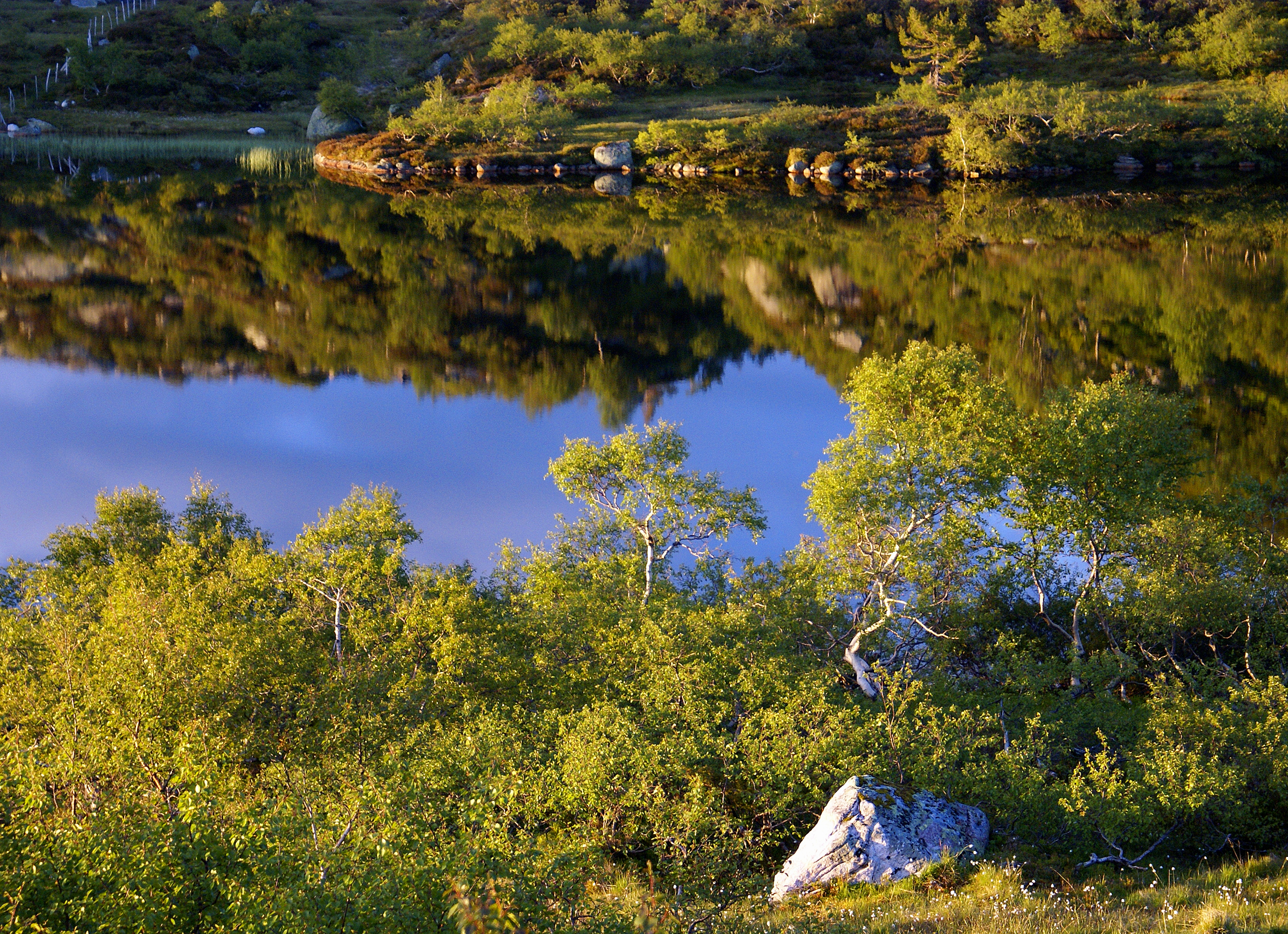
View from Sirdal

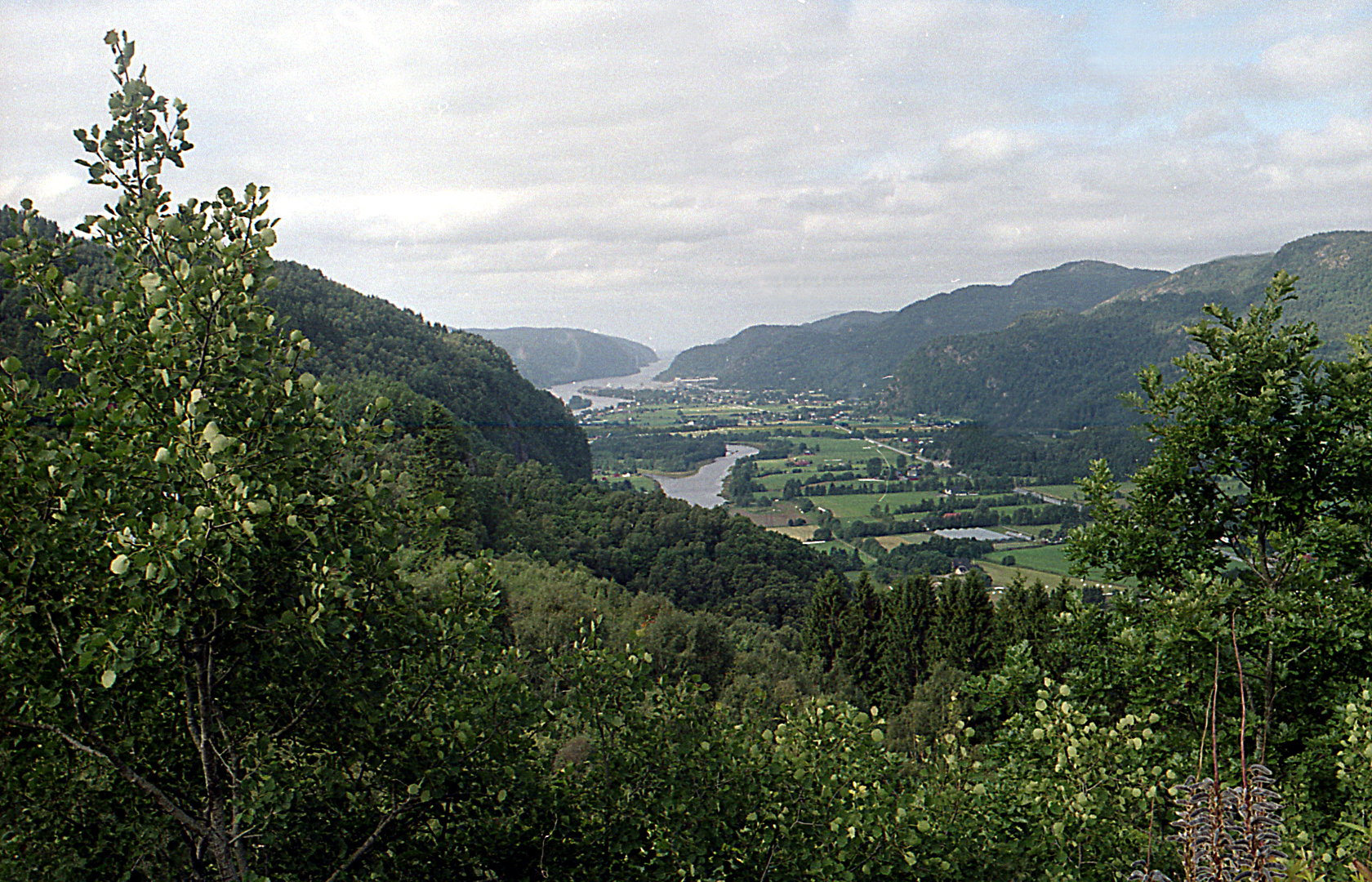
View of the Kvinesdal valley
