= Eiken =

Eiken may refer to:

== Places ==
=== Norway ===
- Eiken Municipality, a former municipality in the old Vest-Agder county
- Eiken, Agder, a village in Hægebostad municipality in Agder county
- Eiken Church, a church in Hægebostad municipality in Agder county

=== Switzerland ===
- Eiken, Aargau, a municipality in the district of Laufenburg in the canton of Aargau

== People with the given name ==
- Eiken Sato (佐藤 英賢; born 1986), Japanese equestrian

== Other uses ==
- Eiken (studio), an anime studio based in Tokyo, Japan
- STEP Eiken, a Japanese examination on the English language
- Eiken (manga), a manga/anime series
- Eiken syndrome, a rare autosomal bone dysplasia
- Eiken Chemical, a Japanese company headquartered in Tokyo
