= Eiken Municipality =

Former municipality in Vest-Agder, Norway

Eiken Municipality Eiken herred
- Former municipality
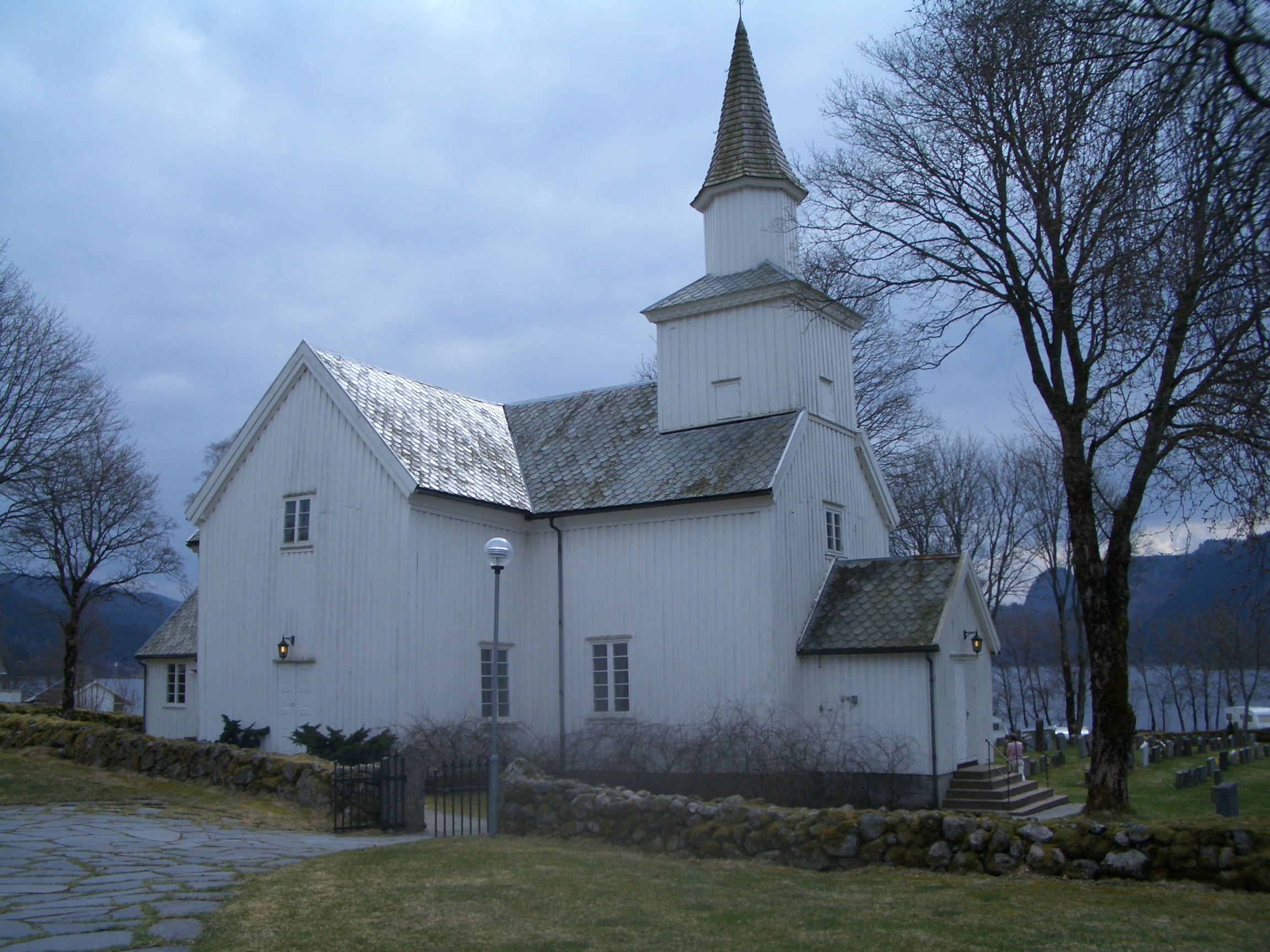
- View of the local church

- Vest-Agder within Norway

- Eiken within Vest-Agder
- Coordinates: 58°28′44″N 07°12′43″E
- Country: Norway
- County: Vest-Agder
- District: Lister
- Established: 1 Jan 1916
  - Preceded by: Hægebostad Municipality
- Disestablished: 1 Jan 1963
  - Succeeded by: Hægebostad Municipality
- Administrative centre: Eiken

Area (upon dissolution)
  - Total: 299.8 km^{2} (115.8 sq mi)
  - Rank: #285 in Norway
- Highest elevation: 966.2 m (3,170 ft)

Population (1962)
  - Total: 788
  - Rank: #658 in Norway
  - Density: 2.6/km^{2} (6.7/sq mi)
  - Change (10 years): ▼ −7.1%
- Demonym: Eikdøl

Official language
  - Norwegian form: Nynorsk
- Time zone: UTC+01:00 (CET)
  - Summer (DST): UTC+02:00 (CEST)
- ISO 3166 code: NO-1035

Eiken is a former municipality in the old Vest-Agder county, Norway. The 300-square-kilometre (120 sq mi) municipality existed from 1916 until its dissolution in 1963. The area is now part of Hægebostad Municipality in the traditional district of Lister in Agder county. The administrative centre was the village of Eiken where Eiken Church is located.

Prior to its dissolution in 1963, the 299.8-square-kilometre (115.8 sq mi) municipality was the 285th largest by area out of the 705 municipalities in Norway. Eiken Municipality was the 658th most populous municipality in Norway with a population of about 788. The municipality's population density was 2.6 inhabitants per square kilometre (6.7/sq mi) and its population had decreased by 7.1% over the previous 10-year period.

== General information ==
The municipality of Eiken was established on 1 January 1916 when the large Hægebostad Municipality was divided into two separate municipalities: the northern district (population: 932) became the new Eiken Municipality and the southern district (population: 867) continued as a smaller Hægebostad Municipality.

During the 1960s, there were many municipal mergers across Norway due to the work of the Schei Committee. On 1 January 1963, Eiken Municipality (population: 784) was dissolved and merged (back) into Hægebostad Municipality.

=== Name ===
The municipality (originally the parish) is named after the old Eiken farm (Old Norse: Æke). The name is the plural genitive case of the word eik which means "oak tree".

=== Churches ===
The Church of Norway had one parish (sokn) within Eiken Municipality. At the time of the municipal dissolution, it was part of the Hægebostad prestegjeld and the Lister prosti (deanery) in the Diocese of Agder.

Churches in Eiken Municipality
Parish (sokn)	Church name	Location of the church	Year built
Eiken	Eiken Church	Eiken	1817

== Geography ==
The municipality included the far northern end of the Lyngdalen valley from the lake Lygne to the mountains in the north. The highest point in the municipality was the 966.2-metre (3,170 ft) tall mountain Oddevassheia, located near the northernmost part of the municipality. Åseral Municipality was located to the northeast, Grindheim Municipality was located to the southeast, Hægebostad Municipality was located to the south, Kvinesdal Municipality was located to the southwest, and Fjotland Municipality was located to the west.

== Government ==
While it existed, Eiken Municipality was responsible for primary education (through 10th grade), outpatient health services, senior citizen services, welfare and other social services, zoning, economic development, and municipal roads and utilities. The municipality was governed by a municipal council of directly elected representatives. The mayor was indirectly elected by a vote of the municipal council. The municipality was under the jurisdiction of the Lyngdal District Court and the Agder Court of Appeal.

=== Municipal council ===
The municipal council (Heradsstyre) of Eiken Municipality was made up of representatives that were elected to four year terms. The tables below show the historical composition of the council by political party.

Eiken heradsstyre 1959–1962
Party name (in Nynorsk)	Number of representatives
Labour Party (Arbeidarpartiet)	2
Joint List(s) of Non-Socialist Parties (Borgarlege Felleslister)	4
Local List(s) (Lokale lister)	7
Total number of members:	13
Note: On 1 January 1963, Eiken Municipality became part of Hægebostad Municipality.

Eiken heradsstyre 1955–1959
Party name (in Nynorsk)	Number of representatives
Labour Party (Arbeidarpartiet)	2
Liberal Party (Venstre)	1
Joint List(s) of Non-Socialist Parties (Borgarlege Felleslister)	5
Local List(s) (Lokale lister)	5
Total number of members:	13

Eiken heradsstyre 1951–1955
Party name (in Nynorsk)	Number of representatives
Labour Party (Arbeidarpartiet)	3
Christian Democratic Party (Kristeleg Folkeparti)	3
Joint List(s) of Non-Socialist Parties (Borgarlege Felleslister)	3
Local List(s) (Lokale lister)	3
Total number of members:	12

Eiken heradsstyre 1947–1951
Party name (in Nynorsk)	Number of representatives
Labour Party (Arbeidarpartiet)	4
Joint List(s) of Non-Socialist Parties (Borgarlege Felleslister)	4
Local List(s) (Lokale lister)	4
Total number of members:	12

Eiken heradsstyre 1945–1947
Party name (in Nynorsk)	Number of representatives
Labour Party (Arbeidarpartiet)	4
Joint List(s) of Non-Socialist Parties (Borgarlege Felleslister)	5
Local List(s) (Lokale lister)	3
Total number of members:	12

Eiken heradsstyre 1937–1941*
Party name (in Nynorsk)	Number of representatives
Labour Party (Arbeidarpartiet)	4
Joint List(s) of Non-Socialist Parties (Borgarlege Felleslister)	6
Local List(s) (Lokale lister)	2
Total number of members:	12
Note: Due to the German occupation of Norway during World War II, no elections were held for new municipal councils until after the war ended in 1945.

=== Mayors ===
The mayor (Nynorsk: ordførar) of Eiken Municipality was the political leader of the municipality and the chairperson of the municipal council. The following people have held this position:

- 1916–1917: Anstein Eiken
- 1917–1922: Aasulv Olsen Bryggesaa (V)
- 1922–1925: Anstein Eiken
- 1925–1928: Aanen Haaberg
- 1928–1931: Lars Thorsland
- 1931–1932: Ole O. Scheie
- 1932–1937: Aanen S. Rossevatn
- 1937–1941: Pål Eiken (Bp)
- 1941–1945: Aanen Haaberg
- 1945–1949: Olav Hauge
- 1950–1959: Knut O. Vatne
- 1959–1962: Jon Eikås

== See also ==
- List of former municipalities of Norway
