= Snartemo Station =

Railway station in Hægebostad, Norway

Snartemo
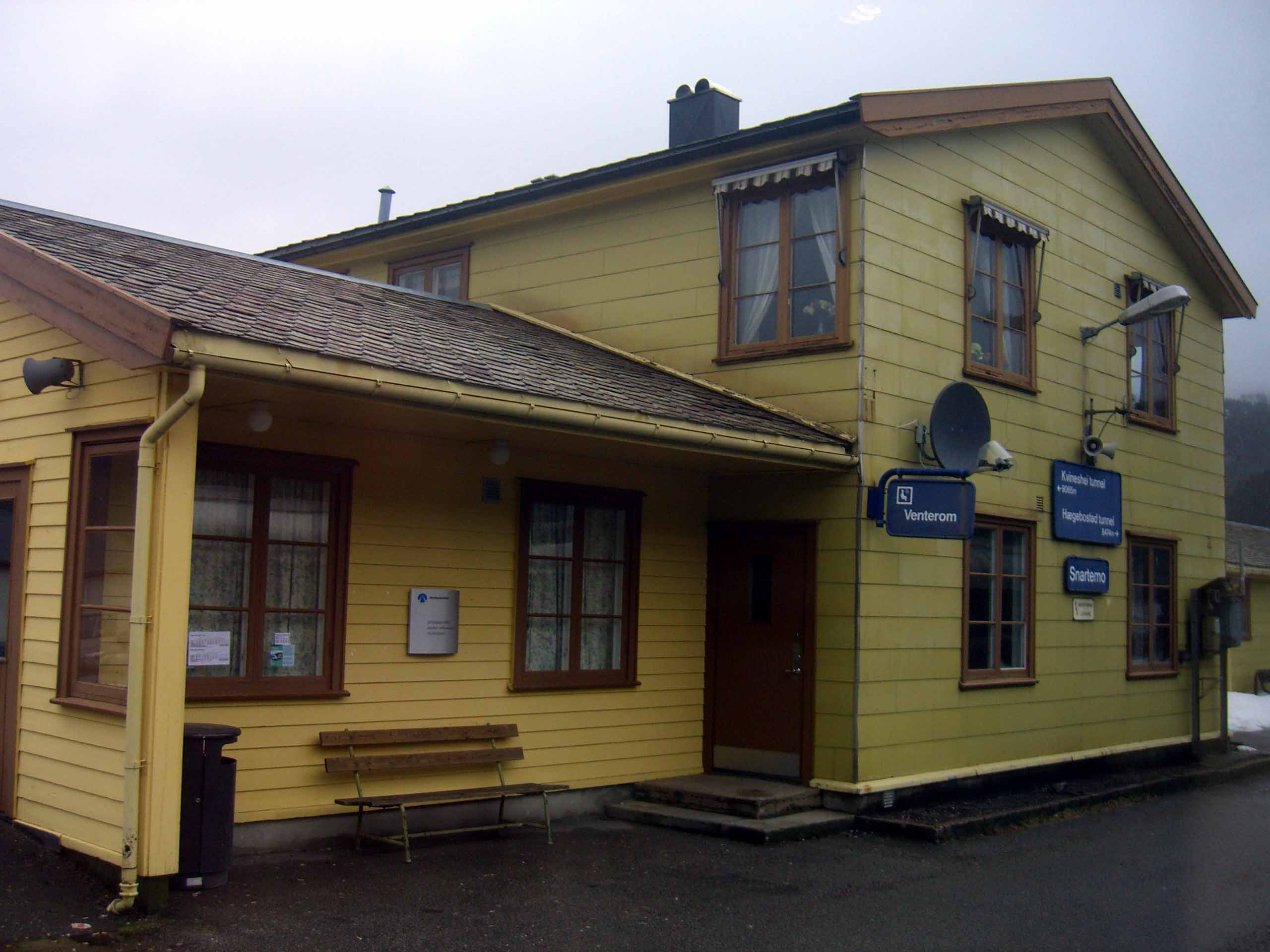

General information
- Location: Snartemo, Hægebostad Municipality; Norway
- Coordinates: 58°19′53″N 7°12′40″E
- Elevation: 151.6 m (497 ft) AMSL
- Owner: Bane NOR
- Operator: Go-Ahead Norge
- Line: Sørlandet Line
- Distance: 428.85 km (266.48 mi)
- Platforms: 2
- Tracks: 2

Construction
- Architect: Gudmund Hoel

Other information
- Station code: SNA

History
- Opened: 17 December 1943

Passengers
- 30,600 (annually)
Location
- Location within Agder

Snartemo Station (Norwegian: Snartemo stasjon) is a railway station of the Sørlandet Line situated in the village of Snartemo in Hægebostad Municipality in Agder county, Norway. Located 428.85 kilometers (266.48 mi) from Oslo Central Station, the station is situated on a 950-meter (3,120 ft) embankment between the Hægebostad Tunnel and the Kvineshei Tunnel.

Snartemo is served by long-distance trains operated by Go-Ahead Norge. In addition to intercity services to Oslo and Stavanger, the eight daily trains in each direction serve as a commuter link to Kristiansand. The station features two side platforms and a station building designed by Gudmund Hoel.

The station was opened on 17 December 1943 as part of the segment of the Sørlandet Line between Kristiansand and Sira. The line past the station was electrified from 18 February 1944 and the station automated in 1969. The station has been unstaffed since 1997. It received a renovation and new platform in 2009. Snartemo had 30,600 passengers in 2008.

== History ==
Work on the Sørlandet Line through Hægebostad commenced in 1934 with work on the Hægebostad Tunnel. Unlike some of the other tunnels on the line, it was built by hand. The Kvineshei tunnel was drilled with machines, and these took over the last work on the Hægebostad Tunnel. The earthwork from the tunnels was used to build an embankment through Lyngdalen at Snartemo, on which the line and station was placed.

Snartemo Station was built during the Second World War under the German-administrated expansion of the Sørlandet Line west of Kristiansand. The station building was completed in 1942. It was originally proposed to be named Hægebostad, but this was changed to Snartemo. Irregular revenue traffic commenced on the line on 17 December 1943 and the station became operative from the same day. Electric traction was introduced on 18 February 1944, ahead of ordinary traffic commencing on 1 March 1944.

The station building annex was extended in 1964 to make way for a restaurant. The former telegraph room was converted to a kitchen and parts of the extension were converted to a staff room. An interlocking system became operational on 17 July 1969, allowing the station to become remotely controlled from 19 August 1969. The technical room for the interlocking was installed in the basement. The station retained ticket sales and in 1981 the staff room was renovated. The station became unstaffed from 1 February 1997.

The short platforms have caused the Norwegian Railway Authority to demand that they be lengthened with 2019, or the station closed. The National Rail Administration determined in 2009 that Snartesmo would be one of eighteen prioritized stations which would have their platforms lengthened and heightened the same year. The work was completed in early 2010.

== Facilities ==
Snartemo Station is a station on the Sørlandet Line, located 428.85 kilometers (266.48 mi) from Oslo Central Station at an elevation of 151.6 meters (497 ft) above mean sea level. The line runs through the valley on an embankment, about 950 meters (3,120 ft) long, about 4 meters (13 ft) tall and up to 100 meters (330 ft) wide. Just west of the station there is a 59-meter-long (194 ft) bridge across the river Lygna. The embankment runs between the Hægebostad Tunnel to the east and Kvineshei Tunnel to the west. These tunnels are 8,474 meters (27,802 ft) and 9,065 meters (29,741 ft) in length, respectively, and the fifth and fourth-longest railway tunnels on the railway network in Norway.

The station features a 474-meter (1,555 ft) passing loop. There is a main side platform serving track 1, which is 220 meters (720 ft) long and 76 centimeters (30 in) tall, and a 155-meter (509 ft) long and 62-meter (203 ft) long and 25-centimeter (9.8 in) tall island platform serving track 2. Most trains stop at track 1, and only when trains meet at Snartemo is track 2 in use.

Like the other stations along the Sørlandet Line, the station building received a standardized design. It was built in the overall Neoclassical architecture style adapted in the 1920s. By the 1940s the designs had been altered to include elements of functionalism. The station was designed by Gudmund Hoel at NSB Arkitektkontor. The yellow 210 square meters (2,300 sq ft) building is wooden with a concrete foundation. It has siding in asbestos cement and a gable roof. The building consists of a main section, where the lower story originally featured a ticketing and waiting room, and an upper story with the station master's residence. Originally there was a gabled annex situated perpendicular to the main section. Since 1964 this has been lengthened and a second annex is located on the other side of the main section. The annex, which has wooden siding, was allocated cargo handling and a restaurant.

The station complex included two additional 70-square-kilometer (27 sq mi) residences and six various sheds and garages, the largest of which was a 98-square-kilometer (38 sq mi) tractor garage. Today the station building is universally accessible and features a waiting room and a washroom, open around the clock except from 21:00 on Saturday to 07:00 on Sunday. There is free parking for 30 cars at the station.

== Services ==
The station is served by long-distance trains operated by Go-Ahead, counting eight daily services on weekdays, including a night train service. These operate from Oslo via Kristiansand to Stavanger. Snartemo is located within the outer catchment area for commuting to Kristiansand. The train uses fifty minutes to Kristiansand Station. This is less than half the time used to drive, which is further hampered by congestion during rush-hour. The station had 30,600 annual passengers in 2008.

Snartemo is the only railway station in Hægebostad Municipality, and is the catchment area for Hægebostad Municipality, Lyngdal Municipality and Farsund Municipality. Agder Kollektivtrafikk operates a feeder service from Farsund and Lyngdal in connection with train services. There is a similar service northwards to Eiken. The routes must be ordered two hours in advance.

| Preceding station | Express trains | Following station |
|---|---|---|
| Storekvina towards Stavanger | F5 | Audnedal towards Oslo S |
