= Kvås Municipality =

Former municipality in Vest-Agder, Norway

Kvås Municipality Kvås herad
- Former municipality
- Kvaas herred (historic name)
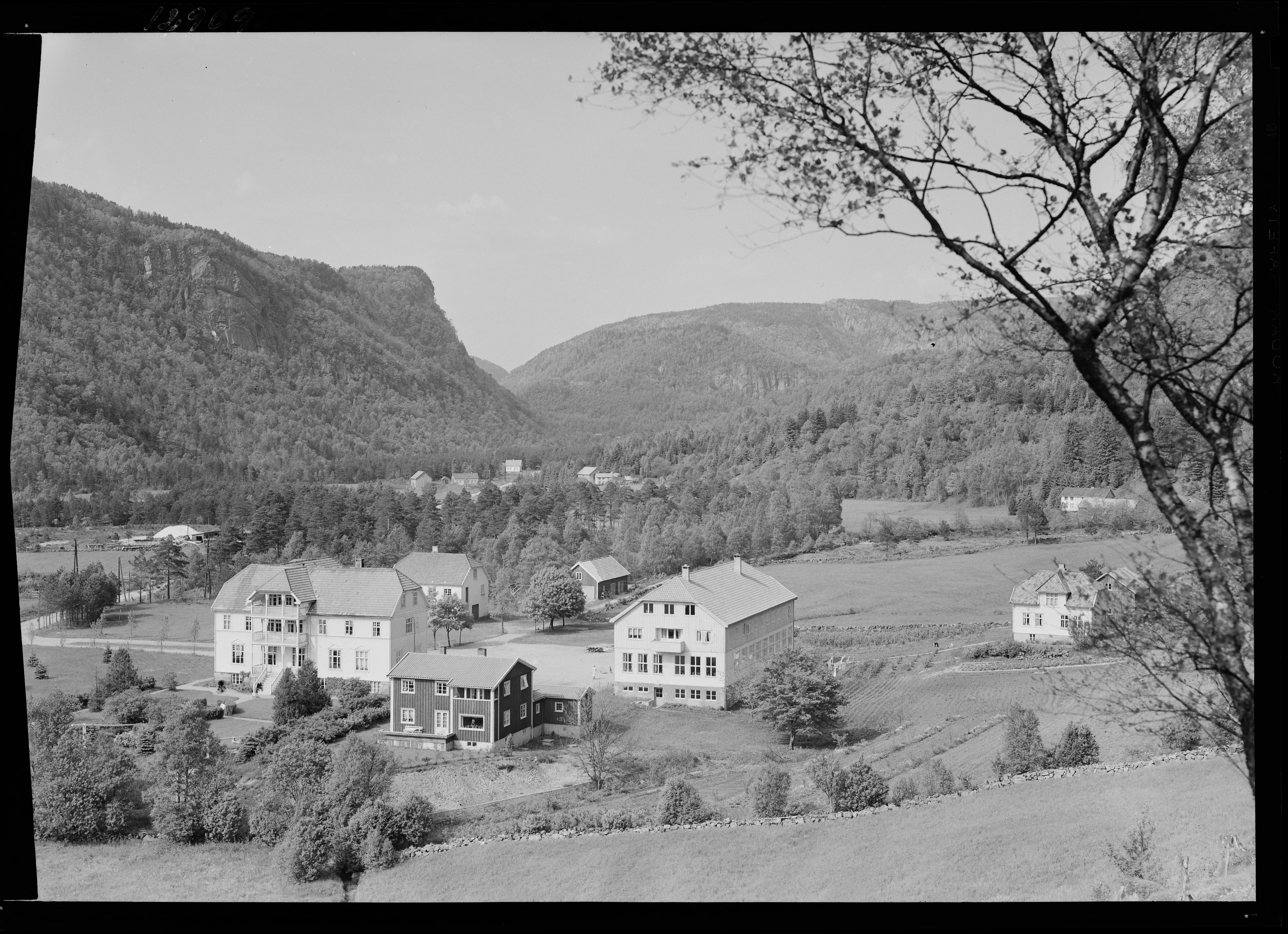
- View of a Kvås farm (1953)

- Vest-Agder within Norway

- Kvås within Vest-Agder
- Coordinates: 58°15′43″N 07°11′58″E
- Country: Norway
- County: Vest-Agder
- District: Lister
- Established: 1 Jan 1909
  - Preceded by: Lyngdal Municipality
- Disestablished: 1 Jan 1963
  - Succeeded by: Lyngdal Municipality
- Administrative centre: Kvås

Area (upon dissolution)
  - Total: 116.4 km^{2} (44.9 sq mi)
  - Rank: #496 in Norway
- Highest elevation: 463 m (1,519 ft)

Population (1962)
  - Total: 485
  - Rank: #698 in Norway
  - Density: 4.2/km^{2} (11/sq mi)
  - Change (10 years): ▼ −15.8%

Official language
  - Norwegian form: Nynorsk
- Time zone: UTC+01:00 (CET)
  - Summer (DST): UTC+02:00 (CEST)
- ISO 3166 code: NO-1033

Kvås is a former municipality in the old Vest-Agder county, Norway. The 116.4-square-kilometre (44.9 sq mi) municipality existed from 1909 until its dissolution in 1963. The area is now part of Lyngdal Municipality in the traditional district of Lister in Agder county. The administrative centre was the village of Kvås where Kvås Church is located. Other villages in Kvås Municipality included Birkeland and Moi.

Prior to its dissolution in 1963, the 116.4-square-kilometre (44.9 sq mi) municipality was the 496th largest by area out of the 705 municipalities in Norway. Kvås Municipality was the 698th most populous municipality in Norway with a population of about 485. The municipality's population density was 4.2 inhabitants per square kilometre (11/sq mi) and its population had decreased by 15.8% over the previous 10-year period.

== General information ==
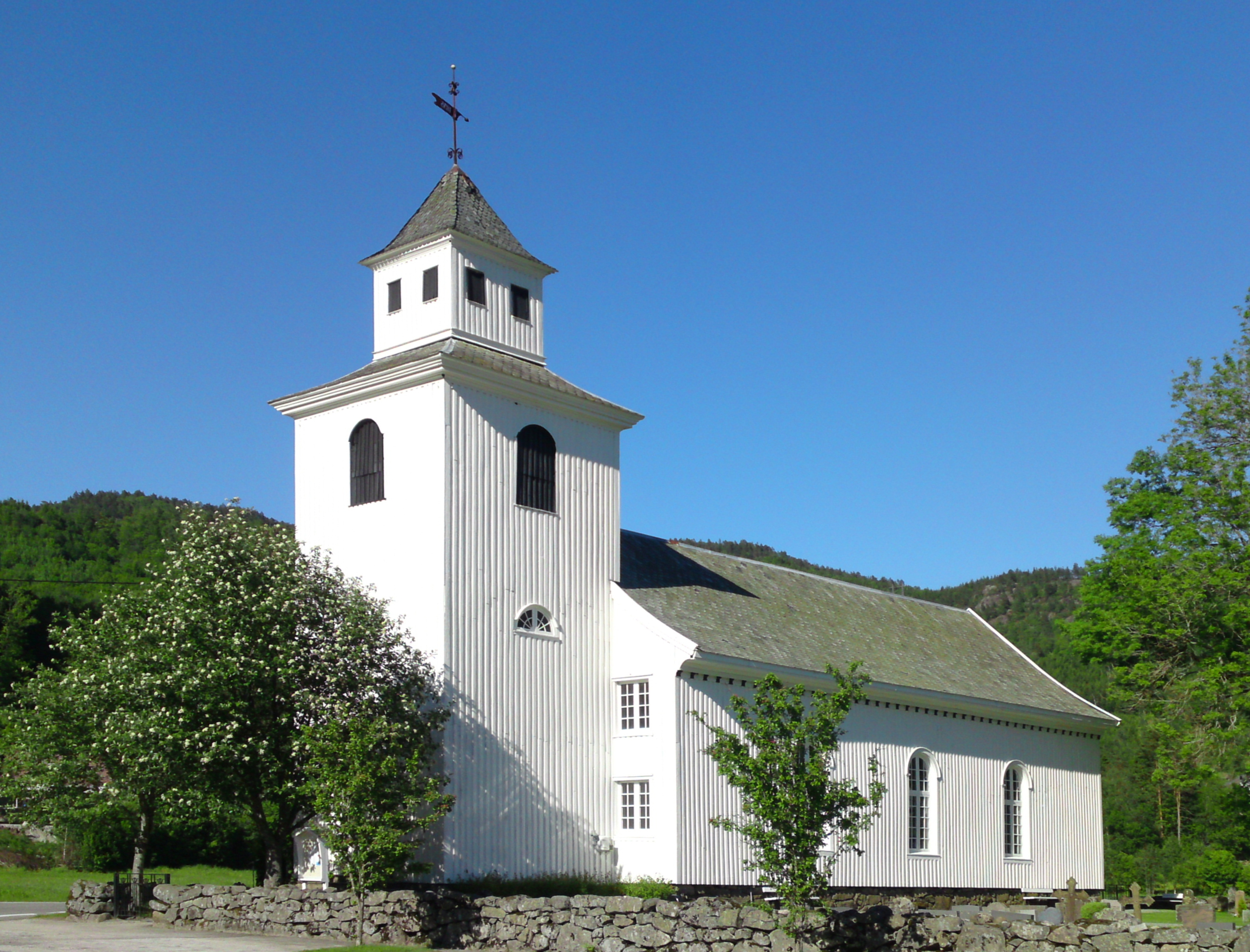
Kvås Church

The municipality of Kvaas (later spelled Kvås) was established on 1 January 1909 when the old Lyngdal Municipality was divided into three municipalities:

- the southern coastal area (population: 1,263) became the new Austad Municipality
- the northern area (population: 736) became the new Kvaas Municipality
- the central area (population: 2,698) continued as a smaller Lyngdal Municipality

During the 1960s, there were many municipal mergers across Norway due to the work of the Schei Committee. On 1 January 1963, Kvås Municipality was dissolved and the following areas were merged to form a new, larger Lyngdal Municipality:

- all of Lyngdal Municipality (population: 2,916)
- all of Austad Municipality (population: 608)
- all of Kvås Municipality (population: 493)
- the Gitlevåg area of Spangereid Municipality (population: 103)

=== Name ===
The municipality (originally the parish) is named after the old Kvaas farm (Old Norse: Kváss) since the first Kvås Church was built there. The meaning of the name is uncertain. One possibility is that it comes from the word kvos which means "valley" or "hollow". Prior to the 1917 Norwegian language reform law, the name was spelled with the digraph "aa", and after this reform, the letter å was used instead.

=== Churches ===
The Church of Norway had one parish (sokn) within Kvås Municipality. At the time of the municipal dissolution, it was part of the Lyngdal prestegjeld and the Lister prosti (deanery) in the Diocese of Agder.

Churches in Kvås Municipality
Parish (sokn)	Church name	Location of the church	Year built
Kvås	Kvås Church	Kvås	1836

== Geography ==
The highest point in the municipality was the 463-metre (1,519 ft) tall mountain Titlandsheia. Hægebostad Municipality was located to the north, Konsmo Municipality was located to the east, Vigmostad Municipality was located to the southeast, Lyngdal Municipality was located to the south, and Kvinesdal Municipality was located to the west.

== Government ==
While it existed, Kvås Municipality was responsible for primary education (through 10th grade), outpatient health services, senior citizen services, welfare and other social services, zoning, economic development, and municipal roads and utilities. The municipality was governed by a municipal council of directly elected representatives. The mayor was indirectly elected by a vote of the municipal council. The municipality was under the jurisdiction of the Lyngdal District Court and the Agder Court of Appeal.

=== Municipal council ===
The municipal council (Heradsstyre) of Kvås Municipality was made up of 13 representatives that were elected to four year terms. The tables below show the historical composition of the council by political party.

Kvås heradsstyre 1959–1962
Party name (in Nynorsk)	Number of representatives
Labour Party (Arbeidarpartiet)	1
Conservative Party (Høgre)	3
Centre Party (Senterpartiet)	8
Liberal Party (Venstre)	1
Total number of members:	13
Note: On 1 January 1963, Kvås Municipality became part of Lyngdal Municipality.

Kvås heradsstyre 1955–1959
Party name (in Nynorsk)	Number of representatives
Labour Party (Arbeidarpartiet)	1
Conservative Party (Høgre)	3
Farmers' Party (Bondepartiet)	7
Liberal Party (Venstre)	2
Total number of members:	13

Kvås heradsstyre 1951–1955
Party name (in Nynorsk)	Number of representatives
Labour Party (Arbeidarpartiet)	1
Conservative Party (Høgre)	2
Farmers' Party (Bondepartiet)	8
Liberal Party (Venstre)	1
Total number of members:	12

Kvås heradsstyre 1947–1951
Party name (in Nynorsk)	Number of representatives
Labour Party (Arbeidarpartiet)	1
Conservative Party (Høgre)	3
Farmers' Party (Bondepartiet)	7
Joint list of the Liberal Party (Venstre) and the Radical People's Party (Radikale Folkepartiet)	1
Total number of members:	12

Kvås heradsstyre 1945–1947
Party name (in Nynorsk)	Number of representatives
Local List(s) (Lokale lister)	12
Total number of members:	12

Kvås heradsstyre 1937–1941*
Party name (in Nynorsk)	Number of representatives
Local List(s) (Lokale lister)	12
Total number of members:	12
Note: Due to the German occupation of Norway during World War II, no elections were held for new municipal councils until after the war ended in 1945.

=== Mayors ===
The mayor (Nynorsk: ordførar) of Kvås Municipality was the political leader of the municipality and the chairperson of the municipal council. The following people have held this position:

- 1909–1910: Andreas Olsen Vegge
- 1911–1916: Kristian Olsen Kvaas
- 1917–1919: Andreas Olsen Vegge
- 1920–1925: Kristian Larsen Kvås
- 1926–1928: Sakarias T. Høyland
- 1929–1934: Tobias Vegge
- 1935–1937: Johannes G. Høiland
- 1938–1945: Sakarias T. Høyland
- 1946–1947: Tobias Vegge
- 1948–1951: Sakarias T. Høyland
- 1952–1955: Tobias Vegge
- 1955–1959: Einar Kjørkleiv
- 1959–1962: Torleif Gusa

== See also ==
- List of former municipalities of Norway
