= Audnedal =

Audnedal may refer to:

== Places ==
- Audnedalen, a valley in Agder county, Norway
- Audnedal station, a railway station in Lyngdal Municipality in Agder county, Norway
- Audnedal Municipality, a former municipality in the old Vest-Agder county, Norway
- Undal Municipality (an old spelling of Audnedal), a former municipality in the old Vest-Agder county, Norway
