= Haddeland =

Haddeland may refer to the following locations in Norway:

- Haddeland, Agder, a village in Hægebostad Municipality in Agder county
- Haddeland, Telemark, a village in Vinje Municipality in Telemark county

== See also ==
- Hadeland
