= Wenaas =

Wenaas is a surname. Notable people with the surname include:

- Johan Arnt Wenaas (1941–2015), Norwegian priest
- Ronald Wenaas (born 1968), Norwegian footballer
