= Snartemo =

Village in Hægebostad Municipality, Norway

- Village
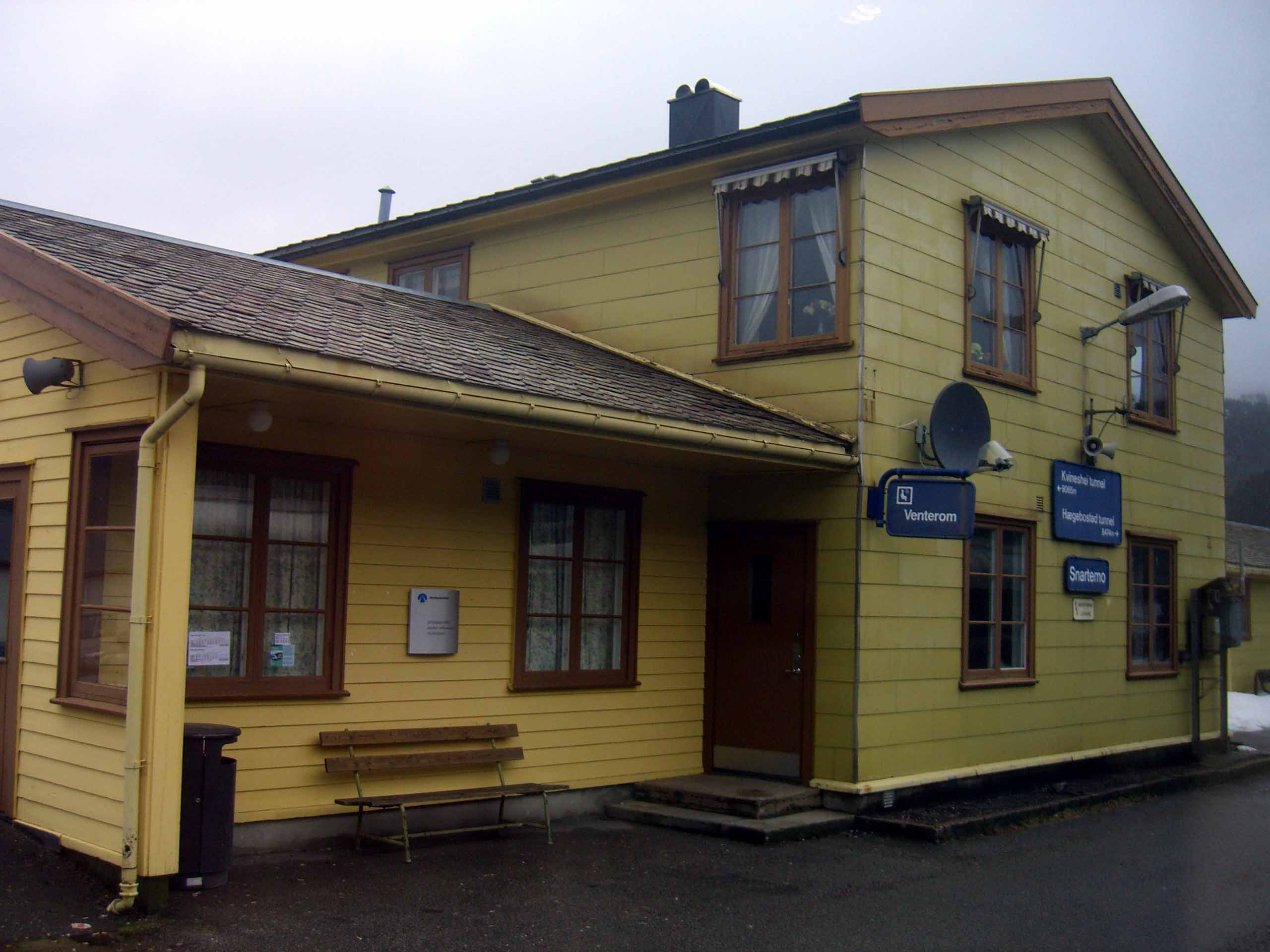
- View of the village railway station
- Interactive map of Snartemo
- Coordinates: 58.33313°N 7.21252°E
- Country: Norway
- Region: Southern Norway
- County: Agder
- District: Lister
- Municipality: Hægebostad Municipality
- Elevation: 145 m (476 ft)
- Time zone: UTC+01:00 (CET)
  - Summer (DST): UTC+02:00 (CEST)
- Post Code: 4590 Snartemo

Snartemo is a village in Hægebostad Municipality in Agder county, Norway. The village is located in the fairly narrow Lyngdalen valley along the river Lygna, about 7 kilometres (4.3 mi) south of the municipal centre of Tingvatn. The village of Snartemo had a population of 118 in 2015. There are historic archeological sites located in Snartemo. Hægebostad Church, built in 1844, is located in Snartemo.

The village is served by Snartemo Station on the Sørlandet Line, the only railway station in the municipality. The station is located in a valley between the Hægebostad Tunnel to the east and Kvineshei Tunnel to the west. These tunnels are 8,474 meters (27,802 ft) and 9,065 meters (29,741 ft) length, respectively, and the fifth and fourth-longest railway tunnels on the railway network in Norway.
