= Skeie, Hægebostad =

Village in Hægebostad Municipality, Norway

Skeie Skeide
- Village
- Interactive map of Skeie
- Coordinates: 58.46156°N 7.23148°E
- Country: Norway
- Region: Southern Norway
- County: Agder
- District: Lister
- Municipality: Hægebostad Municipality

Area
  - Total: 0.39 km^{2} (0.15 sq mi)
- Elevation: 193 m (633 ft)

Population (2025)
  - Total: 233
  - Density: 597/km^{2} (1,550/sq mi)
- Time zone: UTC+01:00 (CET)
  - Summer (DST): UTC+02:00 (CEST)
- Post Code: 4596 Eiken

Skeie is a village in Hægebostad Municipality in Agder county, Norway. The village is located on the east side of the lake Lygne, about 3 kilometres (1.9 mi) south of the village of Eiken and about 7 kilometres (4.3 mi) north of the village of Tingvatn. The village has some business and commercial operations.

The 0.39-square-kilometre (96-acre) village has a population (2025) of 233 and a population density of 597 inhabitants per square kilometre (1,550/sq mi).
