= Aasulv Olsen Bryggesaa =

Norwegian politician (1856–1922)

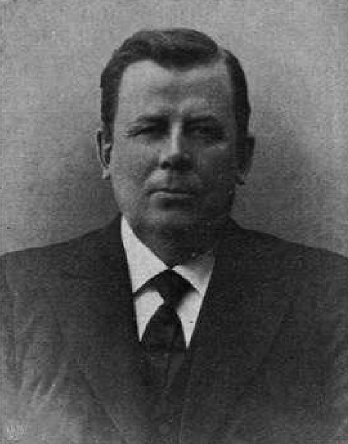

Minister of Education and Church Affairs
- In office 31 January 1913 – 26 October 1915
- Prime Minister: Gunnar Knudsen
- Preceded by: Edvard Liljedahl
- Succeeded by: Jørgen Løvland

Member of the Norwegian Parliament
- In office 1 January 1906 – 31 December 1915
- Constituency: Lyngdal Municipality
- In office 1 January 1900 – 1 January 1906
- Constituency: Lister and Mandal

Personal details
- Born: Aasulv Olsen Bryggesaa; 25 April 1856 Hægebostad Municipality, Lister og Mandal, United Kingdoms of Sweden and Norway
- Died: 3 April 1922 (aged 65) Hægebostad Municipality, Vest-Agder, Norway
- Party: Liberal
- Spouse: Inger Maria Aanonsdatter Hobbesland (m. 1878)
- Children: Berte

Aasulv Olsen Bryggesaa (25 April 1856 – 3 April 1922) was a Norwegian politician for the Liberal Party.

He was elected to the Norwegian Parliament from the constituency Lister og Mandal amt in 1900, and was re-elected on four consecutive occasions. When the second cabinet Knudsen assumed office on 31 January 1913, Bryggesaa was appointed Minister of Education and Church Affairs. He left cabinet on 25 October 1915.

Born in Eiken, he was a member of the municipal council of Hægebostad Municipality and served as mayor for some time. For an unknown period he was a member of the county committee, a forerunner of the county council.

He took a teacher's education in Holt Municipality in 1877. From 1878 he worked on the family farm Bryggesaa in Eiken. He also worked as a teacher in Hægebostad for six years. In addition he served on various public committees, both locally and nationally.

Political offices
Preceded by Edvard Liljedahl	Norwegian Minister of Education and Church Affairs; 1913–1915	Succeeded by Jørgen Løvland
