= Haddeland, Agder =

Village in Hægebostad Municipality, Norway

Haddeland
- Village
- Interactive map of Haddeland
- Coordinates: 58.51032°N 7.12282°E
- Country: Norway
- Region: Southern Norway
- County: Agder
- District: Lister
- Municipality: Hægebostad Municipality
- Elevation: 287 m (942 ft)
- Time zone: UTC+01:00 (CET)
  - Summer (DST): UTC+02:00 (CEST)
- Post Code: 4596 Eiken

Haddeland is a village in Hægebostad Municipality in Agder county, Norway. The village is located about 7 kilometres (4.3 mi) northwest of the village of Eiken. The village of Fjotland lies about 8 kilometres (5.0 mi) to the west across the hills in the neighboring Kvinesdal Municipality. Haddeland sits along the shores of the river Storåni, a northern branch of the river Lygna.
