= Hægebostad Church =

Church in Agder, Norway

- Hægebostad kirke
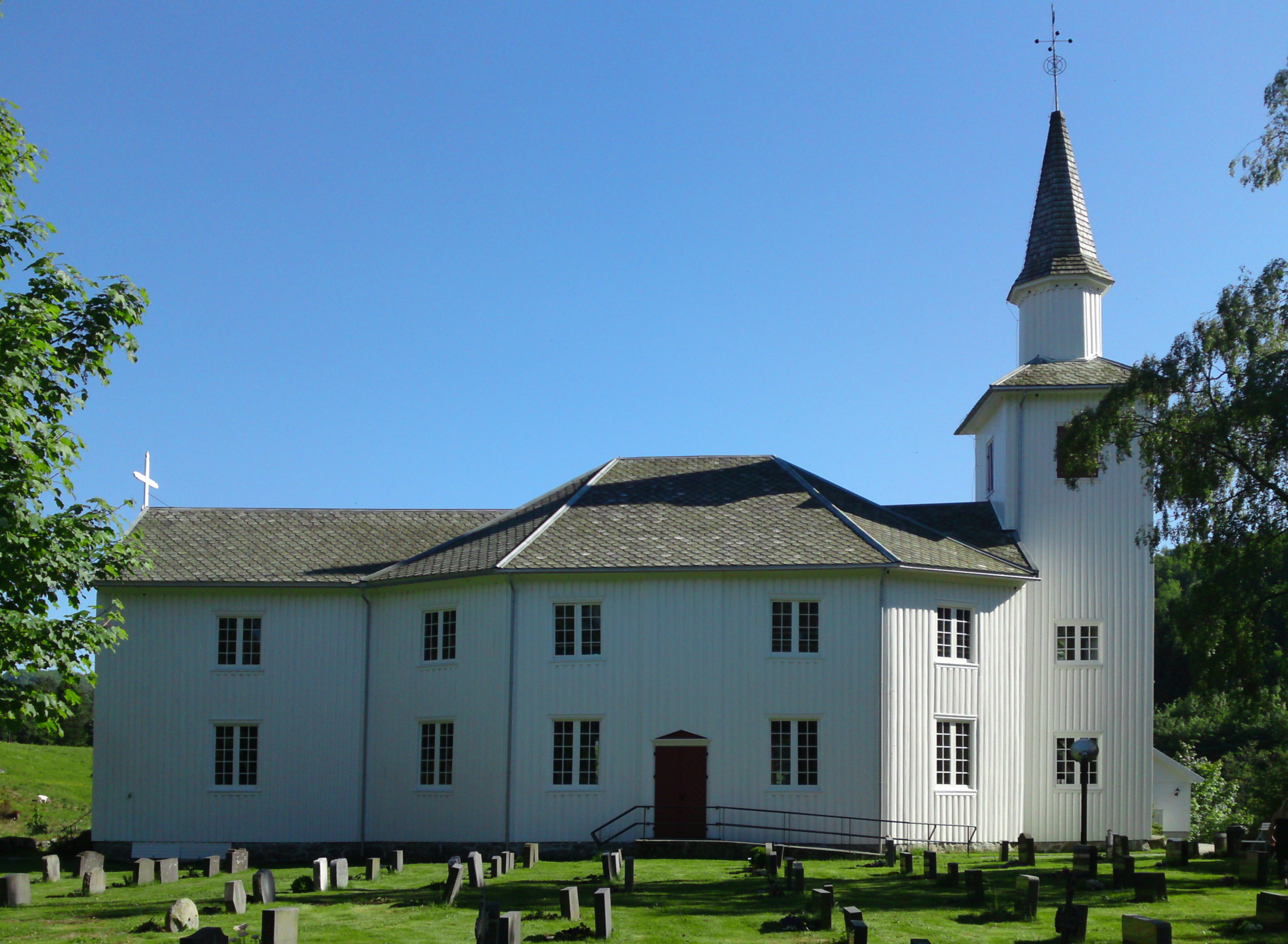
- View of the church
- Hægebostad Church
- 58.340307°N 07.205896°E
- Location: Hægebostad Municipality, Agder
- Country: Norway
- Denomination: Church of Norway
- Churchmanship: Evangelical Lutheran

History
- Status: Parish church
- Founded: Middle Ages
- Consecrated: 1844

Architecture
- Functional status: Active
- Architect(s): Nils Christian Hald and Christian H. Grosch
- Architectural type: Octagonal
- Completed: 1844; 182 years ago

Specifications
- Capacity: 450
- Materials: Wood

Administration
- Diocese: Agder og Telemark
- Deanery: Lister og Mandal prosti
- Parish: Hægebostad
- Norwegian Cultural Heritage Site
- Type: Church
- Status: Listed
- ID: 84687

Hægebostad Church (Norwegian: Hægebostad kirke) is a parish church of the Church of Norway in Hægebostad Municipality in Agder county, Norway. It is located in the village of Snartemo. It is the church for the Hægebostad parish which is part of the Lister og Mandal prosti (deanery) in the Diocese of Agder og Telemark. The white, wooden church was built in a octagonal design in 1844 using plans drawn up by the parish priest Nils Christian Hald with some help from the national architect Christian H. Grosch. The church seats about 450 people.

== History ==
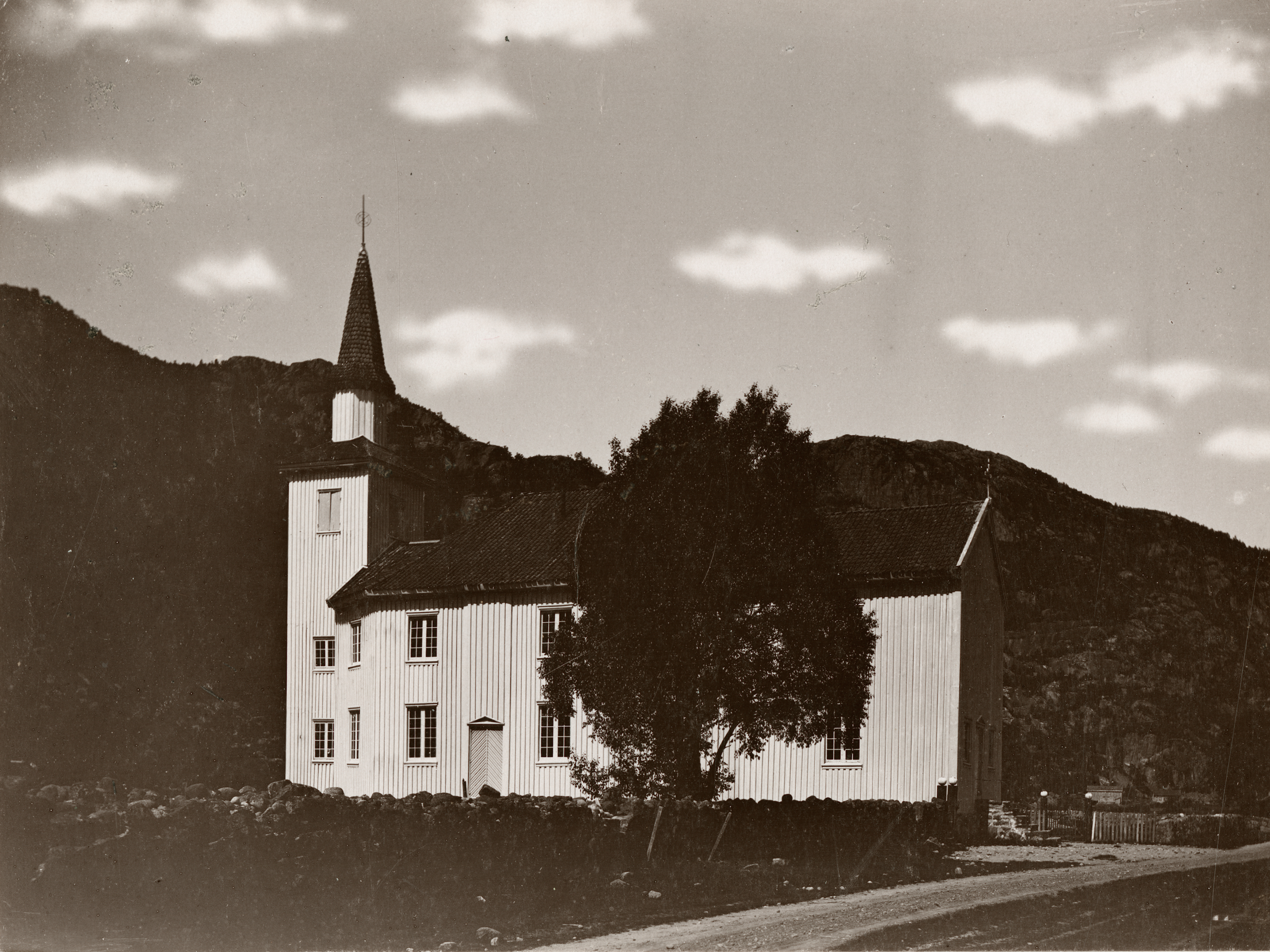
View of the church around the year 1900.

The earliest existing historical records of the church date back to the year 1445, but the church was not new at that time. That old church was likely a stave church. The medieval church was torn down in 1629 and replaced with a wooden long church. This timber-framed building had a small tower and small windows. It sat in a similar position to the location of the present-day church.

In 1814, this church served as an election church (Norwegian: valgkirke). Together with more than 300 other parish churches across Norway, it was a polling station for elections to the 1814 Norwegian Constituent Assembly which wrote the Constitution of Norway. This was Norway's first national elections. Each church parish was a constituency that elected people called "electors" who later met together in each county to elect the representatives for the assembly that was to meet at Eidsvoll Manor later that year.

By the 1840s, the church had become too small for the congregation, so a new church was constructed on the same site. Wood from the old church was reused in the new church which was completed in 1844. The new church had an octagonal design.

== See also ==
- List of churches in Agder og Telemark
