= Kvineshei Tunnel =

Railway tunnel in Agder, Norway

Kvineshei Tunnel Kvinesheitunnelen
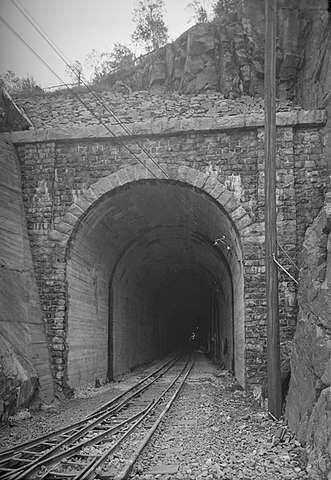
- Western entrance of the tunnel (1942)
- Interactive map of Kvineshei Tunnel; Kvinesheitunnelen

Overview
- Line: Sørlandet Line
- Location: Agder, Norway
- Coordinates: 58°20′08″N 7°08′33″E
- System: Norwegian railways
- Start: Snartemo Station
- End: Kvinesdalen

Operation
- Opened: 1943
- Owner: Jernbaneverket
- Operator: Statens vegvesen

Technical
- Length: 9,065 m (29,741 ft)
- No. of tracks: Single
- Track gauge: 1,435 mm (4 ft 8 1/2 in)
- Electrified: 15 kV 16.7 Hz AC

The Kvineshei Tunnel (Norwegian: Kvinesheitunnelen) is the fourth-longest railway tunnel in Norway at a length of 9,065 metres (5.633 mi). It is located in Agder county along the Sørlandet Line. The tunnel runs between Snartemo Station in the village of Snartemo in Hægebostad Municipality and the Kvinesdal valley about 5 kilometres (3.1 mi) northeast of Liknes in Kvinesdal Municipality.

The tunnel was opened in 1943 when the Sørlandet Line was extended to Moi Station. The 9,065-metre (29,741 ft) long tunnel includes a 9,020-metre (29,590 ft) long straight stretch, the longest straight stretch on the entire Norwegian railway network and about 5 metres (16 ft) longer than the one in Romeriksporten.
