= Lyngdalen =

Valley in Norway

Lyngdalen Lyngdal
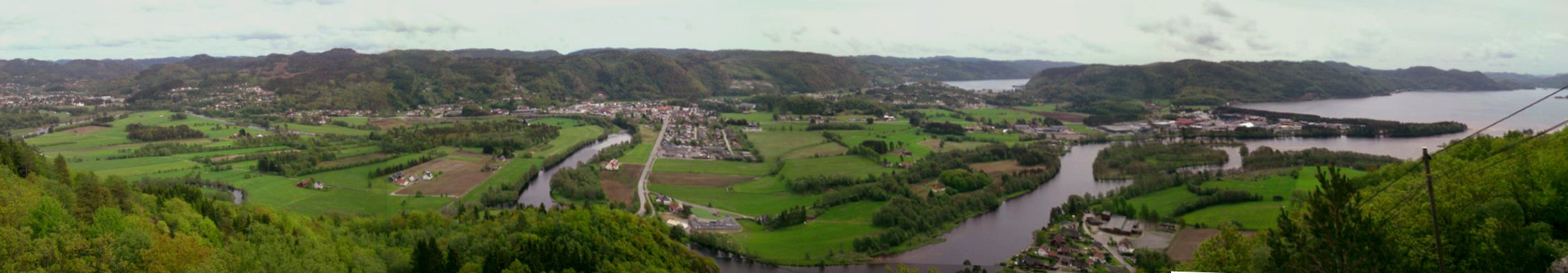
- View of the south end of the valley
- Length: 60 kilometres (37 mi) N-S

Geology
- Type: River valley

Geography
- Location: Agder, Norway
- Population centers: Lyngdal, Kvås, Snartemo, Tingvatn
- Coordinates: 58°18′57″N 07°13′05″E
- Rivers: Lygna

Location
- Interactive map of the valley

Lyngdalen or Lyngdal is a valley in Agder county, Norway. The 60-kilometre (37 mi) long valley runs north–south through Hægebostad Municipality and Lyngdal Municipality. The valley follows the river Lygna from the mountain plateaus in northern Hægebostad to the Lyngdalsfjorden, just south of the town of Lyngdal. The villages of Kvås, Snartemo, and Tingvatn are all located in the valley. The long, narrow lake Lygne is also located in the valley.
