= Kvås =

Village in Lyngdal Municipality, Norway

- Village
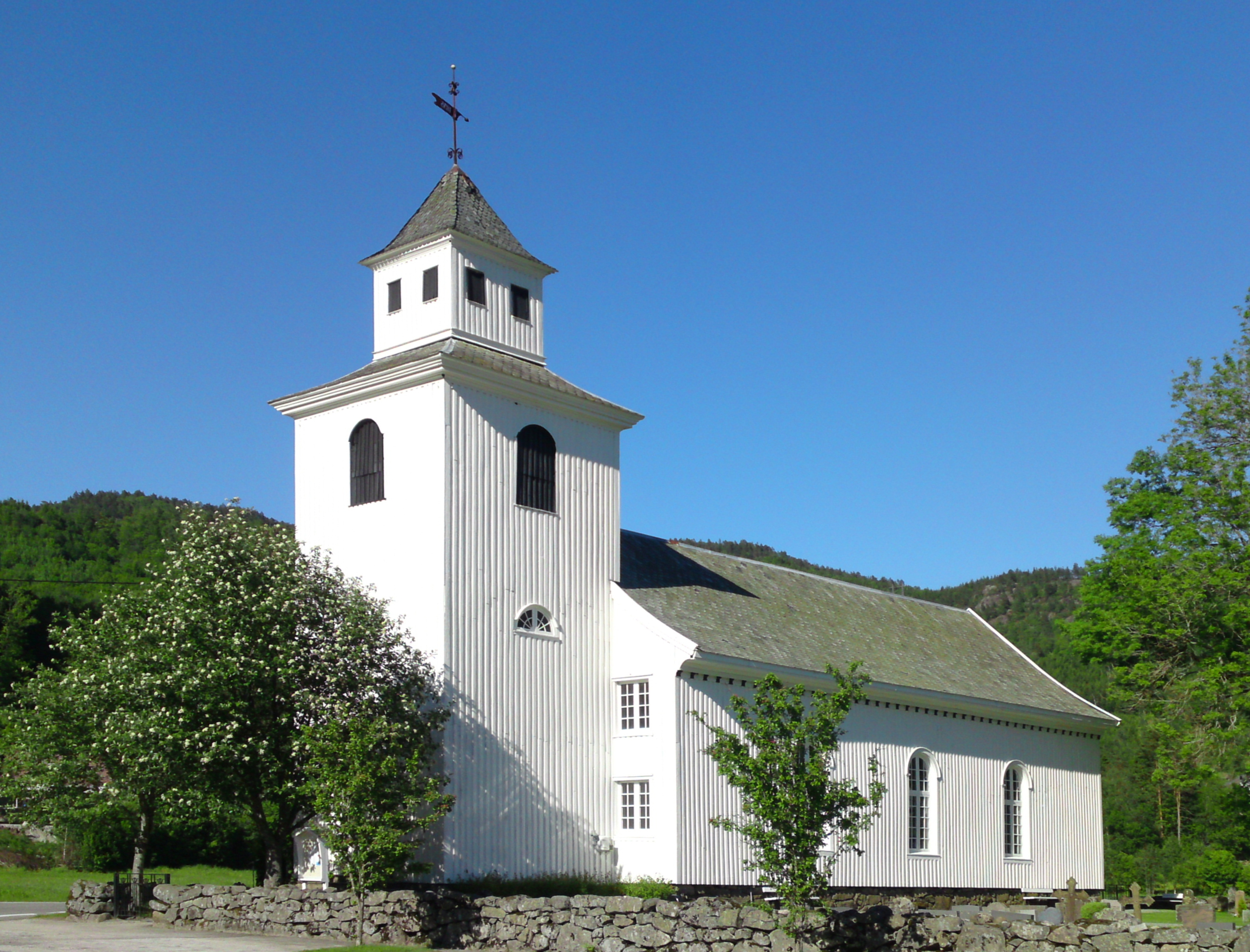
- View of the village church
- Interactive map of Kvås
- Coordinates: 58.26214°N 7.19766°E
- Country: Norway
- Region: Southern Norway
- County: Agder
- District: Lister
- Municipality: Lyngdal Municipality
- Elevation: 54 m (177 ft)
- Time zone: UTC+01:00 (CET)
  - Summer (DST): UTC+02:00 (CEST)
- Post Code: 4588 Kvås

Kvås is a village in Lyngdal Municipality in Agder county, Norway. The village is located in the Lyngdalen valley, along the river Lygna, about 16 kilometres (9.9 mi) northeast of the town of Lyngdal and about 10 kilometres (6.2 mi) west of the village of Konsmo. The Kvås Church lies at the center of the village.

== History ==
Kvås was the administrative centre of the old Kvås Municipality from 1909 until its dissolution in 1963.

=== Name ===
The village (originally the parish) is named after the old Kvås farm (Old Norse: Kváss), since that is where the Kvås Church is located. The meaning of the name probably refers to a "valley" or "hollow".
