= Hægebostad Tunnel =

Railway tunnel in Agder County, Norway

Hægebostad Tunnel Hægebostadtunnelen
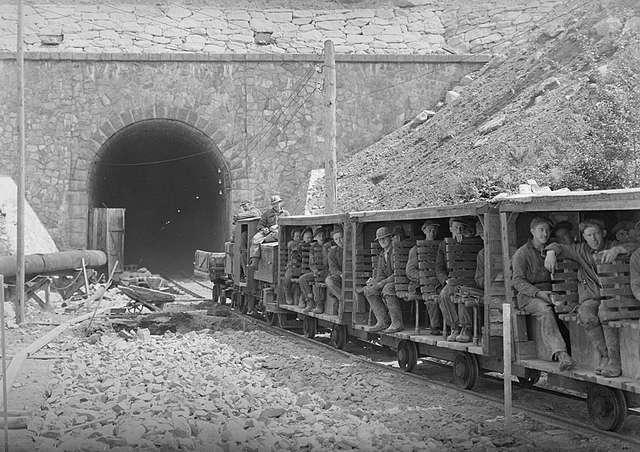
- View of the tunnel entrance during construction in 1942
- Interactive map of Hægebostad Tunnel; Hægebostadtunnelen

Overview
- Official name: Hægebostadtunnelen
- Line: Sørlandet Line
- Location: Agder, Norway
- Coordinates: 58°19′39″N 7°17′46″E
- Status: In use
- System: Norwegian railways
- Start: Audnedal Station
- End: Snartemo Station

Operation
- Opened: 1943
- Owner: Bane NOR
- Operator: Go-Ahead
- Traffic: Rail

Technical
- Line length: 8,474 m (27,802 ft)
- No. of tracks: Single
- Track gauge: 1,435 mm (4 ft 8 1/2 in)
- Electrified: 15 kV 16.7 Hz AC
- Grade: 0.2%

The Hægebostad Tunnel (Norwegian: Hægebostadtunnelen) is the fifth longest railway tunnel in Norway. It is located in Lyngdal Municipality and Hægebostad Municipality in Agder county. The 8.474-kilometre (5.265 mi) long tunnel runs between Audnedal Station and Snartemo Station on the Sørlandet Line. It was opened in 1943 when the Sørlandet Line was extended west all the way to Moi Station. The tunnel runs through the mountains virtually the entire distance between the stations of Audnedal and Snartemo. The tunnel has a 0.2% horizontal gradient and goes straight except for a curve at entrance on the Audnedal side.
