= Hægebostad Municipality =

Municipality in Agder, Norway

Hægebostad Municipality Hægebostad kommune
- Municipality
- Hegebostad herred (historic name)
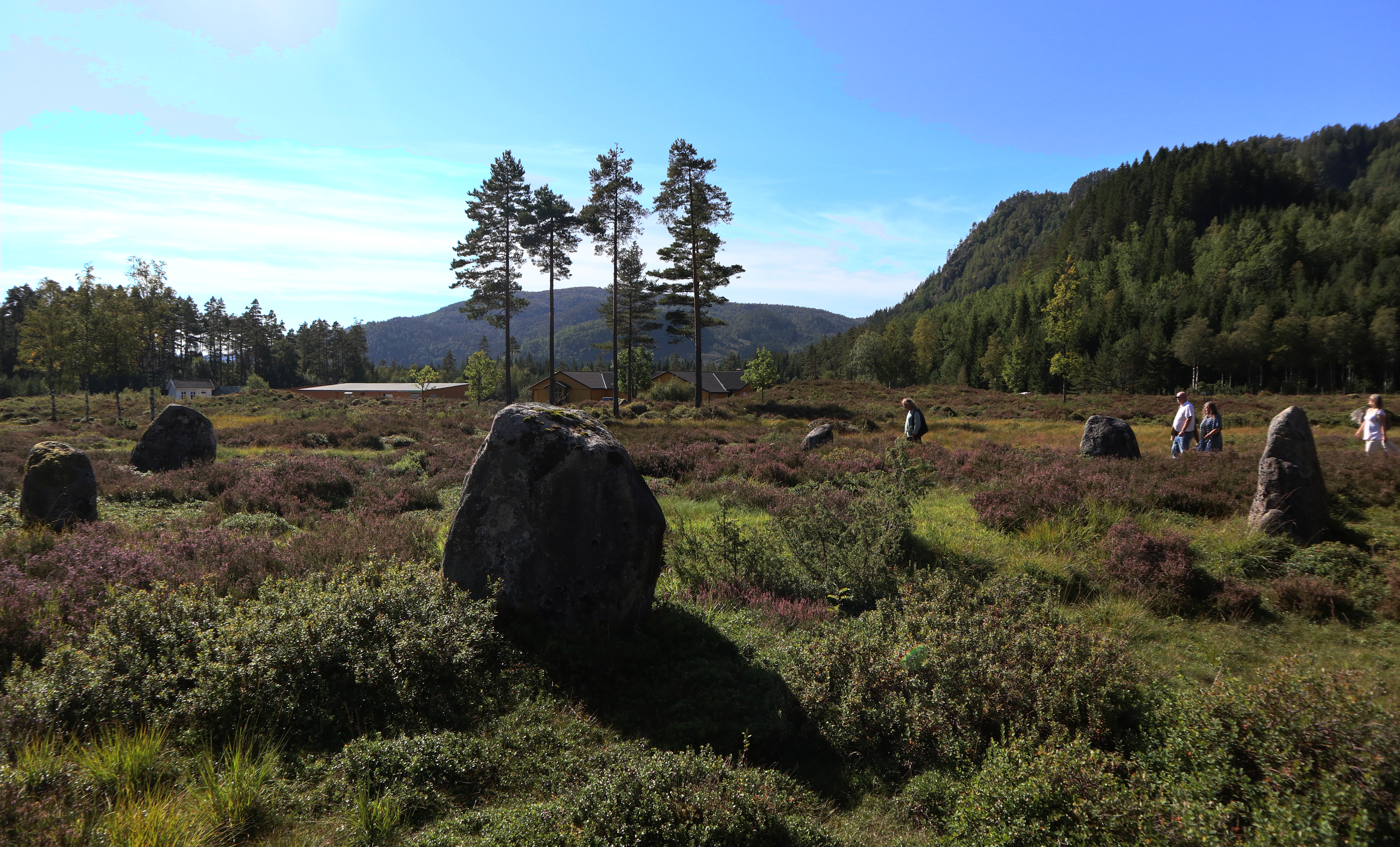
- View of the Tingvatn area in Hægebostad Municipality

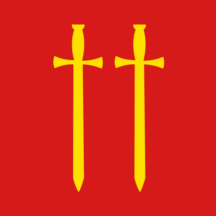
- Flag Coat of arms

- Agder within Norway

- Hægebostad within Agder
- Coordinates: 58°27′24″N 07°13′11″E
- Country: Norway
- County: Agder
- District: Lister
- Established: 1 Jan 1838
  - Created as: Formannskapsdistrikt
- Administrative centre: Tingvatn

Government
  - Mayor (2023): Jan Petter Gysland (H)

Area
  - Total: 461.32 km^{2} (178.12 sq mi)
  - Land: 424.27 km^{2} (163.81 sq mi)
  - Water: 37.05 km^{2} (14.31 sq mi) 8%
  - Rank: #214 in Norway
- Highest elevation: 966.2 m (3,170 ft)

Population (2026)
  - Total: 1,794
  - Rank: #297 in Norway
  - Density: 4.2/km^{2} (11/sq mi)
  - Change (10 years): ▲ +5.4%
- Demonym: Hægdøl

Official language
  - Norwegian form: Nynorsk
- Time zone: UTC+01:00 (CET)
  - Summer (DST): UTC+02:00 (CEST)
- ISO 3166 code: NO-4226
- Website: Official website

Hægebostad is a municipality in Agder county, Norway. It is located in the traditional district of Lister. The administrative centre of the municipality is the village of Tingvatn. Other villages in the municipality include Eiken, Haddeland, Skeie, and Snartemo. The municipality encompasses the northern end of the Lyngdalen valley which follows the river Lygna.

The Sørlandet Line railroad runs through the municipality from east to west, stopping at Snartemo Station in Snartemo. To get into and out of the valley in which Hægebostad is located, the trains must go through two of the longest railway tunnels in Norway: Hægebostad Tunnel and Kvineshei Tunnel.

The 461.32-square-kilometre (178.12 sq mi) municipality is the 214th largest by area out of the 357 municipalities in Norway. Hægebostad Municipality is the 297th most populous municipality in Norway with a population of 1,794. The municipality's population density is 4.2 inhabitants per square kilometre (11/sq mi) and its population has increased by 5.4% over the previous 10-year period.

Nine units of sheltered housing are under construction in Hægebostad (in 2022) after the previous ones were demolished.

== History ==
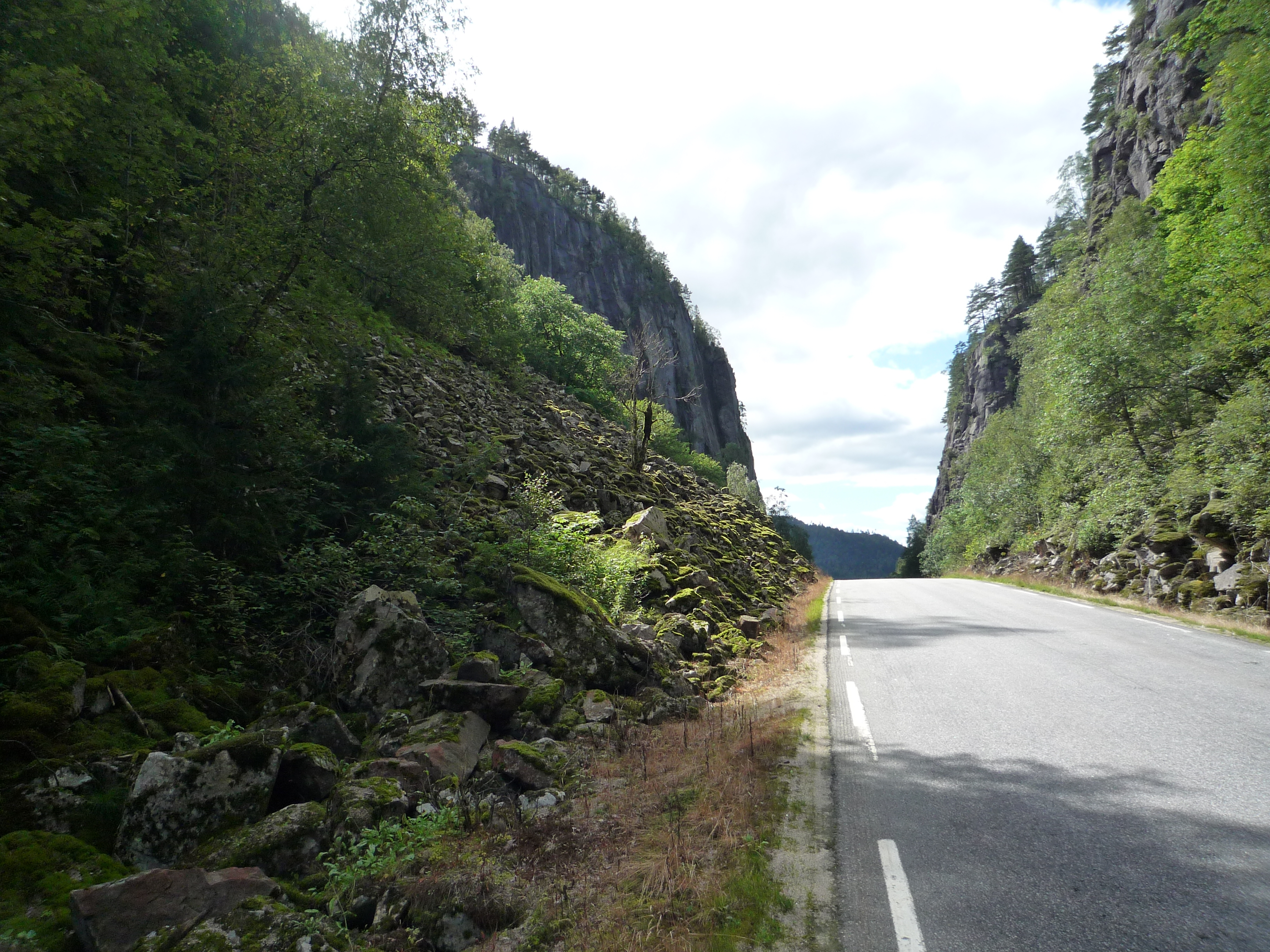
View of the Sveindal area

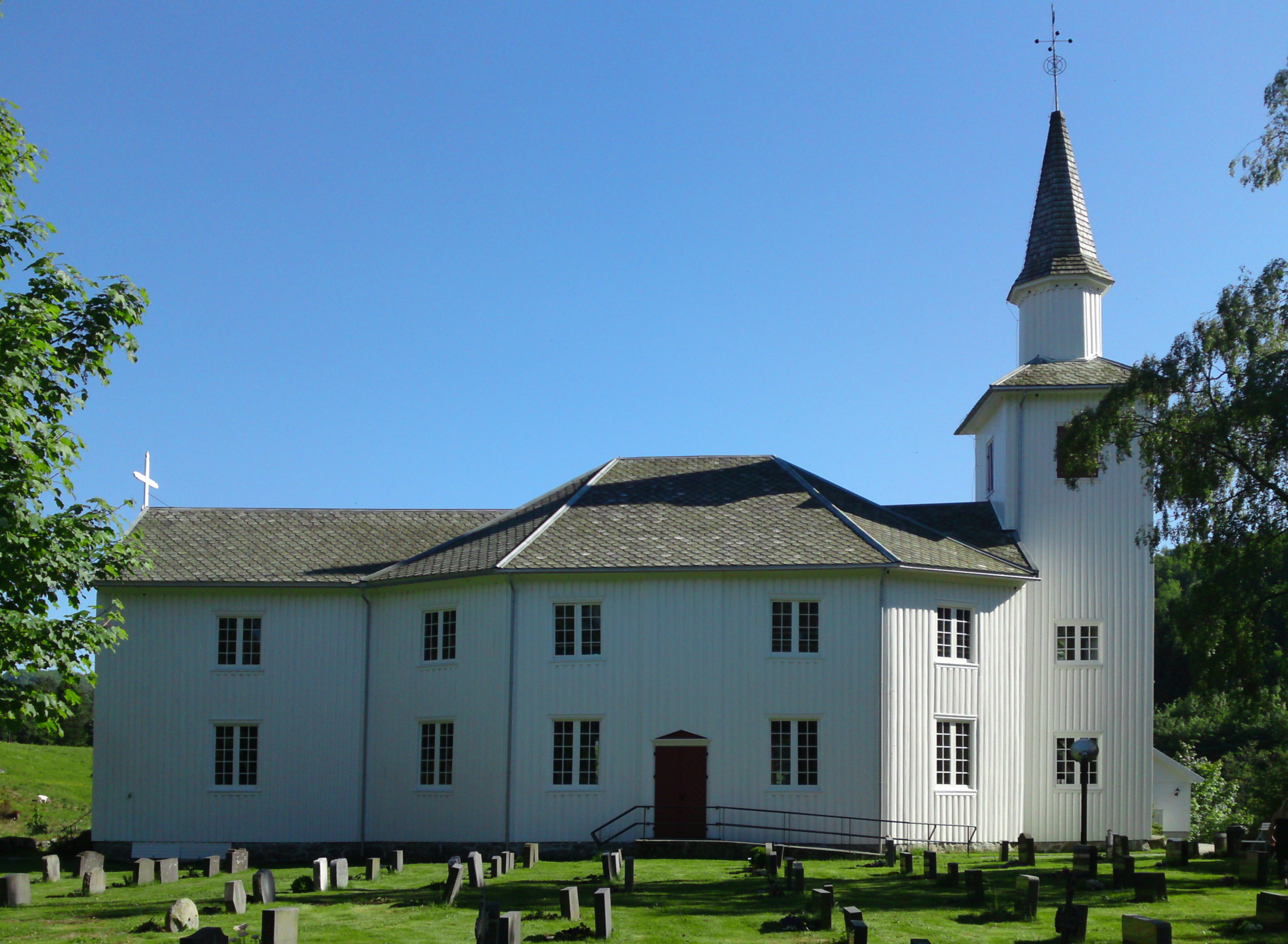
Hægebostad Church

The parish of Hægebostad was established as a municipality on 1 January 1838 (see formannskapsdistrikt law). On 1 January 1916 the large Hægebostad Municipality was divided into two separate municipalities: the northern district (population: 932) became the new Eiken Municipality and the southern district (population: 867) continued as a smaller Hægebostad Municipality.

During the 1960s, there were many municipal mergers across Norway due to the work of the Schei Committee. On 1 January 1963, Eiken Municipality (population: 784) was dissolved and merged (back) into Hægebostad Municipality. Prior to the merger, Hægebostad Municipality had 813 residents.

Historically, this municipality was part of the old Vest-Agder county. On 1 January 2020, the municipality became a part of the newly-formed Agder county (after Aust-Agder and Vest-Agder counties were merged).

=== Name ===
The municipality (originally the parish) is named after the old Hægebostad farm (Old Norse: Helgabólstaðir) since the first Hægebostad Church was built there. This farm is now on the north side of the village of Snartemo. The first element is helg- which means "holy". The last element is the plural form of bólstaðr which means "homestead" or "farm". Before 1889, the name was written Hegebostad.

=== Coat of arms ===
The coat of arms was granted on 4 April 1986. The official blazon is "Gules, two swords Or, points to the base" (Norwegian: På raud grunn to gull sverd med oddane ned). This means the arms have a red field (background) and the charge is two swords that are pointing downwards. The swords have a tincture of Or which means it is commonly colored yellow, but if it is made out of metal, then gold is used. The swords represent the two swords of Snartemo and Eiken dating from the 4th–6th century that were found in the municipality. The swords were highly decorated with silver and gold, but the ones on the arms are a more stylized heraldic design. The arms were designed by John Digernes. The municipal flag has the same design as the coat of arms.

== Geography ==
Hægebostad is an inland municipality, with Åseral Municipality to the northeast, Kvinesdal Municipality to the west, and Lyngdal Municipality to the south and east. The municipality covers the upper Lyngdalen valley from the mountains in the north, along the river Lygna to Lyngdal Municipality]] in the south. The lake Lygne lies in the central part of the municipality. The highest point in the municipality is the 966.2-metre (3,170 ft) tall mountain Oddevassheia in the northern part of the municipality.

=== Climate ===
Climate data for Skeie, near Eiken 1961-90
Month	Jan	Feb	Mar	Apr	May	Jun	Jul	Aug	Sep	Oct	Nov	Dec	Year
Daily mean °C (°F)	−2.3 (27.9)	−2.4 (27.7)	0.1 (32.2)	3.5 (38.3)	8.8 (47.8)	13.0 (55.4)	14.3 (57.7)	13.4 (56.1)	9.8 (49.6)	6.4 (43.5)	2.0 (35.6)	−1.1 (30.0)	5.5 (41.9)
Average precipitation mm (inches)	156 (6.1)	109 (4.3)	110 (4.3)	68 (2.7)	95 (3.7)	89 (3.5)	99 (3.9)	131 (5.2)	178 (7.0)	211 (8.3)	200 (7.9)	159 (6.3)	1,605 (63.2)
Source: Norwegian Meteorological Institute

== Government ==
Hægebostad Municipality is responsible for primary education (through 10th grade), outpatient health services, senior citizen services, welfare and other social services, zoning, economic development, and municipal roads and utilities. The municipality is governed by a municipal council of directly elected representatives. The mayor is indirectly elected by a vote of the municipal council. The municipality is under the jurisdiction of the Agder District Court and the Agder Court of Appeal.

=== Municipal council ===
The municipal council (Kommunestyre) of Hægebostad Municipality is made up of 17 representatives that are elected to four year terms. The tables below show the current and historical composition of the council by political party.

Hægebostad kommunestyre 2023–2027
Party name (in Nynorsk)	Number of representatives
Labour Party (Arbeidarpartiet)	2
Progress Party (Framstegspartiet)	3
Conservative Party (Høgre)	5
Christian Democratic Party (Kristeleg Folkeparti)	2
Centre Party (Senterpartiet)	4
Cross-party list (Tverrpolitisk liste)	1
Total number of members:	17

Hægebostad kommunestyre 2019–2023
Party name (in Nynorsk)	Number of representatives
Labour Party (Arbeidarpartiet)	1
Progress Party (Framstegspartiet)	3
Conservative Party (Høgre)	3
Christian Democratic Party (Kristeleg Folkeparti)	2
Centre Party (Senterpartiet)	6
Cross-party list (Tverrpolitisk liste)	2
Total number of members:	17

Hægebostad kommunestyre 2015–2019
Party name (in Nynorsk)	Number of representatives
Labour Party (Arbeidarpartiet)	1
Progress Party (Framstegspartiet)	3
Conservative Party (Høgre)	3
Christian Democratic Party (Kristeleg Folkeparti)	2
Centre Party (Senterpartiet)	4
Cross-party list (Tverrpolitisk liste)	2
Total number of members:	15

Hægebostad kommunestyre 2011–2015
Party name (in Nynorsk)	Number of representatives
Labour Party (Arbeidarpartiet)	2
Progress Party (Framstegspartiet)	3
Conservative Party (Høgre)	6
Christian Democratic Party (Kristeleg Folkeparti)	2
Centre Party (Senterpartiet)	2
Cooperation list (Samarbeidslista)	3
Cross-party list (Tverrpolitisk liste)	3
Total number of members:	21

Hægebostad kommunestyre 2007–2011
Party name (in Nynorsk)	Number of representatives
Labour Party (Arbeidarpartiet)	1
Progress Party (Framstegspartiet)	1
Conservative Party (Høgre)	3
Christian Democratic Party (Kristeleg Folkeparti)	4
Centre Party (Senterpartiet)	1
Cooperation list (Samarbeidslista)	6
Cross-party list (Tverrpolitisk liste)	5
Total number of members:	21

Hægebostad kommunestyre 2003–2007
Party name (in Nynorsk)	Number of representatives
Labour Party (Arbeidarpartiet)	2
Progress Party (Framstegspartiet)	1
Conservative Party (Høgre)	4
Christian Democratic Party (Kristeleg Folkeparti)	4
Centre Party (Senterpartiet)	1
Cooperation list (Samarbeidslista)	5
Cross-party list (Tverrpolitisk liste)	4
Total number of members:	21

Hægebostad kommunestyre 1999–2003
Party name (in Nynorsk)	Number of representatives
Labour Party (Arbeidarpartiet)	2
Conservative Party (Høgre)	3
Christian Democratic Party (Kristeleg Folkeparti)	5
Centre Party (Senterpartiet)	3
Cooperation list (Samarbeidslista)	4
Cross-party list (Tverrpolitisk liste)	4
Total number of members:	21

Hægebostad kommunestyre 1995–1999
Party name (in Nynorsk)	Number of representatives
Labour Party (Arbeidarpartiet)	4
Conservative Party (Høgre)	4
Christian Democratic Party (Kristeleg Folkeparti)	4
Centre Party (Senterpartiet)	6
Cross-party list (Tverrpolitisk liste)	3
Total number of members:	21

Hægebostad kommunestyre 1991–1995
Party name (in Nynorsk)	Number of representatives
Labour Party (Arbeidarpartiet)	3
Conservative Party (Høgre)	3
Christian Democratic Party (Kristeleg Folkeparti)	5
Centre Party (Senterpartiet)	7
Cross-party list (Tverrpolitisk liste)	3
Total number of members:	21

Hægebostad kommunestyre 1987–1991
Party name (in Nynorsk)	Number of representatives
Labour Party (Arbeidarpartiet)	4
Conservative Party (Høgre)	3
Christian Democratic Party (Kristeleg Folkeparti)	5
Centre Party (Senterpartiet)	5
Cross-party list (Tverrpolitisk liste)	4
Total number of members:	21

Hægebostad kommunestyre 1983–1987
Party name (in Nynorsk)	Number of representatives
Labour Party (Arbeidarpartiet)	4
Conservative Party (Høgre)	5
Christian Democratic Party (Kristeleg Folkeparti)	6
Centre Party (Senterpartiet)	2
Cross-party list (Tverrpolitisk liste)	4
Total number of members:	21

Hægebostad kommunestyre 1979–1983
Party name (in Nynorsk)	Number of representatives
Labour Party (Arbeidarpartiet)	3
Conservative Party (Høgre)	4
Christian Democratic Party (Kristeleg Folkeparti)	5
Centre Party (Senterpartiet)	4
Cross-party list for Hægebostad (Tverrpolitisk liste for Hægebostad)	5
Total number of members:	21

Hægebostad kommunestyre 1975–1979
Party name (in Nynorsk)	Number of representatives
Labour Party (Arbeidarpartiet)	4
Conservative Party (Høgre)	2
Christian Democratic Party (Kristeleg Folkeparti)	3
Centre Party (Senterpartiet)	3
Collaboration list for Eiken (Samarbeidsliste for Eiken)	5
Cross-party list for Hægebostad (Tverrpolitisk Liste for Hægebostad)	4
Total number of members:	21

Hægebostad kommunestyre 1971–1975
Party name (in Nynorsk)	Number of representatives
Labour Party (Arbeidarpartiet)	5
Conservative Party (Høgre)	2
Christian Democratic Party (Kristeleg Folkeparti)	4
Centre Party (Senterpartiet)	5
Local List(s) (Lokale lister)	5
Total number of members:	21

Hægebostad kommunestyre 1967–1971
Party name (in Nynorsk)	Number of representatives
Labour Party (Arbeidarpartiet)	5
Conservative Party (Høgre)	1
Christian Democratic Party (Kristeleg Folkeparti)	4
Centre Party (Senterpartiet)	5
Local List(s) (Lokale lister)	6
Total number of members:	21

Hægebostad kommunestyre 1963–1967
Party name (in Nynorsk)	Number of representatives
Labour Party (Arbeidarpartiet)	5
Joint List(s) of Non-Socialist Parties (Borgarlege Felleslister)	2
Local List(s) (Lokale lister)	14
Total number of members:	21

Hægebostad heradsstyre 1959–1963
Party name (in Nynorsk)	Number of representatives
Labour Party (Arbeidarpartiet)	3
Centre Party (Senterpartiet)	4
Liberal Party (Venstre)	1
Local List(s) (Lokale lister)	5
Total number of members:	13

Hægebostad heradsstyre 1955–1959
Party name (in Nynorsk)	Number of representatives
Labour Party (Arbeidarpartiet)	4
Farmers' Party (Bondepartiet)	6
Liberal Party (Venstre)	3
Total number of members:	13

Hægebostad heradsstyre 1951–1955
Party name (in Nynorsk)	Number of representatives
Labour Party (Arbeidarpartiet)	5
Farmers' Party (Bondepartiet)	6
Liberal Party (Venstre)	1
Total number of members:	12

Hægebostad heradsstyre 1947–1951
Party name (in Nynorsk)	Number of representatives
Labour Party (Arbeidarpartiet)	4
Joint List(s) of Non-Socialist Parties (Borgarlege Felleslister)	8
Total number of members:	12

Hægebostad heradsstyre 1945–1947
Party name (in Nynorsk)	Number of representatives
Labour Party (Arbeidarpartiet)	5
Communist Party (Kommunistiske Parti)	1
Joint List(s) of Non-Socialist Parties (Borgarlege Felleslister)	6
Total number of members:	12

Hægebostad heradsstyre 1937–1941*
Party name (in Nynorsk)	Number of representatives
Labour Party (Arbeidarpartiet)	5
Joint List(s) of Non-Socialist Parties (Borgarlege Felleslister)	6
Local List(s) (Lokale lister)	1
Total number of members:	12
Note: Due to the German occupation of Norway during World War II, no elections were held for new municipal councils until after the war ended in 1945.

=== Mayors ===
The mayor (Nynorsk: ordførar) of Hægebostad Municipality is the political leader of the municipality and the chairperson of the municipal council. The following people have held this position:

- 1838–1839: Torstein Torkelsen Urestad
- 1840–1841: Aasulv O. Bryggesaa
- 1842–1845: Tarald T. Jaadland
- 1846–1847: Torgeir Taraldsen Birkeland
- 1848–1849: Tarald T. Jaadland
- 1850–1853: Torgeir Taraldsen Birkeland
- 1854–1855: Aasulv Vik
- 1856–1857: Tarald T. Jaadland
- 1858–1859: Torgeir Taraldsen Birkeland
- 1860–1862: Hans Jakob Rolvsen
- 1863–1865: Torgeir Taraldsen Birkeland
- 1866–1867: Lars S. Haaberg
- 1868–1869: Olav Aasulvsen Bryggesaa
- 1870–1873: Torgeir Taraldsen Birkeland
- 1874–1875: Olav Aasulvsen Bryggesaa
- 1876–1879: Jon Olsen Ro
- 1880–1884: Arnstein Kristensen Tingvatne
- 1885–1885: Gunnleiv Aasulvsen Vik
- 1886–1887: Olav Paulsen Hobbesland
- 1888–1889: Arnstein Kristensen Tingvatne
- 1889–1902: Aasulv Olsen Bryggesaa (V)
- 1902–1908: Jon J. Snartemo
- 1908–1912: Knut Tobiassen Steinsland
- 1913–1916: Torkild Flottorp
- 1917–1919: Olav T. Mydland
- 1920–1929: Ole Aanensen Birkeland
- 1929–1931: Johannes Jensen Eilevstad
- 1931–1940: Knut Bjærum
- 1941–1941: Torstein Hamran
- 1943–1945: Olav Rolvsen
- 1945–1945: Knut Bjærum
- 1946–1947: Olav T. Bryggeså
- 1947–1951: Arthur Gysland
- 1951–1955: Olav T. Bryggeså
- 1955–1959: Anders Hommen (Ap)
- 1959–1965: Martin Klungland (LL)
- 1965–1967: Sverre Eiken
- 1967–1971: Olav Audvin Meland (Sp)
- 1971–1975: Martin Klungland (LL)
- 1975–1979: Lars Asbjørn Bryggeså (LL)
- 1979–1987: Gunnar Eikeland (H)
- 1987–1995: John Fidjeland (KrF)
- 1995–1999: Gunnar Eikeland (H)
- 1999–2011: Ånen Werdal (H)
- 2007–2011: John Fidjeland (KrF)
- 2011–2015: Ånen Werdal (H)
- 2015–2023: Margrethe Handeland (Sp)
- 2023–present: Jan Petter Gysland (H)

== Culture ==
=== Churches ===
The Church of Norway has two parishes (sokn) within Hægebostad Municipality. It is part of the Lister og Mandal prosti (deanery) in the Diocese of Agder og Telemark.

Churches in Hægebostad Municipality
Parish (sokn)	Church name	Location of the church	Year built
Eiken	Eiken Church	Eiken	1817
Hægebostad	Hægebostad Church	Snartemo	1844

== Notable people ==
- Johan Arnt Wenaas (1941 in Hægebostad – 2015), a priest and writer
