= Tingvatn =

Village in Hægebostad Municipality, Norway

Tingvatn Tingvatne
- Village
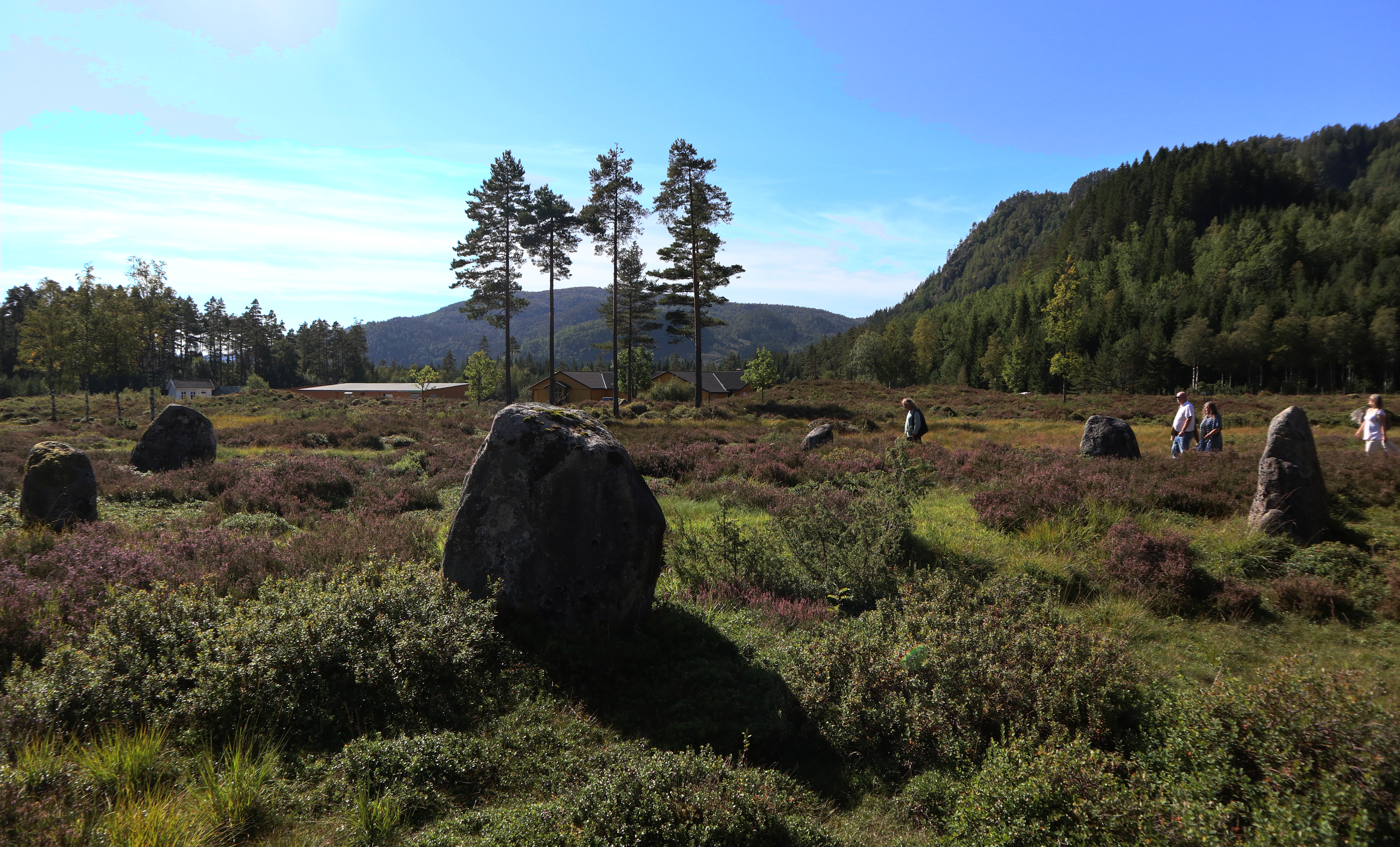
- View of the area just outside the village
- Interactive map of Tingvatn
- Coordinates: 58.39785°N 7.22739°E
- Country: Norway
- Region: Southern Norway
- County: Agder
- District: Lister
- Municipality: Hægebostad Municipality
- Elevation: 204 m (669 ft)
- Time zone: UTC+01:00 (CET)
  - Summer (DST): UTC+02:00 (CEST)
- Post Code: 4595 Tingvatn

Tingvatn is the administrative centre of Hægebostad Municipality in Agder county, Norway. The village is located along the river Lygna, just south of the lake Lygne. The village of Eiken lies about 10 kilometres (6.2 mi) to the north, the village of Skeie lies about 7 kilometres (4.3 mi) to the north, and the village of Snartemo lies about 7 kilometres (4.3 mi) to the south. The small village of Tingvatn has about 100 residents in it including the southern area which is also known as Birkeland.
