= Audnedal station =

Railway station in Audnedal, Norway

Audnedal
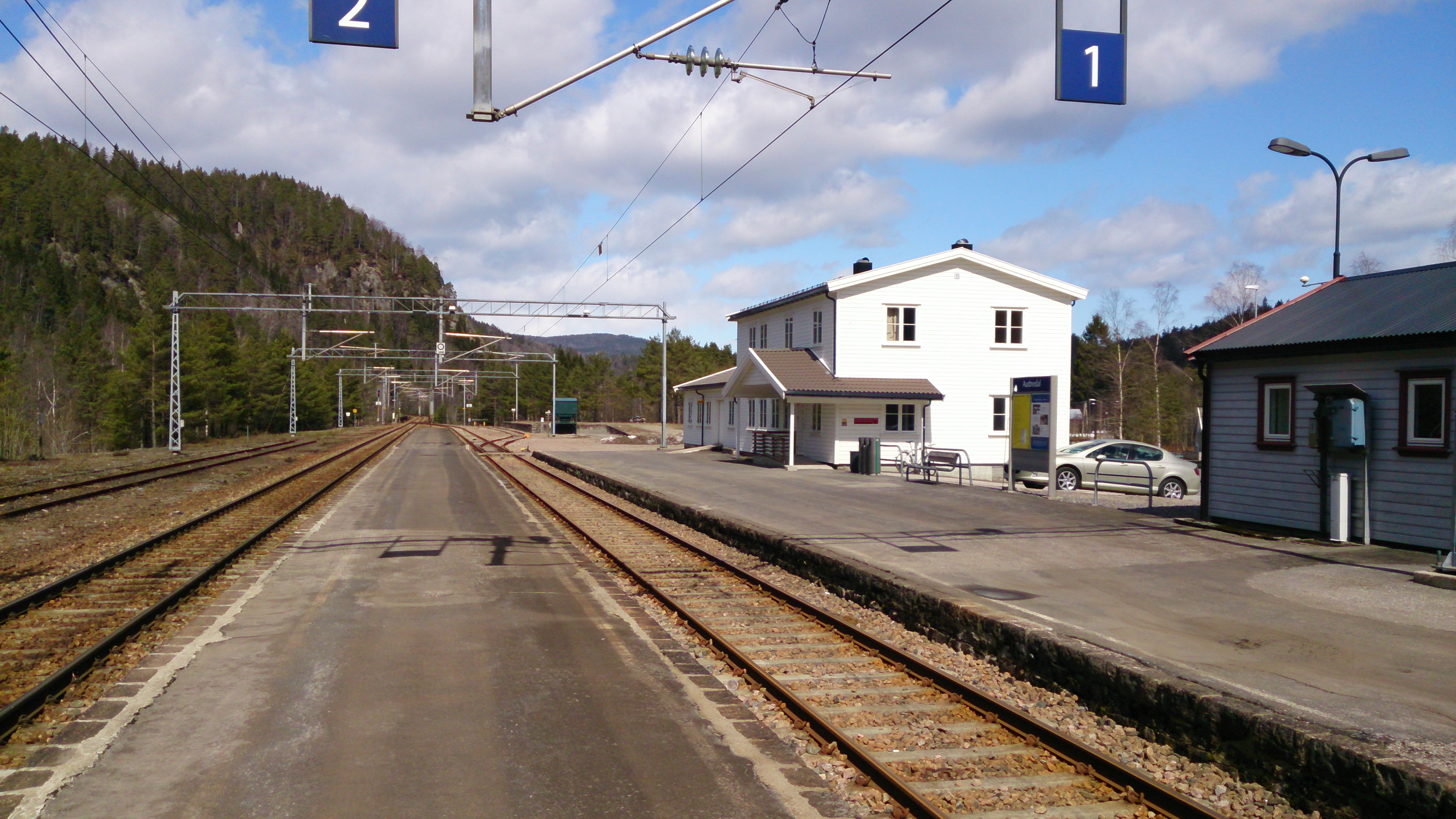

General information
- Location: Konsmo, Lyngdal Municipality; Norway
- Coordinates: 58°19′7.76″N 7°22′1.58″E
- Elevation: 106.6 m (350 ft) AMSL
- Owner: Bane NOR
- Operator: Go-Ahead Norge
- Line: Sørlandet Line
- Distance: 419.34 km (260.57 mi)
- Platforms: 2
- Tracks: 3

Construction
- Parking: 30 spaces
- Accessible: No
- Architect: NSB Arkitektkontor

Other information
- Station code: AUD

History
- Opened: 17 December 1943

Passengers
- 14,600 (annually)
Location

Audnedal Station (Norwegian: Audnedal stasjon) is a railway station of the Sørlandet Line situated just north of the village of Konsmo in Lyngdal Municipality in Agder county, Norway. Located 419.34 kilometers (260.57 mi) from Oslo Central Station, the station is served by long-distance trains operated by Go-Ahead Norge. In addition to intercity services to Oslo and Stavanger, the eight daily trains in each direction serve as a commuter link to Kristiansand, located forty minutes away. The station features two platforms and a station building. Just west of the station is the Hægebostad Tunnel, one of the longest tunnels in Norway.

The station was opened on 17 December 1943 as part of the segment of the Sørlandet Line between Kristiasand and Sira. The line past the station was electrified from 1944, when regular traffic started. The station was automated in 1969 and became unstaffed the following year. The station has seen a many-fold increase in traffic since 2000 and it is scheduled for a platform upgrade by 2019.

== History ==
Audnedal Station was built during the Second World War under the German-administrated expansion of the Sørlandet Line west of Kristiansand. The station building was completed in 1942 after designs by Gudmund Hoel and Bjarne F. Baastad at NSB Arkitektkontor. It was originally proposed to be named Øydesland, but this was changed to Audnedal since at that time it was located in Audnedal Municipality. Irregular revenue traffic commenced on the line on 17 December 1943 and the station became operative from the same day. Electric traction was introduced on 18 February 1944, ahead of ordinary traffic commencing on 1 March 1944.

The cargo annex was extended around 1950. An interlocking system became operational on 17 July 1969, allowing the station to become remotely controlled from 19 August 1969. The station became unstaffed from 1 June 1970.

The station experienced a renaissance during the 2000s. At that time the station started generating commuter traffic to Kristiansand. This traffic had increased greatly and now constitutes the bulk of traffic out of the station. Ridership was 2,400 annually in 2005, rising to 17,096 in 2010. Around then the Norwegian National Rail Administration carried out a cleaning of the station, renovating the station building, asphalting the parking lot and clearing out wild growth.

== Facilities ==
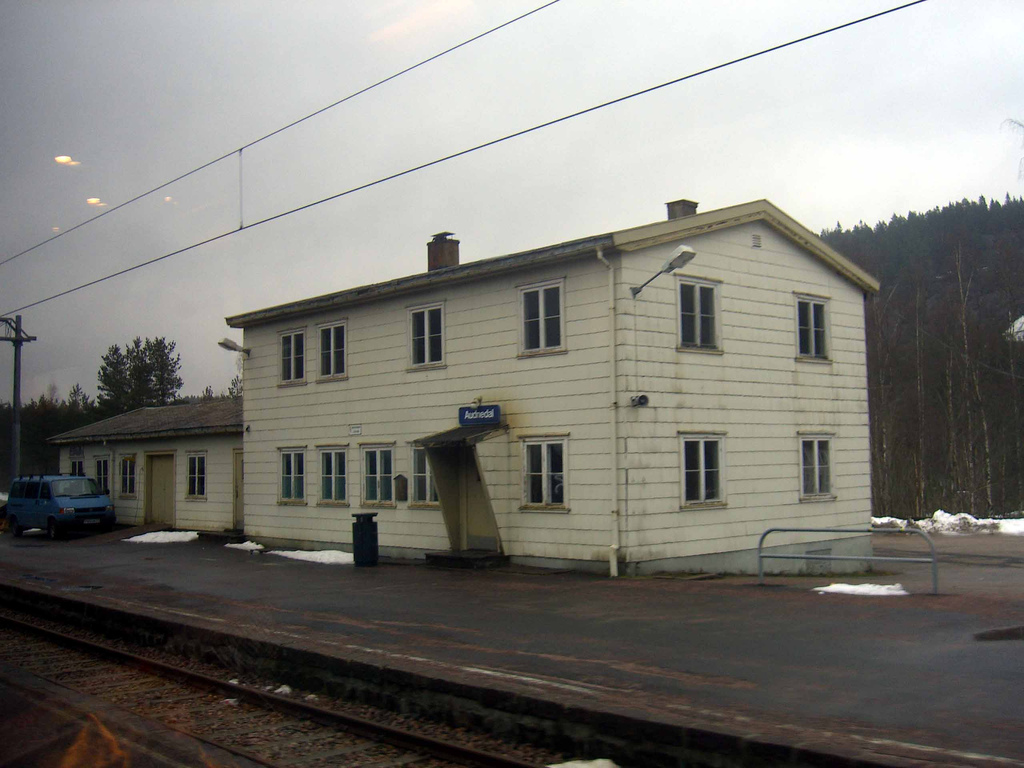
The station building in 2007, before the renovation

Audnedal Station is a station on the Sørlandet Line, located 419.34 kilometers (260.57 mi) from Oslo Central Station at an elevation of 106.6 meters (350 ft) above mean sea level. Just west of the station, covering nearly the entire line to Snartemo Station, is the 8,474-kilometer (5,265 mi) Hægebostad Tunnel, the fifth-longest railway tunnel in Norway.

The station features a 302-meter (991 ft) passing loop. There is a main side platform serving track 1, which is 65 meters (213 ft) long, and a 155-meter (509 ft) island platform serving track 2. Both are 25 centimeters (9.8 in) tall. Most trains stop at track 2, with the longer platform, and only when trains meet at Audnedal is track 1 in use.

Like the other stations along the Sørlandet Line, the station building received a standardized design. It was built in the overall Neoclassical architecture style adapted in the 1920s. By the 1940s the designs had been altered to include elements of functionalism. Audnedal received an identical station building to that of Storekvina Station. The 180 square meters (1,900 sq ft) building is wooden with a concrete foundation. It has siding in asbestos cement and a gable roof. The building consists of a main section, where the lower story originally featured a ticketing and waiting room, and an upper story with the station master's residence. The annex was allocated cargo handling. There is also a 35-square-meter (380 sq ft) shed housing the interlocking controls, dating from 1968. Today the station building features a waiting room and a washroom, open around the clock except from 21:00 on Saturday to 07:00 on Sunday. The upper part of the station serves as a residence. There is free parking for 30 cars at the station.

== Services ==
The catchment area of Audnedal Station includes Lyngdal Municipality, Åseral Municipality, and Lindesnes Municipality. The station is itself located a few kilometers north of the village of Konsmo.

The station is served by long-distance trains operated by Go-Ahead, counting eight daily services on weekdays, including a night train service. These operate from Oslo via Kristiansand to Stavanger. Audnedal is located within the catchment area for commuting to Kristiansand. The train uses forty minutes to Kristiansand Station. This is less than half the time used to drive, which is further hampered by congestion during rush-hour. The station had 14,600 annual passengers in 2008.

== Future ==
The short platforms have caused the Norwegian Railway Authority to demand that they be lengthened to 220 meters (720 ft) and heightened to 76 centimeters (30 in) by 2019, or the station closed. The National Rail Administration has estimated the upgrades to cost 25 million Norwegian krone and has planned to carry out the upgrade by 2019.

Preceding station	Express trains	Following station
Snartemo towards Stavanger	F5	Marnardal towards Oslo S
