= Kvås Church =

Church in Agder, Norway

- Kvås kirke
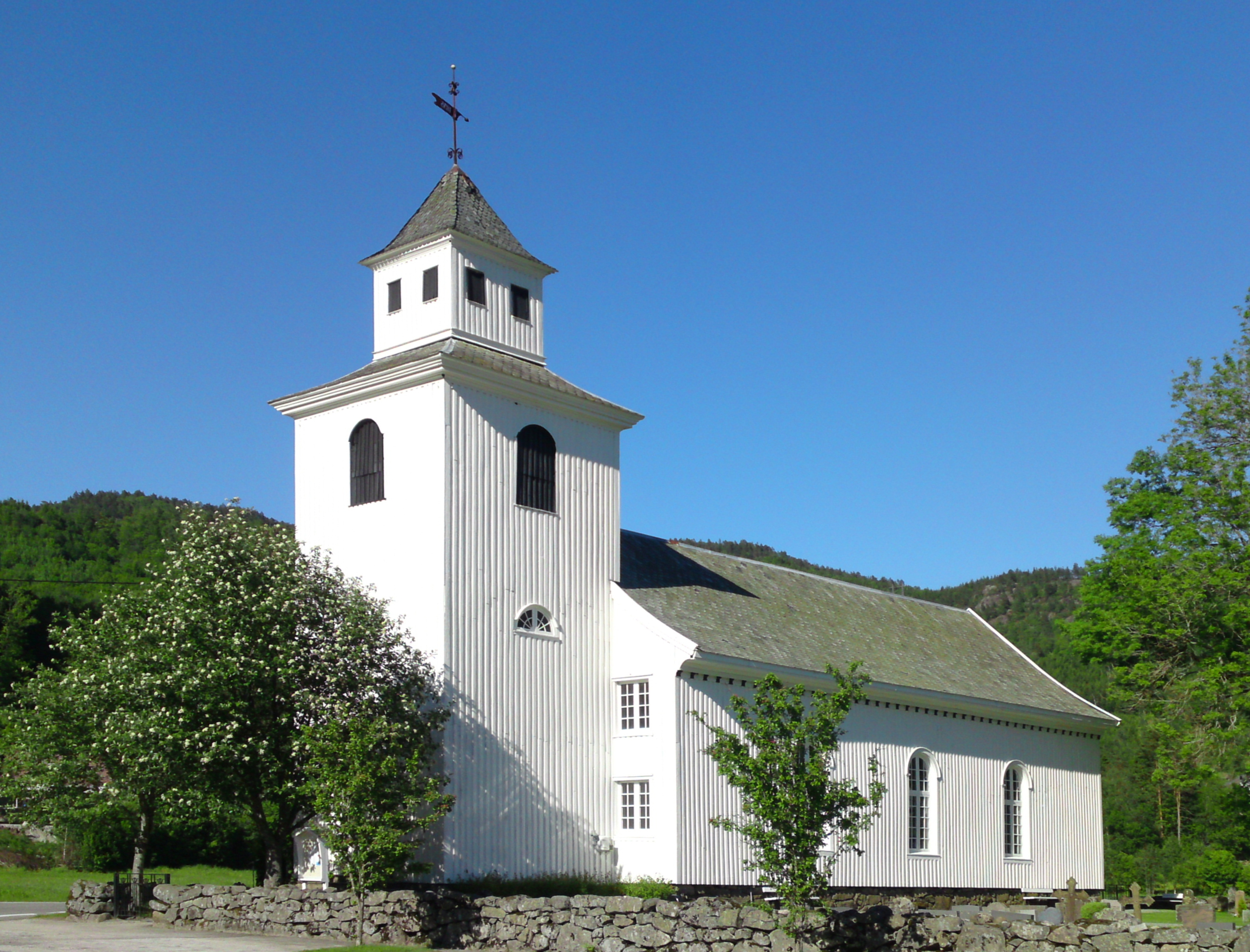
- View of the church
- Kvås Church
- 58.2633°N 07.1996°E
- Location: Lyngdal Municipality, Agder
- Country: Norway
- Denomination: Church of Norway
- Churchmanship: Evangelical Lutheran

History
- Status: Parish church
- Founded: Middle Ages
- Consecrated: 1836

Architecture
- Functional status: Active
- Architectural type: Long church
- Completed: 1836; 190 years ago

Specifications
- Capacity: 300
- Materials: Wood

Administration
- Diocese: Agder og Telemark
- Deanery: Lister og Mandal prosti
- Parish: Lyngdal
- Norwegian Cultural Heritage Site
- Type: Church
- Status: Listed
- ID: 84876

Kvås Church (Norwegian: Kvås kirke) is a parish church of the Church of Norway in Lyngdal Municipality in Agder county, Norway. It is located in the village of Kvås. It is one of the churches for the Lyngdal parish which is part of the Lister og Mandal prosti (deanery) in the Diocese of Agder og Telemark. The white, wooden church was built in a long church design in 1836 using plans drawn up by an unknown architect. The church seats about 300 people.

== History ==
The earliest existing historical records of the church date back to the late 1600s, but the church was described as "old" at that time. The old timber-framed building was in constant need of repairs, which were carried out repeatedly. In 1785, a rock wall was constructed around the church cemetery which encircled the church building. In 1834, the old church building was torn down and over the next two years, a new church building was constructed on the same site.

== See also ==
- List of churches in Agder og Telemark
