= Eiken Church =

Church in Agder, Norway

- Eiken kirke
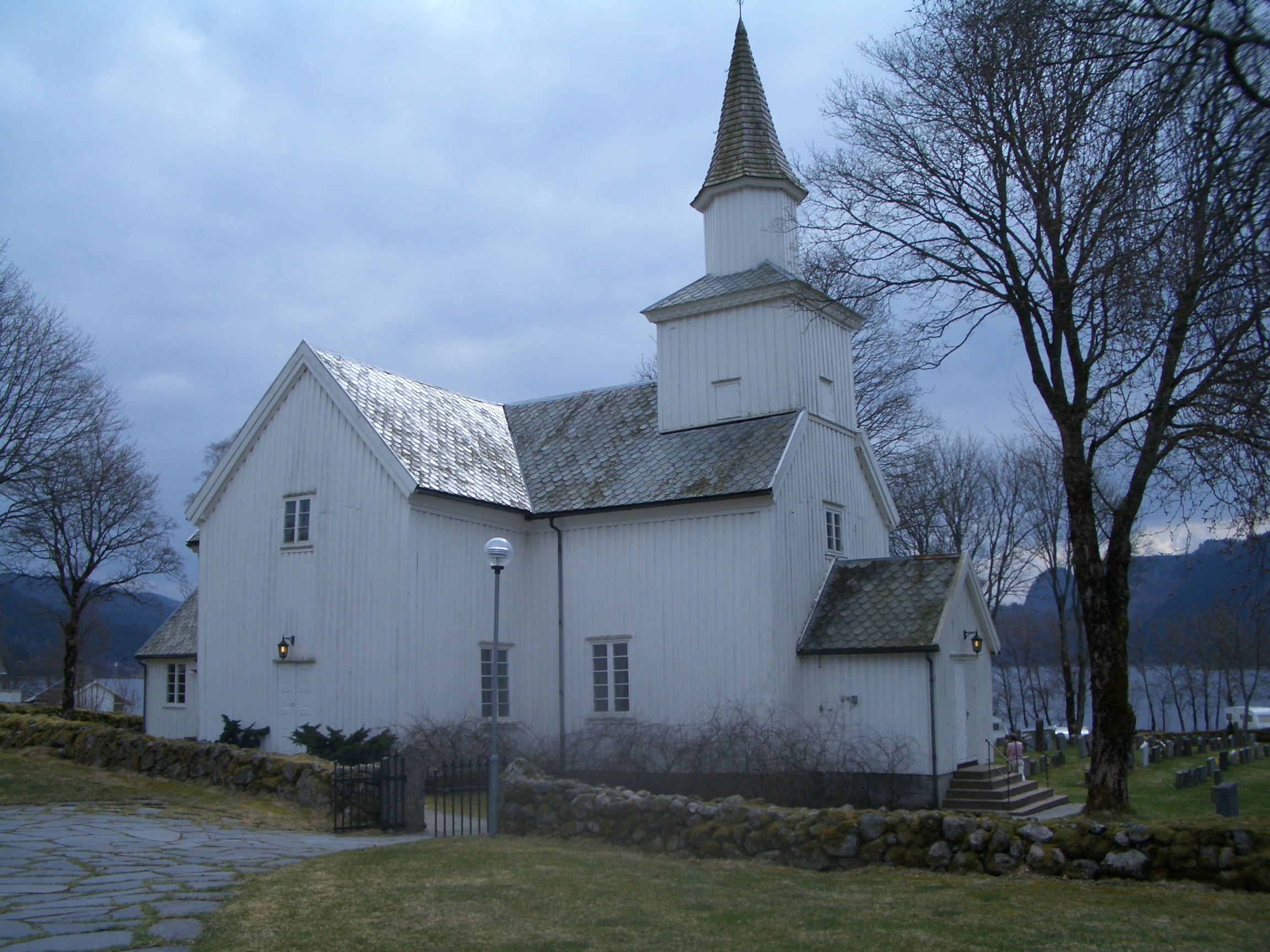
- View of the church
- Eiken Church
- 58.4779°N 07.2084°E
- Location: Hægebostad Municipality, Agder
- Country: Norway
- Denomination: Church of Norway
- Churchmanship: Evangelical Lutheran

History
- Status: Parish church
- Founded: Middle Ages
- Consecrated: 1817

Architecture
- Functional status: Active
- Architectural type: Cruciform
- Completed: 1817; 209 years ago

Specifications
- Capacity: 300
- Materials: Wood

Administration
- Diocese: Agder og Telemark
- Deanery: Lister og Mandal prosti
- Parish: Eiken
- Norwegian Cultural Heritage Site
- Type: Church
- Status: Listed
- ID: 84078

Eiken Church (Norwegian: Eiken kirke) is a parish church of the Church of Norway in Hægebostad Municipality in Agder county, Norway. It is located along the lake Lygne in the village of Eiken. It is the church for the Eiken parish which is part of the Lister og Mandal prosti (deanery) in the Diocese of Agder og Telemark. The white, wooden church was built in a cruciform design in 1817 using plans drawn up by an unknown architect. The church seats about 300 people.

== History ==
The earliest existing historical records of the church date back to the year 1417, but the church was not built that year. It is not known when the church was originally built, but in a church inspection in 1725, the church was described as "old". In 1818, the old church was torn down and replaced with a new cruciform building on the same site as the previous building. Some of the old materials from the previous building were reused in the construction of the new church building. In 1860, the cemetery was expanded to the northwest by adding an additional 50 square metres (540 ft^{2}). Then in 1899-1900, the cemetery was expanded to the south by adding about 1,000 square metres (0.25 acres).

== See also ==
- List of churches in Agder og Telemark
