= Johan Arnt Wenaas =

Norwegian priest (1941–2015)

Johan Arnt Wenaas (16 May 1941 – 28 July 2015) was a Norwegian priest.

He was born in Hægebostad Municipality, and took the cand.theol. degree at the MF Norwegian School of Theology in 1966. He was ordained as a priest in 1967, worked as a curate in Jeløy from 1968 to 1974, and priest at Lovisenberg Hospital from 1974 to 1980. He was superintendent and director of the Deaconess House (now: Lovisenberg Diaconal University College) from 1980 to 1992 and secretary-general of the Social Service of the Church of Norway from 1992 to 2008. He released multiple books. He died in July 2015 in Hvitsten.
