= Lygna =

River in Agder, Norway

Lygna Lyngdalselva Storåni
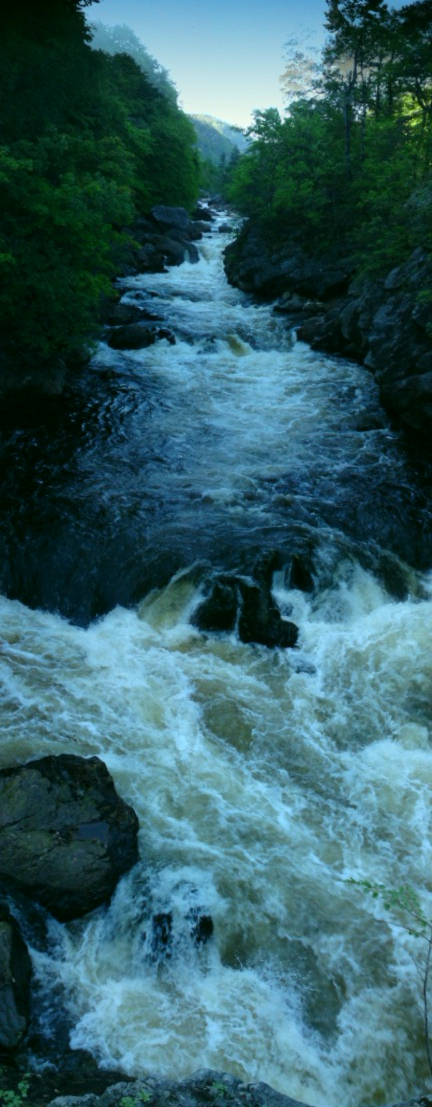
- Kvåsfossen waterfall on the river Lygna

Location
- Country: Norway
- County: Agder
- District: Lister Region
- Municipality: Lyngdal Municipality, Hægebostad Municipality

Physical characteristics
- Source: Øyvassheia
  - location: Hægebostad Municipality, Agder, Norway
  - coordinates: 58°39′19″N 07°06′59″E
  - elevation: 909 m (2,982 ft)
- Mouth: Alleen
  - location: Lyngdal Municipality, Agder, Norway
  - coordinates: 58°08′32″N 07°02′58″E
  - elevation: 0 m (0 ft)
- Length: 82.2 km (51.1 mi)
- Basin size: 667.08 km^{2} (257.56 sq mi)
- Discharge
  - average: 35.9 m^{3}/s (1,270 cu ft/s)

Lygna or Lyngdalselva is a river in Agder county, Norway. The 82.2-kilometre (51.1 mi) river runs from the mountains in northern Hægebostad Municipality, through the Lyngdalen valley to Lyngdal Municipality to its mouth at Alleen, where it runs into Lyngdalsfjorden. Lygna has a discharge of 35.9 cubic metres per second (1,270 cu ft/s), and a drainage basin covering 664.3 square kilometres (256.5 sq mi). The river is called the Storåni north of the lake Lygne. The river passes the villages of Tingvatn, Snartemo, and Kvås as well as the town of Lyngdal.

== See also ==
- List of rivers in Norway
