= Eiken, Agder =

Village in Hægebostad Municipality, Norway

Eiken
- Village
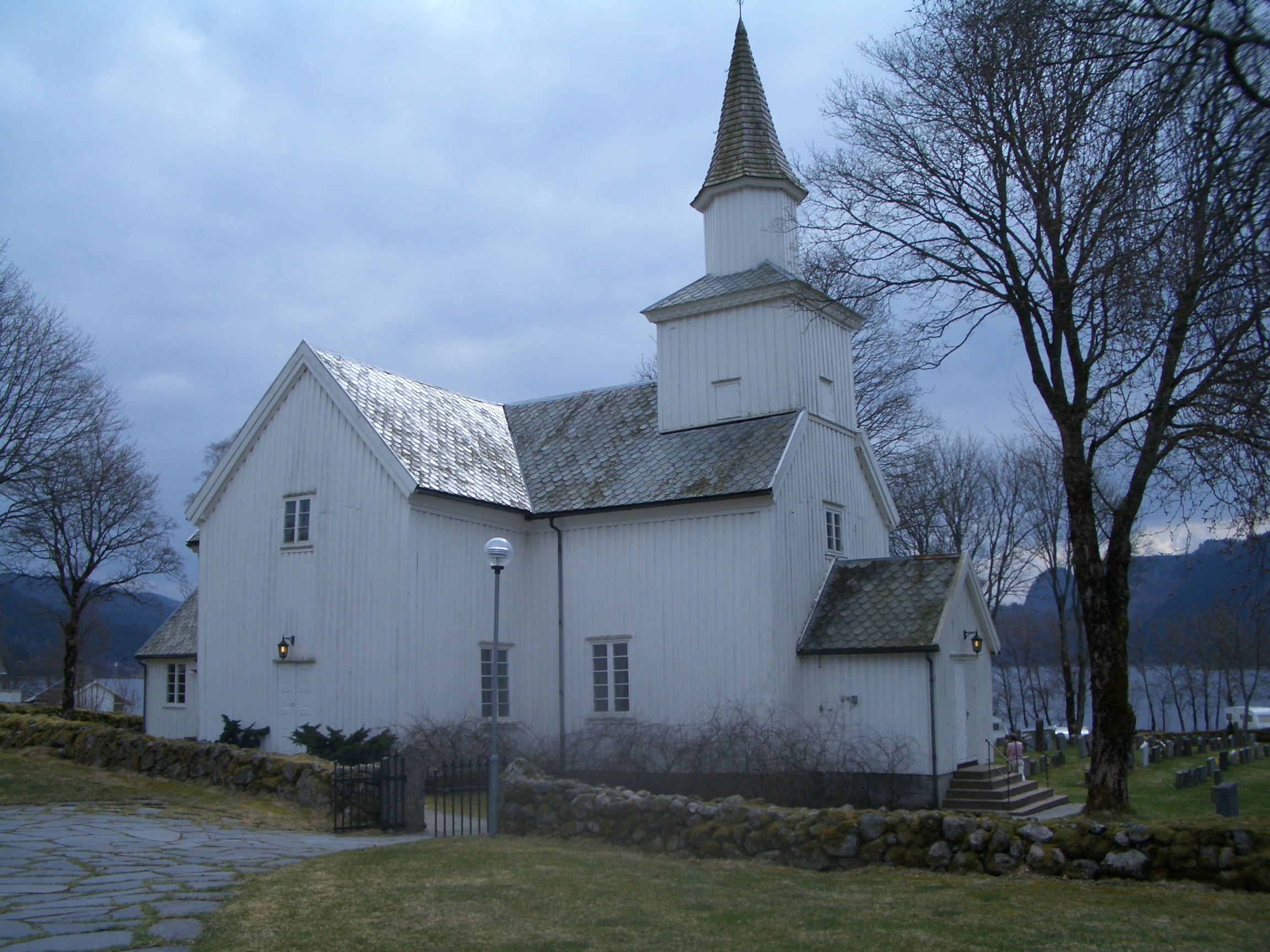
- View of the village church
- Interactive map of Eiken
- Coordinates: 58.47874°N 7.20846°E
- Country: Norway
- Region: Southern Norway
- County: Agder
- District: Lister
- Municipality: Hægebostad Municipality
- Elevation: 190 m (620 ft)
- Time zone: UTC+01:00 (CET)
  - Summer (DST): UTC+02:00 (CEST)
- Post Code: 4596 Eiken

Eiken is a village in Hægebostad Municipality in Agder county, Norway. The village is located on the northern shore of the lake Lygne, about 10 kilometres (6.2 mi) north of the municipal centre of Tingvatn and about 3 kilometres (1.9 mi) north of the village of Skeie. The village sits near the northern end of the Lyngdalen valley, about 7 kilometres (4.3 mi) southeast of the village of Haddeland.

There is some industry and agriculture as well as a good amount of tourism. The Sørlandets Rehabiliteringssenter Eiken (lit. 'Southern Norway Rehabilitation Centre') is located in Eiken and run by the Southern and Eastern Norway Regional Health Authority. The village is also the site of Eiken Church which serves the northern part of the municipality.

== History ==
From 1916 until 1963, the village was the administrative centre of the old Eiken Municipality.

=== Name ===
The village (originally the parish) is named after the old Eiken farm (Old Norse: Æke). The name of the farm the definite form of the Norwegian word eik which means "oak tree".
