= Lygne =

Lake in Agder, Norway

- Interactive map of Lygne
- Location: Hægebostad Municipality, Agder
- Coordinates: 58.45066°N 7.23077°E
- Primary outflows: Lygna river
- Basin countries: Norway
- Max. length: 10.4 kilometres (6.5 mi)
- Max. width: 1.7 kilometres (1.1 mi)
- Surface area: 7.56 km^{2} (2.92 sq mi)
- Shore length^{1}: 27.19 kilometres (16.90 mi)
- Surface elevation: 188 metres (617 ft)
- Settlements: Eiken, Tingvatn
- References: NVE
- ^{1} Shore length is not a well-defined measure.

Lygne is a lake in Hægebostad Municipality in Agder county, Norway. The 7.56-square-kilometre (2.92 sq mi) lake is part of the river Lygna. The lake begins near the village of Eiken in the north and stretches about 10.4 kilometres (6.5 mi) to the south to the village of Tingvatn. Part of the western shore has fairly steep cliffs overlooking the lake, but the rest of the shoreline is relatively flat with houses and roads.

== See also ==
- List of lakes in Norway
