= Brunkeberg =

Brunkeberg may refer to:

== Places ==
=== Norway ===
- Brunkeberg (Telemark), a village in Kviteseid municipality in Telemark county, Norway
- Brunkeberg Church, a church in Kviteseid municipality in Telemark county, Norway

=== Sweden ===
- Brunkebergsåsen, an esker in Stockholm, Sweden
- Brunkeberg Tunnel, a tunnel in Stockholm, Sweden

== Other ==
- Battle of Brunkeberg, a battle fought in Stockholm, Sweden, between the Swedish regent Sten Sture the Elder and forces led by Danish King Christian I
