= Brunkeberg (Telemark) =

Village in Kviteseid Municipality, Norway

- Village
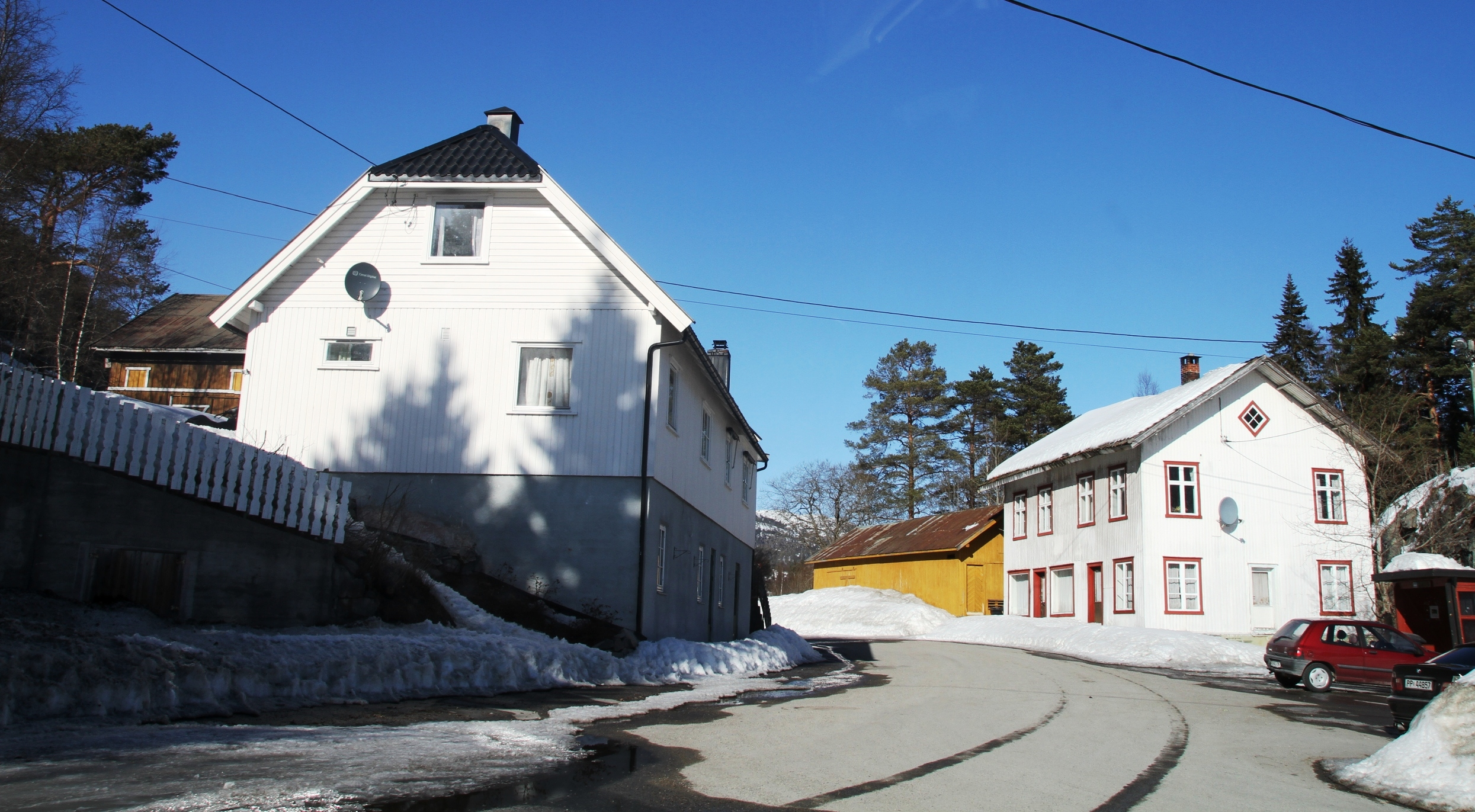
- View of the village
- Interactive map of Brunkeberg
- Coordinates: 59.43464°N 8.48304°E
- Country: Norway
- Region: Eastern Norway
- County: Telemark
- District: Vest-Telemark
- Municipality: Kviteseid Municipality
- Elevation: 390 m (1,280 ft)
- Time zone: UTC+01:00 (CET)
  - Summer (DST): UTC+02:00 (CEST)
- Post Code: 3850 Kviteseid

Brunkeberg is a village in Kviteseid Municipality in Telemark county, Norway. The village is located at the intersection of the European route E134 highway and the Norwegian National Road 41. Brunkeberg Church is a white cruciform church from 1790 that is located in the village centre.

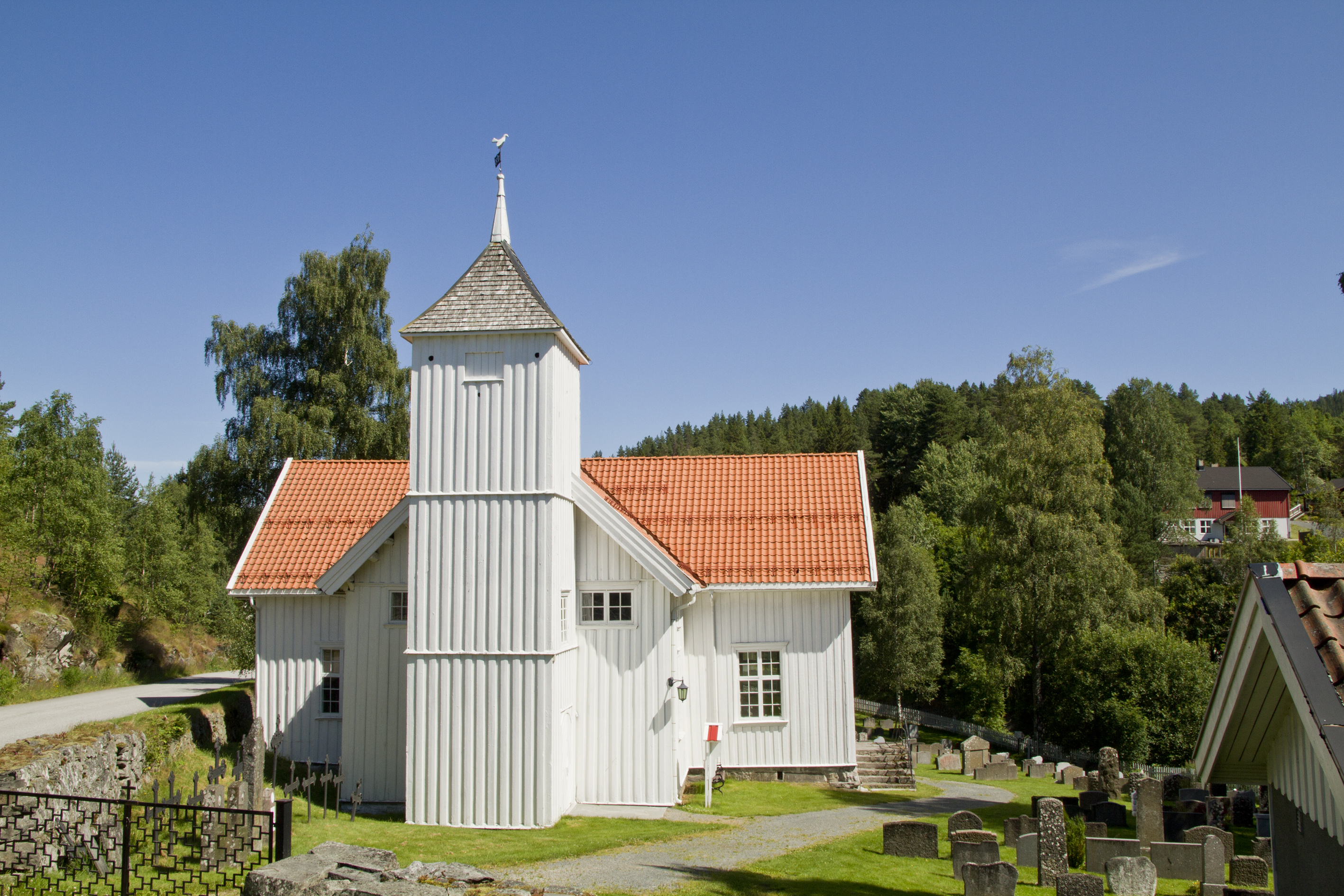
Brunkeberg Church

The village is located in a narrow valley about 4 kilometres (2.5 mi) to the north of the village of Kviteseid, about 5 kilometres (3.1 mi) to the west of the village of Åsgrenda, and about 6 kilometres (3.7 mi) to the southeast of the village of Morgedal.
