= Brunkeberg Church =

Church in Telemark, Norway

- Brunkeberg kyrkje
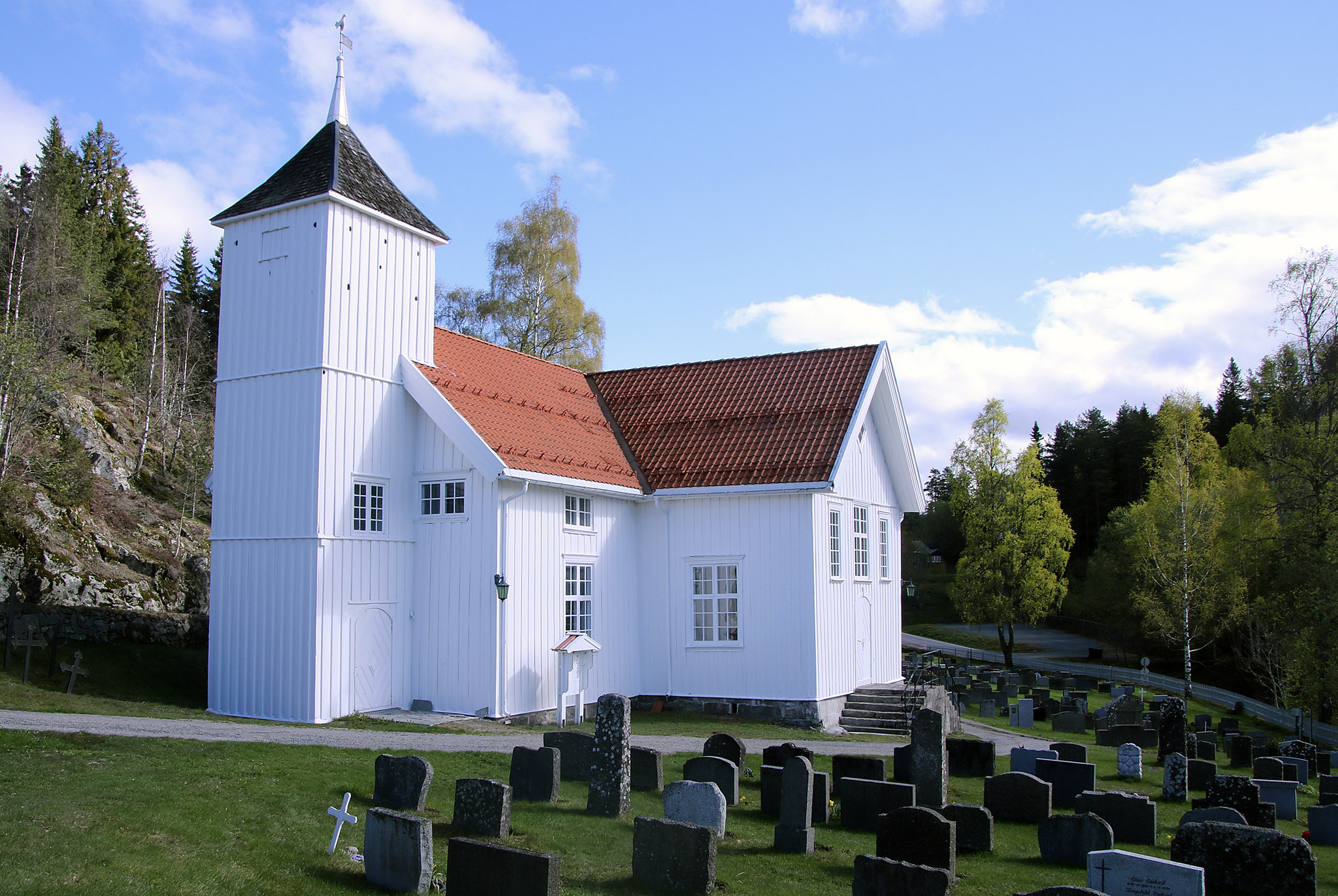
- View of the church
- Brunkeberg Church
- 59°26′03″N 8°28′55″E
- Location: Kviteseid Municipality, Telemark
- Country: Norway
- Denomination: Church of Norway
- Previous denomination: Catholic Church
- Churchmanship: Evangelical Lutheran

History
- Status: Parish church
- Founded: c. 1200
- Consecrated: 20 October 1790

Architecture
- Functional status: Active
- Architect: Saamund Gjersund
- Architectural type: Cruciform
- Completed: 1790 (236 years ago)

Specifications
- Capacity: 300
- Materials: Wood

Administration
- Diocese: Agder og Telemark
- Deanery: Øvre Telemark prosti
- Parish: Kviteseid
- Norwegian Cultural Heritage Site
- Type: Church
- Status: Automatically protected
- ID: 83961

Brunkeberg Church (Norwegian: Brunkeberg kyrkje) is a parish church of the Church of Norway in Kviteseid Municipality in Telemark county, Norway. It is located in the village of Brunkeberg. It is one of the churches in the Kviteseid parish which is part of the Øvre Telemark prosti (deanery) in the Diocese of Agder og Telemark. The white, wooden church was built in a cruciform design in 1790 by the builder Saamund Gjersund. The church seats about 300 people.

== History ==
The earliest existing historical records of the church date back to the year 1349, but the church was not built that year. The first church in Brunkeberg was a wooden stave church that was likely built on the same site around the year 1200. Little is known about the old building, but it served as an annex chapel to the main Kviteseid Church for centuries. Around the year 1680, there was a fire in the church which significantly damaged the building. It took about five years to repair and rebuild the damaged areas. By the 1700s, the parish had grown and the church was too small, so planning began on a new building. In 1790, the old church was torn down and a new wooden cruciform church was built on the same site. Saamund Gjersund was the lead builder. The church was consecrated on 20 October 1790. The church underwent a restoration from 1939 to 1941, with its re-dedication and re-opening service held on 31 August 1941. In 1997, a sacristy was built to the east of the chancel.

== Media gallery ==
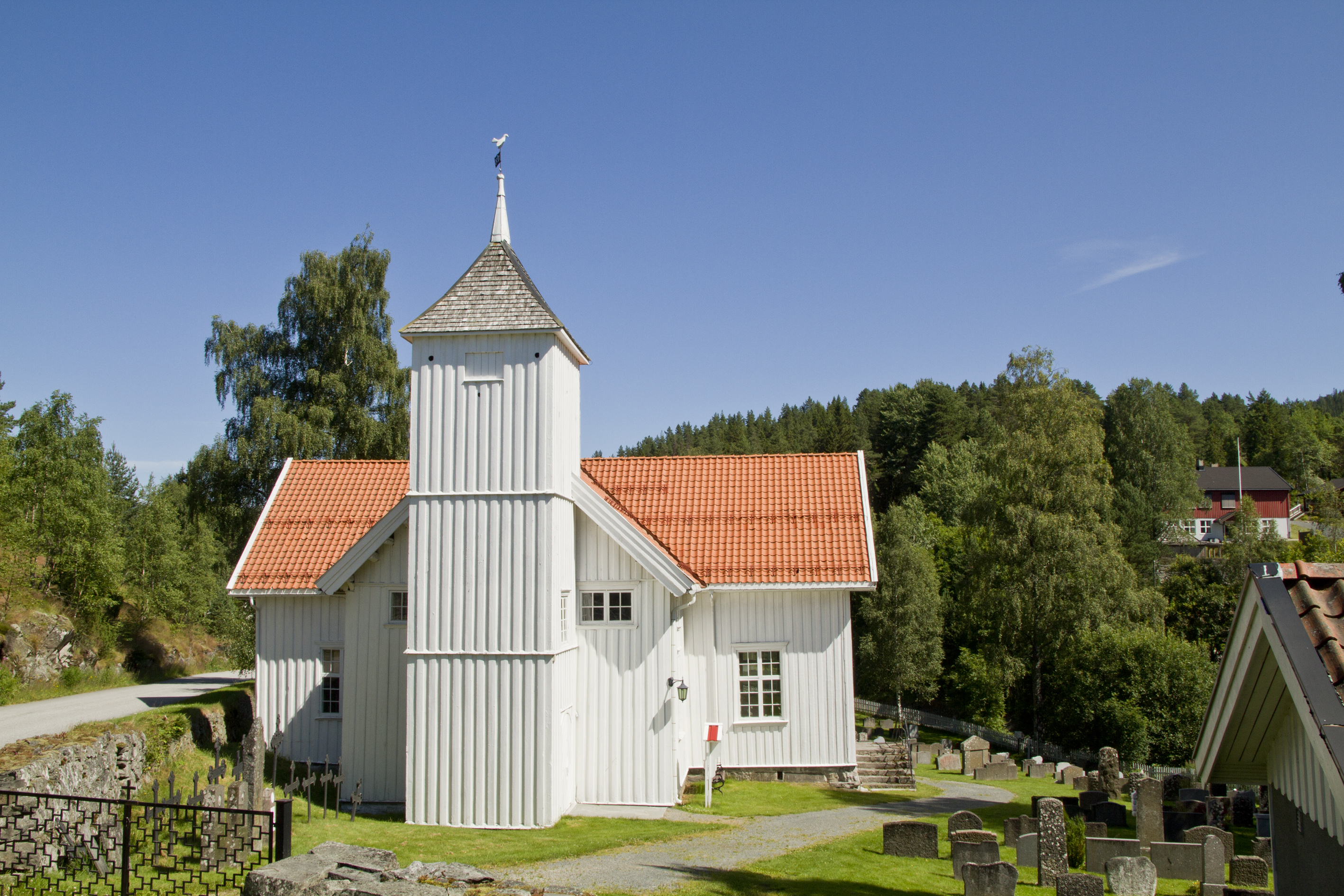

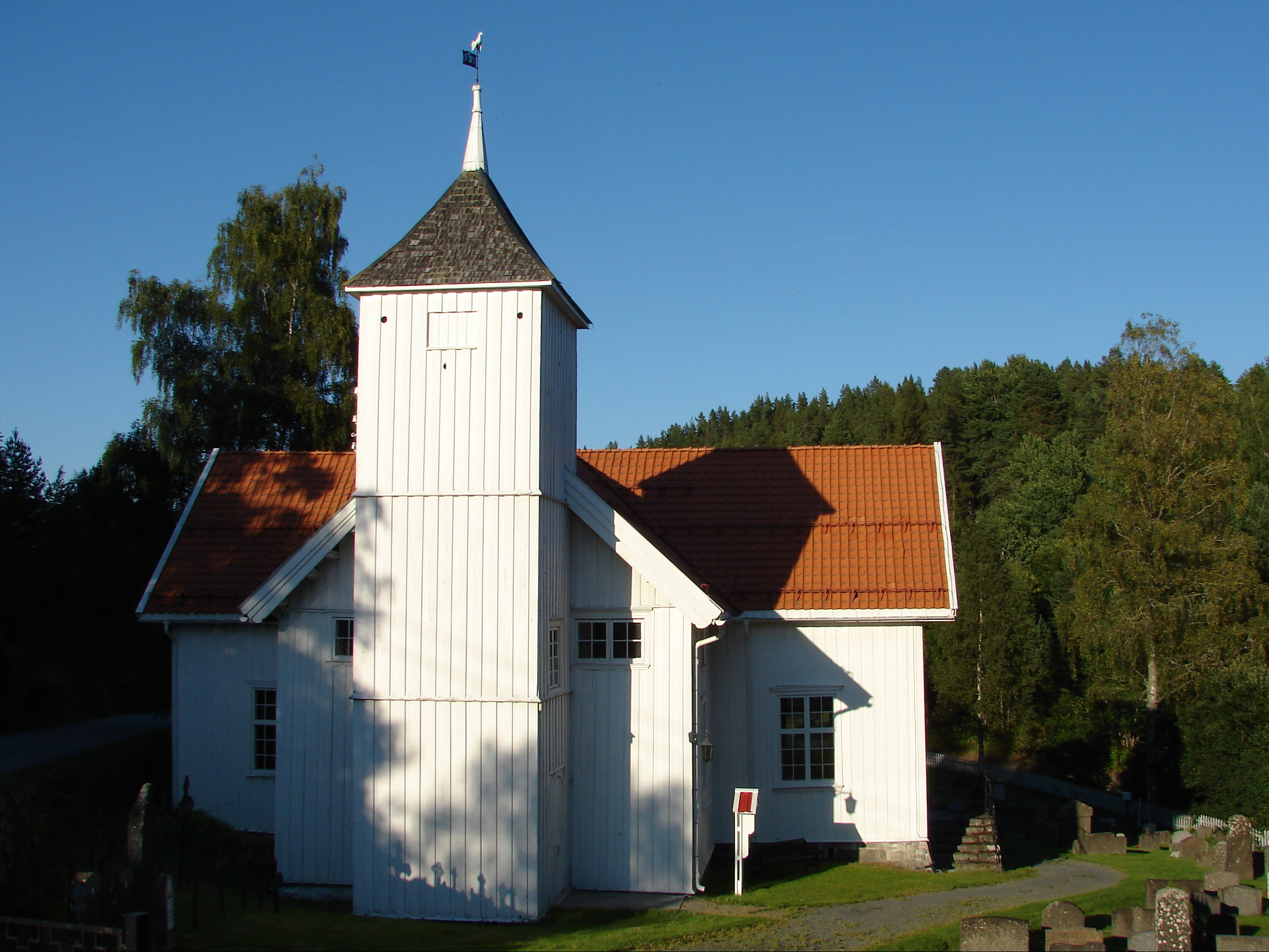

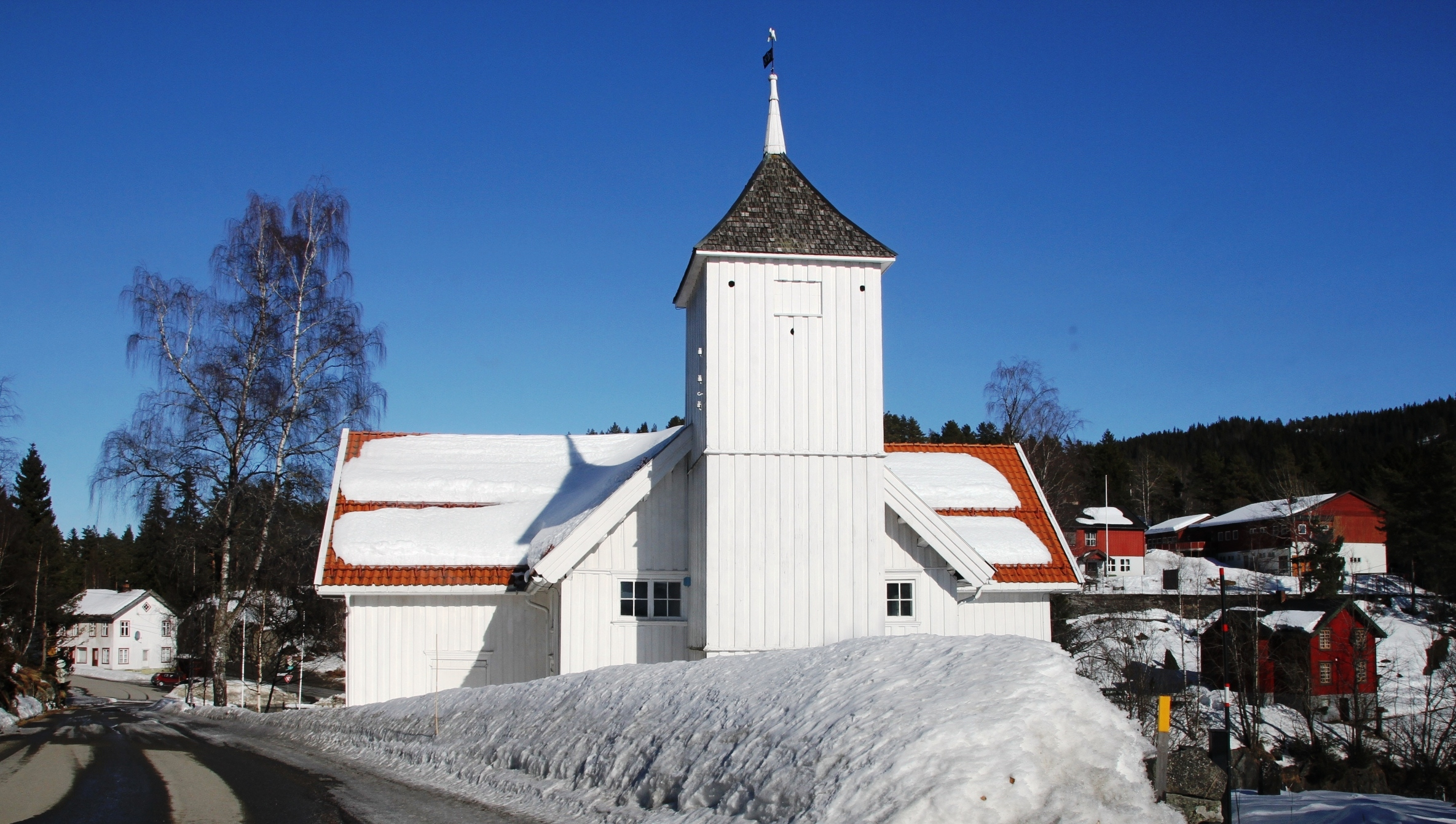

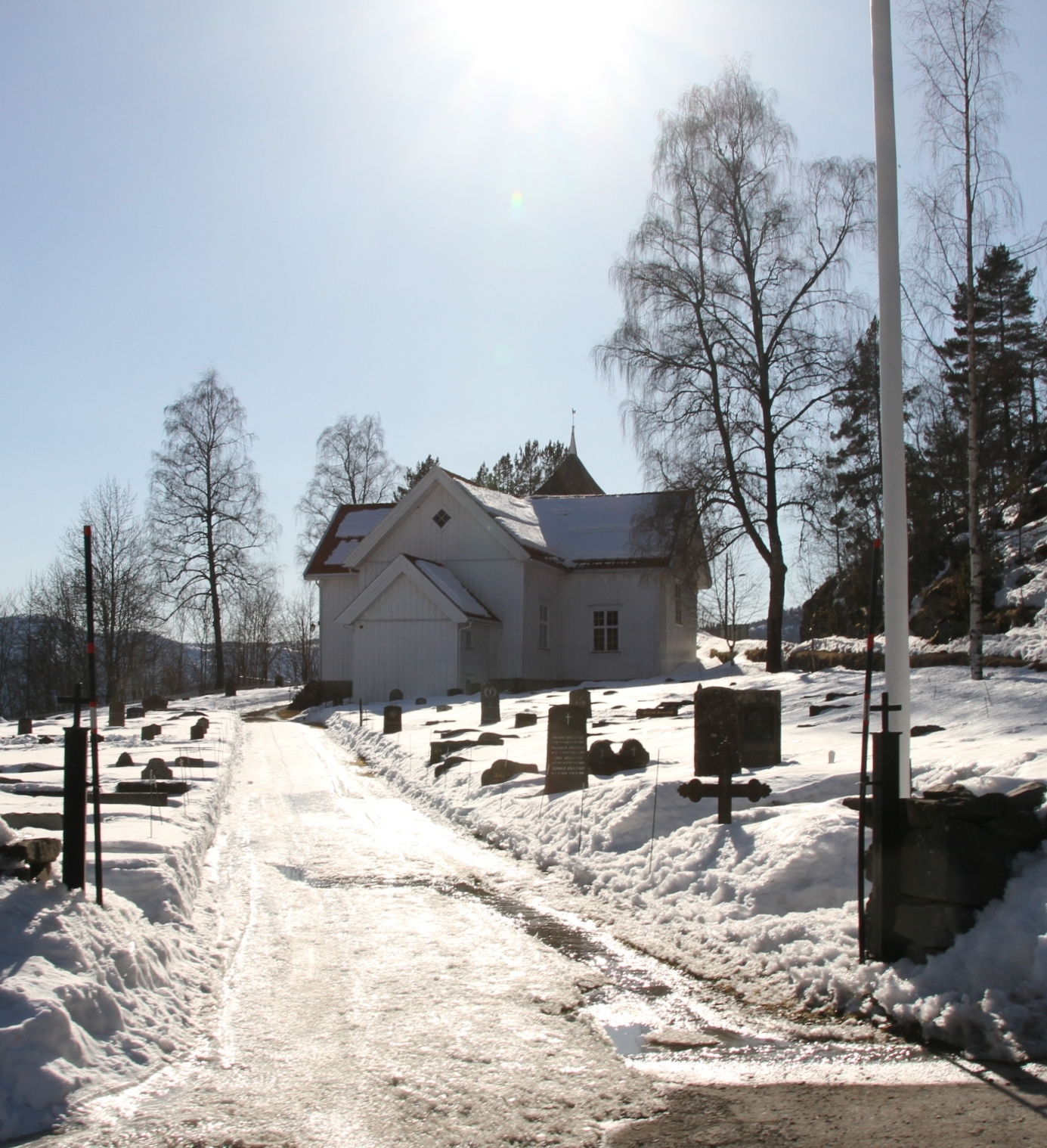

== See also ==
- List of churches in Agder og Telemark
