= Kristiansand Bus Søgne Lines =

Local bus lines in Norway

40 / 42
- Søgne Lines
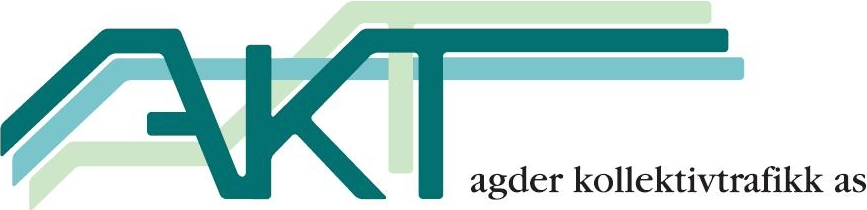

Overview
- System: Agder Kollektiv Transport
- Operator: Nettbuss
- Garage: Mjåvann, Sørlandsparken
- Vehicle: Mercedes-Benz Citaro

Route
- Locale: Kvadraturen - Hannevika - Brennåsen/Vågsbygd - Tangvall
- Start: 40: Kristiansand Bus Terminal; 42: Bus Terminal; 50: Bus Terminal
- Via: Hannevika, (Vågsbygd centrum), Tangvall
- End: 40: Høllen, Årosskogen; 42: Langenes; 50: Tangvall

Service
- Operates: 18 hours (40); 06:10 - 00:10; 18 hours (42); 05:40 - 23:40; 5 hours (50); 07:55 - 16:10
- Transfers: Yes
- Timetable

40 / 42/50 are three local bus lines in Kristiansand, Norway to Søgne. They all go from downtown Kristiansand to the centrum of Søgne and further in the municipality. 40 and 42 goes all day and evening, while line 50 only goes in the rush hours. Line 40 goes ten past the hour and line 42 ten past half. There are extra buses in the rush hours.

== Description ==
=== 40 ===
40 goes from downtown Kristiansand, over Hannevika and follows E39 to Tangvall in Søgne. It then continues from Tangvall to the neighborhoods and the shore Høllen - Årosskogen.

=== 42 ===
42 goes from downtown Kristiansand, over Hannevika and follows E39 to Tangvall in Søgne. It then continues to the neighborhood Langenes.

=== 47 ===
47 is a local bus line in Søgne, collaborating with line 40 and 42. 47 goes to the neighborhoods Eik, Lunde, Vedderheia, Lohne and Trysnes from Tangvall.

=== 48 ===
48 is a local bus line in Søgne served by a mini bus from Tangvall to Ålo.

=== 50 ===
50 goes from downtown Kristiansand to Vågsbygd and follows line Norwegian County Road 456 all the way to Søgne, past Voiebyen in Kristiansand to Langenes in Søgne, then past Søgne High School and ends in Tangvall.

== Night lines ==
In the weekend, the buses goes also during the night which serves the city around 2-3 times from 1 AM to 3 AM. Bus card is not available for use on these lines and it cost extra night fee.

=== N40 ===
The night line N40 and goes from Kristiansand to Tangvall - Lunde - Høllen - Årosskogen.

== Rush hour ==
In the rush hour, line 40 and 42 goes twice as much and continues from downtown Kristiansand to UiA.

== Roads ==
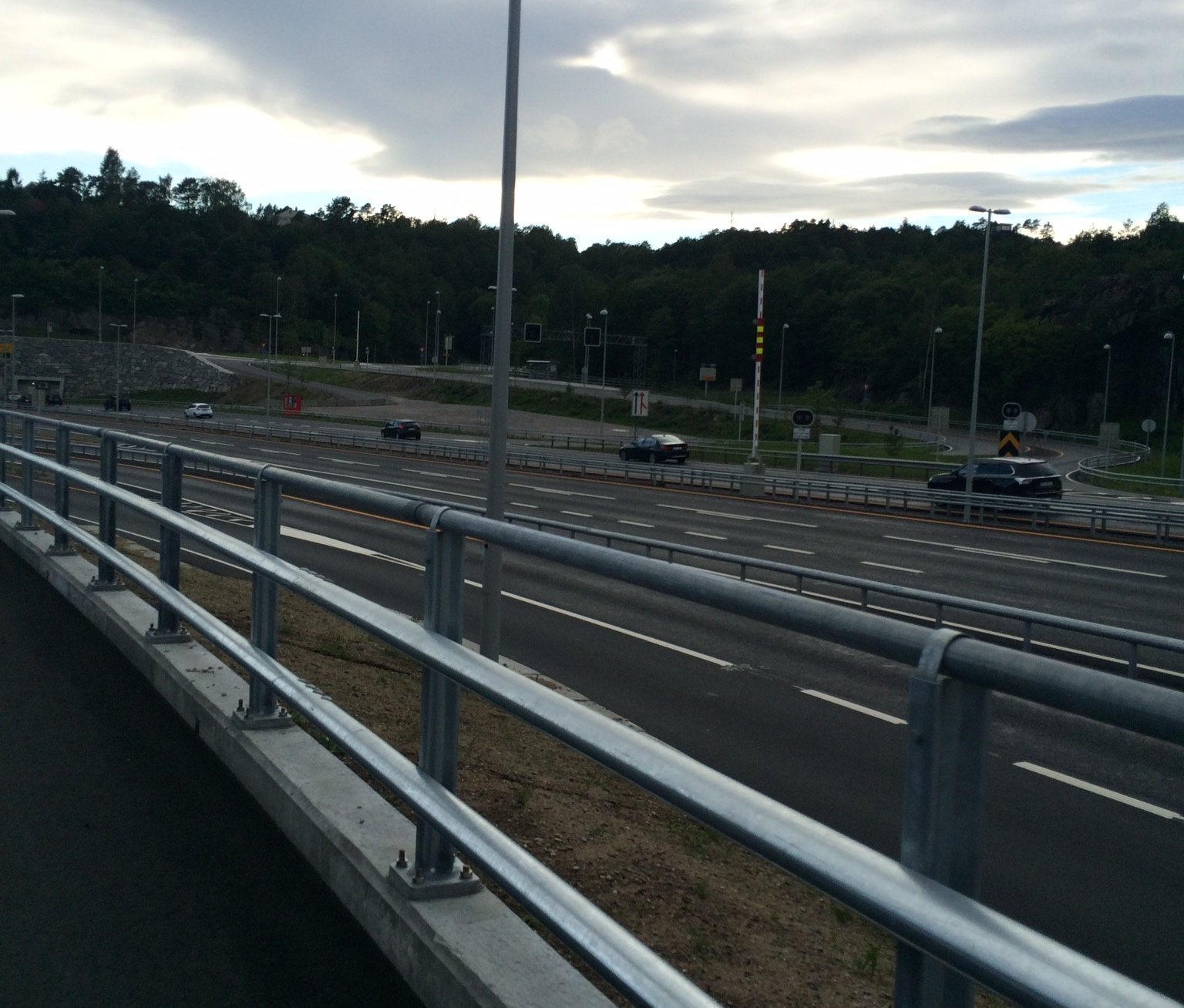
European Route E39 is used by line 40 and 42 all the way to Søgne from Kristiansand

The lines uses some notable roads in Kristiansand. The following are:

Route	Lines	Stretch
E39	40, 42, 50	Kvadraturen - Hannevika
Fv456	50	Hannevika - Stausland
Fv162	50	Stausland - Tangvall
E39	40, 42	Hannevika - Tangvall
Fv456	40, 42	Tangvall - Stausland
Fv152	40	Stausland - Årosskogen
Fv456	42	Stausland - Langenes
