= Søgne Municipality =

Former municipality in Vest-Agder, Norway

Søgne Municipality Søgne kommune
- Former municipality
- Sygne herred (historic name)
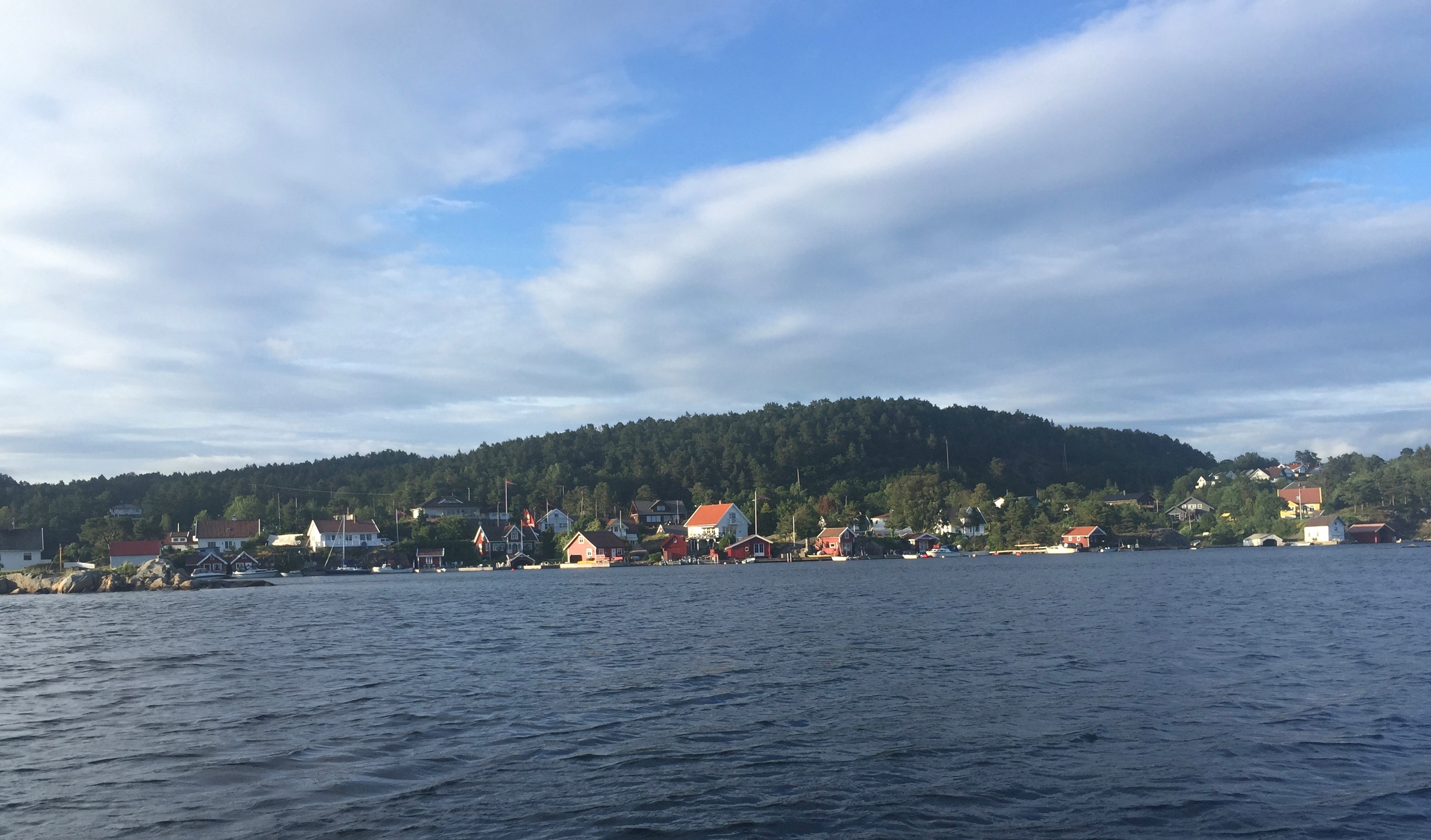
- View of Trysnes in Søgne

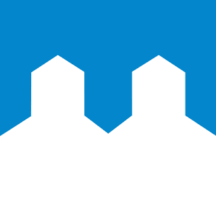
- Flag Coat of arms

- Vest-Agder within Norway

- Søgne within Vest-Agder
- Coordinates: 58°05′39″N 07°46′21″E
- Country: Norway
- County: Vest-Agder
- District: Sørlandet
- Established: 1 Jan 1838
  - Created as: Formannskapsdistrikt
- Disestablished: 1 Jan 2020
  - Succeeded by: Kristiansand Municipality
- Administrative centre: Tangvall

Government
  - Mayor (2015–2019): Astrid Hilde (Ap)

Area (upon dissolution)
  - Total: 151.42 km^{2} (58.46 sq mi)
  - Land: 144.17 km^{2} (55.66 sq mi)
  - Water: 7.25 km^{2} (2.80 sq mi) 4.8%
  - Rank: #354 in Norway
- Highest elevation: 278 m (912 ft)

Population (2019)
  - Total: 11,403
  - Rank: #104 in Norway
  - Density: 79.1/km^{2} (205/sq mi)
  - Change (10 years): ▲ +9.5%
- Demonym: Søgnesokning

Official language
  - Norwegian form: Bokmål
- Time zone: UTC+01:00 (CET)
  - Summer (DST): UTC+02:00 (CEST)
- ISO 3166 code: NO-1018

Søgne is a former municipality in the old Vest-Agder county, Norway. The 151-square-kilometre (58 sq mi) municipality existed from 1838 until its dissolution in 2020. The area is now part of Kristiansand Municipality in Agder county. The administrative centre was the village of Tangvall. Other villages and residential areas in the municipality included Ausviga, Eik, Høllen, Langenes, Lone, Lunde, Ny-Hellesund, Trysnes, Vedderheia, Ålo, and Åros.

Prior to its dissolution in 2020, the 151.42-square-kilometre (58.46 sq mi) municipality was the 354th largest by area out of the 422 municipalities in Norway. Søgne Municipality was the 104th most populous municipality in Norway with a population of about 11,403. The municipality's population density was 79.1 inhabitants per square kilometre (205/sq mi) and its population had increased by 9.5% over the previous 10-year period.

== General information ==
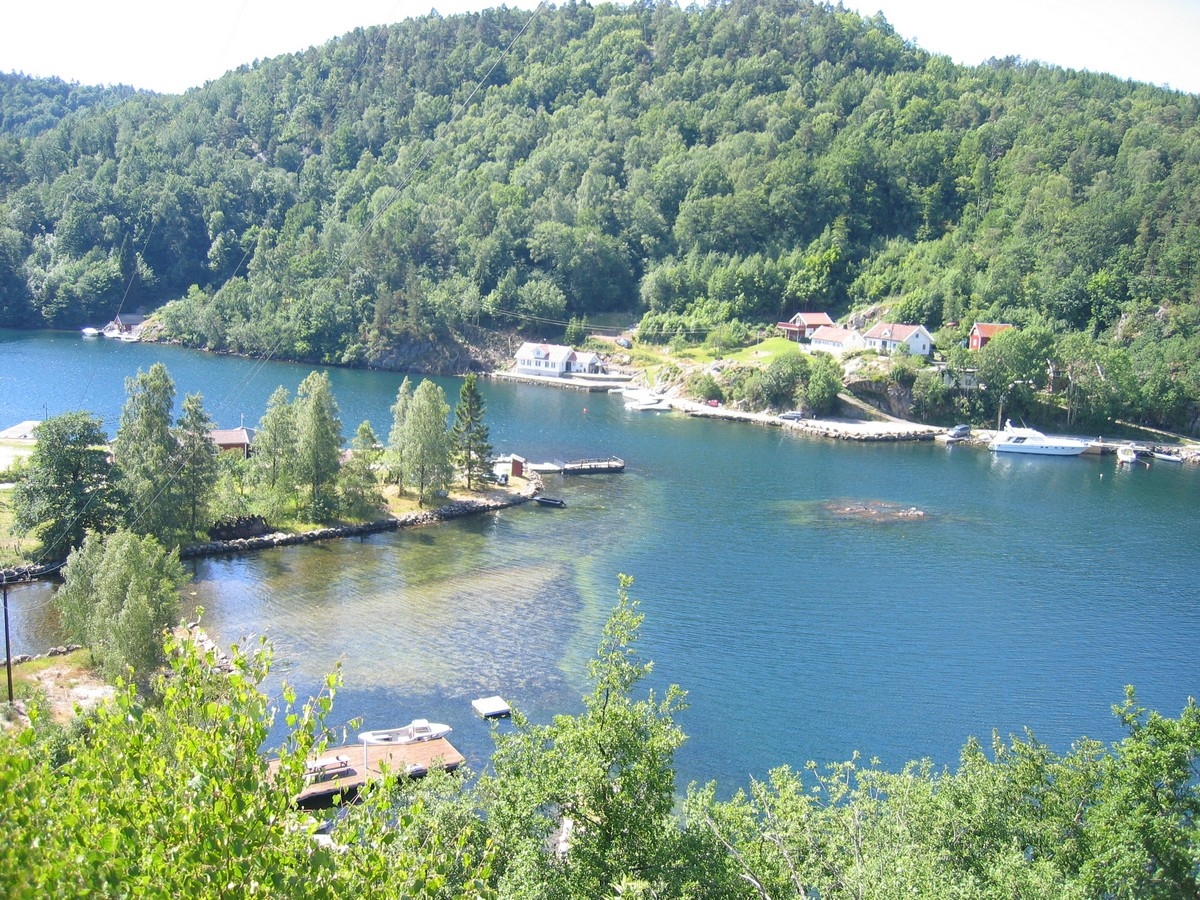
View of the coastline of Søgne

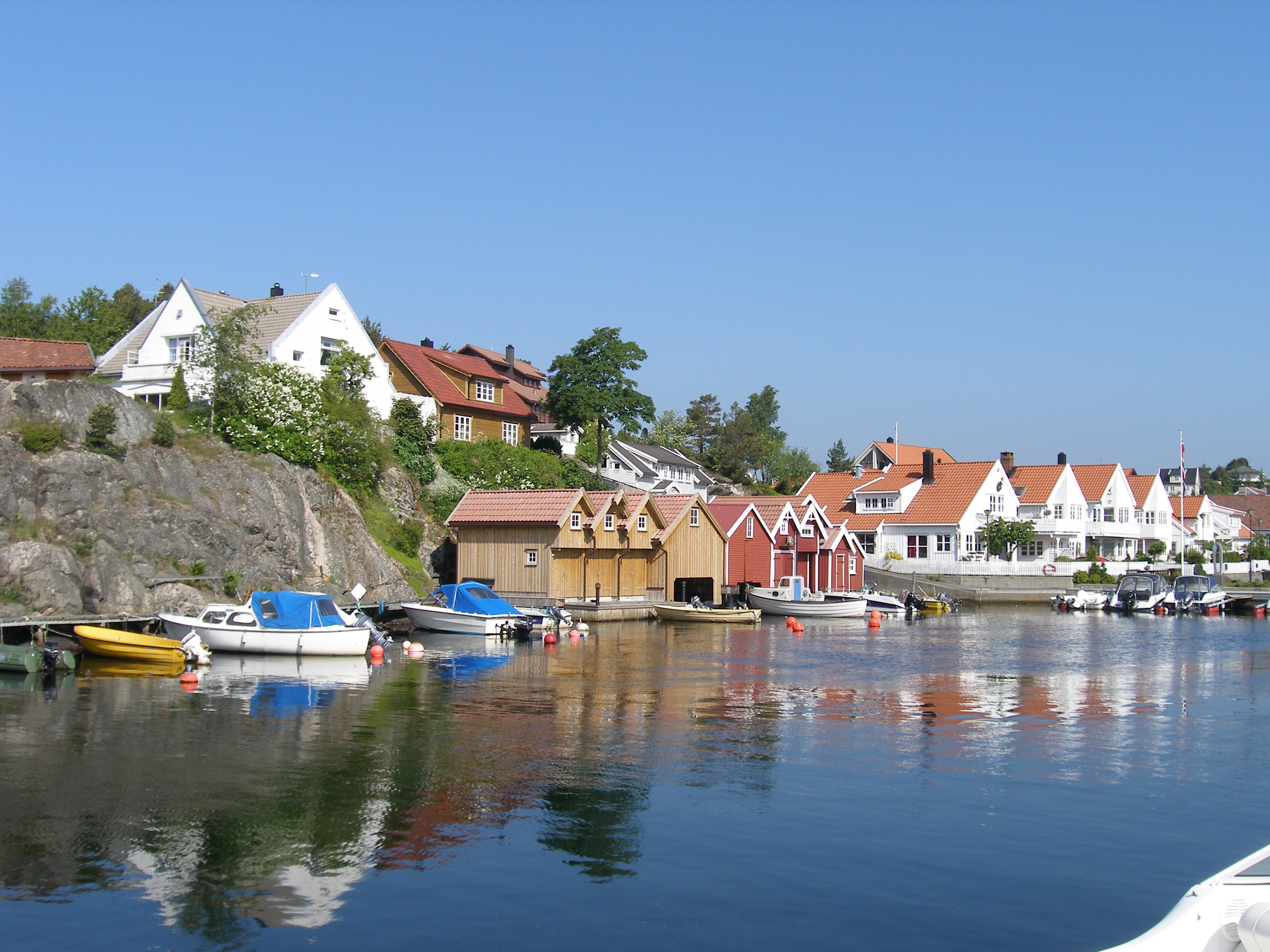
View of the harbour at Høllen

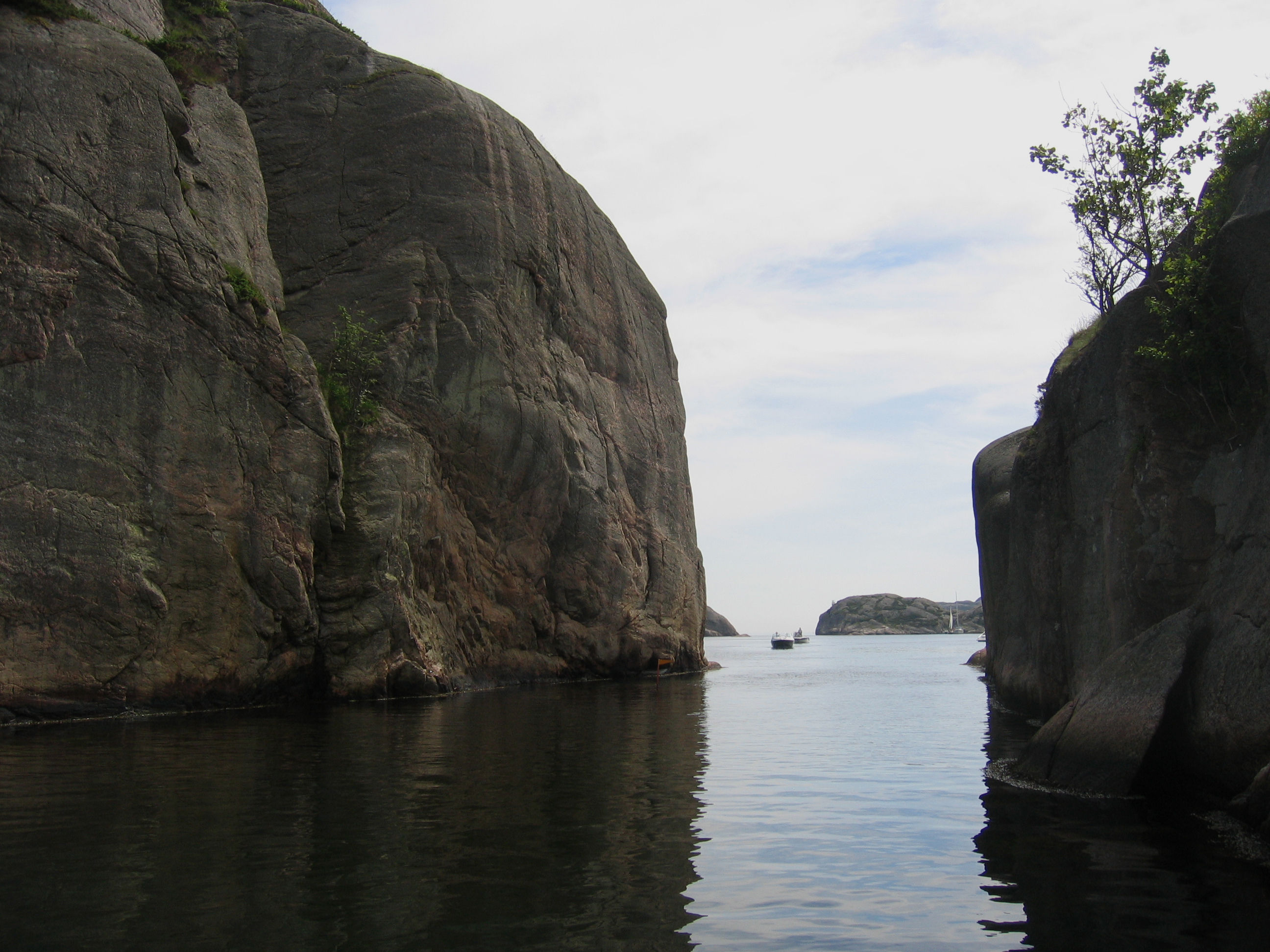
View of the cliffs of Ny-Hellesund

The parish of Sygne (later spelled Søgne) was established as a municipality on 1 January 1838 (see formannskapsdistrikt law). On 1 July 1913, Søgne Municipality was divided as follows: the northeastern district (population: 822) became the new Greipstad Municipality and the southwestern district (population: 2,609) continued as a smaller Søgne Municipality.

During the 1960s, there were many municipal mergers and border adjustments across Norway due to the work of the Schei Committee. Søgne Municipality remained generally the same during this time, however, there were three small changes to the municipal boundaries. The following areas were added to Søgne Municipality:

- on 1 January 1964, the Stubstad area of Holum Municipality (population: 9)
- on 1 January 1964, the Brunvatne area of Øyslebø Municipality (population: 44)
- on 1 January 1965, the Svalemyren area of Mandal Municipality (population: 0)

In 2020, there were many municipal and county mergers across Norway due to the work of the Solberg cabinet. On 1 January 2020, Søgne Municipality was dissolved and the following areas were merged to form an enlarged Kristiansand Municipality:

- all of Søgne Municipality (population: 11,403)
- all of Kristiansand Municipality (population: 92,282)
- all of Songdalen Municipality (population: 6,706)

=== Name ===
The municipality (originally the parish) is named after the old Søgne farm (Old Norse: Sygna) since the Old Søgne Church was built there. The name comes from the local river Sygna (now called Søgneelva). The river name is derived from the verb súga which means "to suck". The municipality was historically spelled Sygne until the 1880s when it was changed to Søgne.

=== Coat of arms ===
The coat of arms was granted on 24 May 1985 and they were in use until 1 January 2020 when the municipality was dissolved. The official blazon is "Per fess urdy azure and argent, two points to the chief" (Norwegian: Delt av blått og sølv ved gråverksnitt (med to spisser oppover)). This means the arms have a field (background) that is divided by a line that follows a geometric "urdy" pattern. Below the line, the field has a tincture of azure (blue). Above the line, the field has a tincture of argent which means it is commonly colored white, but if it is made out of metal, then silver is used. The design of the line is meant to symbolize two stone road markers (varder), which in historical times were used to mark the paths and tracks that people followed. Two of the largest of these signs are found in the municipality, and were mentioned in historical records in the early 17th century. According to legend, they were built by King Olaf II of Norway (Hellige-Olav), in the 11th century. A local tradition says they represent two girls standing on top of the hill looking for their lovers to return from fishing. The fishermen drowned and the girls remained waiting there. The stone markers are named "jentene på Hellerøya" (the girls on Heller island). The original stone markers were destroyed by Germans during World War II and afterwards they were rebuilt in concrete. The arms were designed by Ulf Skauge based on idea by Nols Th. Finstad.

=== Churches ===
The Church of Norway has one parish (sokn) within Søgne Municipality. It is part of the Mandal prosti (deanery) in the Diocese of Agder og Telemark.

Churches in Søgne Municipality
Parish (sokn)	Church name	Location of the church	Year built
Søgne	Søgne Church	Lunde	1861
Søgne	Old Søgne Church	Søgne	1604

== Government ==
While it existed, Søgne Municipality was responsible for primary education (through 10th grade), outpatient health services, senior citizen services, welfare and other social services, zoning, economic development, and municipal roads and utilities. The municipality was governed by a municipal council of directly elected representatives. The mayor was indirectly elected by a vote of the municipal council. The municipality was under the jurisdiction of the Kristiansand District Court and the Agder Court of Appeal.

=== Municipal council ===
The municipal council (Kommunestyre) of Søgne Municipality was made up of 27 representatives that were elected to four year terms. The tables below show the historical composition of the council by political party.

Søgne kommunestyre 2015–2019
Party name (in Norwegian)	Number of representatives
Labour Party (Arbeiderpartiet)	8
Progress Party (Fremskrittspartiet)	5
Green Party (Miljøpartiet De Grønne)	1
Conservative Party (Høyre)	6
Christian Democratic Party (Kristelig Folkeparti)	3
Centre Party (Senterpartiet)	1
Socialist Left Party (Sosialistisk Venstreparti)	1
Liberal Party (Venstre)	2
Total number of members:	27
Note: On 1 January 2020, Søgne Municipality became part of Kristiansand Municipality.

Søgne kommunestyre 2011–2015
Party name (in Norwegian)	Number of representatives
Labour Party (Arbeiderpartiet)	6
Progress Party (Fremskrittspartiet)	5
Conservative Party (Høyre)	9
Christian Democratic Party (Kristelig Folkeparti)	3
Centre Party (Senterpartiet)	1
Socialist Left Party (Sosialistisk Venstreparti)	1
Liberal Party (Venstre)	2
Total number of members:	27

Søgne kommunestyre 2007–2011
Party name (in Norwegian)	Number of representatives
Labour Party (Arbeiderpartiet)	6
Progress Party (Fremskrittspartiet)	6
Conservative Party (Høyre)	5
Christian Democratic Party (Kristelig Folkeparti)	4
Pensioners' Party (Pensjonistpartiet)	1
Centre Party (Senterpartiet)	1
Socialist Left Party (Sosialistisk Venstreparti)	1
Liberal Party (Venstre)	3
Total number of members:	27

Søgne kommunestyre 2003–2007
Party name (in Norwegian)	Number of representatives
Labour Party (Arbeiderpartiet)	5
Progress Party (Fremskrittspartiet)	5
Conservative Party (Høyre)	6
Christian Democratic Party (Kristelig Folkeparti)	3
Centre Party (Senterpartiet)	1
Socialist Left Party (Sosialistisk Venstreparti)	3
Liberal Party (Venstre)	2
Total number of members:	25

Søgne kommunestyre 1999–2003
Party name (in Norwegian)	Number of representatives
Labour Party (Arbeiderpartiet)	4
Progress Party (Fremskrittspartiet)	3
Conservative Party (Høyre)	8
Christian Democratic Party (Kristelig Folkeparti)	5
Centre Party (Senterpartiet)	1
Socialist Left Party (Sosialistisk Venstreparti)	2
Liberal Party (Venstre)	2
Total number of members:	25

Søgne kommunestyre 1995–1999
Party name (in Norwegian)	Number of representatives
Labour Party (Arbeiderpartiet)	5
Progress Party (Fremskrittspartiet)	2
Conservative Party (Høyre)	8
Christian Democratic Party (Kristelig Folkeparti)	4
Centre Party (Senterpartiet)	2
Socialist Left Party (Sosialistisk Venstreparti)	1
Liberal Party (Venstre)	2
Søgne local list (Søgne bygdeliste)	1
Total number of members:	25

Søgne kommunestyre 1991–1995
Party name (in Norwegian)	Number of representatives
Labour Party (Arbeiderpartiet)	4
Progress Party (Fremskrittspartiet)	2
Conservative Party (Høyre)	7
Christian Democratic Party (Kristelig Folkeparti)	4
Centre Party (Senterpartiet)	2
Socialist Left Party (Sosialistisk Venstreparti)	2
Liberal Party (Venstre)	2
Søgne local list (Søgne bygdelist)	2
Total number of members:	25

Søgne kommunestyre 1987–1991
Party name (in Norwegian)	Number of representatives
Labour Party (Arbeiderpartiet)	5
Conservative Party (Høyre)	10
Christian Democratic Party (Kristelig Folkeparti)	4
Centre Party (Senterpartiet)	1
Liberal Party (Venstre)	3
Søgne local list (Søgne Bygdeliste)	2
Total number of members:	25

Søgne kommunestyre 1983–1987
Party name (in Norwegian)	Number of representatives
Labour Party (Arbeiderpartiet)	6
Conservative Party (Høyre)	10
Christian Democratic Party (Kristelig Folkeparti)	4
Centre Party (Senterpartiet)	1
Liberal Party (Venstre)	1
Søgne local list (Søgne Bygdeliste)	3
Total number of members:	25

Søgne kommunestyre 1979–1983
Party name (in Norwegian)	Number of representatives
Labour Party (Arbeiderpartiet)	5
Conservative Party (Høyre)	9
Christian Democratic Party (Kristelig Folkeparti)	5
Centre Party (Senterpartiet)	2
Liberal Party (Venstre)	2
Søgne local list (Søgne bygdeliste)	2
Total number of members:	25

Søgne kommunestyre 1975–1979
Party name (in Norwegian)	Number of representatives
Labour Party (Arbeiderpartiet)	5
Anders Lange's Party (Anders Langes parti)	1
Conservative Party (Høyre)	7
Christian Democratic Party (Kristelig Folkeparti)	5
New People's Party (Nye Folkepartiet)	2
Centre Party (Senterpartiet)	2
Liberal Party (Venstre)	1
Søgne local list (Søgne Bygdeliste)	2
Total number of members:	25

Søgne kommunestyre 1971–1975
Party name (in Norwegian)	Number of representatives
Labour Party (Arbeiderpartiet)	6
Conservative Party (Høyre)	5
Christian Democratic Party (Kristelig Folkeparti)	4
Centre Party (Senterpartiet)	2
Liberal Party (Venstre)	4
Local List(s) (Lokale lister)	4
Total number of members:	25

Søgne kommunestyre 1968–1971
Party name (in Norwegian)	Number of representatives
Labour Party (Arbeiderpartiet)	5
Conservative Party (Høyre)	3
Christian Democratic Party (Kristelig Folkeparti)	2
Centre Party (Senterpartiet)	2
Liberal Party (Venstre)	5
Total number of members:	17

Søgne kommunestyre 1964–1967
Party name (in Norwegian)	Number of representatives
Labour Party (Arbeiderpartiet)	5
Conservative Party (Høyre)	3
Christian Democratic Party (Kristelig Folkeparti)	2
Centre Party (Senterpartiet)	2
Liberal Party (Venstre)	5
Total number of members:	17

Søgne herredsstyre 1959–1963
Party name (in Norwegian)	Number of representatives
Labour Party (Arbeiderpartiet)	5
Conservative Party (Høyre)	2
Christian Democratic Party (Kristelig Folkeparti)	2
Centre Party (Senterpartiet)	2
Liberal Party (Venstre)	5
Local List(s) (Lokale lister)	1
Total number of members:	17

Søgne herredsstyre 1955–1959
Party name (in Norwegian)	Number of representatives
Labour Party (Arbeiderpartiet)	4
Conservative Party (Høyre)	3
Christian Democratic Party (Kristelig Folkeparti)	2
Farmers' Party (Bondepartiet)	4
Liberal Party (Venstre)	5
Local List(s) (Lokale lister)	3
Total number of members:	21

Søgne herredsstyre 1951–1955
Party name (in Norwegian)	Number of representatives
Labour Party (Arbeiderpartiet)	3
Farmers' Party (Bondepartiet)	2
Liberal Party (Venstre)	11
Total number of members:	16

Søgne herredsstyre 1947–1951
Party name (in Norwegian)	Number of representatives
Labour Party (Arbeiderpartiet)	4
Farmers' Party (Bondepartiet)	2
Liberal Party (Venstre)	10
Total number of members:	16

Søgne herredsstyre 1945–1947
Party name (in Norwegian)	Number of representatives
Labour Party (Arbeiderpartiet)	6
Farmers' Party (Bondepartiet)	1
Joint list of the Liberal Party (Venstre) and the Radical People's Party (Radikale Folkepartiet)	8
Local List(s) (Lokale lister)	1
Total number of members:	16

Søgne herredsstyre 1937–1941*
Party name (in Norwegian)	Number of representatives
Labour Party (Arbeiderpartiet)	2
Farmers' Party (Bondepartiet)	3
Liberal Party (Venstre)	10
Joint List(s) of Non-Socialist Parties (Borgerlige Felleslister)	1
Total number of members:	16
Note: Due to the German occupation of Norway during World War II, no elections were held for new municipal councils until after the war ended in 1945.

=== Mayors ===
The mayor (Norwegian: ordfører) of Søgne Municipality was the political leader of the municipality and the chairperson of the municipal council. The following people have held this position:

- 1838–1845: Otto Joachim Moltke Hansen
- 1845–1847: Stig Askildsen Eg
- 1848–1851: Asbjørn Olsen Birkeland
- 1851–1852: Otto Joachim Moltke Hansen
- 1852–1853: Nils Nilsen Nodeland
- 1853–1857: Peder Bjørnson
- 1858–1863: Asbjørn Olsen Birkeland
- 1864–1867: Andreas Stokkeland
- 1868–1873: Rasmus Føreid
- 1874–1883: Asbjørn Olsen Birkeland
- 1884–1885: Torkild Holmen
- 1886–1887: Sivert Jørgensen Vige
- 1888–1901: Jakob Brunvatne (V)
- 1902–1904: Hans Jensen Try (H)
- 1905–1907: Jakob Brunvatne (V)
- 1908–1916: Hans Jensen Try (H)
- 1917–1919: Lars Stendahl
- 1919–1922: Søren Dass Brodtkorb Sverdrup (V)
- 1923–1925: Harald Brunvatne (Bp)
- 1926–1928: Hans Jensen Try (H)
- 1929–1931: Harald Brunvatne (Bp)
- 1932–1941: Tarald Eg (V)
- 1941–1943: Dagfinn Eide (NS)
- 1943–1945: Paul Holst (NS)
- 1945–1945: Tarald Eg (V)
- 1946–1951: Jørgen H. Lohne (V)
- 1952–1955: Tarald Eg (V)
- 1956–1963: Jørgen H. Lohne (V)
- 1964–1967: Syvert Tallaksen (V)
- 1968–1971: Thorbjørn Odd Olsen (V)
- 1972–1975: Syvert Tallaksen (V)
- 1976–1991: Bjarne Nesheim (H)
- 1992–2001: Anne Berit Andersen (H)
- 2001–2007: Eli Løite (H)
- 2007–2011: Solveig Kjelland Larsen (Ap)
- 2011–2015: Åse R. Severinsen (H)
- 2015–2019: Astrid Hilde (Ap)

== Media ==
The newspaper Søgne og Songdalen Budstikke has been published in Søgne since 1999.

== Geography ==
Søgne was a small, coastal municipality, with a long stretch of coastline and islands to the south. To the east, it bordered Kristiansand Municipality, to the north and northeast it bordered both Marnardal Municipality and Songdalen Municipality, and to the west it bordered Mandal Municipality.

The municipality had a couple main rivers running through it: Lundeelva and Søgneelva. The Trysfjorden cut into the shoreline in the west part of the municipality. There were also many islands to the south of the mainland. Ny-Hellesund is a small cluster of three populated islands that were an important outport in the history of Søgne. The Songvår Lighthouse was located in the far south part of the municipality on the small island of Hellersøya. The highest point in the municipality was the 278-metre (912 ft) tall mountain Spjotheia.

=== Climate ===
Climate data for Søgne
Month	Jan	Feb	Mar	Apr	May	Jun	Jul	Aug	Sep	Oct	Nov	Dec	Year
Daily mean °C (°F)	−0.1 (31.8)	−0.5 (31.1)	1.7 (35.1)	5.0 (41.0)	10.0 (50.0)	13.9 (57.0)	15.5 (59.9)	15.1 (59.2)	12.0 (53.6)	8.7 (47.7)	4.3 (39.7)	1.5 (34.7)	7.3 (45.1)
Average precipitation mm (inches)	137 (5.4)	90 (3.5)	99 (3.9)	66 (2.6)	89 (3.5)	81 (3.2)	93 (3.7)	127 (5.0)	154 (6.1)	177 (7.0)	176 (6.9)	131 (5.2)	1,420 (55.9)
Source: Norwegian Meteorological Institute

== Notable people ==
- Dina Larsen (1873–1961), domestic science teacher and civil servant
- Hans Try (1934–1990), archivist and historian

== See also ==
- List of former municipalities of Norway
