= Søgne =

Søgne may refer to:

== Places ==
- Søgne (village), an urban village area in Kristiansand Municipality in Agder county, Norway
- Søgne, Kristiansand, a borough in Kristiansand Municipality in Agder county, Norway
- Søgne Municipality, a former municipality in the old Vest-Agder county, Norway
- Søgne Church, a church in Kristiansand Municipality in Agder county, Norway
- Old Søgne Church, a church in Kristiansand Municipality in Agder county, Norway
- Søgne River, or Søgneelva, a river in Kristiansand Municipality in Agder county, Norway

== Other ==
- Søgne FK, a sports club based in Kristiansand Municipality in Agder county, Norway
- Søgne Tunnel, a road tunnel in Kristiansand Municipality in Agder county, Norway
