= Kristiansand Bus Terminal =

Bus station in Kristiansand, Norway

Coordinates: 58.1450°N 7.9903°E

Kristiansand Rutebilstasjon
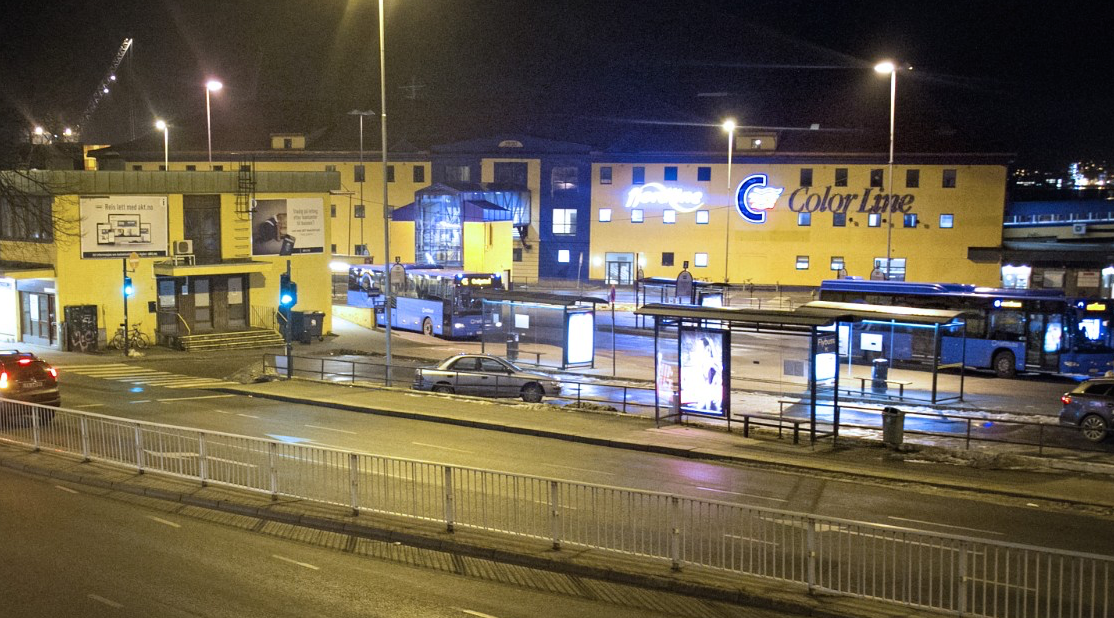

General information
- Location: Vestre Strandgate, Kvadraturen, Kristiansand; Norway
- Connections: Train: Kristiansand Station; Bus: Boreal Buss

History
- Opened: 1965
Location

Kristiansand Bus Terminal (Norwegian: Kristiansand Rutebilstasjon) is the main bus terminal serving Kristiansand, Norway. It has bus lines to many places, including Oslo and Stavanger. The bus terminal is located next to Kristiansand Station and the city harbor. It was built between 1960 and 1965.

== New terminal ==
In 2017, Kristiansand Municipality hosted a competition for architects to draw a new building to replace the old and outdated building from 1960. Asplan Viak's suggestion 'Natteravnen' was chosen as the winner, and construction was started in 2018 with plans to complete the new building by late 2019. PK Entreprenør from Søgne Municipality are responsible for building the new terminal. The existing building will be demolished when the new is completed, and replaced by a small park and green-spaces.

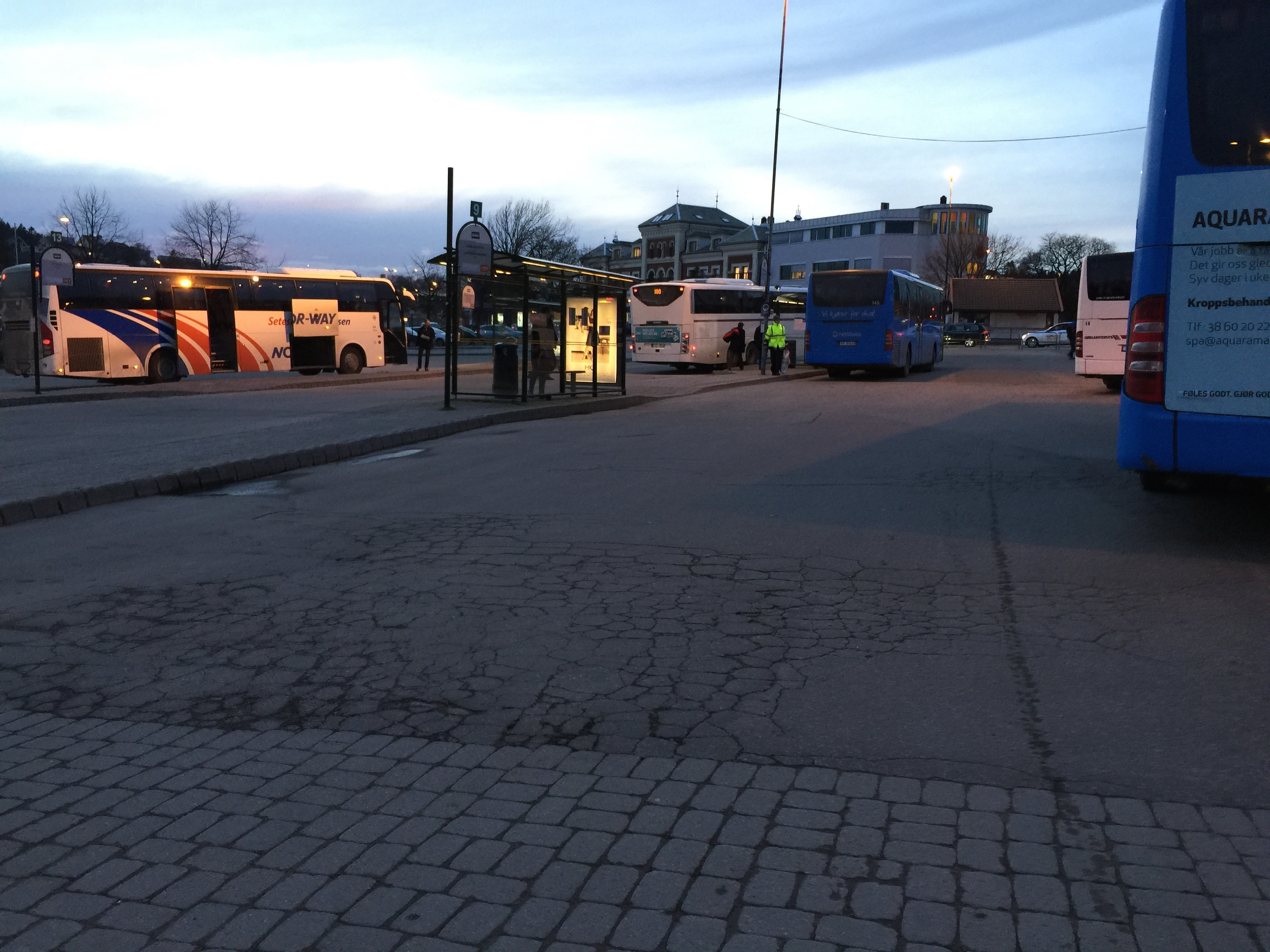
The bus holding stops with Kristiansand Station in the background

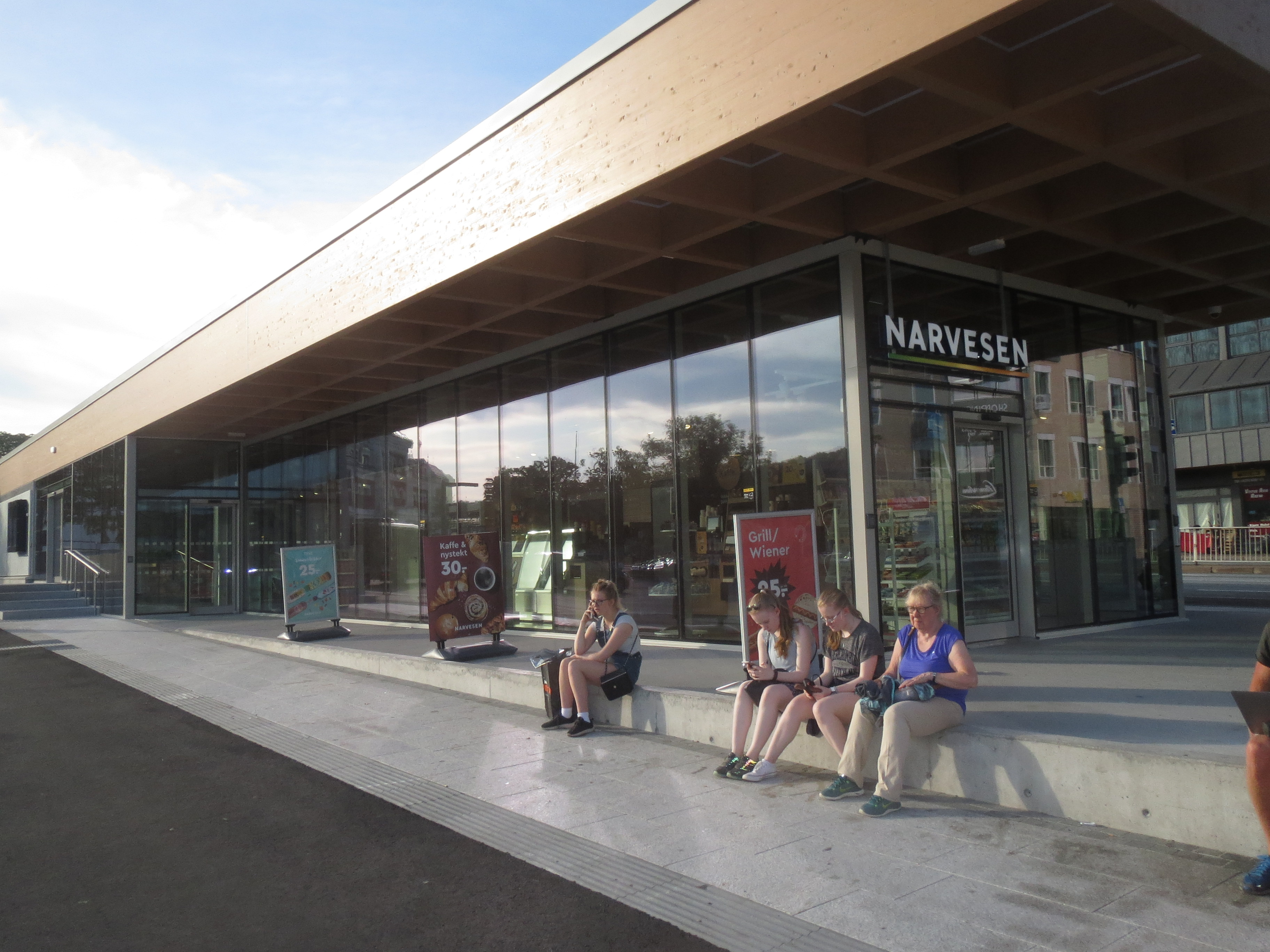
The new terminal building

== Platforms ==
Rutebilstasjonen	Vestre Strandgate	H. Wergelandsgate
1 - 14	A - B	C - I

Bus lines from Rutebilstasjonen

Line	Route	Carrier	Platform
M1	Sørlandsparken-Dyreparken-IKEA	Boreal Buss	14
M2	Hånes - Lauvåsen - Sørlandsparken	Boreal Buss	14
M3	Søm	Boreal Buss	14
M4	Tømmerstø	Boreal Buss	14
10	Eg - Sykehuset	Boreal Buss	3
12	Justvik	Boreal Buss	14
A25	Varodd - Mjåvann	Boreal Buss	4
31	Vennesla - Grovane	Boreal Buss	4
35	Kjevik - Brattvollsheia	Boreal Buss	4
36	Tveit - Birkeland	Boreal Buss	4
40	Tangvall - Høllen - Åros	Boreal Buss	4
40E	Tangvall - Åros	Boreal Buss	4
40E	Kvadraturen - UiA	Boreal Buss	14
51	Kvadraturen - UiA	Boreal Buss	14
45	Nodelandsheia	Boreal Buss	4
46	Finsland	Boreal Buss	4
100	Lillesand - Grimstad (- Fevik) - Arendal	Setesdal Bilruter	7
100D	Arendal ekspressavgang	Setesdal Bilruter	7
100E	Grimstad ekspressavgang	Setesdal Bilruter	7
139	Høvåg - Lillesand	Setesdal Bilruter	13
170	Evje - Hovden - Haukeli	Setesdal Bilruter	8
200	Mandal - Lyngdal	Setesdal Bilruter	3
VY190	Oslo	Vy Buss	12
NW192	Oslo	Konkurrenten	9
N651	Oslo	FlixBus	9

Bus lines from Vestre Strandgate & H. Wergelandsgate

Line	Route	Carrier	Platform
M1	Flekkerøy	Boreal Buss	B
A26	Banehei Tunnel - Sørlandsparken - Dyreparken - IKEA	Boreal Buss	C
M2	Voiebyen	Boreal Buss	B
A2	Banehei Tunnel - Hånes - Lauvåsen	Boreal Buss	C
M3	Slettheia	Boreal Buss	B
A3	Søm	Boreal Buss	C
M4	Hellemyr	Boreal Buss	B
12	Kjos Haveby - Vågsbygd senter	Boreal Buss	B
13	Grimsmyra	Boreal Buss	A
13	Lund	Boreal Buss	E
15	Tinnheia	Boreal Buss	A
15	Lund - UiA	Boreal Buss	E
19	Suldalen	Boreal Buss	A
19	Gimlekollen	Boreal Buss	E
30	Mosby - Vennesla - Samkom	Boreal Buss	A
32	Høietun	Boreal Buss	A

Night bus lines

Line	Route	Carrier	Platform
N2	Voiebyen - Flekkerøy	Boreal Buss	B
N3	Slettheia	Boreal Buss	B
N3	Søm	Boreal Buss	C
N2	Hånes	Boreal Buss	C
N4	Tømmerstø (Holte)	Boreal Buss	C
N30	Mosby - Vennesla - Vennesla	Boreal Buss	A
N40	Søgne - Årosskogen	Boreal Buss	4
N45	Nodelandsheia	Boreal Buss	4
N101	Lillesand - Grimstad - Fevik - Arendal - Eydehavn	Setesdal Bilruter	7
