= Songvår Lighthouse =

Coastal lighthouse in Norway

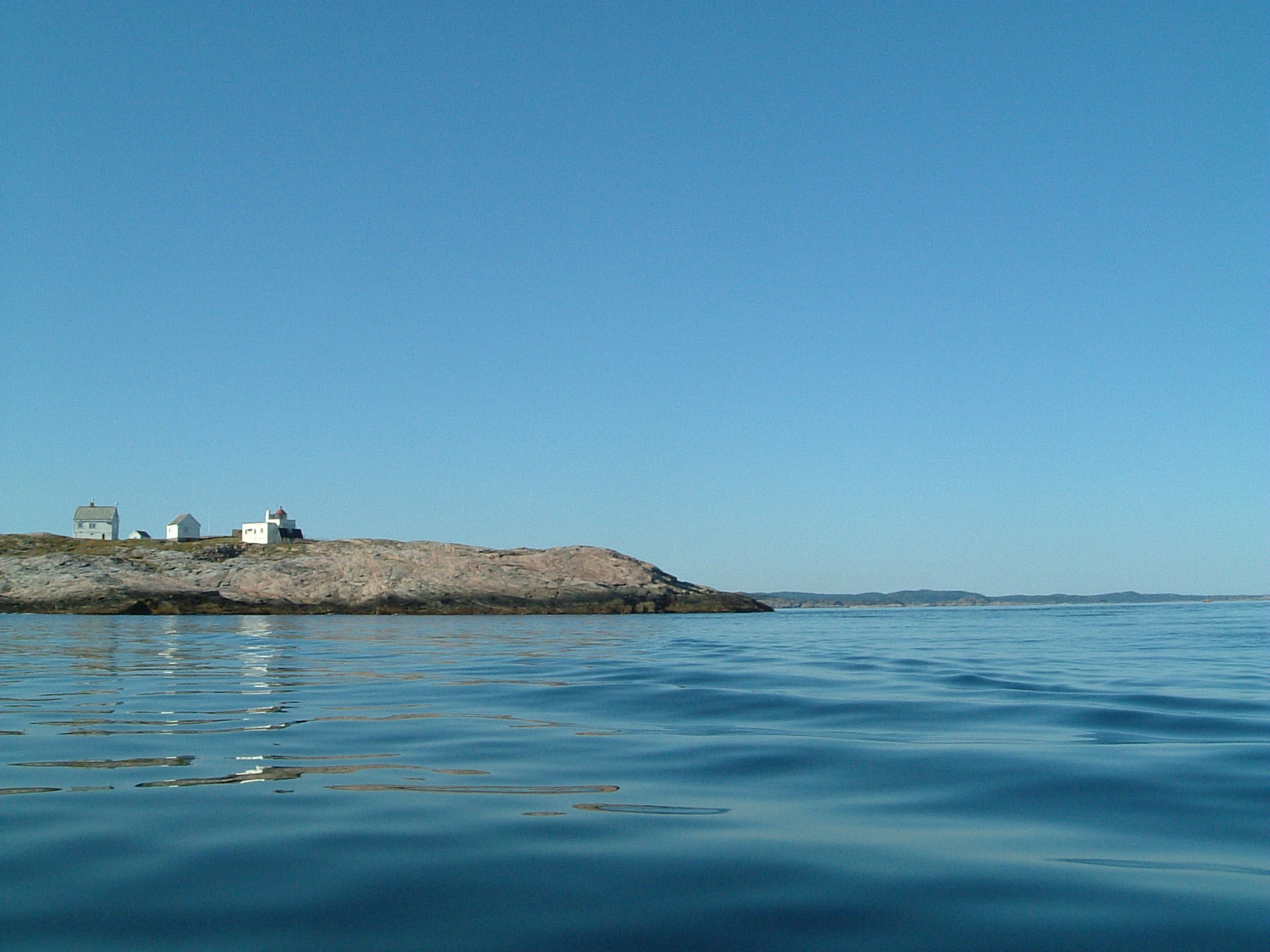
- View of the lighthouse
- Location: Agder, Norway
- Coordinates: 58°00′54″N 07°48′34″E

Tower
- Constructed: 1955
- Automated: 2004
- Height: 5 metres (16 ft)
- Shape: Round
- Markings: White with red stripe

Light
- First lit: 1888
- Focal height: 23.7 metres (78 ft)
- Range: 10.7 nmi (19.8 km; 12.3 mi)
- Characteristic: Fl 3
- Norway no.: 074000

Songvår Lighthouse (Norwegian: Songvår fyrstasjon) is a coastal lighthouse in Kristiansand Municipality in Agder county, Norway. The lighthouse sits on the island of Hellersøya, about 7 kilometres (4.3 mi) south of the village of Høllen. The lighthouse was first built in 1888, and in 1955 a new lighthouse was constructed. The lighthouse was closed in 2004 and replaced with a smaller automated light tower, just southeast of the existing lighthouse.

The present light was built in 2004 and it sits on top of a 5-metre (16 ft) tall tower. The white, red, or green light (depending on direction) sits at an elevation of 24 metres (79 ft) above sea level. The light can be seen for up to 10.7 nmi (19.8 km; 12.3 mi). The lights are on a 3 seconds on / 3 seconds off flashing sequence. The tower is white with one red stripe on it.

The previous lighthouse is still standing, but it has not been used since 2004. That lighthouse was built in 1955. It is a 10-metre (33 ft) tall tower rising from one end of the keeper's house. The building was restored by Søgne Municipality (owned by Kristiansand Municipality since 2020) and it can be rented for overnight stays. The site is only accessible by boat. The ruins of the foundation of the 1888 (original) lighthouse can still be seen near the newer lighthouse.

== See also ==
- Lighthouses in Norway
- List of lighthouses in Norway
