= Trysnes =

Village in Kristiansand Municipality, Norway

- Village
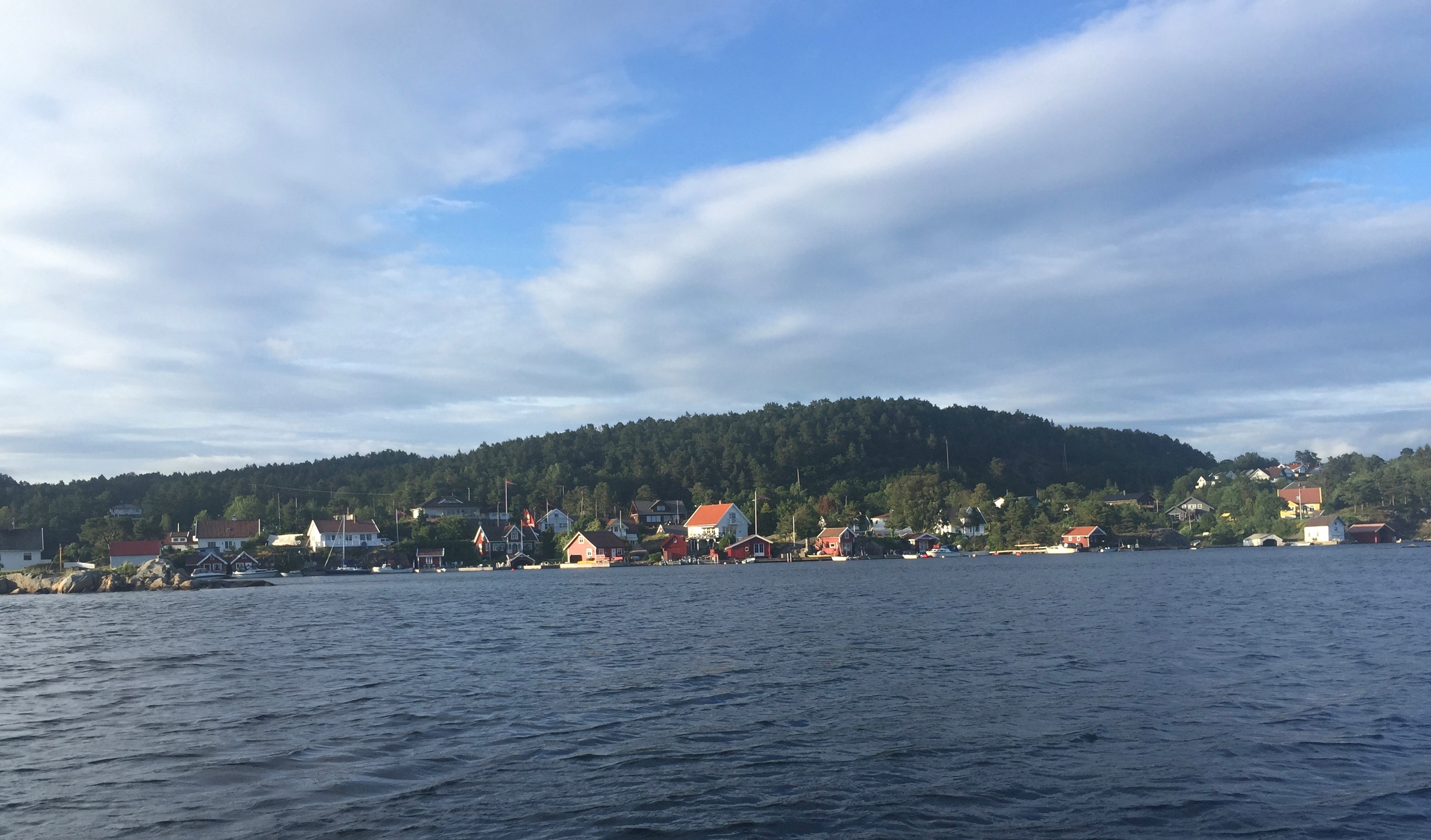
- View of the Trysfjorden
- Interactive map of Trysnes
- Coordinates: 58.05999°N 7.705°E
- Country: Norway
- Region: Southern Norway
- County: Agder
- Municipality: Kristiansand Municipality
- Elevation: 7 m (23 ft)
- Time zone: UTC+01:00 (CET)
  - Summer (DST): UTC+02:00 (CEST)
- Post Code: 4641 Søgne

Trysnes is a village in Kristiansand Municipality in Agder county, Norway. The village is located along the Trysfjorden, about 2 kilometres (1.2 mi) east of the small village of Ålo on the opposite side of the fjord. The villages of Tangvall, Lunde, Ausviga, and Høllen all lie about 8 kilometres (5.0 mi) to the east of Trysnes.
