= Lunde, Kristiansand =

Village in Kristiansand Municipality, Norway

Lunde
- Village
- Interactive map of Lunde
- Coordinates: 58.09568°N 7.78238°E
- Country: Norway
- Region: Southern Norway
- County: Agder
- Municipality: Kristiansand Municipality
- Elevation: 6 m (20 ft)
- Time zone: UTC+01:00 (CET)
  - Summer (DST): UTC+02:00 (CEST)
- Post Code: 4640 Søgne

Lunde is a village in Kristiansand Municipality in Agder county, Norway. The village is located along the European route E39 highway and along the river Lundeelva. The village is surrounded by several other villages that together form the greater Søgne urban area. The village of Lone lies about 2 kilometres (1.2 mi) to the west, the village of Vedderheia lies about 1 kilometre (0.62 mi) to the north, the village of Eig lies about 1 kilometre (0.62 mi) to the southeast, and the village of Tangvall lies about 2 kilometres (1.2 mi) to the east. The village of Ausviga lies about 2 kilometres (1.2 mi) to the south, but it is not part of the greater Søgne urban area. There is an elementary school in Lunde.

As a part of the greater Søgne urban area, separate population statistics are not tracked for Lunde. Altogether, the 6.59-square-kilometre (1,630-acre) urban area has a population (2025) of 11,442 and a population density of 1,736 inhabitants per square kilometre (4,500/sq mi).

== History ==
The village of Lunde was the administrative centre of Søgne Municipality until 1974 when it was moved to neighboring village of Tangvall. Lunde is also the site of the "new" Søgne Church which was built in 1861 to replace the Old Søgne Church located a few kilometers away.
