= Vedderheia =

Village in Kristiansand Municipality, Norway

- Village
- Interactive map of Vedderheia
- Coordinates: 58.1046°N 7.76258°E
- Country: Norway
- Region: Southern Norway
- County: Agder
- Municipality: Kristiansand Municipality
- Elevation: 103 m (338 ft)
- Time zone: UTC+01:00 (CET)
  - Summer (DST): UTC+02:00 (CEST)
- Post Code: 4642 Søgne

Vedderheia is a village in Kristiansand Municipality in Agder county, Norway. The village is located about 1 kilometre (0.62 mi) north of the village of Lunde. The area is entirely a residential community with most people working in the nearby villages of Lunde, Høllen, and Tangvall.

The 0.1-square-kilometre (25-acre) village had a population (2002) of 345 and a population density of 3,450 inhabitants per square kilometre (8,900/sq mi). Since 2002, Vedderheia has been considered a part of the greater Søgne urban area, so the population and area data for this village area has not been separately tracked by Statistics Norway since that time.
