= Lone, Kristiansand =

Village in Kristiansand Municipality, Norway

Lone Lohne (unofficial)
- Village
- Interactive map of Lone
- Coordinates: 58.09651°N 7.74075°E
- Country: Norway
- Region: Southern Norway
- County: Agder
- Municipality: Kristiansand Municipality
- Elevation: 19 m (62 ft)
- Time zone: UTC+01:00 (CET)
  - Summer (DST): UTC+02:00 (CEST)
- Post Code: 4642 Søgne

Lone is a village in Kristiansand Municipality in Agder county, Norway. The village is located along the European route E39 highway, about 4 kilometres (2.5 mi) west of the villages of Tangvall, Lunde, and Høllen.
