= Hans Try =

Norwegian archivist and historian

Hans Try (1934–1990) was a Norwegian archivist and historian.

He hailed from Søgne Municipality. He started as an ethnologist, but later took the cand.philol. degree in history. He worked in the National Archival Services branch in Kristiansand from 1975. His main work was To kulturer - en stat. 1851-1884, volume eleven of the overview of Norwegian history, Norges historie, published by Cappelen and edited by Knut Mykland.

He was a deputy board member of the Norwegian Institute of Local History from 1986 to 1989 and of the State Museum Council from 1987 to 1990.

He died in 1990.
