= Ausviga =

Village in Kristiansand Municipality, Norway

Ausviga Ausvika (unofficial)
- Residential area
- Interactive map of Ausviga
- Coordinates: 58.07761°N 7.77459°E
- Country: Norway
- Region: Southern Norway
- County: Agder
- Municipality: Kristiansand Municipality

Area
  - Total: 0.28 km^{2} (0.11 sq mi)
- Elevation: 16 m (52 ft)

Population (2018)
  - Total: 517
  - Density: 1,846/km^{2} (4,780/sq mi)
- Time zone: UTC+01:00 (CET)
  - Summer (DST): UTC+02:00 (CEST)
- Post Code: 4641 Søgne

Ausviga is a rural, residential village area in Kristiansand Municipality in Agder county, Norway. The area is located along the Torvefjorden, about 3 kilometres (1.9 mi) west of the village of Høllen and about 5 kilometres (3.1 mi) northeast of the village of Trysnes.

The 0.28-square-kilometre (69-acre) village had a population (2018) of 517 and a population density of 1,846 inhabitants per square kilometre (4,780/sq mi). Since 2018, the population and area data for this village area has not been separately tracked by Statistics Norway.
