= Langenes, Agder =

Village in Kristiansand Municipality, Norway

Langenes Langenesbygda
- Village
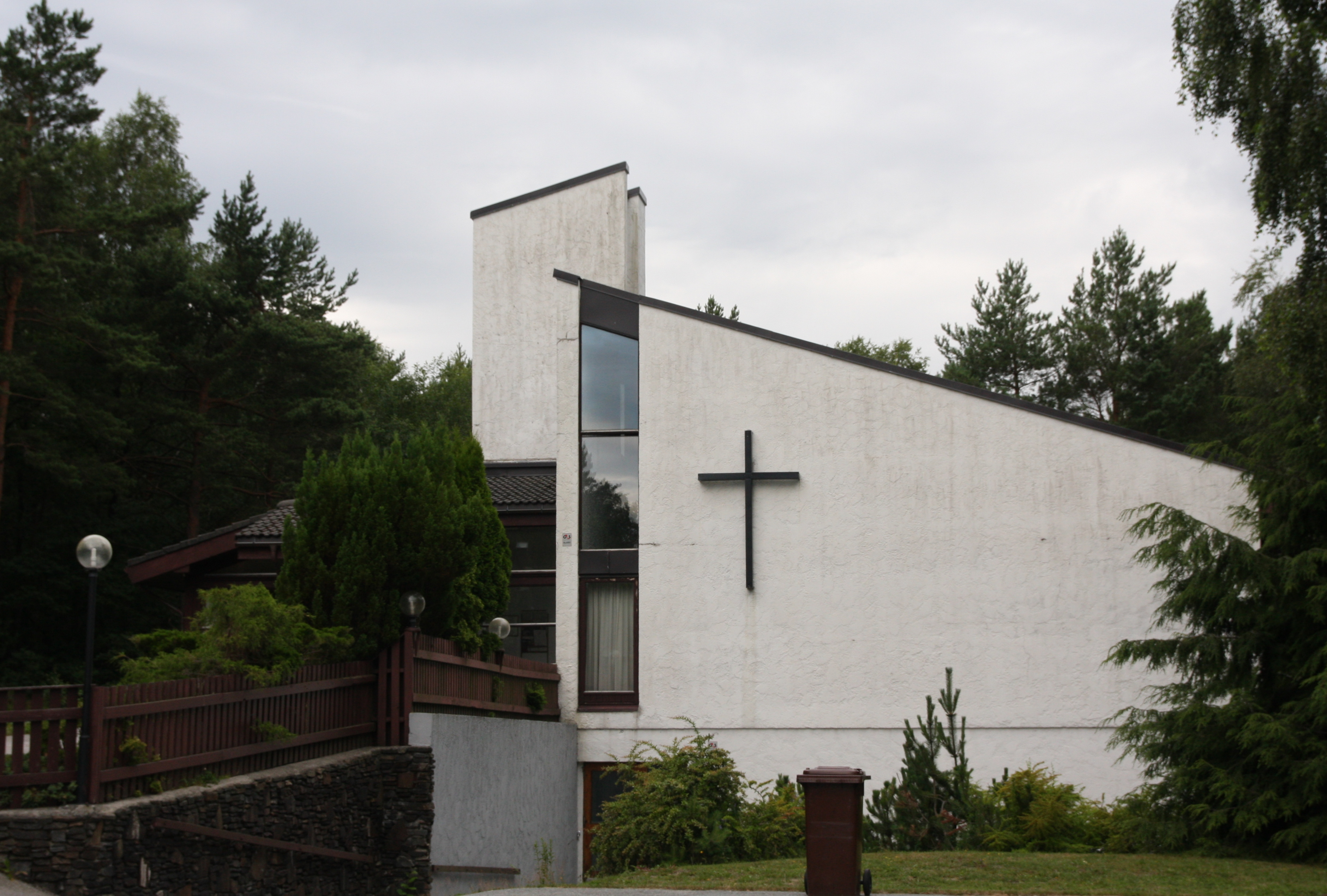
- View of the village church
- Interactive map of Langenes
- Coordinates: 58.07343°N 7.87335°E
- Country: Norway
- Region: Southern Norway
- County: Agder
- Municipality: Kristiansand Municipality
- Elevation: 2 m (6.6 ft)
- Time zone: UTC+01:00 (CET)
  - Summer (DST): UTC+02:00 (CEST)
- Post Code: 4681 Søgne

Langenes is a village in Kristiansand Municipality in Agder county, Norway. The village is located along the Norwegian County Road 456, just east of the village of Åros. The village sits on the coastline in the southeastern part of the greater Søgne area. The Langenes Church is located in the village.

As a part of the greater Søgne urban area, separate population statistics are not tracked for Langenes. Altogether, the 6.59-square-kilometre (1,630-acre) urban area has a population (2025) of 11,442 and a population density of 1,736 inhabitants per square kilometre (4,500/sq mi).

== History ==
In 2020, the village area became part of Kristiansand Municipality, and prior to that time it was located in Søgne Municipality.
