= Amfi Vågsbygd =

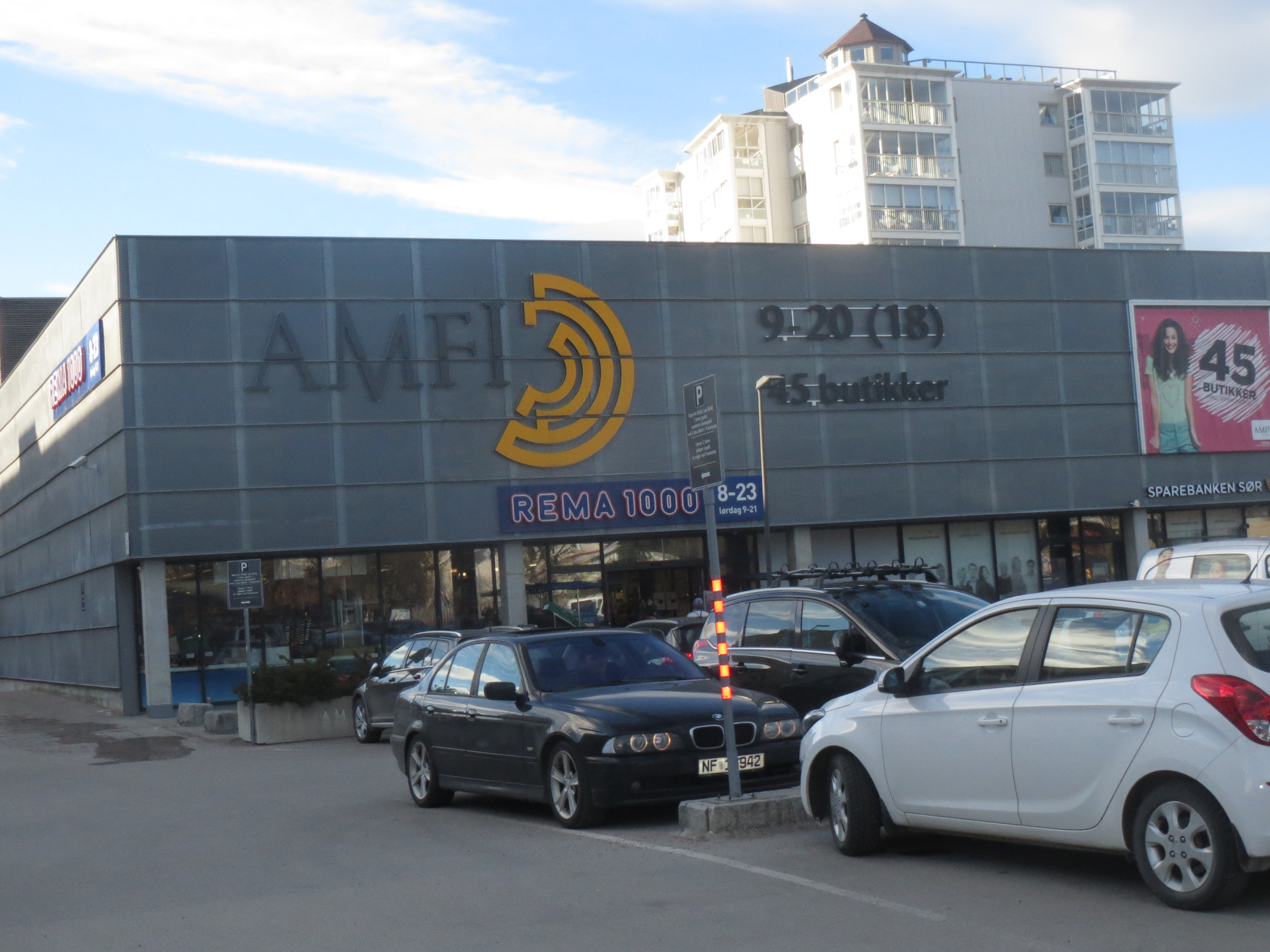
- Interactive map of the Amfi Vågsbygd area
- Alternative names: Vågsbygd Mall

General information
- Type: Shopping mall
- Location: Kirsten Flagstads vei 32; Kristiansand, Norway; 4621
- Coordinates: 58°7′32.8″N 7°57′12.3″E
- Cost: 501 mill
- Owner: Amfi Eiendom AS

Technical details
- Floor count: 1 on East Wing; 2 on Middle Hallway; 1 on West Wing
- Floor area: 12 000 m²

Other information
- Number of stores: 46
- Parking: 400

Website
- www.amfi.no/kjopesentre/amfi-vagsbygd/

Amfi Vågsbygd is a shopping mall in the centrum of the borough of Vågsbygd in the city of Kristiansand in Agder county, Norway. The mall has around 46 stores and occupies the same building as Vågsbygd Culture House and Vågsbygd High School.
