= Søgne Church =

Church in Agder, Norway

- Søgne hovedkirke
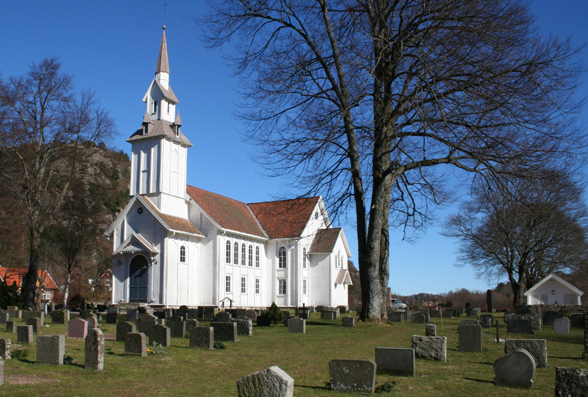
- View of the church
- Søgne Church
- 58.0950°N 07.7873°E
- Location: Kristiansand Municipality, Agder
- Country: Norway
- Denomination: Church of Norway
- Churchmanship: Evangelical Lutheran

History
- Status: Parish church
- Founded: 1861
- Consecrated: 29 Nov 1861

Architecture
- Functional status: Active
- Architect: Christian H. Grosch
- Architectural type: Cruciform
- Completed: 1861 (165 years ago)

Specifications
- Capacity: 750
- Materials: Wood

Administration
- Diocese: Agder og Telemark
- Deanery: Kristiansand domprosti
- Parish: Søgne
- Norwegian Cultural Heritage Site
- Type: Church
- Status: Not protected
- ID: 214160

Søgne Church (Norwegian: Søgne hovedkirke) is a parish church of the Church of Norway in Kristiansand Municipality in Agder county, Norway. It is located in the village of Lunde, just west of Tangvall. It is the church for the Søgne parish which is part of the Kristiansand domprosti (arch-deanery) in the Diocese of Agder og Telemark. The white, wooden church was built in a cruciform design in 1861 using plans drawn up by the architect Christian H. Grosch. The church seats about 750 people. Inside, the church has balcony seating along all the walls leading up to the chancel. The chancel floor is raised three steps above the floor of the nave.

== History ==
The church was consecrated on 29 November 1861. The church was built to replace the older and smaller Old Søgne Church which is located about 3 kilometres (1.9 mi) to the southeast of the site of the new church.

== See also ==
- List of churches in Agder og Telemark
