= Songdalselva =

River in Agder, Norway

Songdalselva Søgneelva Songa / Sogna
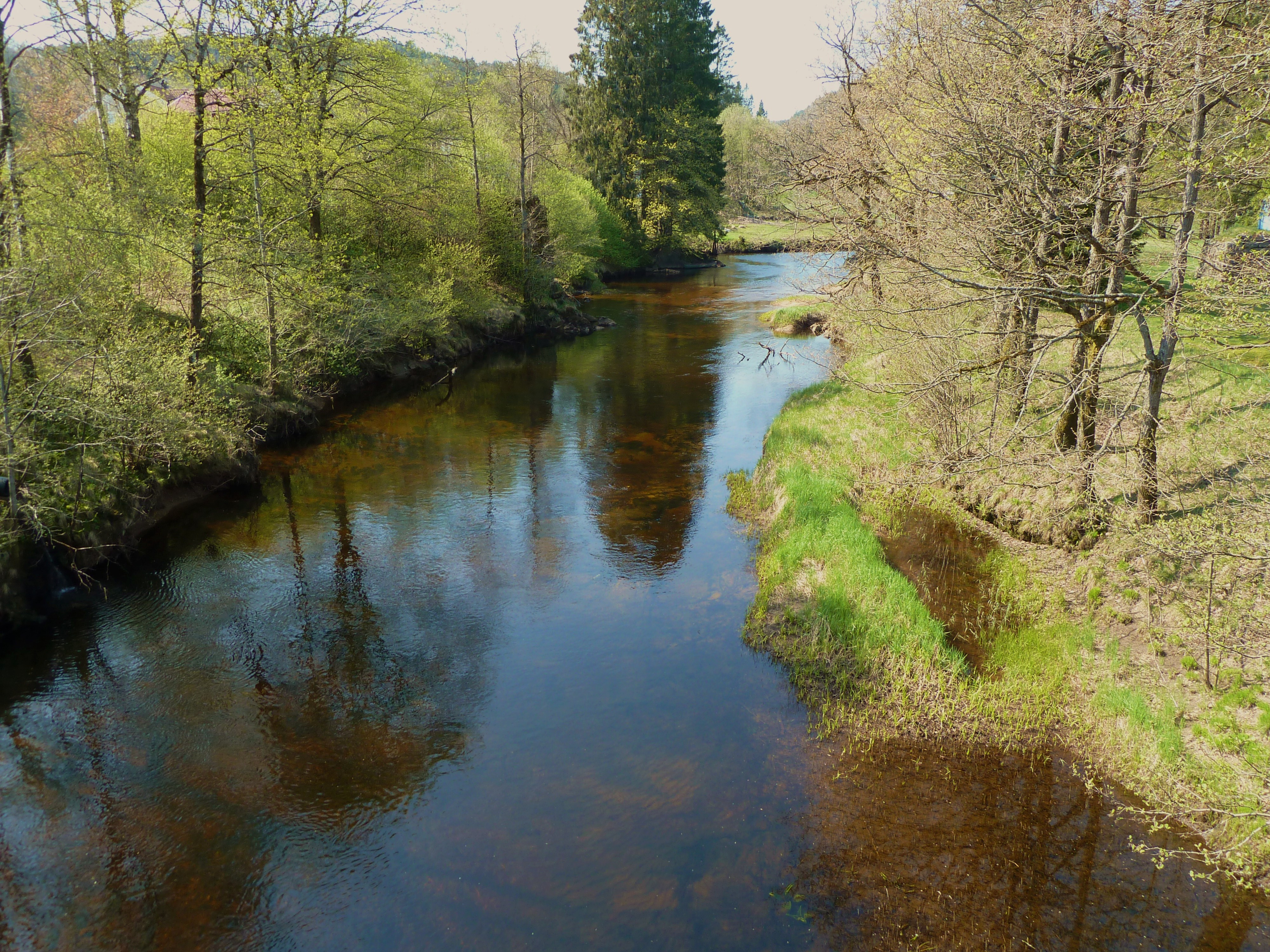
- View of the river

Location
- Country: Norway
- County: Agder
- Municipalities: Kristiansand Municipality, Vennesla Municipality

Physical characteristics
- Source
  - location: Sognevannet, Kristiansand/Vennesla
  - coordinates: 58.3158°N 07.6725°E
  - elevation: 311 metres (1,020 ft)
- Mouth
  - location: Høllen, Kristiansand Municipality
  - coordinates: 58.0762°N 07.8155°E
  - elevation: 0 metres (0 ft)
- Length: 55.3 km (34.4 mi)
- Basin size: 209.4 km^{2} (80.8 sq mi)
- Discharge
  - average: 6.25 m^{3}/s (221 cu ft/s)

Basin features
- River system: Songdalen
- Tributaries
  - right: Gumpedalselva

Songdalselva or Søgneelva or Songa is a river in Agder county, Norway. The 55.3-kilometre (34.4 mi) long river in the hills between Finsland in Kristiansand Municipality and Hægeland in Vennesla Municipality. The 209.4-square-kilometre (80.8 sq mi) catchment area is located between the Otra river and Mandalselva river watersheds. The river runs through the villages of Hortemo, Nodeland, Volleberg, Tangvall, Åros, and Høllen.

The highest hills in the catchment area go up to 450 metres (1,480 ft) above sea level. The water flows are normally at their lowest in the summer and they're at their highest levels during the autumn and spring. There are only a few small lakes in the river system. The steep slopes down from the moors can create short and intense flood rapids. The river (here called Songa) flows through the Stallemodalen valley in Vennesla Municipality, and then falls into the Songdalen valley through a gorge at Underåsen.

Once in the Songdalen valley, it is called the Songdalselva. Here it receives more water from the right from the Gumpedalselva river (tributary). The river drops no more than about 20-meter (66 ft) over the last 20-kilometer (12 mi) to the river mouth, and has on this stretch a very meandering run. There is a short waterfall (Søgne waterfall) near the Søgne Landbruksskole. From that waterfall to the sea, the river is called the Søgneelva. The Songdalselva flows into the sea between the villages of Høllen and Åros in Kristiansand Municipality.

Both salmon and sea trout are found in the river, and a fishing license is required for fishing along the river.

== Environment ==
In the post-war years up until the 1980s, the river was thought of as an open sewer. Bathing and fishing were not recommended. Water quality improved by the time the sewer was led through pipes and cleansed before discharged to the sea. Today's (2016) environmental issue is mainly illegal garbage disposal and plastic waste from farming, accumulation along the banks and flowing into the ocean when the river is flooding.

In 1993, the watercourse was protected against hydropower development pursuant to Norwegian law, by development plans through Conservation Plan IV for waterways.

== Media gallery ==
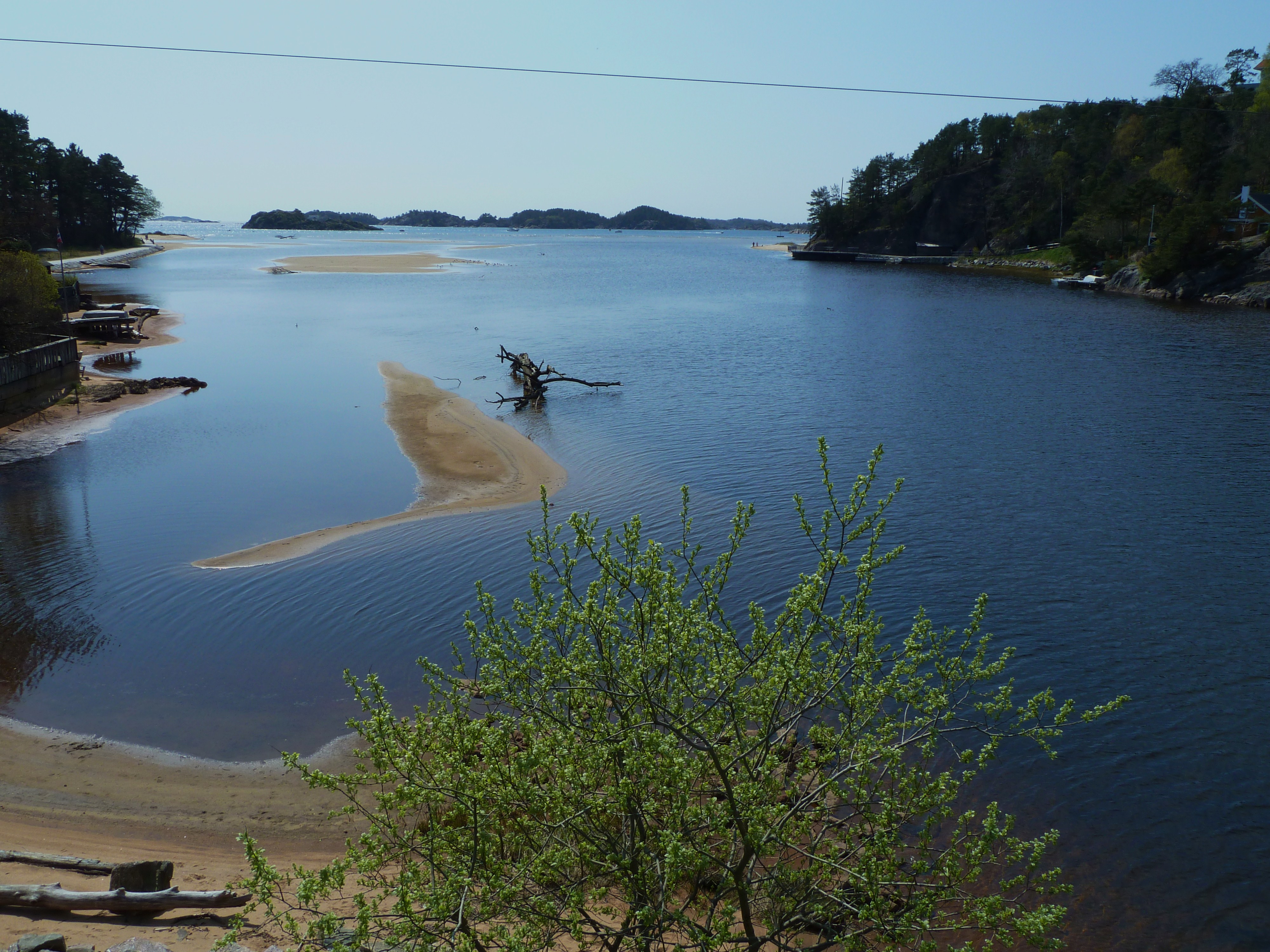
Søgneelva's mouth in Høllefjorden between Åros and Høllen.

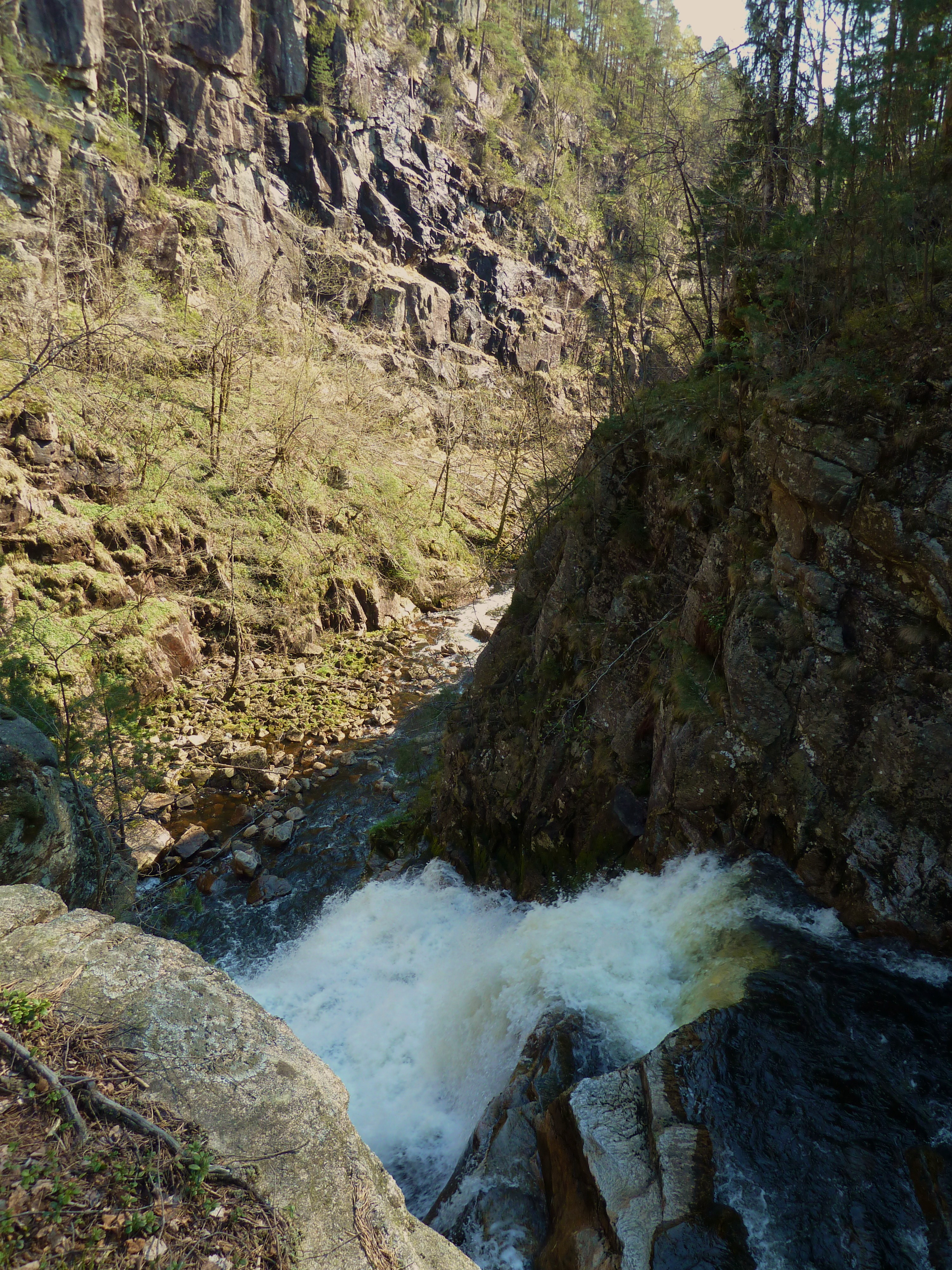
Songdalselva at the start of the gorge at Underåsen.

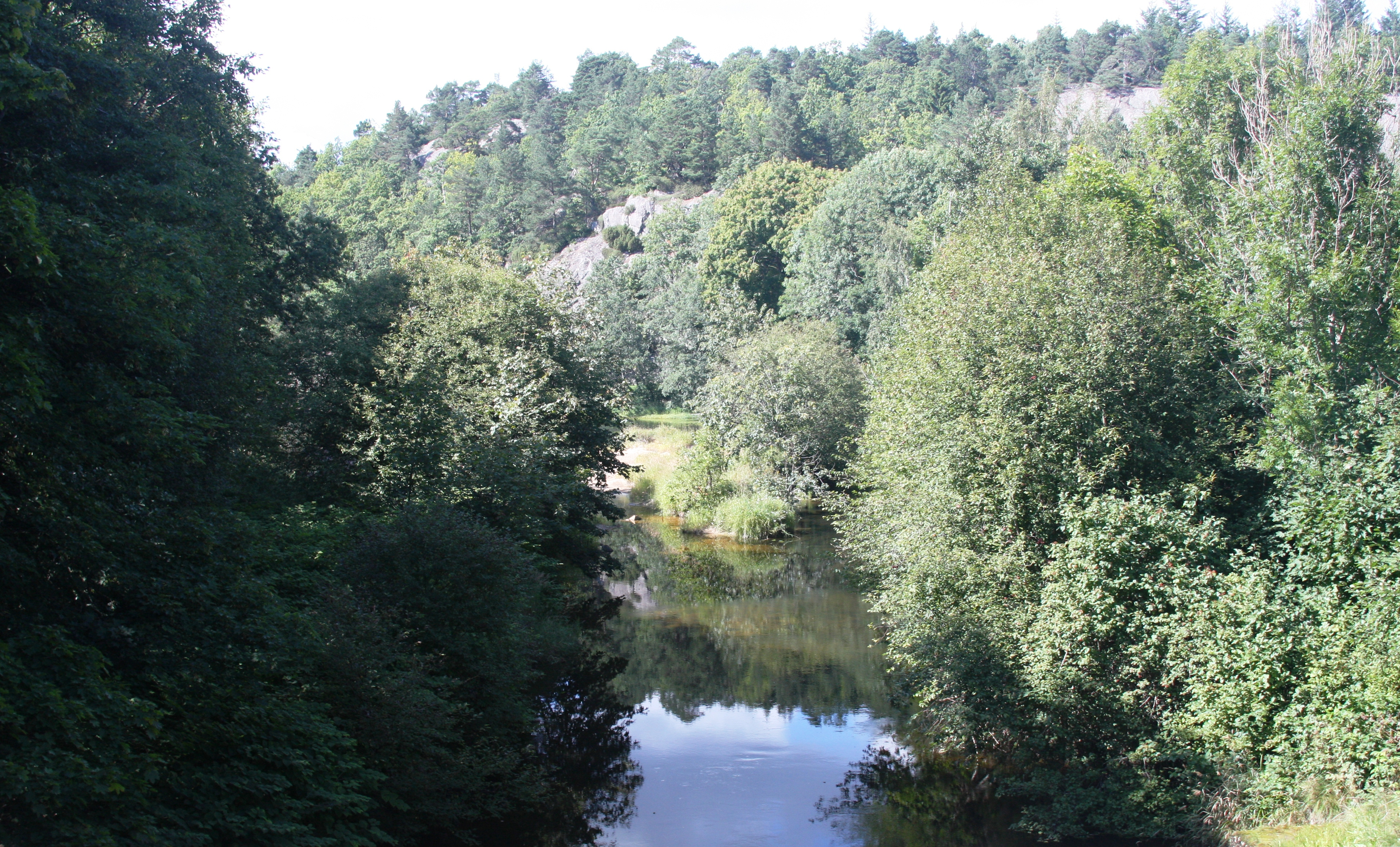
Viewof the river in Søgne
