= Eik, Agder =

Village in Kristiansand Municipality, Norway

Eik Eig
- Village
- Interactive map of Eik
- Coordinates: 58.09068°N 7.78721°E
- Country: Norway
- Region: Southern Norway
- County: Agder
- Municipality: Kristiansand Municipality
- Elevation: 7 m (23 ft)
- Time zone: UTC+01:00 (CET)
  - Summer (DST): UTC+02:00 (CEST)
- Post Code: 4640 Søgne

Eik is a village in Kristiansand Municipality in Agder county, Norway. The village is located on the south side of the European route E39 highway between the villages of Lunde to the west, Tangvall to the east, and Høllen to the south. The main residential neighborhood in the village is called Eikeheia. Vaglen Beach is located just to the south of the village. The village is considered to the part of the greater Søgne urban area, so its individual population statistics are not tracked by Statistics Norway.
