= Old Søgne Church =

Church in Agder, Norway

- Søgne gamle kirke
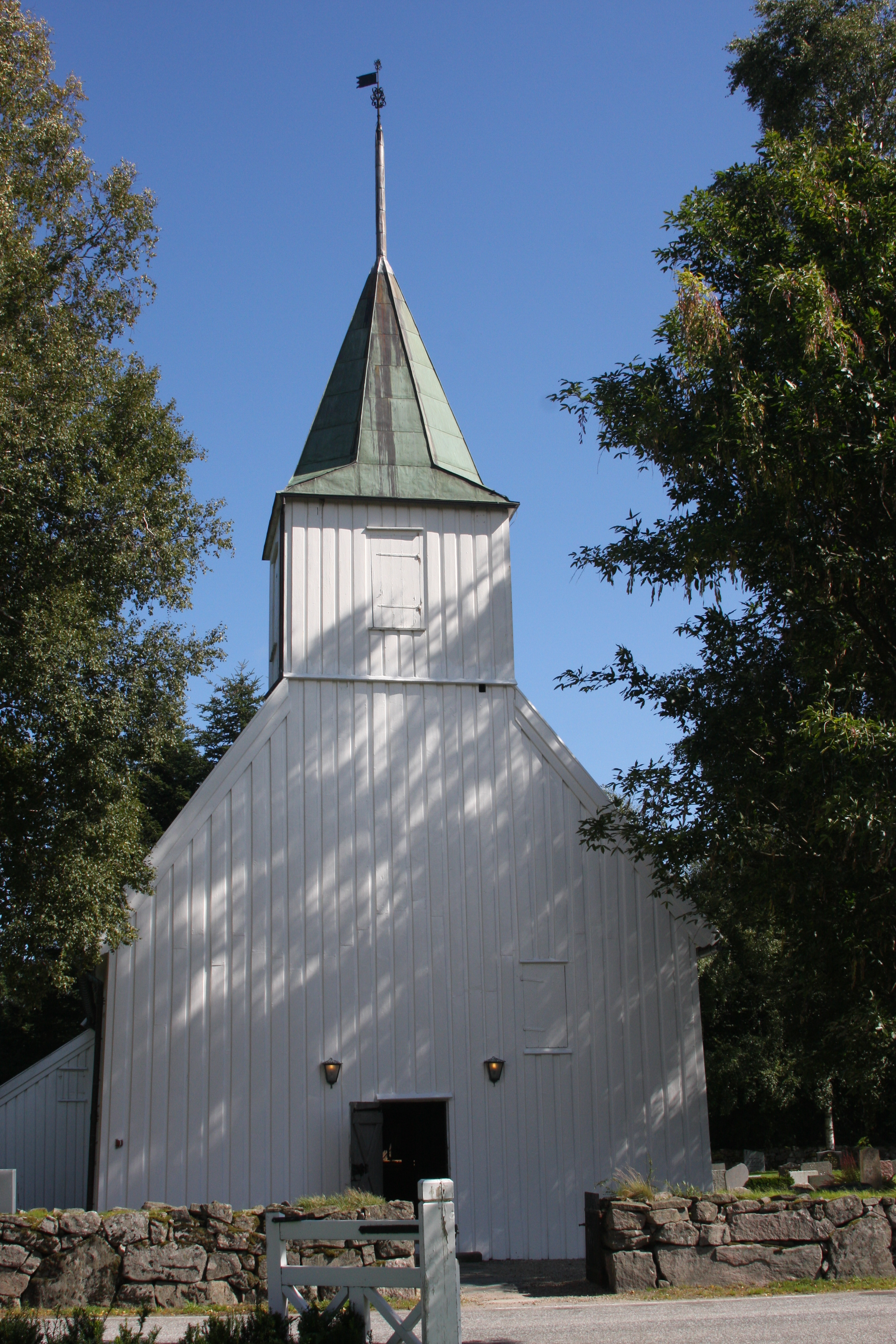
- View of the church
- Old Søgne Church
- 58.0904°N 07.8419°E
- Location: Kristiansand Municipality, Agder
- Country: Norway
- Denomination: Church of Norway
- Previous denomination: Catholic Church
- Churchmanship: Evangelical Lutheran

History
- Status: Parish church
- Founded: 13th century
- Consecrated: c. 1640

Architecture
- Functional status: Historic
- Architectural type: Long church
- Completed: 1640 (386 years ago)
- Closed: 1861

Specifications
- Capacity: 270
- Materials: Wood

Administration
- Diocese: Agder og Telemark
- Deanery: Kristiansand domprosti
- Parish: Søgne
- Norwegian Cultural Heritage Site
- Type: Church
- Status: Automatically protected
- ID: 85037

Old Søgne Church (Norwegian: Søgne gamle kirke) is a historic parish church of the Church of Norway in Kristiansand Municipality in Agder county, Norway. It is located in the southeastern part of the village of Tangvall. It was once the main church for the Søgne parish which is now part of the Kristiansand domprosti (arch-deanery) in the Diocese of Agder og Telemark. The white, timber-framed church was built in a long church design in 1640 using plans drawn up by an unknown architect. The church seats about 270 people.

The "new" Søgne Church was built about 3 kilometres (1.9 mi) to the northwest of this location in 1861 to replace this (smaller) church. Since that time, this church is no longer regularly used, but it is available for special occasions such as baptisms and weddings.

== History ==
The earliest existing historical records of the church date back to the year 1344, but the church was not new at that time (it was likely founded in the 13th century). In 1604, the parish of Søgne was established when it was separated from the main Oddernes Church parish. The old medieval stave church in Søgne was torn down in the 1630s and a new church was completed on the same site around 1640. It was a long church with a rectangular, timber-framed nave and on the east end was a narrower chancel with a lower roof line that was constructed out of lumber. Some parts of the old stave church were re-used in the new church, including the pulpit. In 1743, a new sacristy was built on the north side of the building. In 1760, a new tower on the west end was constructed.

In 1814, this church served as an election church (Norwegian: valgkirke). Together with more than 300 other parish churches across Norway, it was a polling station for elections to the 1814 Norwegian Constituent Assembly which wrote the Constitution of Norway. This was Norway's first national elections. Each church parish was a constituency that elected people called "electors" who later met together in each county to elect the representatives for the assembly that was to meet at Eidsvoll Manor later that year.

The walls and ceilings of the interior are covered with painted rosemåling decorations of vines and figures from the 17th and 18th centuries and later. The decorations were repainted in the 19th century, first with blue-gray in 1833, and then with white around 1860. In connection with the restoration of the church from 1953 to 1957, the remains of the original decor were restored by curator Finn Krafft.

== Media gallery ==
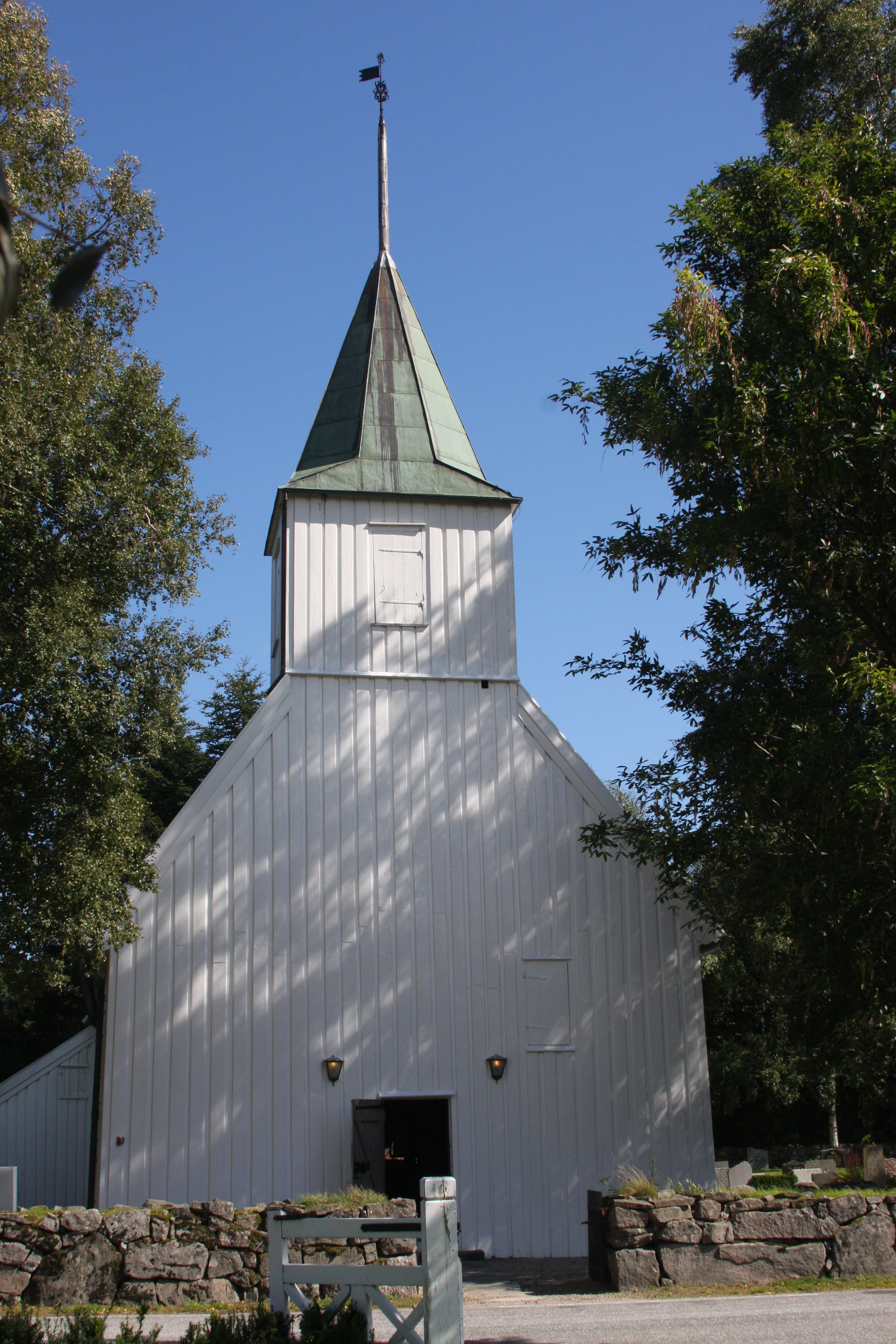
Front view of the church

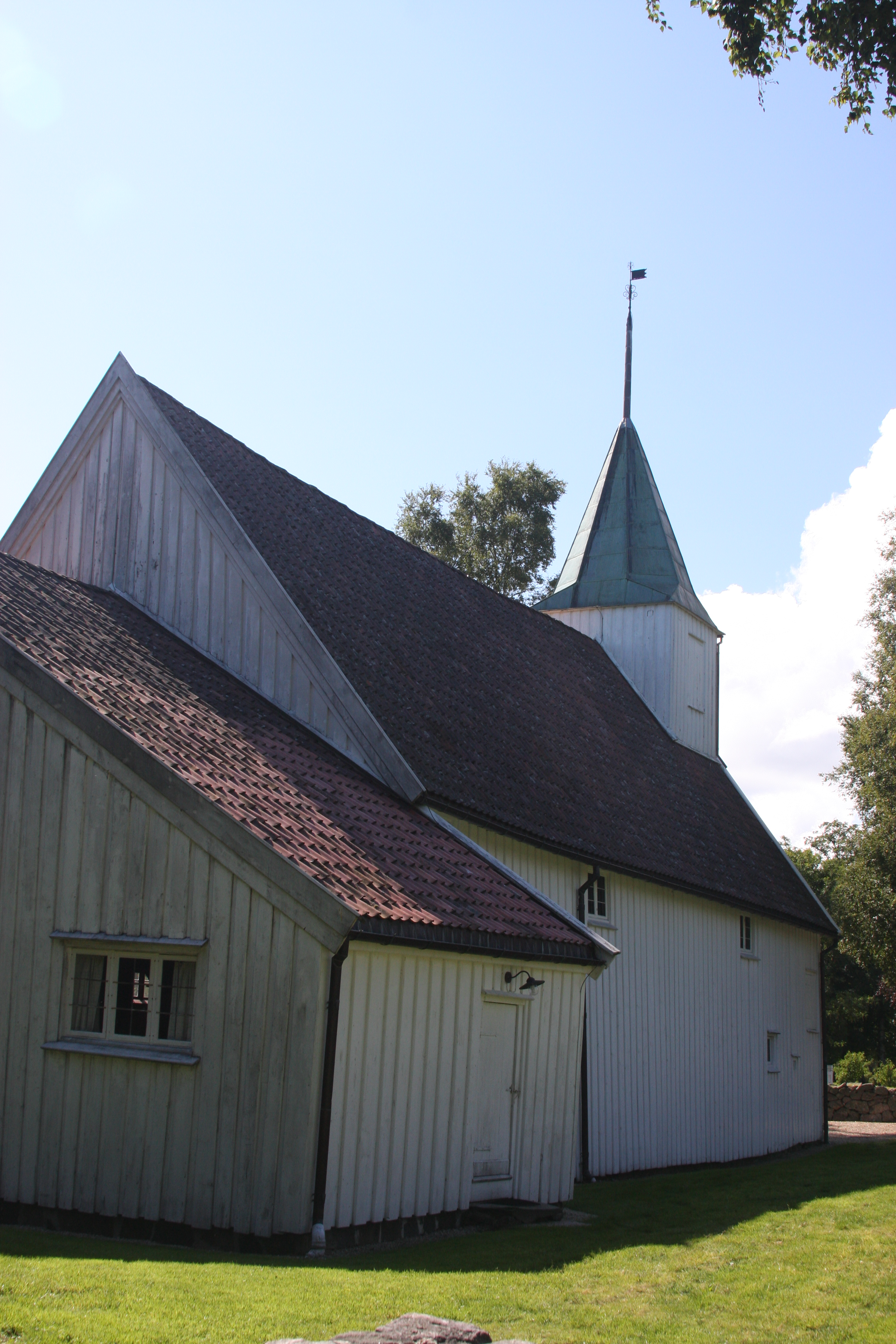
Rear view of the church

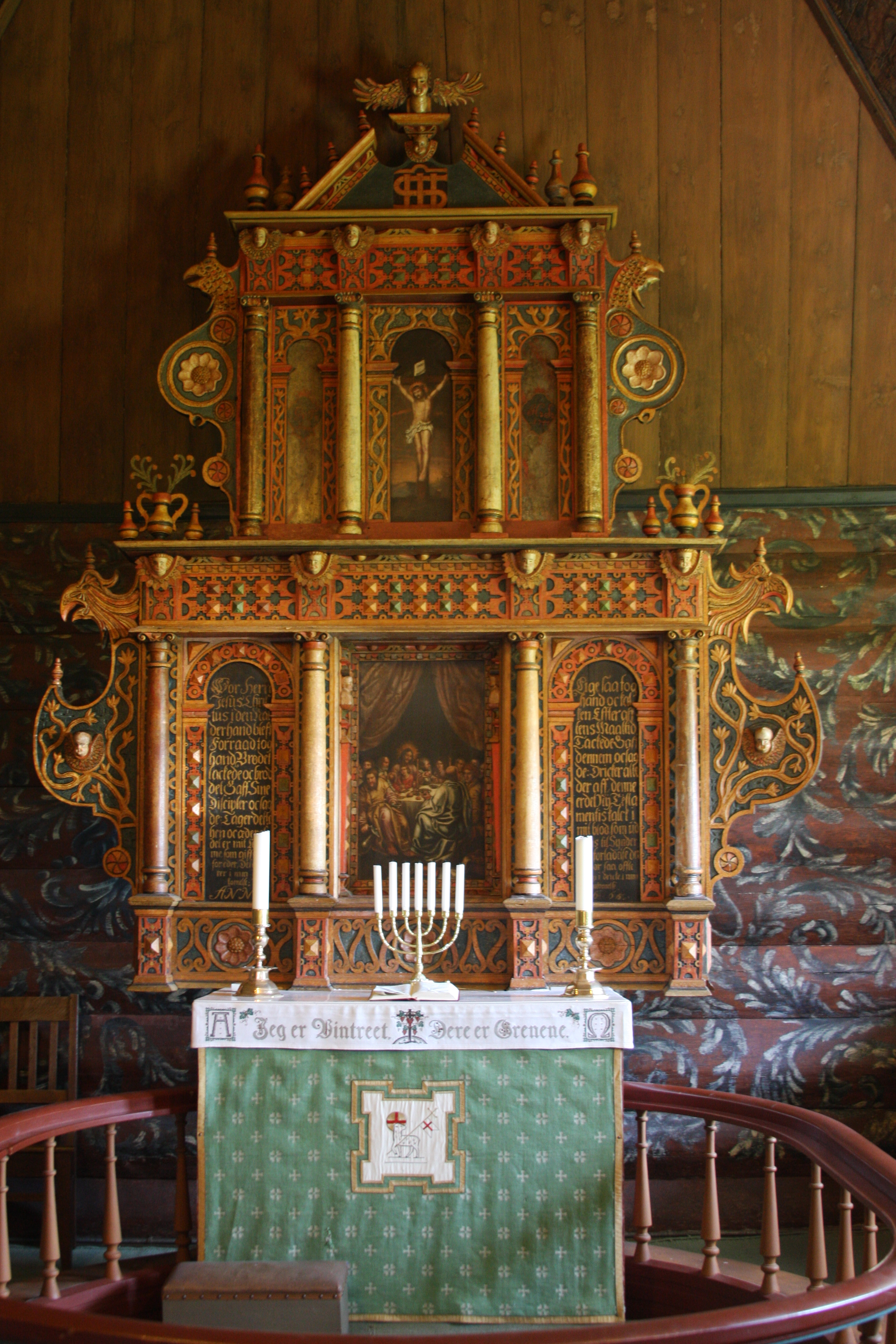
Altar in the church

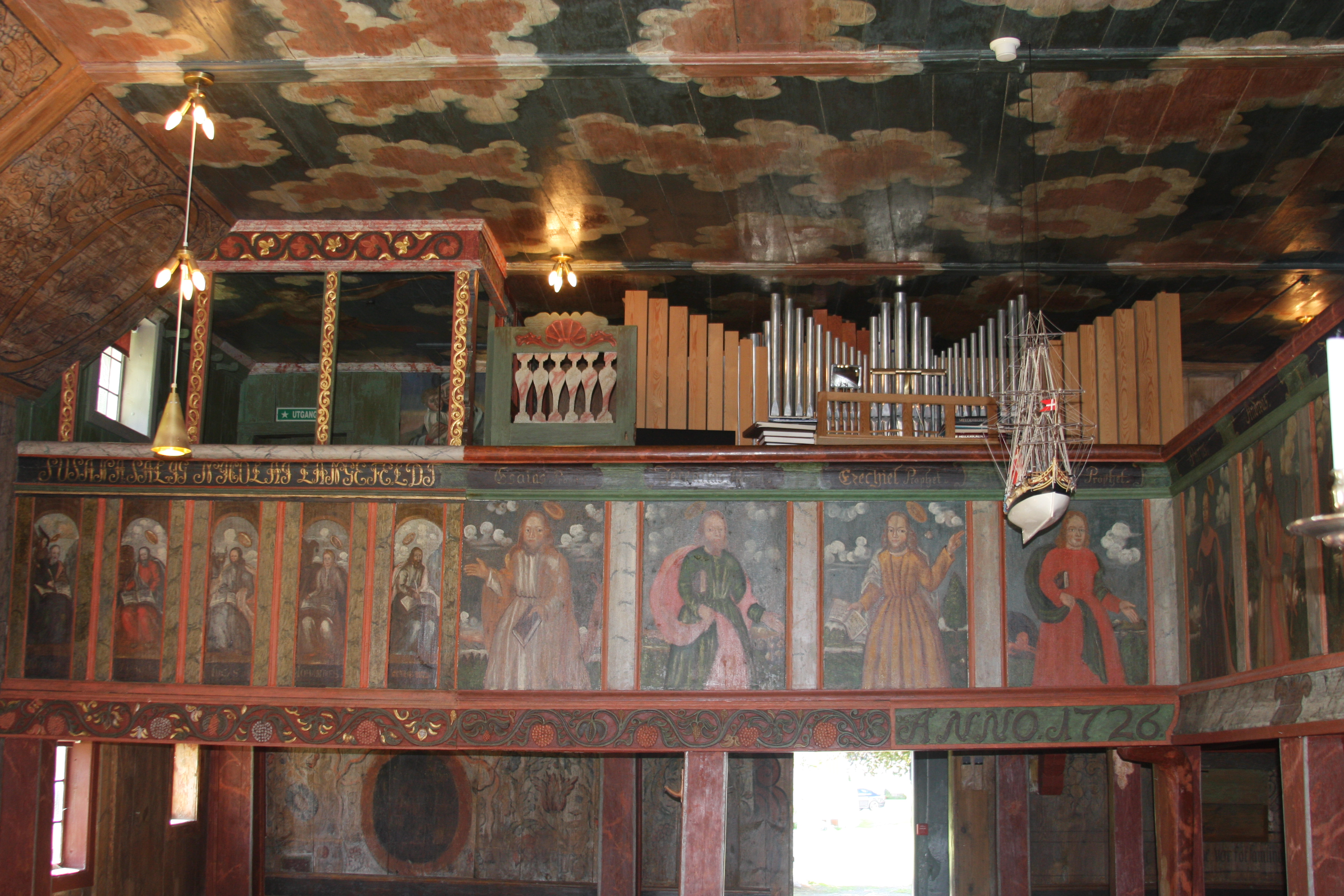
Interior, back of the church

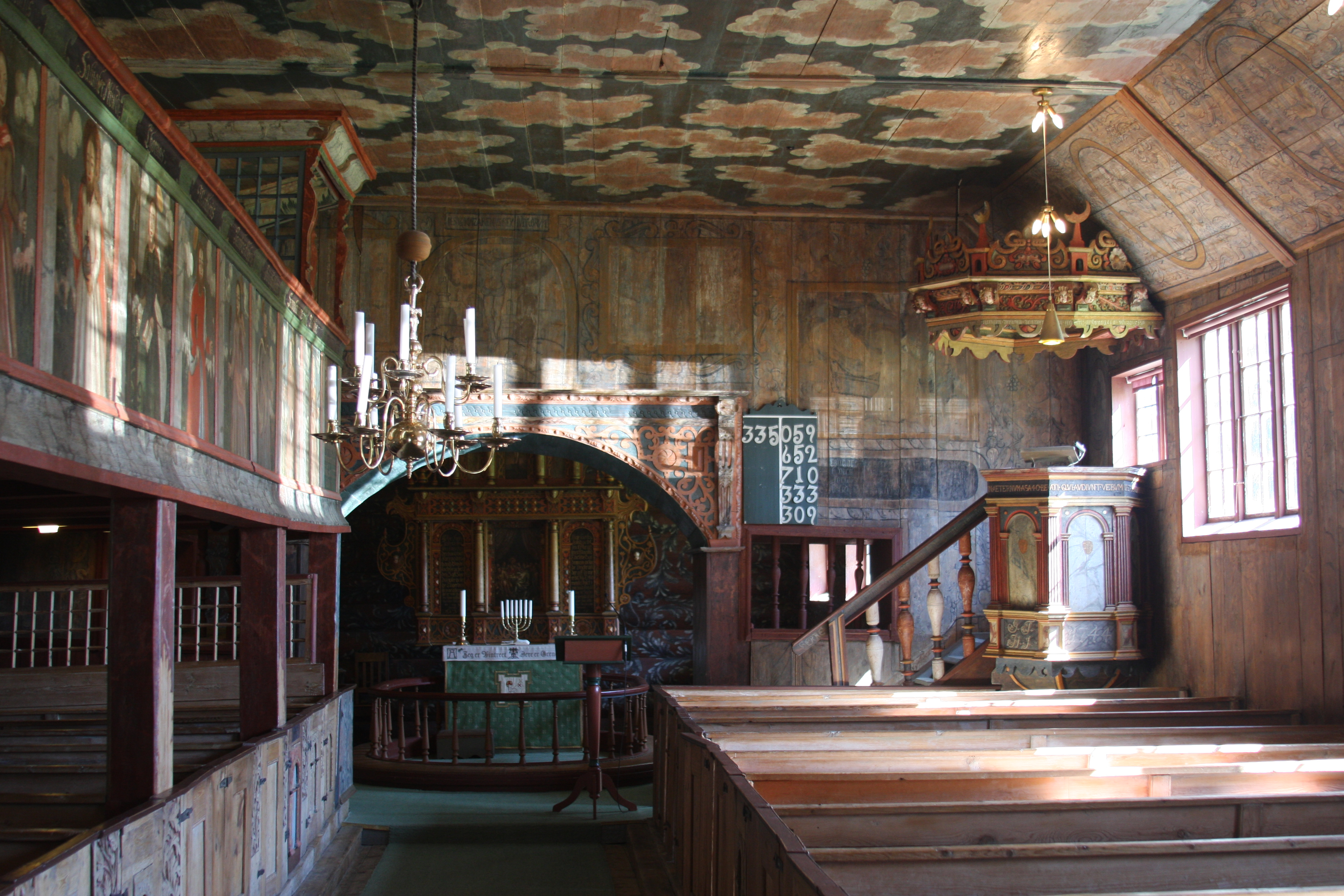
Interior, looking to the front

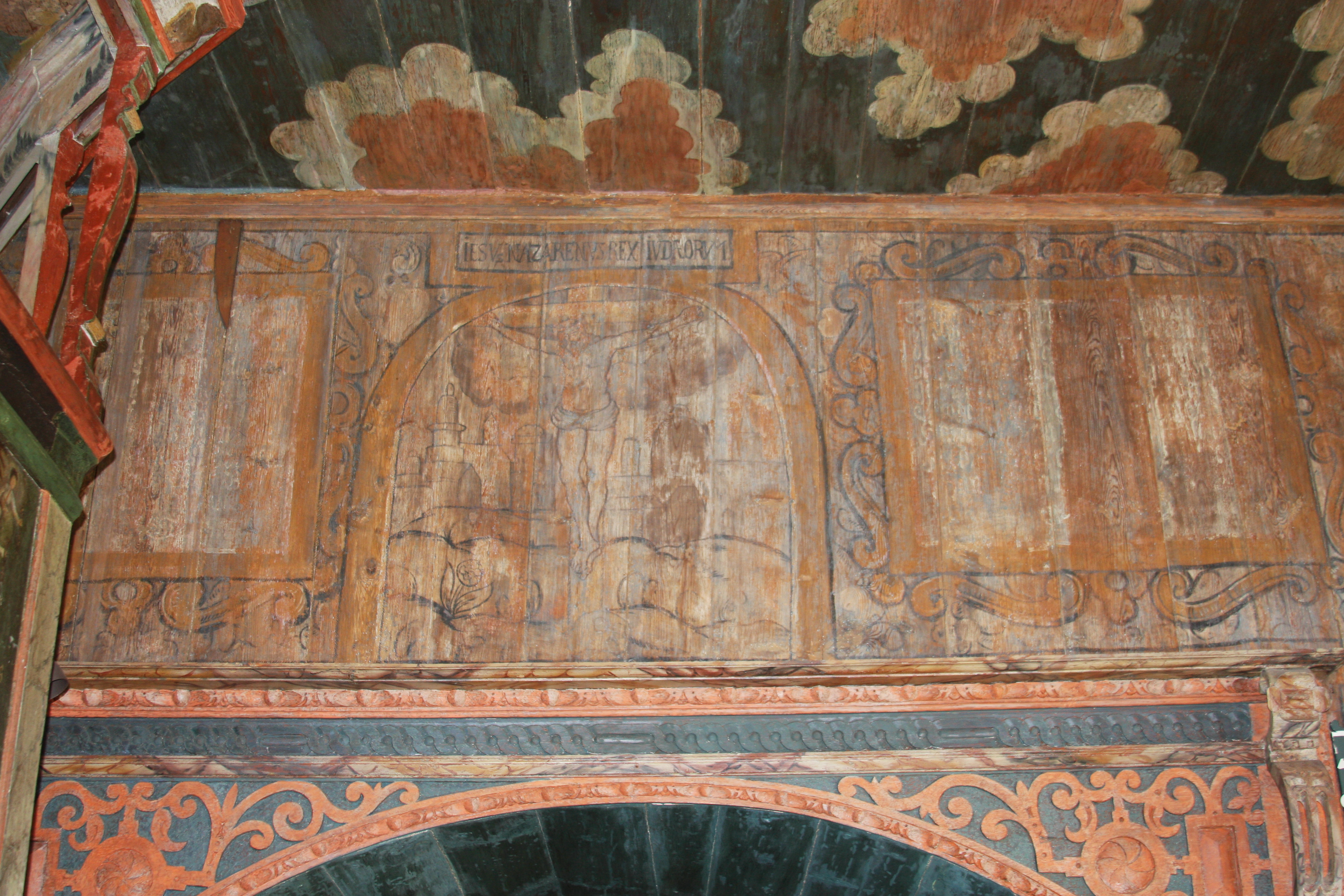
Interior artwork

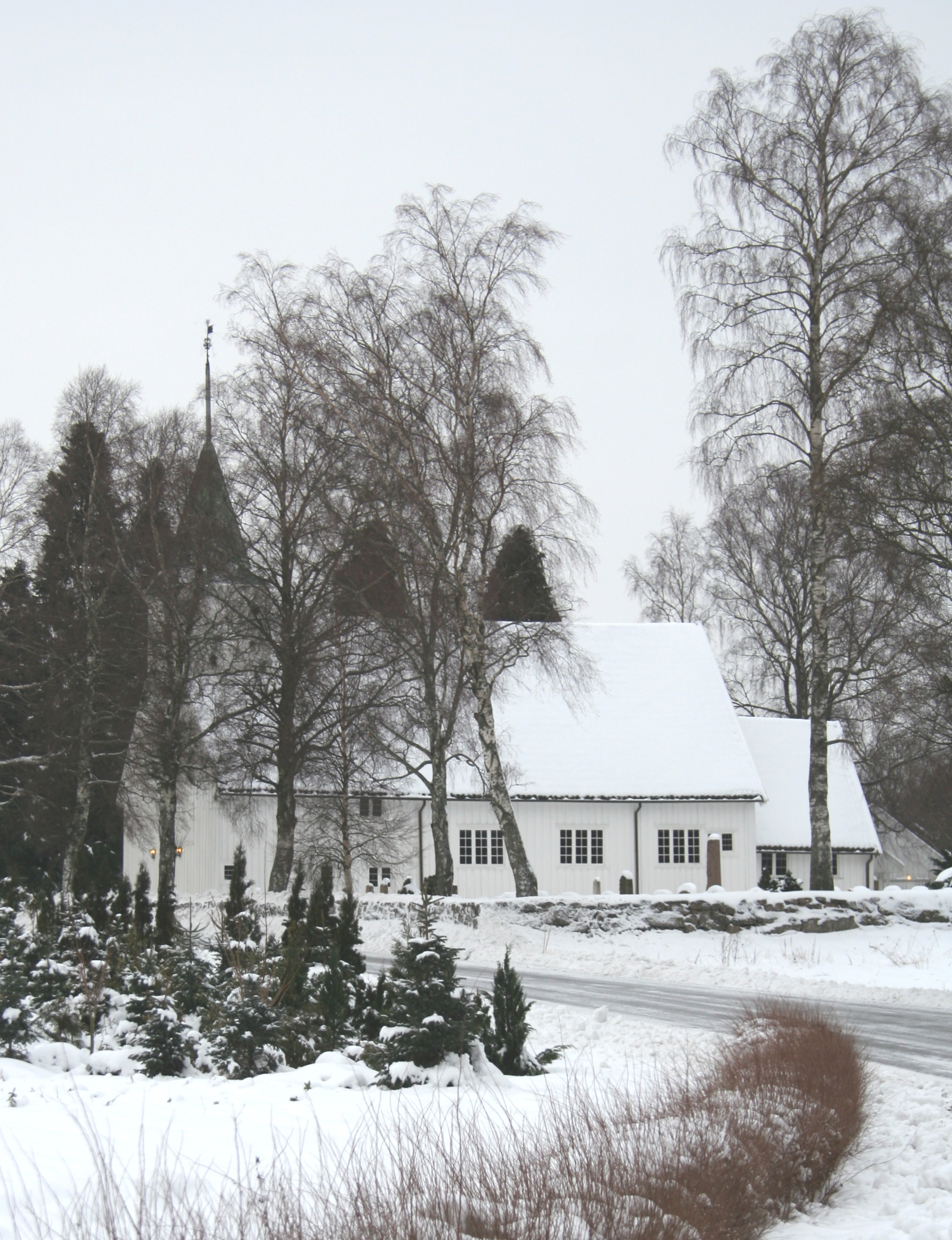
Historic view of the exterior

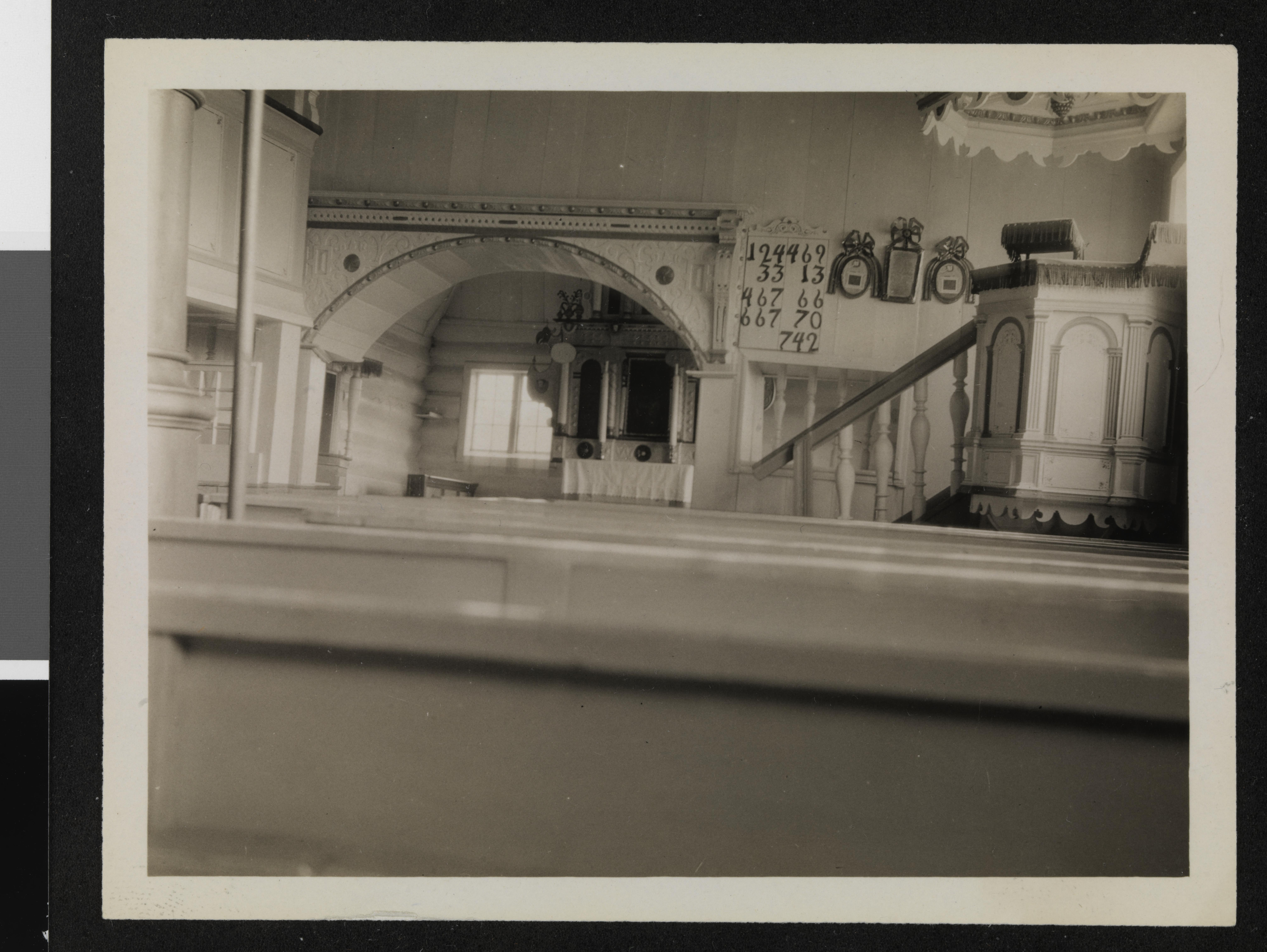
Historic view of the interior

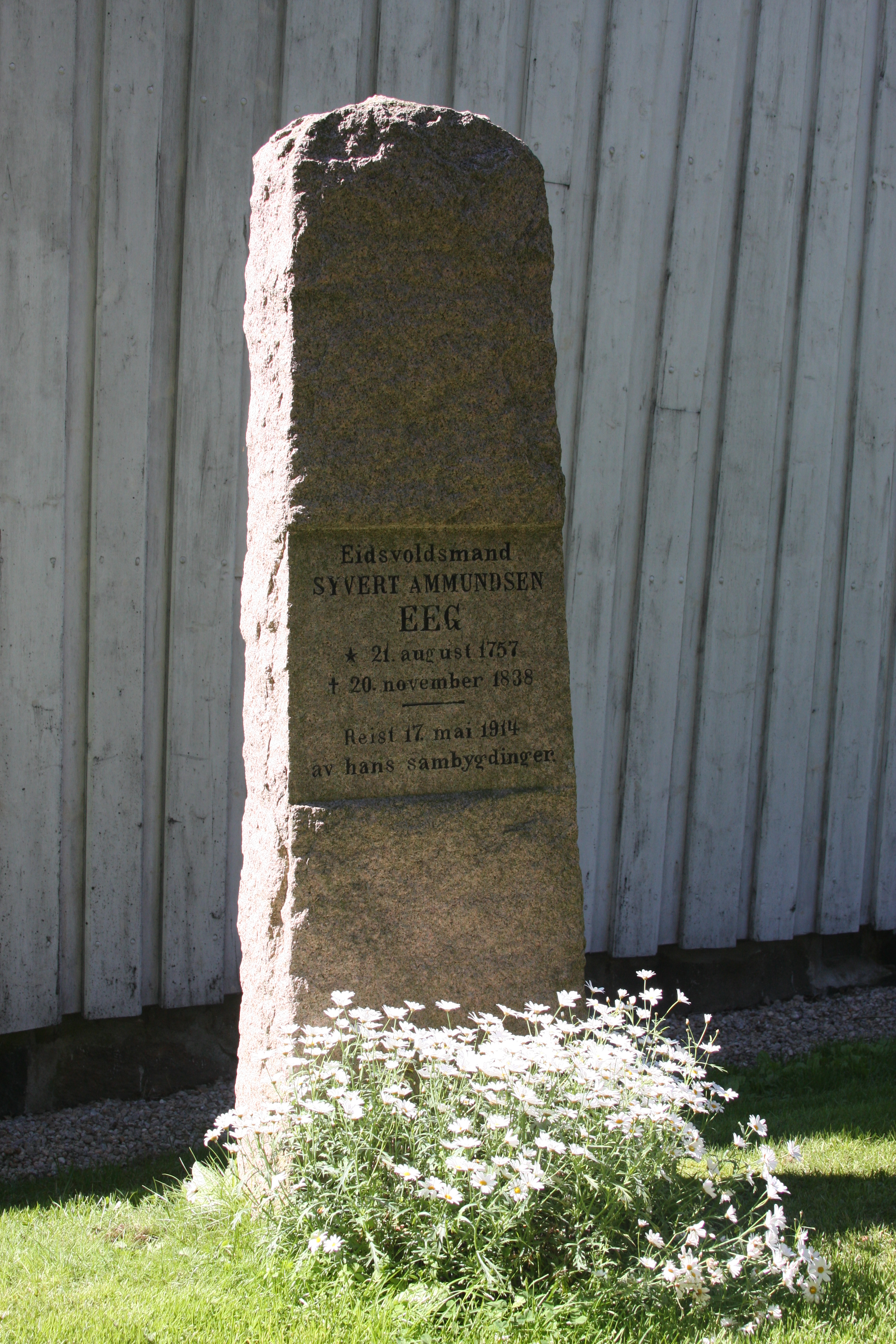
Stone marker commemorating the Søgne representative at the Eidsvold Constitutional Convention in 1814

== See also ==
- List of churches in Agder og Telemark
