= Åros, Søgne =

Village in Kristiansand Municipality, Norway

Åros
- Village
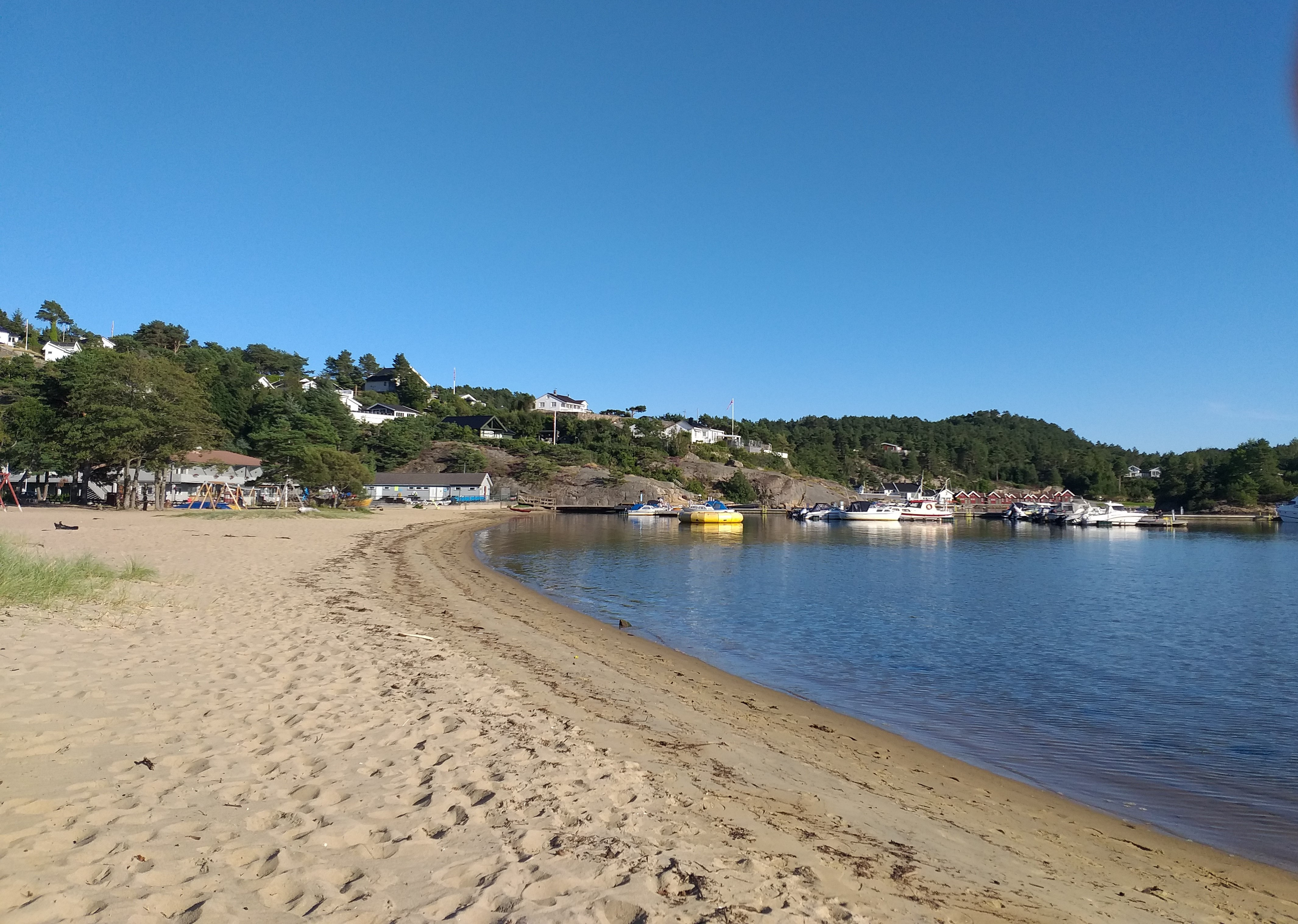
- View of the beach at Åros
- Interactive map of Åros
- Coordinates: 58.07901°N 7.82554°E
- Country: Norway
- Region: Southern Norway
- County: Agder
- Municipality: Kristiansand Municipality
- Elevation: 5 m (16 ft)
- Time zone: UTC+01:00 (CET)
  - Summer (DST): UTC+02:00 (CEST)
- Post Code: 4644 Søgne

Åros is a village in Kristiansand Municipality in Agder county, Norway. The village is located along the river Søgneelva between the village of Høllen to the west and Langenes to the east. The west side of Åros reaches the Høllefjorden. Åros Feriesenter is a large recreational area along the fjord. It includes a camping facility and a beach area that is a popular attraction in the summer for residents and tourists alike. Årosskogen is the main residential neighborhood in the village.

Åros is considered part of the urban area of Søgne, therefore separate population statistics are not tracked for Åros. Altogether, the 6.59-square-kilometre (1,630-acre) urban area has a population (2025) of 11,442 and a population density of 1,736 inhabitants per square kilometre (4,500/sq mi).
