= Tangvall =

Village in Kristiansand Municipality, Norway

Tangvall Søgne
- Village
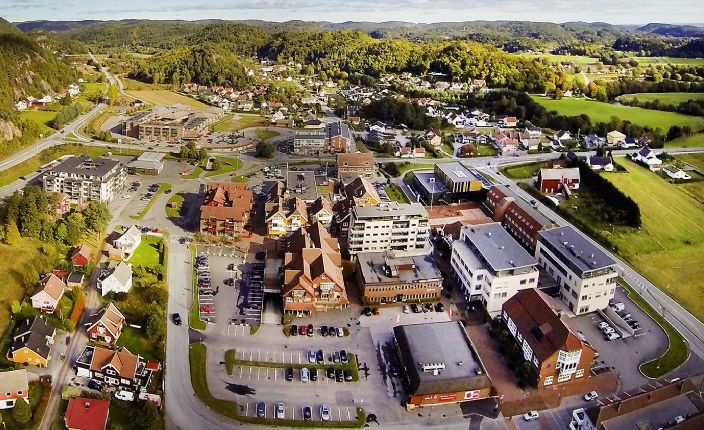
- View of the village
- Interactive map of Tangvall
- Coordinates: 58.09781°N 7.81529°E
- Country: Norway
- Region: Southern Norway
- County: Agder
- Municipality: Kristiansand Municipality

Area
  - Total: 6.59 km^{2} (2.54 sq mi)
- Elevation: 16 m (52 ft)

Population (2025)
  - Total: 11,442
  - Density: 1,736/km^{2} (4,500/sq mi)
- Time zone: UTC+01:00 (CET)
  - Summer (DST): UTC+02:00 (CEST)
- Post Code: 4640 Søgne

Tangvall or Søgne is an urban village in Kristiansand Municipality in Agder county, Norway. The village is located along the European route E39 highway and the river Søgneelva. The village sits just north of the neighboring villages of Åros and Høllen, northeast of the village of Eik, and east of the village of Lunde. The municipal high school is also located here.

Together, the villages of Tangvall, Lunde, Høllen, Eik, Åros, and Langenes all form one large urban area known as Søgne, with Tangvall being the largest of the group. The 6.59-square-kilometre (1,630-acre) urban area of Søgne has a population (2025) of 11,442 and a population density of 1,736 inhabitants per square kilometre (4,500/sq mi).

== History ==
The Old Søgne Church is located in the southeastern part of the urban area, just north of Åros and Langenes. The "new" Søgne Church is located in Lunde.

The village of Tangvall was part of the old Søgne Municipality which existed until 2020 when it was merged into Kristiansand Municipality. From 1838 until 1974, the administrative centre of Søgne Municipality was the village of Lunde. In 1974, the administrative centre was moved to Tangvall, where it remained until 2020 when the municipality was dissolved.
