= Høllen =

Village in Kristiansand Municipality, Norway

- Village
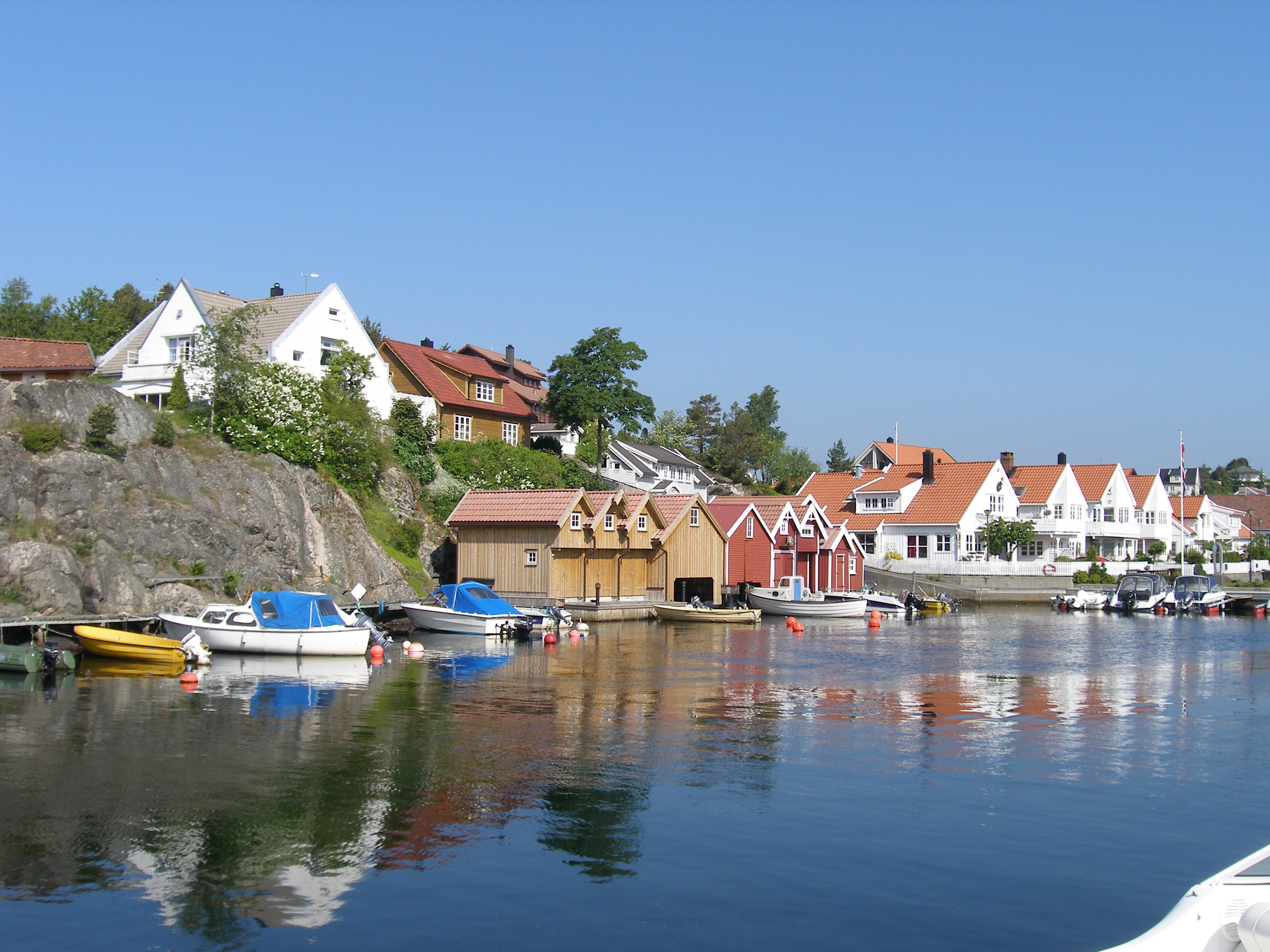
- View of the village harbour
- Interactive map of Høllen
- Coordinates: 58.07872°N 7.80858°E
- Country: Norway
- Region: Southern Norway
- County: Agder
- Municipality: Kristiansand Municipality
- Elevation: 1 m (3.3 ft)
- Time zone: UTC+01:00 (CET)
  - Summer (DST): UTC+02:00 (CEST)
- Post Code: 4640 Søgne

Høllen is a fishing village in Kristiansand Municipality in Agder county, Norway. The village is located at the mouth of the river Søgneelva, between the villages of Eik to the west, Tangvall to the north, and Åros to the east. Høllen is part of the greater Søgne urban area. It has a well-protected harbour and over the centuries has had shipyards, a post office, and it was the site of a Thing in the 1500s. There is regular ferry boat service to Ny-Hellesund from Høllen.

As a part of the greater Søgne urban area in Kristiansand Municipality, separate population statistics are not tracked for Høllen. Altogether, the 6.59-square-kilometre (1,630-acre) urban area has a population (2025) of 11,442 and a population density of 1,736 inhabitants per square kilometre (4,500/sq mi).
