= Øvrebø (disambiguation) =

Øvrebø may refer to:

== People ==
- Tom Henning Øvrebø (born 1966), a former Norwegian football referee
- Lars Øvrebø (born 1984), a Norwegian football midfielder

== Places ==
- Øvrebø, a village in Vennesla Municipality in Agder county, Norway
- Øvrebø Church, a church in Vennesla Municipality in Agder county, Norway
- Øvrebø Municipality, a former municipality in the old Vest-Agder county, Norway
- Øvrebø og Hægeland Municipality, a former municipality in the old Vest-Agder county, Norway
