= Øvrebø og Hægeland Municipality =

Former municipality in Vest-Agder, Norway

Øvrebø og Hægeland Municipality Øvrebø og Hægeland herred
- Former municipality
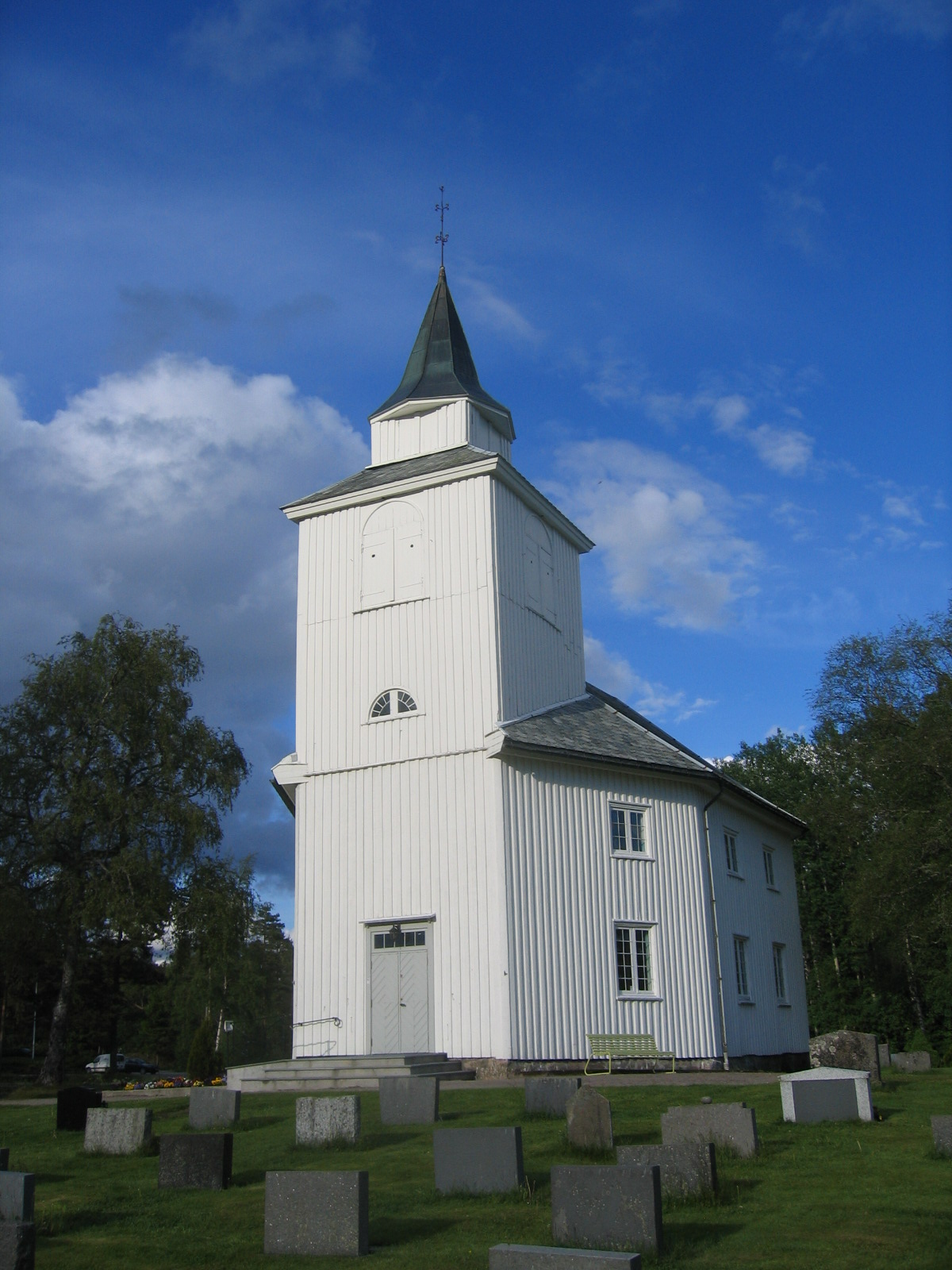
- View of one of the local churches, Hægeland Church

- Vest-Agder within Norway

- Øvrebø og Hægeland within Vest-Agder
- Coordinates: 58°17′26″N 07°46′39″E
- Country: Norway
- County: Vest-Agder
- District: Sørlandet
- Established: 1 Jan 1861
  - Preceded by: Øvrebø Municipality
- Disestablished: 1 July 1896
  - Succeeded by: Øvrebø Municipality and Hægeland Municipality
- Administrative centre: Øvrebø

Government
  - Mayor (1895–1896): Torje Horrisland

Area (upon dissolution)
  - Total: 303 km^{2} (117 sq mi)
- Highest elevation: 500.22 m (1,641.1 ft)

Population (1896)
  - Total: 1,731
  - Density: 5.71/km^{2} (14.8/sq mi)
- Time zone: UTC+01:00 (CET)
  - Summer (DST): UTC+02:00 (CEST)
- ISO 3166 code: NO-1016

Øvrebø og Hægeland is a former municipality in the old Vest-Agder county, Norway. The 303-square-kilometre (117 sq mi) municipality existed from 1865 until its dissolution in 1896. The area is now part of Vennesla Municipality in Agder county. The administrative centre was the village of Øvrebø, where Øvrebø Church is located.

== General information ==
The municipality of Øvrebø og Hægeland was established on 1 January 1861 when the old Øvrebø Municipality was divided into two separate municipalities: the southeastern district (population: 1,103) became the new Vennesla Municipality and the rest of the old municipality (population: 1,829) became the new Øvrebø og Hægeland Municipality. The new Øvrebø og Hægeland Municipality existed for only 35 years before it was dissolved. On 1 July 1896, it was divided to create two new municipalities: the southern district (population: 888) became the new Øvrebø Municipality and the northern district (population: 843) became the new Hægeland Municipality. (Later, in 1964, both Øvrebø and Hægeland were merged into Vennesla Municipality.)

=== Name ===
In 1861, the parishes of Øvrebø and Hægeland were put together to form this municipality and it was given the compound name Øvrebø og Hægeland, literally meaning "Øvrebø and Hægeland".

The parish of Øvrebø is named after the old Øvrebø farm (Old Norse: Øfribœr) since the first Øvrebø Church was built there. The first element comes from the word øfri which means "upper". The last element is bœr which means "farm" or "farmstead" (it is cognate with the Dutch language word "boer" which means "farmer"). The name therefore means "the upper farm".

The parish of Hægeland is named after the old Hægeland farm (Old Norse: Helgaland) since the first Hægeland Church was built there. The first element comes from the word heilagr which means "holy", likely since this area was important to ancient Norse pagan worship. The last element is land which means "land" or "district".

=== Churches ===
The Church of Norway had one parish (sokn) within Øvrebø og Hægeland Municipality. At the time of the municipal dissolution, it was part of the Øvrebø prestegjeld and the Torridal prosti (deanery) in the Diocese of Agder.

Churches in Øvrebø og Hægeland Municipality
Parish (sokn)	Church name	Location of the church	Year built
Øvrebø	Øvrebø Church	Øvrebø	1800
Hægeland	Hægeland Church	Hægeland	1830

== Geography ==
The municipality was located in the northern part of the present-day Vennesla Municipality, to the west of the Otra river. The highest point in the municipality was the 500.22-metre (1,641.1 ft) tall mountain Oksla, located in the northern part of the municipality. Hornnes Municipality (in Nedenes county) was located to the north, Iveland Municipality (also in Nedenes county) was located to the east, Vennesla Municipality and Oddernes Municipality were located to the southeast, Søgne Municipality was located to the south, Øyslebø og Laudal Municipality was located to the southwest, Finsland Municipality was located to the west, and Bjelland og Grindum Municipality was located to the northwest.

== Government ==
While it existed, Øvrebø og Hægeland Municipality was governed by a municipal council of directly elected representatives. The mayor was indirectly elected by a vote of the municipal council. The municipality was under the jurisdiction of the Torridal District Court and the Agder Court of Appeal.

=== Mayors ===
The mayor (Norwegian: ordfører) of Øvrebø og Hægeland Municipality was the political leader of the municipality and the chairperson of the municipal council. The following people have held this position:

- 1861–1861: Alf A. Robstad
- 1862–1873: Ole A. Egeland
- 1874–1875: A. Stubstad
- 1876–1877: Osmund J. Neset
- 1878–1885: Nils O. Homme
- 1886–1889: Anders A. Robstad
- 1890–1891: Kristen Vehus
- 1892–1895: Anders A. Robstad
- 1895–1896: Torje Horrisland

== See also ==
- List of former municipalities of Norway
