= Hægeland Municipality =

Former municipality in Vest-Agder, Norway

Hægeland Municipality Hægeland herad
- Former municipality
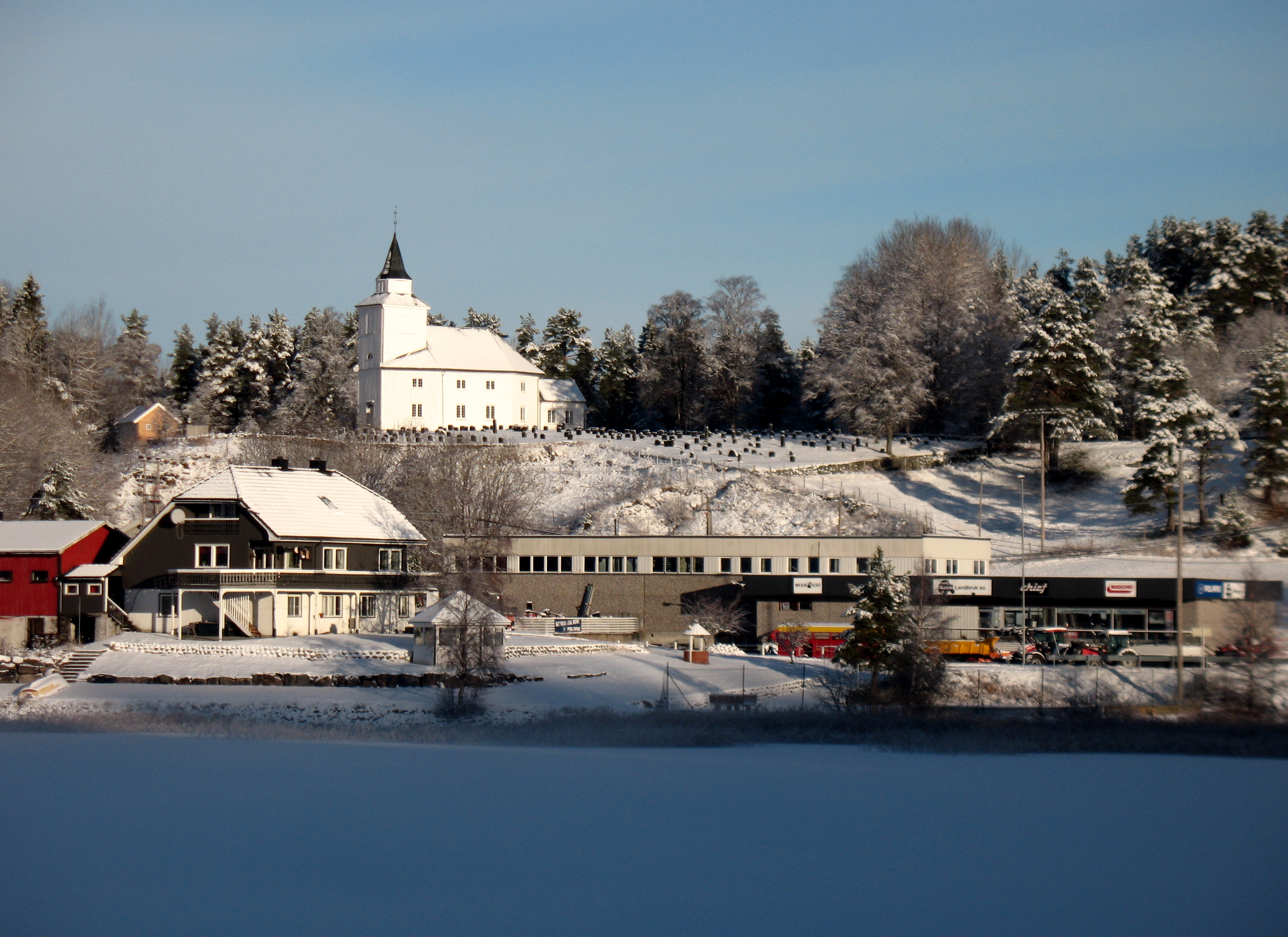
- View of the local church in Hægeland

- Vest-Agder within Norway

- Hægeland within Vest-Agder
- Coordinates: 58°23′00″N 07°44′28″E
- Country: Norway
- County: Vest-Agder
- District: Sørlandet
- Established: 1 July 1896
  - Preceded by: Øvrebø og Hægeland Municipality
- Disestablished: 1 Jan 1964
  - Succeeded by: Vennesla Municipality
- Administrative centre: Hægelandskrossen

Government
  - Mayor (1959–1963): Odd Ropstad (Sp)

Area (upon dissolution)
  - Total: 194.3 km^{2} (75.0 sq mi)
  - Rank: #375 in Norway
- Highest elevation: 500.22 m (1,641.1 ft)

Population (1963)
  - Total: 844
  - Rank: #637 in Norway
  - Density: 4.3/km^{2} (11/sq mi)
  - Change (10 years): ▼ −5.6%
- Demonym: Hægdøl

Official language
  - Norwegian form: Nynorsk
- Time zone: UTC+01:00 (CET)
  - Summer (DST): UTC+02:00 (CEST)
- ISO 3166 code: NO-1015

Hægeland is a former municipality in the old Vest-Agder county, Norway. The 194.3-square-kilometre (75.0 sq mi) municipality existed from 1896 until its dissolution in 1964. The area is now part of Vennesla Municipality in the Kristiansand Region of Agder county. The administrative centre was the village of Hægelandskrossen where Hægeland Church is located.

Prior to its dissolution in 1964, the 194.3-square-kilometre (75.0 sq mi) municipality was the 375th largest by area out of the 689 municipalities in Norway. Hægeland Municipality was the 637th most populous municipality in Norway with a population of about 844. The municipality's population density was 4.3 inhabitants per square kilometre (11/sq mi) and its population had decreased by 5.6% over the previous 10-year period.

== General information ==
The municipality of Hægeland was established on 1 July 1896 when the old Øvrebø og Hægeland Municipality was divided to create two new municipalities: the southern district (population: 888) became the new Øvrebø Municipality and the northern district (population: 843) became the new Hægeland Municipality.

During the 1960s, there were many municipal mergers across Norway due to the work of the Schei Committee. On 1 January 1964, Hægeland Municipality was dissolved and the following areas were merged to form a new, larger Vennesla Municipality (basically re-creating the old Øvrebø Municipality which existed from 1838 until 1865):

- all of Hægeland Municipality (population: 849)
- all of Vennesla Municipality (population: 7,321)
- most of Øvrebø Municipality (population: 925), except for the Eikeland area which became part of Songdalen Municipality

=== Name ===
The municipality (originally the parish) is named after the old Hægeland farm (Old Norse: Helgaland) since the first Hægeland Church was built there. The first element comes from the word heilagr which means "holy", likely since this area was important to ancient Norse pagan worship. The last element is land which means "land" or "district".

=== Churches ===
The Church of Norway had one parish (sokn) within Hægeland Municipality. At the time of the municipal dissolution, it was part of the Vennesla prestegjeld and the Otredal prosti (deanery) in the Diocese of Agder.

Churches in Hægeland Municipality
Parish (sokn)	Church name	Location of the church	Year built
Hægeland	Hægeland Church	Hægeland	1830

== Geography ==
Øvrebø Municipality was located along the west side of the river Otra. The highest point in the municipality was the 500.22-metre (1,641.1 ft) tall mountain Oksla, located in the northern part of the municipality. Hornnes Municipality (in Aust-Agder county) was located to the north, Iveland Municipality (also in Aust-Agder county) was located to the east, Vennesla Municipality was located to the southeast, Øvrebø Municipality was located to the south, Finsland Municipality was located to the southwest, and Bjelland Municipality was located to the west.

== Government ==
While it existed, Hægeland Municipality was responsible for primary education (through 10th grade), outpatient health services, senior citizen services, welfare and other social services, zoning, economic development, and municipal roads and utilities. The municipality was governed by a municipal council of directly elected representatives. The mayor was indirectly elected by a vote of the municipal council. The municipality was under the jurisdiction of the Setesdal District Court and the Agder Court of Appeal.

=== Municipal council ===
The municipal council (Herredsstyre) of Hægeland was made up of representatives that were elected to four year terms. The tables below show the historical composition of the council by political party.

Hægeland heradsstyre 1959–1963
Party name (in Nynorsk)	Number of representatives
Labour Party (Arbeidarpartiet)	3
Joint List(s) of Non-Socialist Parties (Borgarlege Felleslister)	10
Total number of members:	13
Note: On 1 January 1964, Hægeland Municipality became part of Vennesla Municipality.

Hægeland heradsstyre 1955–1959
Party name (in Nynorsk)	Number of representatives
Labour Party (Arbeidarpartiet)	4
Joint List(s) of Non-Socialist Parties (Borgarlege Felleslister)	8
Local List(s) (Lokale lister)	1
Total number of members:	13

Hægeland heradsstyre 1951–1955
Party name (in Nynorsk)	Number of representatives
Labour Party (Arbeidarpartiet)	4
Joint List(s) of Non-Socialist Parties (Borgarlege Felleslister)	8
Total number of members:	12

Hægeland heradsstyre 1947–1951
Party name (in Nynorsk)	Number of representatives
Labour Party (Arbeidarpartiet)	4
Joint List(s) of Non-Socialist Parties (Borgarlege Felleslister)	8
Total number of members:	12

Hægeland heradsstyre 1945–1947
Party name (in Nynorsk)	Number of representatives
Labour Party (Arbeidarpartiet)	4
Local List(s) (Lokale lister)	8
Total number of members:	12

Hægeland heradsstyre 1937–1941*
Party name (in Nynorsk)	Number of representatives
Labour Party (Arbeidarpartiet)	3
Farmers' Party (Bondepartiet)	5
Liberal Party (Venstre)	4
Total number of members:	12
Note: Due to the German occupation of Norway during World War II, no elections were held for new municipal councils until after the war ended in 1945.

=== Mayors ===
The mayor (Nynorsk: ordførar) of Hægeland Municipality was the political leader of the municipality and the chairperson of the municipal council. The following people have held this position:

- 1896–1910: Anders A. Robstad
- 1911–1913: Tomas Gunstveit
- 1914–1916: Jens Gunstveit
- 1917–1919: Tomas Gunstveit
- 1920–1922: Gustav Skisland
- 1923–1928: Thomas Aasen (Bp)
- 1929–1934: Torkild Aagedal
- 1935–1945: Thomas Aasen (Bp)
- 1945–1947: Gunvald A. Robstad
- 1947–1951: Nils Omdal
- 1951–1955: Bertinius Godtfredsen
- 1955–1959: Kristian Frivoll
- 1959–1963: Odd Ropstad (Sp)

== See also ==
- List of former municipalities of Norway
