= Ole Jørgensen =

Norwegian politician

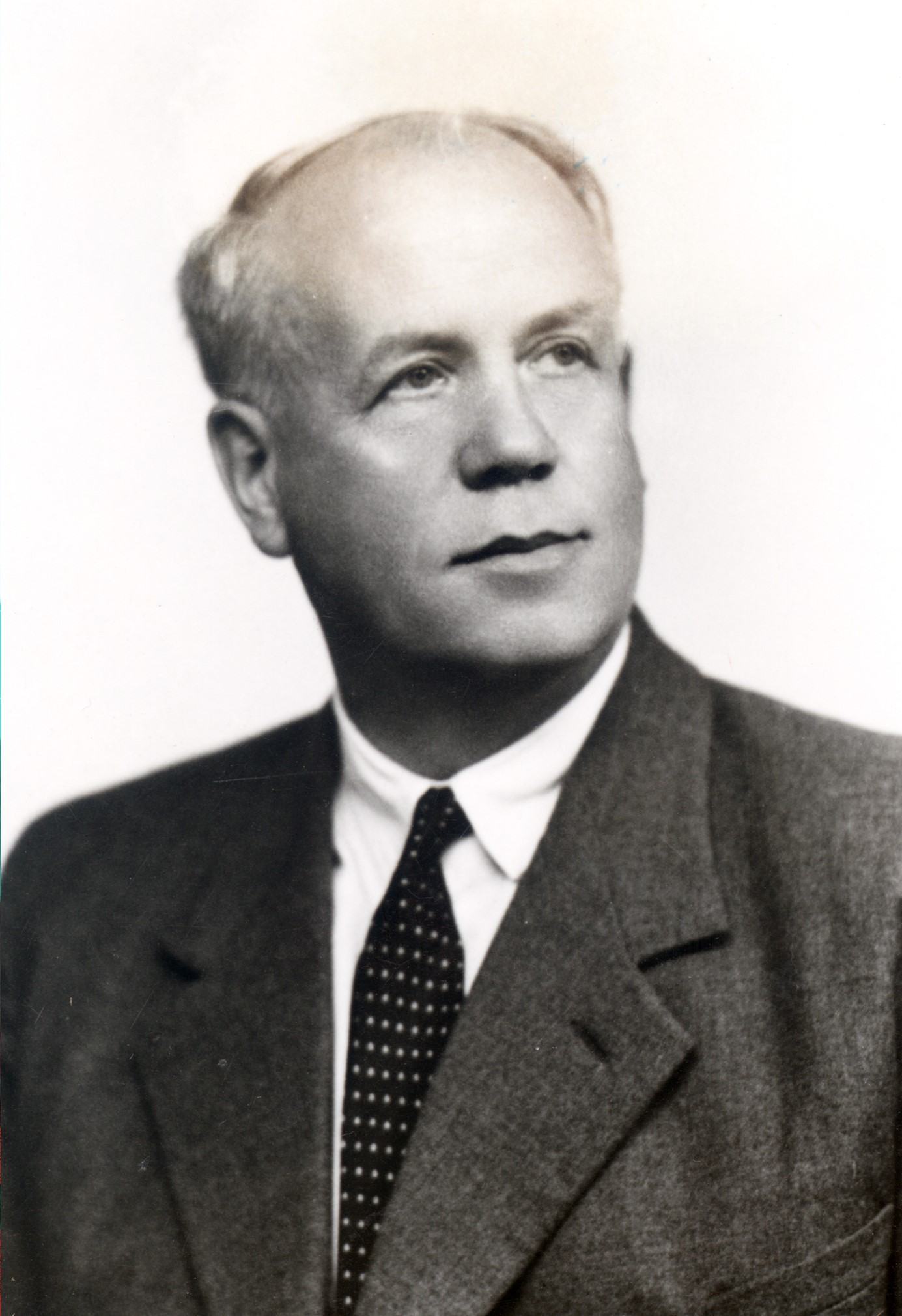
Ole Jørgensen

Ole Jørgensen (13 November 1897 – 5 July 1966) was a Norwegian politician for the Labour Party. He was born in Vennesla Municipality in Lister og Mandal county, Norway.

== Career ==
His first position in local politics was as a member of the municipal council of Øvrebø Municipality in 1924–1925. He gradually became mayor of Vennesla Municipality during the terms 1945–1947, 1947–1951 and 1951–1955, and his last term came as a regular member in 1955–1959.

He was elected to the Norwegian Parliament from Vest-Agder in 1954, and was re-elected on two occasions as well as in the 1962 revote. He had previously served in the position of deputy representative in the period 1950–1953.
