= Aalefjær =

Aalefjær is a Norwegian surname. Notable people with the surname include:

- Knut Aalefjær (born 1974), Norwegian jazz musician and composer
- Sigurd Aalefjær (1917–1991), Norwegian engineer and civil servant
