= Venneslafjorden =

Lake in Agder, Norway

- Interactive map of Venneslafjorden
- Location: Iveland Municipality, Agder
- Coordinates: 58.2775°N 7.95917°E
- Primary inflows: Otra river
- Primary outflows: Otra river
- Catchment area: 3,679 km^{2} (1,420 sq mi)
- Basin countries: Norway
- Max. length: 3.5 kilometres (2.2 mi)
- Max. width: 1 kilometre (0.62 mi)
- Surface area: 1.56 km^{2} (0.60 sq mi)
- Surface elevation: 41 metres (135 ft)
- References: NVE

Venneslafjorden is a lake in Vennesla Municipality in Agder county, Norway. The 1.56-square-kilometre (390-acre) lake is located along the river Otra. There are several islands and islets located in the northern part of the lake, the largest of which is Drivenesøya. The large village of Vennesla is located along the southern end and there are also settlements that extend along the east side of the lake. The lake is dammed as a reservoir for the Hunsfos hydropower plants.
