= Hægeland =

Village in Vennesla Municipality, Norway

Hægeland Hægelandskrossen
- Village
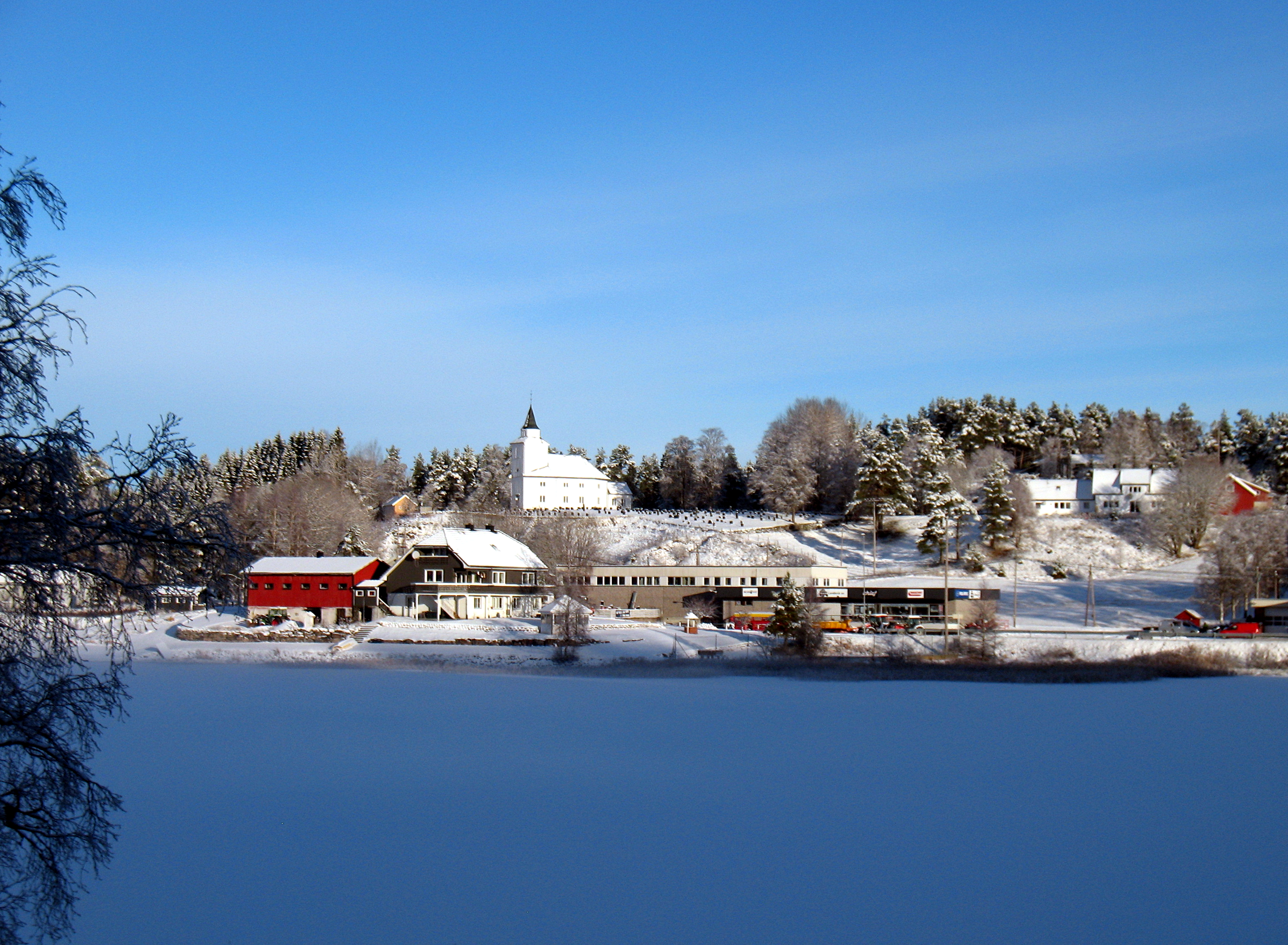
- View of the village church
- Interactive map of Hægeland
- Coordinates: 58.38343°N 7.74134°E
- Country: Norway
- Region: Southern Norway
- County: Agder
- District: Kristiansand
- Municipality: Vennesla Municipality

Area
  - Total: 0.39 km^{2} (0.15 sq mi)
- Elevation: 229 m (751 ft)

Population (2025)
  - Total: 371
  - Density: 951/km^{2} (2,460/sq mi)
- Time zone: UTC+01:00 (CET)
  - Summer (DST): UTC+02:00 (CEST)
- Post Code: 4720 Hægeland

Hægeland is a village in Vennesla Municipality in Agder county, Norway. The village is located along the northeastern shore of the lake Hægelandsvatnet, a short distance south of the Kilefjorden. The Norwegian National Road 9 (Rv9) runs north-south through the village, just past Hægeland Church. The village of Bjelland lies about 15 kilometres (9.3 mi) to the east and the villages of Skarpengland and Øvrebø both lie about 15 kilometres (9.3 mi) to the south. The village of Øvre Eikeland lies about 2 kilometres (1.2 mi) southeast of Hægeland, along the Rv9 highway.

The 0.39-square-kilometre (96-acre) village has a population (2025) of 371 and a population density of 951 inhabitants per square kilometre (2,460/sq mi).

== History ==
The village was the administrative centre of the old Hægeland Municipality which existed from 1896 until 1964 when the municipality was merged into Vennesla Municipality.

=== Name ===
The village (originally the parish) is named after the old Hægeland farm (Old Norse: Helgaland) since that is where the Hægeland Church was located. The first element of the name means "holy" (Old Norse: heilagr or Norwegian: hellig) and the last element is land which means "land". This area was important to ancient Norse pagan worship.
