= Homstean =

Village in Vennesla Municipality, Norway

Homstean Slettebrotane
- Village
- Interactive map of Homstean
- Coordinates: 58.2626°N 07.8310°E
- Country: Norway
- Region: Southern Norway
- County: Agder
- District: Kristiansand
- Municipality: Vennesla Municipality

Area
  - Total: 0.26 km^{2} (0.10 sq mi)
- Elevation: 167 m (548 ft)

Population (2025)
  - Total: 445
  - Density: 1,712/km^{2} (4,430/sq mi)
- Time zone: UTC+01:00 (CET)
  - Summer (DST): UTC+02:00 (CEST)
- Post Code: 4715 Øvrebø

Homstean or Slettebrotane is a village in Vennesla Municipality in Agder county, Norway. The village is located along the Norwegian National Road 9, about 4 kilometres (2.5 mi) south of the village of Skarpengland, just about 1.5 kilometres (0.93 mi) north of the border with Kristiansand Municipality.

The 0.26-square-kilometre (64-acre) village has a population (2025) of 445 and a population density of 1,712 inhabitants per square kilometre (4,430/sq mi).

The small farming village of Mushom lies about 2.5 kilometres (1.6 mi) to the west. That area has had some notable archaeological finds over the year including a very old ski that is now in a museum in Oslo.
