= Øvre Eikeland =

Village in Vennesla Municipality, Norway

- Village
- Interactive map of Øvre Eikeland
- Coordinates: 58.3715°N 07.7557°E
- Country: Norway
- Region: Southern Norway
- County: Agder
- District: Kristiansand
- Municipality: Vennesla Municipality
- Elevation: 297 m (974 ft)
- Time zone: UTC+01:00 (CET)
  - Summer (DST): UTC+02:00 (CEST)
- Post Code: 4720 Hægeland

Øvre Eikeland or simply Eikeland is a village in Vennesla Municipality in Agder county, Norway. The village is located on the south side of the Norwegian National Road 9, about 2 kilometres (1.2 mi) southeast of the village of Hægeland. The lake Eikelandsvatnet lies a short distance east of the village.
