= Mushom =

Village in Vennesla Municipality, Norway

- Smal farm
- Interactive map of Mushom
- Coordinates: 58.2681°N 07.8049°E
- Country: Norway
- Region: Southern Norway
- County: Agder
- District: Kristiansand
- Municipality: Vennesla Municipality
- Elevation: 233 m (764 ft)
- Time zone: UTC+01:00 (CET)
  - Summer (DST): UTC+02:00 (CEST)
- Post Code: 4715 Øvrebø

Mushom is a small farm area in Vennesla Municipality in Agder county, Norway. The area is located about 2.5 kilometres (1.6 mi) west of the village of Homstean.

The so-called "Øvrebø-ski" was found in a marsh at Mushom. For many years it was considered Norway's oldest preserved ski. The artifact can now be seen at the Holmenkollen Ski Museum in Oslo.
