= Hunsfos Fabrikker =

Norwegian paper factory and company

Hunsfos Fabrikker was a paper factory and company in Vennesla Municipality in Agder county, Norway.

It was founded in 1886 as a takeover of the facilities of Otterelvens Papirfabrik, founded 1873 but later liquidated. It has harnessed the hydropower in the river Otra, and in 1926 it established a power plant at the waterfall Hunsfossen. It produces paper, mostly for the export market, by buying cellulose and pulp from elsewhere. It owned the company Norsk Wallboard from 1989 to 1997, and was sold to Cham-Tenero Paper Mills in 1999, whereby it was delisted from Oslo Stock Exchange.

The factory was closed in autumn 2011.
