= Skarpengland =

Village in Vennesla Municipality, Norway

- Village
- Interactive map of Skarpengland
- Coordinates: 58.2954°N 07.8404°E
- Country: Norway
- Region: Southern Norway
- County: Agder
- District: Kristiansand
- Municipality: Vennesla Municipality

Area
  - Total: 0.43 km^{2} (0.17 sq mi)
- Elevation: 186 m (610 ft)

Population (2025)
  - Total: 581
  - Density: 1,351/km^{2} (3,500/sq mi)
- Time zone: UTC+01:00 (CET)
  - Summer (DST): UTC+02:00 (CEST)
- Post Code: 4715 Øvrebø

Skarpengland is a village in Vennesla Municipality in Agder county, Norway. The village is located along the Norwegian National Road 9 about 3 kilometres (1.9 mi) east of the village of Øvrebø and about 4 kilometres (2.5 mi) north of Homstean. The large village of Vennesla lies about 10 kilometres (6.2 mi) to the southeast and the city of Kristiansand lies about 23 kilometres (14 mi) to the south.

The 0.43-square-kilometre (110-acre) village has a population (2025) of 581 which gives the village a population density of 1,351 inhabitants per square kilometre (3,500/sq mi).

== History ==
The village of Skarpengland was the administrative centre of the old Øvrebø Municipality from 1838 until 1964 when it was merged into Vennesla Municipality.
