= Lars Øvrebø =

Norwegian footballer (born 1984)

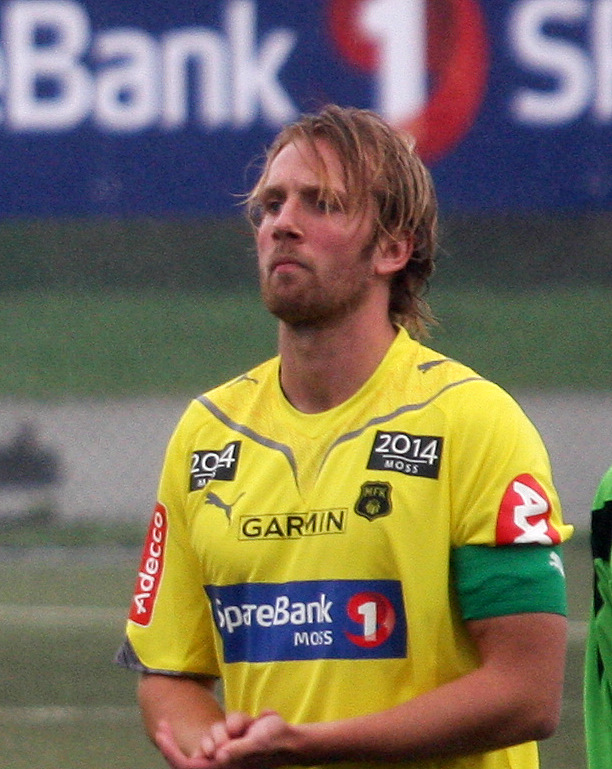

Personal information
- Full name: Lars Oscar Øvrebø
- Date of birth: 15 July 1984 (age 42)
- Height: 1.81 m (5 ft 11 1/2 in)
- Position: Midfielder

Youth career
- 1989–2002: Vålerenga

Senior career*
Years	Team	Apps	(Gls)
2002–2004	Vålerenga	8	(0)
2005–2006	Drøbak/Frogn		
2006	→ Moss (loan)		
2007–2009	Moss		
2010	Drøbak/Frogn		
- Lille Tøyen
- * Club domestic league appearances and goals

Lars Øvrebø (born 15 July 1984) is a Norwegian football midfielder.

He started his career at Vålerenga IF. He got one Norwegian Premier League game in 2002 and seven in 2004. He left after the 2004 season, and joined Drøbak/Frogn IF in the summer of 2005. In the latter part of the 2006 season he was loaned by Moss FK. After the 2006 season he signed a permanent contract. After the 2009 season he went on to Drøbak/Frogn, then played on a lower level with Lille Tøyen FK.
