= Sigurd Aalefjær =

Norwegian engineer

Sigurd Arthur Aalefjær (14 September 1917 – 10 March 1991) was a Norwegian engineer, civil servant and director of Norwegian hydropower plants.

He was born in Bend, Oregon as a son of Wilhelm Torjussen Aalefjær (1881–1969) and Inger Larsen Kostøl (1890–1975); the family soon moved to Vennesla in Vest-Agder, Norway. He married Magda Synnøve Berg (1920–2002) in 1943. He resided and died in Bærum.

He finished his secondary education at Kristiansand Cathedral School in 1937 and graduated as a construction engineer from the Norwegian Institute of Technology in Trondheim during 1941. He worked for the Norwegian Water Resources and Energy Agency from 1942 to 1946, Drammens Elektrisitetsverk from 1946 to 1949 and the Water Resources and Energy Agency again from 1949. From 1960 to his retirement in 1984 he was the director of Statskraftverkene (now Statkraft).

He was decorated as a Knight, First Class of the Order of St. Olav in 1983.
