= Vennesla Municipality =

Municipality in Agder, Norway

Vennesla Municipality Vennesla kommune
- Municipality
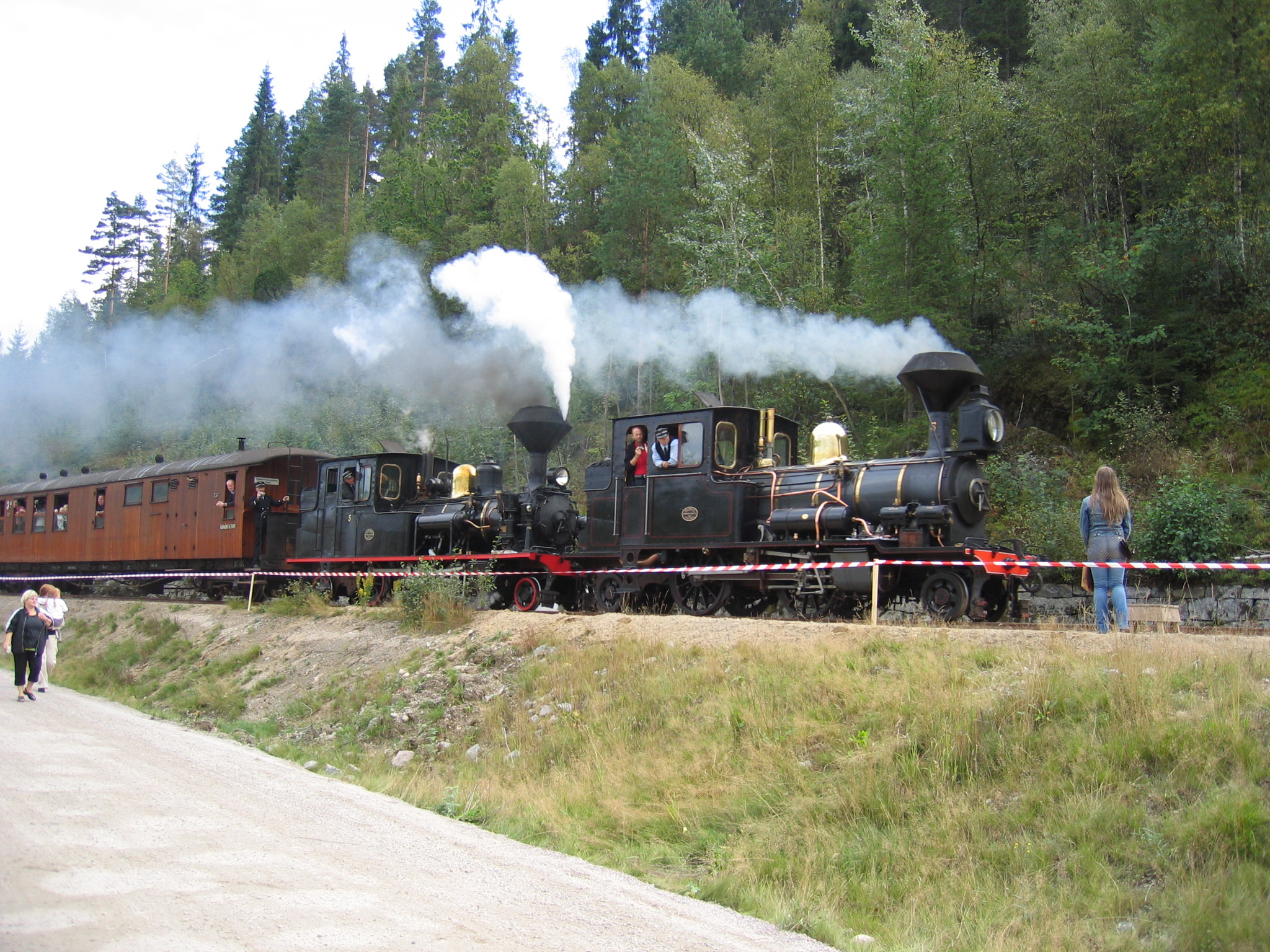
- View of the Setesdal Line railway museum in Vennesla municipality

- Coat of arms

- Agder within Norway

- Vennesla within Agder
- Coordinates: 58°18′38″N 7°51′25″E
- Country: Norway
- County: Agder
- District: Sørlandet
- Established: 1 Jan 1861
  - Preceded by: Øvrebø Municipality
- Administrative centre: Vennesla

Government
  - Mayor (2024): Nils Olav Larsen (KrF)

Area
  - Total: 384.48 km^{2} (148.45 sq mi)
  - Land: 362.12 km^{2} (139.82 sq mi)
  - Water: 22.36 km^{2} (8.63 sq mi) 5.8%
  - Rank: #241 in Norway
- Highest elevation: 500.22 m (1,641.1 ft)

Population (2026)
  - Total: 15,772
  - Rank: #79 in Norway
  - Density: 43.6/km^{2} (113/sq mi)
  - Change (10 years): ▲ +10.2%
- Demonym: Venndøl

Official language
  - Norwegian form: Neutral
- Time zone: UTC+01:00 (CET)
  - Summer (DST): UTC+02:00 (CEST)
- ISO 3166 code: NO-4223
- Website: Official website

Vennesla is a municipality in Agder county, Norway. It is located in the traditional district of Sørlandet. The administrative centre of the municipality is the village of Vennesla. Other villages in Vennesla include Grovane, Hægeland, Homstean, Mushom, Øvre Eikeland, Øvrebø, Røyknes, and Skarpengland. Vennesla lies about 17 kilometres (11 mi) north of the city of Kristiansand in the Otra river valley.

The 384-square-kilometre (148 sq mi) municipality is the 241st largest by area out of the 357 municipalities in Norway. Vennesla Municipality is the 79th most populous municipality in Norway with a population of 15,772. The municipality's population density is 43.6 inhabitants per square kilometre (113/sq mi) and its population has increased by 10.2% over the previous 10-year period.

== General information ==
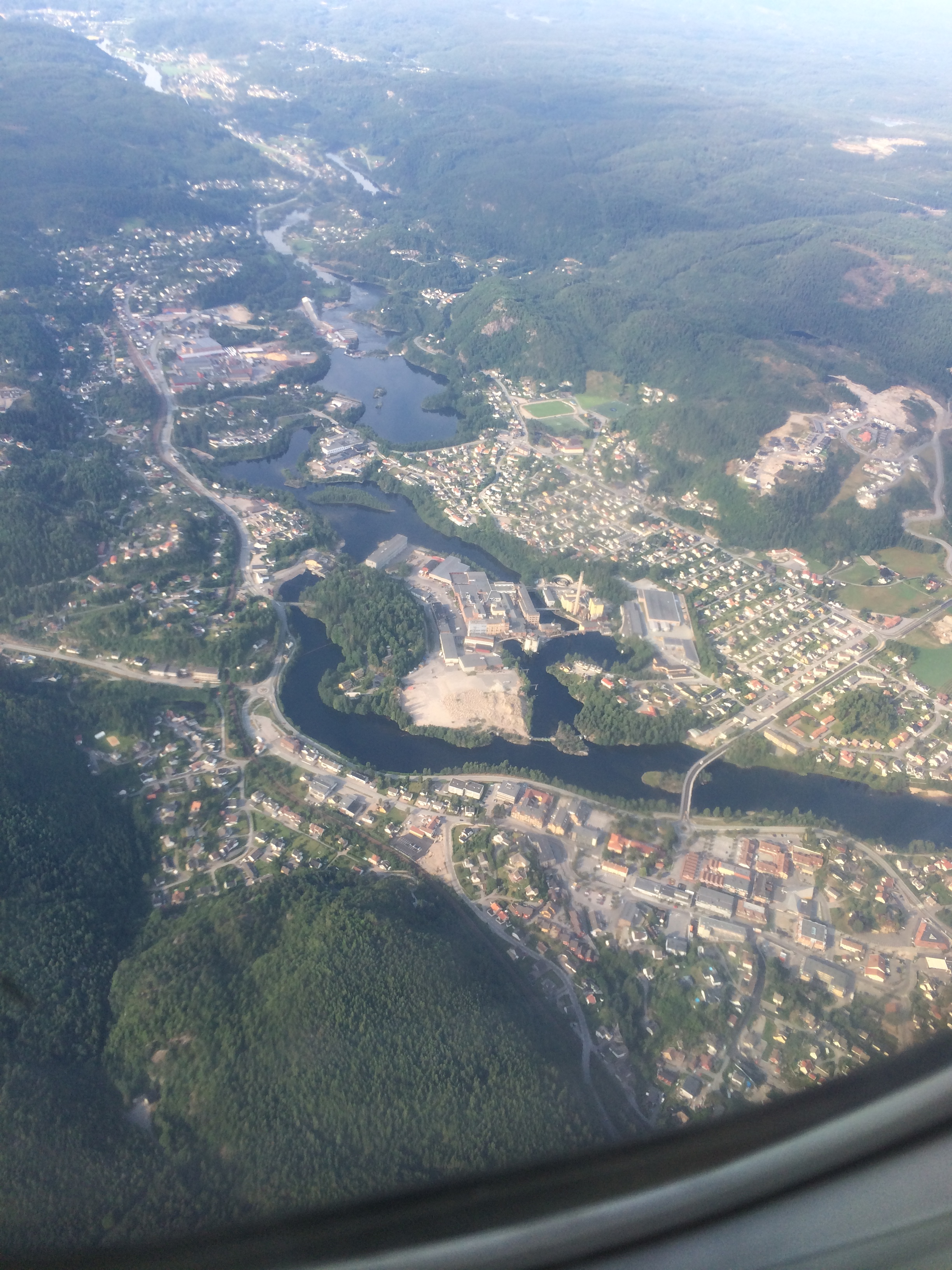
View of the village of Vennesla

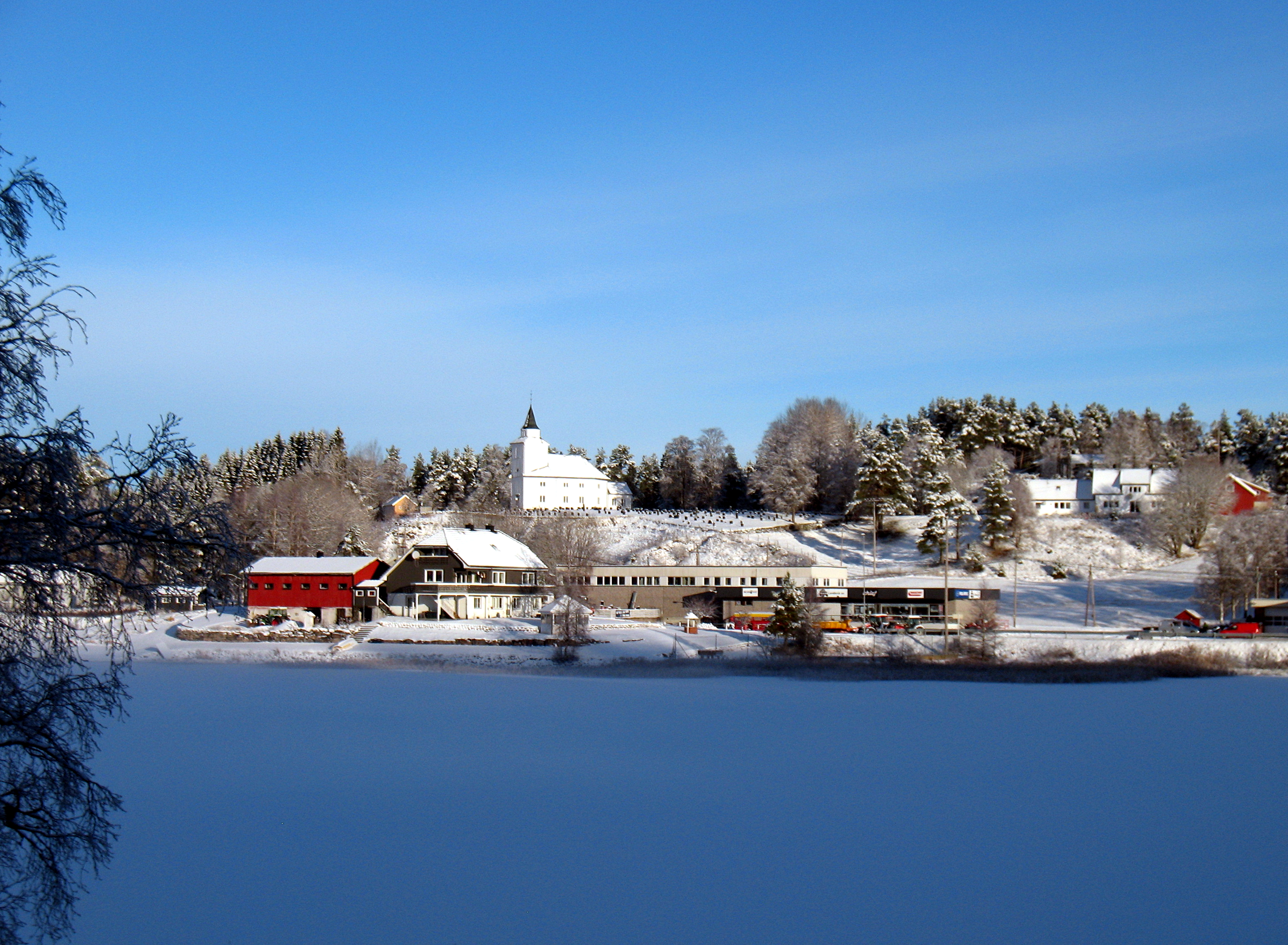
View of the village of Hægeland and Hægeland Church

The parish of Vennesla was established as a municipality on 1 January 1861, when the large Øvrebø Municipality was dissolved and split into two separate municipalities: the southeastern district (population: 1,103) became the new Vennesla Municipality and the rest of the old municipality (population: 1,829) became the new Øvrebø og Hægeland Municipality.

During the 1960s, there were many municipal mergers across Norway due to the work of the Schei Committee. On 1 January 1964, Vennesla Municipality was enlarged by merging the following areas to form a larger Vennesla Municipality:

- all of Vennesla Municipality (population: 7,321)
- all of Hægeland Municipality (population: 849)
- most of Øvrebø Municipality (population: 925), except for the Eikeland area which became part of the new Songdalen Municipality

On 1 January 1978, a small area of Vennesla Municipality (population: 10) was transferred to the neighboring Songdalen Municipality. Then again on 1 January 1984, the unpopulated Hauglandsvatnet area was transferred from Vennesla Municipality to Songdalen Municipality. On 1 January 1990, the unpopulated Røssebrekka area, just east of the village of Vennesla was transferred from Kristiansand Municipality to Vennesla Municipality.

=== Name ===
The municipality (originally the parish) is named after the old Vennesla farm (Old Norse: Vendilslá) since the first Vennesla Church was built there. The first element is vendil which comes from the word vǫndr which means "small twig". This may have been an old name for an arm of Venneslafjorden. The last element is lá which means "swamp" or "shallow water".

=== Coat of arms ===
The coat of arms was adopted on 15 May 1971. The blazon is "Gules, three barrulets wavy in bend sinister with six tree trunks with branches issuant in chief and two cogwheels in sinister base Or". This means the arms have a red field (background) and the charge is three wavy lines diagonally crossing the arms with six trees above the lines and two cogwheels below. The charge has a tincture of Or which means it is commonly colored yellow, but if it is made out of metal, then gold is used. The three wavy lines symbolises the river Otra, which runs through the municipality. The six trees symbolize the importance of forestry to the local economy. The cogwheels symbolize the local industry. There is a three-pointed mural crown on top of the arms which represent the three municipalities that were merged in 1964 to form the present municipality: Vennesla, Øvrebø, and Hægeland. The arms were designed by Alv Erikstad. The municipal flag has the same design as the coat of arms.

=== Churches ===
The Church of Norway has three parishes (sokn) within Vennesla Municipality. It is part of the Otredal deanery in the Diocese of Agder og Telemark.

Churches in Vennesla Municipality
Parish (sokn)	Church name	Location of the church	Year built
Hægeland	Hægeland Church	Hægeland	1830
Vennesla	Vennesla Church	Vennesla	1829
Øvrebø	Øvrebø Church	Øvrebø	1800

== Government ==
Vennesla Municipality is responsible for primary education (through 10th grade), outpatient health services, senior citizen services, welfare and other social services, zoning, economic development, and municipal roads and utilities. The municipality is governed by a municipal council of directly elected representatives. The mayor is indirectly elected by a vote of the municipal council. The municipality is under the jurisdiction of the Agder District Court and the Agder Court of Appeal.

=== Municipal council ===
The municipal council (Kommunestyre) of Vennesla Municipality is made up of 27 representatives that are elected to four year terms. The tables below show the current and historical composition of the council by political party.

Vennesla kommunestyre 2023–2027
Party name (in Norwegian)	Number of representatives
Labour Party (Arbeiderpartiet)	4
Progress Party (Fremskrittspartiet)	4
Conservative Party (Høyre)	4
The Conservatives (Konservativt)	2
Christian Democratic Party (Kristelig Folkeparti)	7
Centre Party (Senterpartiet)	5
Socialist Left Party (Sosialistisk Venstreparti)	1
Total number of members:	27

Vennesla kommunestyre 2019–2023
Party name (in Norwegian)	Number of representatives
Labour Party (Arbeiderpartiet)	5
Progress Party (Fremskrittspartiet)	3
Conservative Party (Høyre)	3
The Christians Party (Partiet De Kristne)	1
Christian Democratic Party (Kristelig Folkeparti)	8
Centre Party (Senterpartiet)	6
Socialist Left Party (Sosialistisk Venstreparti)	1
Total number of members:	27

Vennesla kommunestyre 2015–2019
Party name (in Norwegian)	Number of representatives
Labour Party (Arbeiderpartiet)	7
Progress Party (Fremskrittspartiet)	3
Conservative Party (Høyre)	3
The Christians Party (Partiet De Kristne)	1
Christian Democratic Party (Kristelig Folkeparti)	8
Centre Party (Senterpartiet)	4
Liberal Party (Venstre)	1
Total number of members:	27

Vennesla kommunestyre 2011–2015
Party name (in Norwegian)	Number of representatives
Labour Party (Arbeiderpartiet)	8
Progress Party (Fremskrittspartiet)	4
Conservative Party (Høyre)	4
Christian Democratic Party (Kristelig Folkeparti)	8
Centre Party (Senterpartiet)	2
Liberal Party (Venstre)	1
Total number of members:	27

Vennesla kommunestyre 2007–2011
Party name (in Norwegian)	Number of representatives
Labour Party (Arbeiderpartiet)	7
Progress Party (Fremskrittspartiet)	7
Conservative Party (Høyre)	2
Christian Democratic Party (Kristelig Folkeparti)	9
Centre Party (Senterpartiet)	2
Total number of members:	27

Vennesla kommunestyre 2003–2007
Party name (in Norwegian)	Number of representatives
Labour Party (Arbeiderpartiet)	8
Progress Party (Fremskrittspartiet)	5
Conservative Party (Høyre)	2
Christian Democratic Party (Kristelig Folkeparti)	8
Centre Party (Senterpartiet)	2
Socialist Left Party (Sosialistisk Venstreparti)	2
Total number of members:	27

Vennesla kommunestyre 1999–2003
Party name (in Norwegian)	Number of representatives
Labour Party (Arbeiderpartiet)	9
Progress Party (Fremskrittspartiet)	5
Conservative Party (Høyre)	3
Christian Democratic Party (Kristelig Folkeparti)	12
Centre Party (Senterpartiet)	3
Socialist Left Party (Sosialistisk Venstreparti)	2
Liberal Party (Venstre)	1
Total number of members:	35

Vennesla kommunestyre 1995–1999
Party name (in Norwegian)	Number of representatives
Labour Party (Arbeiderpartiet)	12
Progress Party (Fremskrittspartiet)	3
Conservative Party (Høyre)	2
Christian Democratic Party (Kristelig Folkeparti)	13
Centre Party (Senterpartiet)	3
Socialist Left Party (Sosialistisk Venstreparti)	1
Liberal Party (Venstre)	1
Total number of members:	35

Vennesla kommunestyre 1991–1995
Party name (in Norwegian)	Number of representatives
Labour Party (Arbeiderpartiet)	14
Progress Party (Fremskrittspartiet)	2
Conservative Party (Høyre)	2
Christian Democratic Party (Kristelig Folkeparti)	11
Centre Party (Senterpartiet)	4
Socialist Left Party (Sosialistisk Venstreparti)	2
Total number of members:	35

Vennesla kommunestyre 1987–1991
Party name (in Norwegian)	Number of representatives
Labour Party (Arbeiderpartiet)	16
Progress Party (Fremskrittspartiet)	3
Conservative Party (Høyre)	3
Christian Democratic Party (Kristelig Folkeparti)	9
Centre Party (Senterpartiet)	2
Socialist Left Party (Sosialistisk Venstreparti)	1
Liberal Party (Venstre)	1
Total number of members:	35

Vennesla kommunestyre 1983–1987
Party name (in Norwegian)	Number of representatives
Labour Party (Arbeiderpartiet)	17
Progress Party (Fremskrittspartiet)	1
Conservative Party (Høyre)	4
Christian Democratic Party (Kristelig Folkeparti)	10
Centre Party (Senterpartiet)	2
Socialist Left Party (Sosialistisk Venstreparti)	1
Total number of members:	35

Vennesla kommunestyre 1979–1983
Party name (in Norwegian)	Number of representatives
Labour Party (Arbeiderpartiet)	15
Conservative Party (Høyre)	5
Christian Democratic Party (Kristelig Folkeparti)	9
New People's Party (Nye Folkepartiet)	1
Centre Party (Senterpartiet)	3
Socialist Left Party (Sosialistisk Venstreparti)	1
Liberal Party (Venstre)	1
Total number of members:	35

Vennesla kommunestyre 1975–1979
Party name (in Norwegian)	Number of representatives
Labour Party (Arbeiderpartiet)	15
Conservative Party (Høyre)	2
Christian Democratic Party (Kristelig Folkeparti)	10
New People's Party (Nye Folkepartiet)	2
Centre Party (Senterpartiet)	4
Socialist Left Party (Sosialistisk Venstreparti)	1
Liberal Party (Venstre)	1
Total number of members:	35

Vennesla kommunestyre 1971–1975
Party name (in Norwegian)	Number of representatives
Labour Party (Arbeiderpartiet)	17
Conservative Party (Høyre)	1
Christian Democratic Party (Kristelig Folkeparti)	6
Centre Party (Senterpartiet)	4
Liberal Party (Venstre)	5
Socialist common list (Venstresosialistiske felleslister)	2
Total number of members:	35

Vennesla kommunestyre 1967–1971
Party name (in Norwegian)	Number of representatives
Labour Party (Arbeiderpartiet)	18
Conservative Party (Høyre)	1
Christian Democratic Party (Kristelig Folkeparti)	5
Centre Party (Senterpartiet)	3
Socialist People's Party (Sosialistisk Folkeparti)	2
Liberal Party (Venstre)	6
Total number of members:	35

Vennesla kommunestyre 1963–1967
Party name (in Norwegian)	Number of representatives
Labour Party (Arbeiderpartiet)	19
Conservative Party (Høyre)	1
Christian Democratic Party (Kristelig Folkeparti)	4
Centre Party (Senterpartiet)	3
Socialist People's Party (Sosialistisk Folkeparti)	2
Liberal Party (Venstre)	6
Total number of members:	35
Note: On 1 January 1964, Øvrebø Municipality and Hægeland Municipality became part of Vennesla Municipality.

Vennesla herredsstyre 1959–1963
Party name (in Norwegian)	Number of representatives
Labour Party (Arbeiderpartiet)	13
Communist Party (Kommunistiske Parti)	1
Christian Democratic Party (Kristelig Folkeparti)	3
Centre Party (Senterpartiet)	1
Liberal Party (Venstre)	5
Total number of members:	23

Vennesla herredsstyre 1955–1959
Party name (in Norwegian)	Number of representatives
Labour Party (Arbeiderpartiet)	13
Communist Party (Kommunistiske Parti)	2
Christian Democratic Party (Kristelig Folkeparti)	3
Farmers' Party (Bondepartiet)	1
Liberal Party (Venstre)	4
Total number of members:	23

Vennesla herredsstyre 1951–1955
Party name (in Norwegian)	Number of representatives
Labour Party (Arbeiderpartiet)	12
Communist Party (Kommunistiske Parti)	2
Christian Democratic Party (Kristelig Folkeparti)	2
Liberal Party (Venstre)	4
Total number of members:	20

Vennesla herredsstyre 1947–1951
Party name (in Norwegian)	Number of representatives
Labour Party (Arbeiderpartiet)	9
Communist Party (Kommunistiske Parti)	2
Joint list of the Liberal Party (Venstre) and the Radical People's Party (Radikale Folkepartiet)	5
Total number of members:	16

Vennesla herredsstyre 1945–1947
Party name (in Norwegian)	Number of representatives
Labour Party (Arbeiderpartiet)	9
Communist Party (Kommunistiske Parti)	2
Joint list of the Liberal Party (Venstre) and the Radical People's Party (Radikale Folkepartiet)	5
Total number of members:	16

Vennesla herredsstyre 1937–1941*
Party name (in Norwegian)	Number of representatives
Labour Party (Arbeiderpartiet)	11
Liberal Party (Venstre)	5
Total number of members:	16
Note: Due to the German occupation of Norway during World War II, no elections were held for new municipal councils until after the war ended in 1945.

=== Mayors ===
The mayor (Norwegian: ordfører) of Vennesla Municipality is the political leader of the municipality and the chairperson of the municipal council. The following people have held this position:

- 1861–1866: Nils Robstad
- 1867–1868: Even S. Drivenes
- 1869–1876: T.A. Vennesland
- 1877–1880: Nils Robstad (V)
- 1881–1884: Endre Moseid (V)
- 1885–1890: Nils Robstad (V)
- 1891–1898: Endre Moseid (MV)
- 1899–1902: Salve N. Robstad (V)
- 1903–1905: Endre Moseid (V)
- 1906–1908: Olaf Vennesland (V)
- 1909–1911: Askild Røskeland (V)
- 1912–1914: Olaf Vennesland (V)
- 1915–1920: A.T. Askedal (Ap)
- 1921–1923: Gabriel Moseid (Bp)
- 1924–1929: Anders S. Robstad (Ap)
- 1930–1941: Jørgen A. Robstad (Ap)
- 1941–1945: Thorkild O. Haus (NS)
- 1945–1945: Jørgen A. Robstad (Ap)
- 1946–1954: Ole Jørgensen (Ap)
- 1954–1957: Sverre Vennesland (Ap)
- 1958–1959: Otto Heiseldal (Ap)
- 1960–1973: Engly Lie (Ap)
- 1974–1975: Tore Robstad (Ap)
- 1976–1983: Ragnar Krogstad (KrF)
- 1984–1989: Tore Robstad (Ap)
- 1990–1999: John Edvard Olsen (KrF)
- 1999–2017: Torhild Bransdal (KrF)
- 2017–present: Nils Olav Larsen (KrF)

== Geography ==
Vennesla Municipality is situated in Agder county, Norway, about 17 kilometres (11 mi) north of the city of Kristiansand. Evje og Hornnes Municipality is located to the north, Birkenes Municipality and Iveland Municipality are located to the east, Kristiansand Municipality is located to the south and west, and Lindesnes Municipality is located to the west.

The river Otra runs through the municipality from north to south. Both of the lakes Kilefjorden and Venneslafjorden are located along the river. The river Songdalselva runs through the western part of the municipality. The highest point in the municipality is the 500.22-metre (1,641.1 ft) tall mountain Oksla, located near the northwestern border with Lindesnes Municipality.

=== Climate ===
Climate data for Vennesla
Month	Jan	Feb	Mar	Apr	May	Jun	Jul	Aug	Sep	Oct	Nov	Dec	Year
Daily mean °C (°F)	−2.0 (28.4)	−2.1 (28.2)	0.8 (33.4)	4.5 (40.1)	10.0 (50.0)	14.2 (57.6)	15.7 (60.3)	15.0 (59.0)	11.5 (52.7)	8.0 (46.4)	2.8 (37.0)	−0.4 (31.3)	6.5 (43.7)
Average precipitation mm (inches)	126 (5.0)	82 (3.2)	89 (3.5)	58 (2.3)	85 (3.3)	73 (2.9)	86 (3.4)	115 (4.5)	143 (5.6)	169 (6.7)	160 (6.3)	119 (4.7)	1,305 (51.4)
Source: Norwegian Meteorological Institute

== Economy ==
Vennesla (mostly the village of Vennesla) has a small industrial base, primarily with Hunsfos Fabrikker AS, a paper mill, as the cornerstone of the community. During recent decades, however, the number of employees has drastically declined from around 1,200 in the 1970s, to 200 in 2005 and 120 in 2007. In 2010 there was only 135 employees at the paper mill. In 2011, Hunsfos Fabrikker AS celebrated 125 years as a paper mill but later the same year finally ceased production and was declared bankrupt.

During Q4 2022, "one hundred plus" workers at Huntonit, a cornerstone of the community, were scheduled for a temporary Layoff (from work); that's a large part of the company's work force; there is no fixed schedule for returning to work.

== Media ==
The newspaper Vennesla Tidende has been published in Vennesla since 1989.

== Attractions ==
=== Vikeland Hovedgård ===
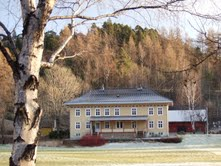
Vikeland Hovedgård

Vikeland Hovedgård is a manor house located along the Otra River in the village of Vennesla. Vigeland Manor was completed in 1847. The building was constructed of wood in both Empire and Swiss style. It was built as part of Vigeland Brug, then one of the largest sawmills in the area. Vigeland Manor was built by Caspar Wild who bought the farm and adjacent sawmill in 1833. In 1894, the farm was sold to John Clarke Hawkshaw whose family retained the manor until around 1960. The current annex was built around 1900. During the 1980s, there was restoration with the main building subsequently used as lodging, corporate, and meeting facilities.

The manor house has been said to be haunted by a ghost known as "the Blue Lady" (den Blå Dama). Mari was a farm worker who fell in love with the owner's son. They were not allowed to marry, so it is said Mari committed suicide in the "blue room", hence the title "the Blue Lady".

=== Vennesla Church ===
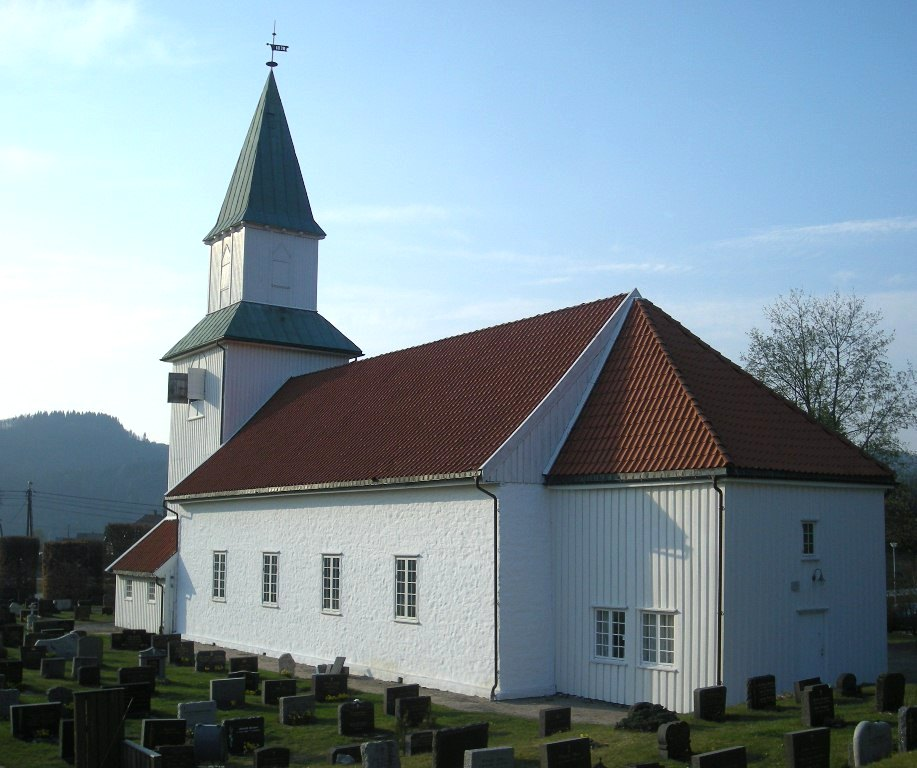
Vennesla Church

Vennesla Church (Vennesla Kirke) serves Vennesla parish in Otredal deanery (Otredal prosti). The church was completed in 1829 and consecrated the following year. The church was built of stone and brick, while the west tower with side buildings are wooden. The church replaced a church from the first half of the 1600s. The tower was made higher in 1886, and the interior was restored in 1925.

=== Vindbjart Football Club ===
The football club of Vennesla is Vindbjart FK, founded in 1896. Vindbjart is currently playing in the Norwegian Third Division and the stadium is Moseidmoen gress in the village of Vennesla.

== Notable people ==
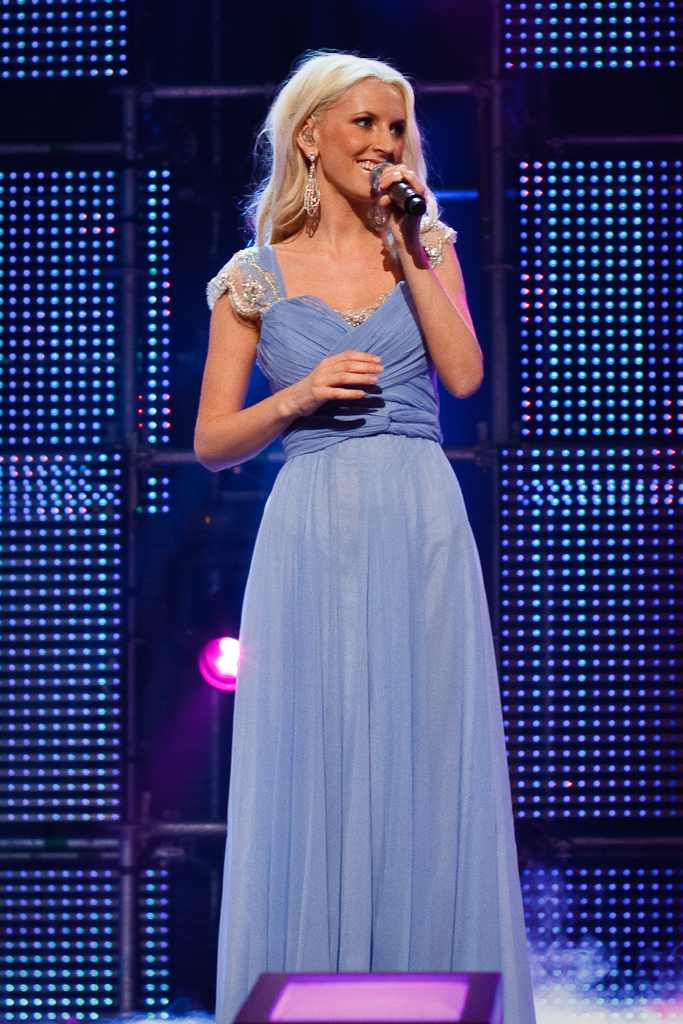
Maria Arredondo, 2010

- Gabriel Moseid (1882 in Vennesla – 1961), a politician who was Mayor of Vennesla in 1922
- Ole Jørgensen (1897–1966), a politician and Mayor of Vennesla during the 1940s & 1950s
- Sigurd Aalefjær (1917–1991), an engineer and director of hydropower plants who grew up in Vennesla
- Engly Lie (1919 in Vennesla – 2001), a carpenter and politician who was Mayor of Vennesla in 1959
- Børre Knudsen (1937 in Vennesla – 2014), a Lutheran priest and anti-abortion activist
- Kristen Gislefoss (born 1954 in Vennesla), a meteorologist, prime time weather presenter for NRK
- Kjetil Nordhus (born 1975 in Vennesla), a singer, composer, and music producer
- Jorun Stiansen (born 1984), a pop singer and artist who grew up in Vennesla
- Maria Arredondo (born 1985 in Vennesla), a pop singer

== Twin towns – sister cities ==
Vennesla has sister city agreements with the following places:

- Katrineholm, Sweden
- Odder, Denmark
- Salo, Finland

== See also ==
- Vennesla Library and Culture House
