= Øvrebø Municipality =

Former municipality in Vest-Agder, Norway

Øvrebø Municipality Øvrebø herad
- Former municipality
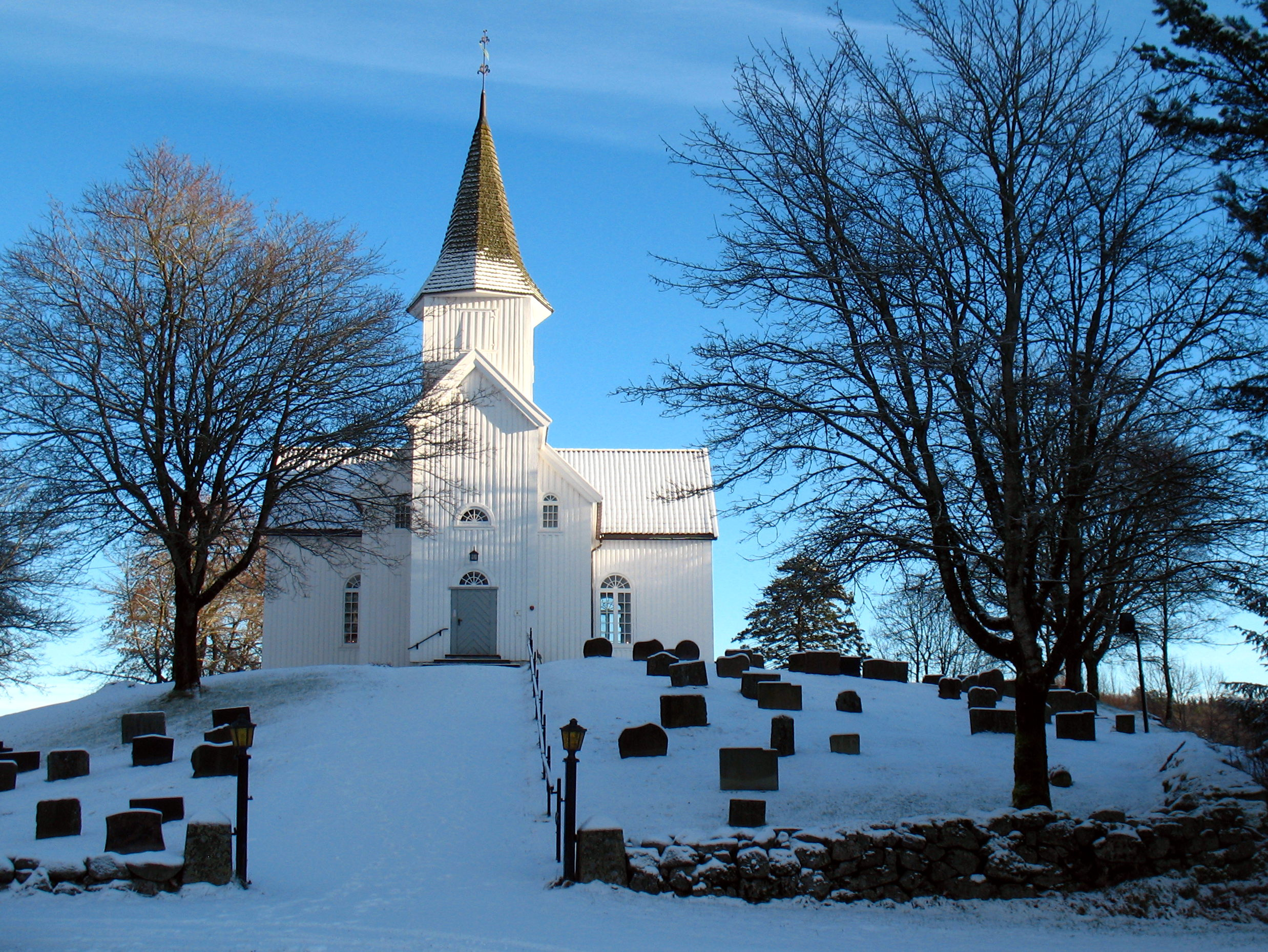
- View of the local Øvrebø Church

- Vest-Agder within Norway

- Øvrebø within Vest-Agder
- Coordinates: 58°17′29″N 07°46′42″E
- Country: Norway
- County: Vest-Agder
- District: Sørlandet
- Established: 1 Jan 1838
  - Created as: Formannskapsdistrikt
- Disestablished: 1 Jan 1861
  - Succeeded by: Øvrebø og Hægeland Municipality and Vennesla Municipality
- Re-established: 1 July 1896
  - Preceded by: Øvrebø og Hægeland Municipality
- Disestablished: 1 Jan 1964
  - Succeeded by: Vennesla Municipality
- Administrative centre: Skarpengland

Government
  - Mayor (1960-1963): Tellef Lie

Area (upon dissolution)
  - Total: 108.98 km^{2} (42.08 sq mi)
  - Rank: #501 in Norway
- Highest elevation: 382 m (1,253 ft)

Population (1963)
  - Total: 959
  - Rank: #618 in Norway
  - Density: 8.8/km^{2} (23/sq mi)
  - Change (10 years): ▲ +5.3%

Official language
  - Norwegian form: Nynorsk
- Time zone: UTC+01:00 (CET)
  - Summer (DST): UTC+02:00 (CEST)
- ISO 3166 code: NO-1016

Øvrebø is a former municipality in the old Vest-Agder county, Norway. The municipality existed twice during the 19th and 20th centuries. Originally, from 1838 until 1861, the 398-square-kilometre (154 sq mi) municipality encompassed roughly the same boundaries as the present-day Vennesla Municipality. The second iteration of the municipality was only 109 square kilometres (42 sq mi) and it corresponded to the central part of present-day Vennesla Municipality. The administrative centre was the village of Skarpengland. The small village of Øvrebø is located about 3 kilometres (1.9 mi) west of Skarpengland, and this is where the Øvrebø Church is located.

Prior to its dissolution in 1964, the 108.98-square-kilometre (42.08 sq mi) municipality was the 501st largest by area out of the 689 municipalities in Norway. Øvrebø Municipality was the 618th most populous municipality in Norway with a population of about 959. The municipality's population density was 8.8 inhabitants per square kilometre (23/sq mi) and its population had increased by 5.3% over the previous 10-year period.

== General information ==
The large parish of Øvrebø was established as a municipality on 1 January 1838 (see formannskapsdistrikt law). It existed as a municipality until 1 January 1861, when it was dissolved and split into two separate municipalities: the southeastern district (population: 1,103) became the new Vennesla Municipality and the rest of the old municipality (population: 1,829) became the new Øvrebø og Hægeland Municipality.

The municipality of Øvrebø was re-established on 1 July 1896 when the old Øvrebø og Hægeland Municipality was divided to create two new municipalities: the southern district (population: 888) became the new Øvrebø Municipality and the northern district (population: 843) became the new Hægeland Municipality.

During the 1960s, there were many municipal mergers across Norway due to the work of the Schei Committee. On 1 January 1964, the Eikeland area (population: 39) of Øvrebø Municipality was transferred to the newly-created Songdalen Municipality to the southwest. On the same date, Øvrebø Municipality was dissolved and its remaining land was merged with the following areas to form a larger Vennesla Municipality:

- most of Øvrebø Municipality (population: 925), except for the Eikeland area
- all of Hægeland Municipality (population: 849)
- all of Vennesla Municipality (population: 7,321)

=== Name ===
The municipality (originally the parish) is named after the old Øvrebø farm (Old Norse: Øfribœr) since the first Øvrebø Church was built there. The first element comes from the word øfri which means "upper". The last element is bœr which means "farm" or "farmstead" (it is cognate with the Dutch language word "boer" which means "farmer"). The name therefore means "the upper farm".

=== Churches ===
The Church of Norway had one parish (sokn) within Øvrebø Municipality. At the time of the municipal dissolution, it was part of the Vennesla prestegjeld and the Otredal prosti (deanery) in the Diocese of Agder.

Churches in Øvrebø Municipality
Parish (sokn)	Church name	Location of the church	Year built
Øvrebø	Øvrebø Church	Øvrebø	1800

== Geography ==
Øvrebø Municipality was located in the Otra river valley, a little west of the river. The highest point in the municipality was the 382-metre (1,253 ft) tall mountain Rystheia. Hægeland Municipality was located to the north, Vennesla Municipality was located to the east, Oddernes Municipality was located to the southeast, Greipstad Municipality was located to the south, Øyslebø Municipality was located to the southwest, and Finsland Municipality was located to the west.

== Government ==
While it existed, Øvrebø Municipality was responsible for primary education (through 10th grade), outpatient health services, senior citizen services, welfare and other social services, zoning, economic development, and municipal roads and utilities. The municipality was governed by a municipal council of directly elected representatives. The mayor was indirectly elected by a vote of the municipal council. The municipality was under the jurisdiction of the Setesdal District Court and the Agder Court of Appeal.

=== Municipal council ===
The municipal council (Heradsstyre) of Øvrebø Municipality was made up of 13 representatives that were elected to four year terms. The tables below show the historical composition of the council by political party.

Øvrebø heradsstyre 1959–1963
Party name (in Nynorsk)	Number of representatives
Labour Party (Arbeidarpartiet)	2
Christian Democratic Party (Kristeleg Folkeparti)	3
Centre Party (Senterpartiet)	6
Liberal Party (Venstre)	2
Total number of members:	13
Note: On 1 January 1964, Øvrebø Municipality became part of Vennesla Municipality.

Øvrebø heradsstyre 1955–1959
Party name (in Nynorsk)	Number of representatives
Labour Party (Arbeidarpartiet)	2
Christian Democratic Party (Kristeleg Folkeparti)	3
Joint List(s) of Non-Socialist Parties (Borgarlege Felleslister)	8
Total number of members:	13

Øvrebø heradsstyre 1951–1955
Party name (in Nynorsk)	Number of representatives
Labour Party (Arbeidarpartiet)	2
Joint List(s) of Non-Socialist Parties (Borgarlege Felleslister)	10
Total number of members:	12

Øvrebø heradsstyre 1947–1951
Party name (in Nynorsk)	Number of representatives
Labour Party (Arbeidarpartiet)	2
Joint List(s) of Non-Socialist Parties (Borgarlege Felleslister)	10
Total number of members:	12

Øvrebø heradsstyre 1945–1947
Party name (in Nynorsk)	Number of representatives
Labour Party (Arbeidarpartiet)	3
Joint List(s) of Non-Socialist Parties (Borgarlege Felleslister)	9
Total number of members:	12

Øvrebø heradsstyre 1937–1941*
Party name (in Nynorsk)	Number of representatives
Labour Party (Arbeidarpartiet)	2
Farmers' Party (Bondepartiet)	6
Liberal Party (Venstre)	4
Total number of members:	12
Note: Due to the German occupation of Norway during World War II, no elections were held for new municipal councils until after the war ended in 1945.

=== Mayors ===
The mayor (Nynorsk: ordførar) of Øvrebø Municipality was the political leader of the municipality and the chairperson of the municipal council. The following people have held this position:

- 1838–1839: Rev. Aksel Christian Pharo
- 1840–1841: H.P. Smith
- 1842–1843: Rev. Aksel Christian Pharo
- 1844–1845: Alf Robstad
- 1846–1849: H.P. Smith
- 1850–1851: Ole A. Egeland
- 1852–1855: H.P. Smith
- 1856–1856: J. Boysen
- 1857–1857: Ole A. Egeland
- 1858–1860: Alf A. Robstad
- (1861–1896: Municipality dissolved)
- 1896–1901: Terje Horrisland
- 1902–1907: Lars O. Røyneland
- 1908–1914: O.G. Homme
- 1914–1916: Lars O. Røyneland
- 1917–1940: O.S. Ilebekk
- 1941–1945: Anders Skarpengland
- 1945–1947: O.S. Ilebekk
- 1948–1955: Torjus Eikeland
- 1956–1959: Anders Skarpengland
- 1960–1963: Tellef Lie

== See also ==
- List of former municipalities of Norway
