= Øvrebø =

Village in Vennesla Municipality, Norway

- Village
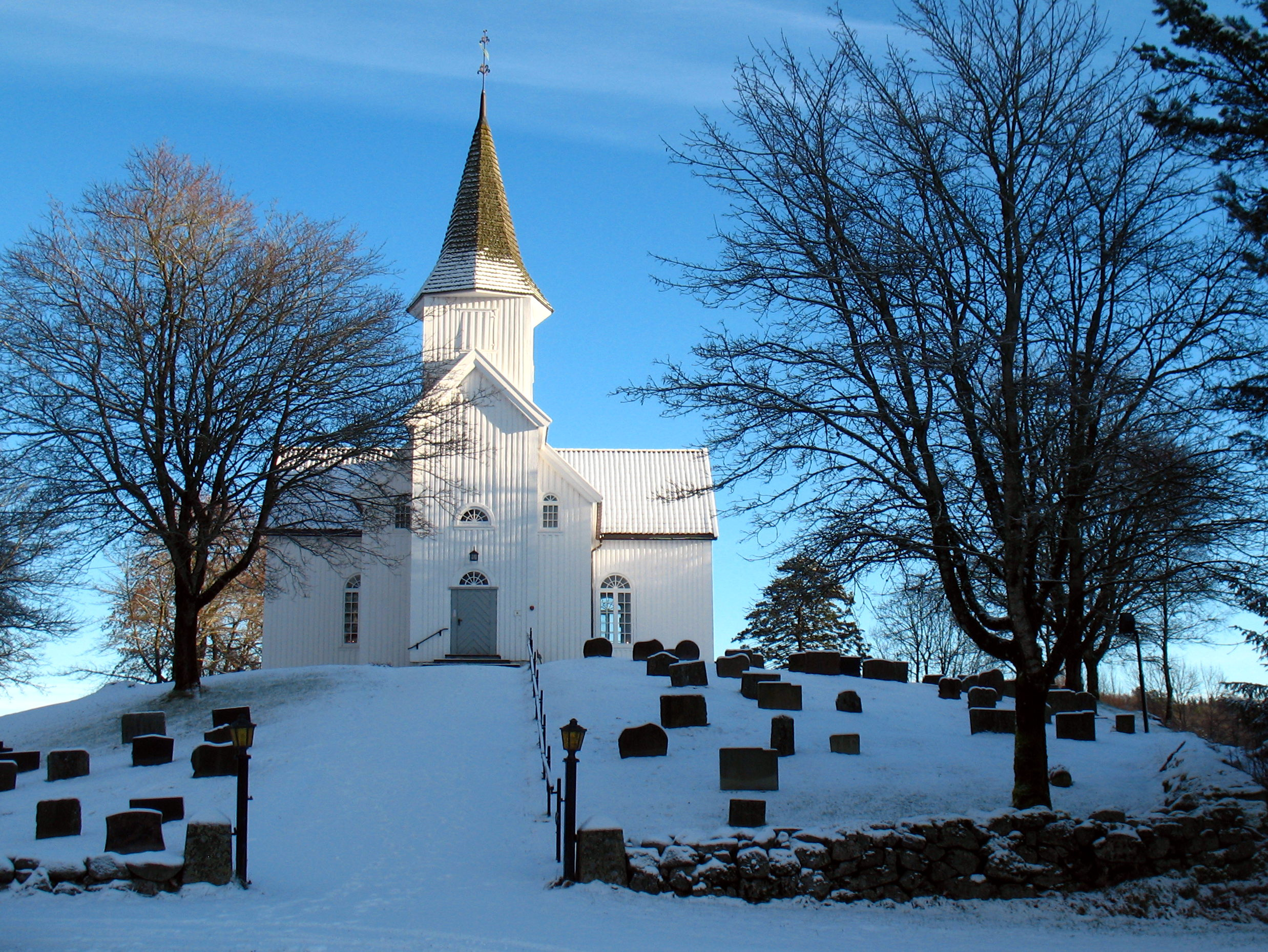
- View of the Øvrebø Church
- Interactive map of Øvrebø
- Coordinates: 58.29147°N 7.77846°E
- Country: Norway
- Region: Southern Norway
- County: Agder
- District: Kristiansand
- Municipality: Vennesla Municipality
- Elevation: 225 m (738 ft)
- Time zone: UTC+01:00 (CET)
  - Summer (DST): UTC+02:00 (CEST)
- Post Code: 4715 Øvrebø

Øvrebø is a village in Vennesla Municipality in Agder county, Norway. The village is located about 25 km (16 mi) north-northwest of the city of Kristiansand. The village of Skarpengland lies about 3 kilometres (1.9 mi) east of the village of Øvrebø.

In nearby Skarpengland, there is a bank, a post office, several stores, a motor repair shop, and a school. Øvrebø is known for the "Øvrebø ski", found at Mushom and considered for many years to be Norway's oldest preserved ski. It can be seen in the Holmenkollen Ski Museum in Oslo. The rural district surrounding the village of Øvrebø is still referred to as Øvrebø. This district covers the central part of Vennesla Municipality.

== History ==
Historically, the whole district of Øvrebø was a separate municipality known as Øvrebø Municipality which existed from 1838 until 1865, and then again from 1896 until 1964. The main church for the municipality, Øvrebø Church, has been located in the village of Øvrebø for centuries and the administrative centre of Øvrebø Municipality was located in nearby Skarpengland.

=== Name ===
The village is named after the old Øvrebø farm (Old Norse: Øfribœr), since the first Øvrebø Church was built there. The first part of the name means "upper" and second part of the name is identical with the word bœr which means "farm" and it is cognate with the Dutch language word "boer" which means "farmer". The name therefore means "the upper farm".

== See also ==
- History of skiing
