= Vennesla (village) =

Village in Vennesla Municipality, Norway

- Village
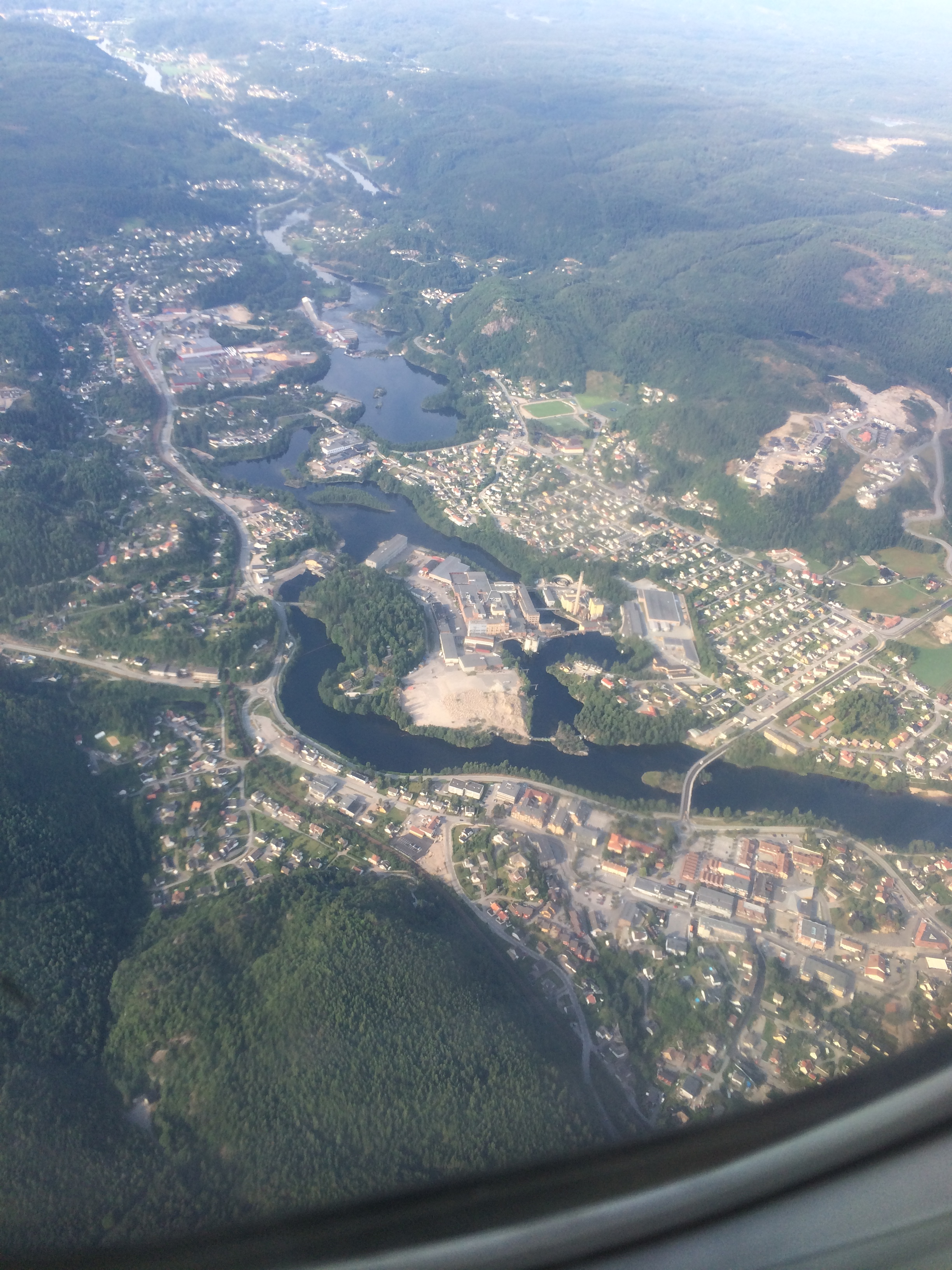
- View of the village
- Interactive map of Vennesla
- Coordinates: 58.26857°N 7.97317°E
- Country: Norway
- Region: Southern Norway
- County: Agder
- District: Kristiansand
- Municipality: Vennesla Municipality

Area
  - Total: 7.5 km^{2} (2.9 sq mi)
- Elevation: 49 m (161 ft)

Population (2025)
  - Total: 14,158
  - Density: 1,888/km^{2} (4,890/sq mi)
- Time zone: UTC+01:00 (CET)
  - Summer (DST): UTC+02:00 (CEST)
- Post Code: 4700 Vennesla

Vennesla is the administrative centre of Vennesla Municipality in Agder county, Norway. The village is located in the upper Torridal valley along the river Otra, about 15 kilometres (9.3 mi) north of the city of Kristiansand. The village itself extends for about 10 kilometres (6.2 mi) along both sides of the river. The Norwegian National Road 9 passes through Mosby, about 6 kilometres (3.7 mi) south of Vennesla. The Sørlandsbanen railway line passes through Vennesla, stopping at Vennesla Station. The lake Venneslafjorden is located on the river Otra (due to a dam on the river) in the northern part of the village of Vennesla.

The village of Vennesla has significant industry, and nearby along the river Otra there are several hydroelectric power plants. The village has considerable government, commercial, and service industries as well as the Vennesla high school which has both general and vocational classes. Vennesla Church is located in the village, serving as the main church for the municipality. The Vennesla Library and Culture House was completed in 2011. The football club of Vennesla is Vindbjart FK, founded in 1896. Vindbjart plays in the Norwegian Second Division at a Moseidmoen stadium in Vennesla.

Statistics Norway includes the 1.32-square-kilometre (330-acre) village of Mosby in neighboring Kristiansand Municipality as part of the whole 7.25-square-kilometre (1,790-acre) urban area of Vennesla. The whole urban area has a population (2025) of 14,158 which includes 2,504 people who live in Mosby. This gives the whole urban area a population density of 1,888 inhabitants per square kilometre (4,890/sq mi).

== Town status ==
The "village" of Vennesla has 14,158 residents in 2025 which makes it one of the largest urban areas in the county, and it is much larger than many towns in Southern Norway. There has been political talk of granting town status to Vennesla, but there was little support, so politicians have not pursued the cause.
