= Hægeland Church =

Church in Agder, Norway

- Hægeland kirke
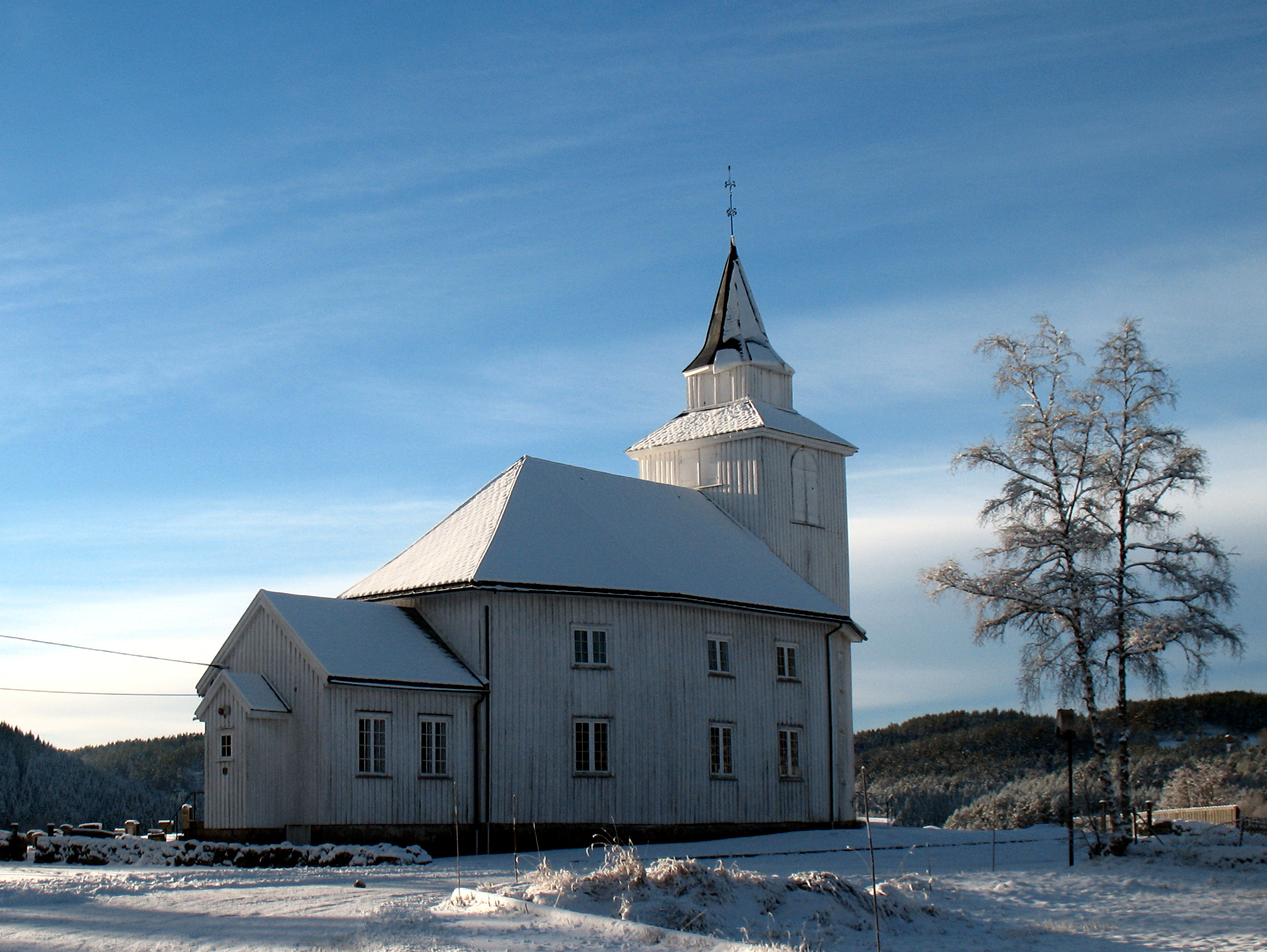
- View of the church
- Hægeland Church
- 58.3863307°N 07.7403657°E
- Location: Vennesla Municipality, Agder
- Country: Norway
- Denomination: Church of Norway
- Previous denomination: Catholic Church
- Churchmanship: Evangelical Lutheran

History
- Status: Parish church
- Founded: 14th century
- Consecrated: 12 Dec 1830

Architecture
- Functional status: Active
- Architect: Anders Thorsen Syrtveit
- Architectural type: Octagonal
- Completed: 1830 (196 years ago)

Specifications
- Capacity: 250
- Materials: Wood

Administration
- Diocese: Agder og Telemark
- Deanery: Otredal prosti
- Parish: Hægeland
- Norwegian Cultural Heritage Site
- Type: Church
- Status: Automatically protected
- ID: 84688

Hægeland Church (Norwegian: Hægeland kirke) is a parish church of the Church of Norway in Vennesla Municipality in Agder county, Norway. It is located in the village of Hægeland. It is the church for the Hægeland parish which is part of the Otredal prosti (deanery) in the Diocese of Agder og Telemark. The white, wooden church was built in a octagonal design in 1830 using plans drawn up by the architect Anders Thorsen Syrtveit. The church seats about 250 people.

== History ==
The earliest existing historical records of the church date back to the year 1565, but there is some indirect evidence that the medieval church existed as far back as during the late-1300s. The old church underwent some extensive renovations in 1677 and again in 1713–1716. It was said to be a long church about 8.5 metres (28 ft) long and 7 metres (23 ft) wide. A stone wall was built around the cemetery in 1790. The old church was in poor condition and in 1824, discussions began about replacing the old church. In 1826, it was decided that they would build an octagonal church. In 1828, the nearby Hornnes Church was completed and it was used as a model for planning for a new church in Hægeland. The same builder/architect, Anders Thorsen Syrtveit was hired to complete the new church. The old church was torn down in May 1829 and a new church was built in 1830 on the same site, reusing some of the old timbers in the new building. The sacristy was the last part of the building to be completed and they could not consecrate the church until it was all finished. The bishop refused to travel to Hægeland in the late autumn for the consecration of the new building, so the church was consecrated by the pastor on 12 December 1830.

== Media gallery ==
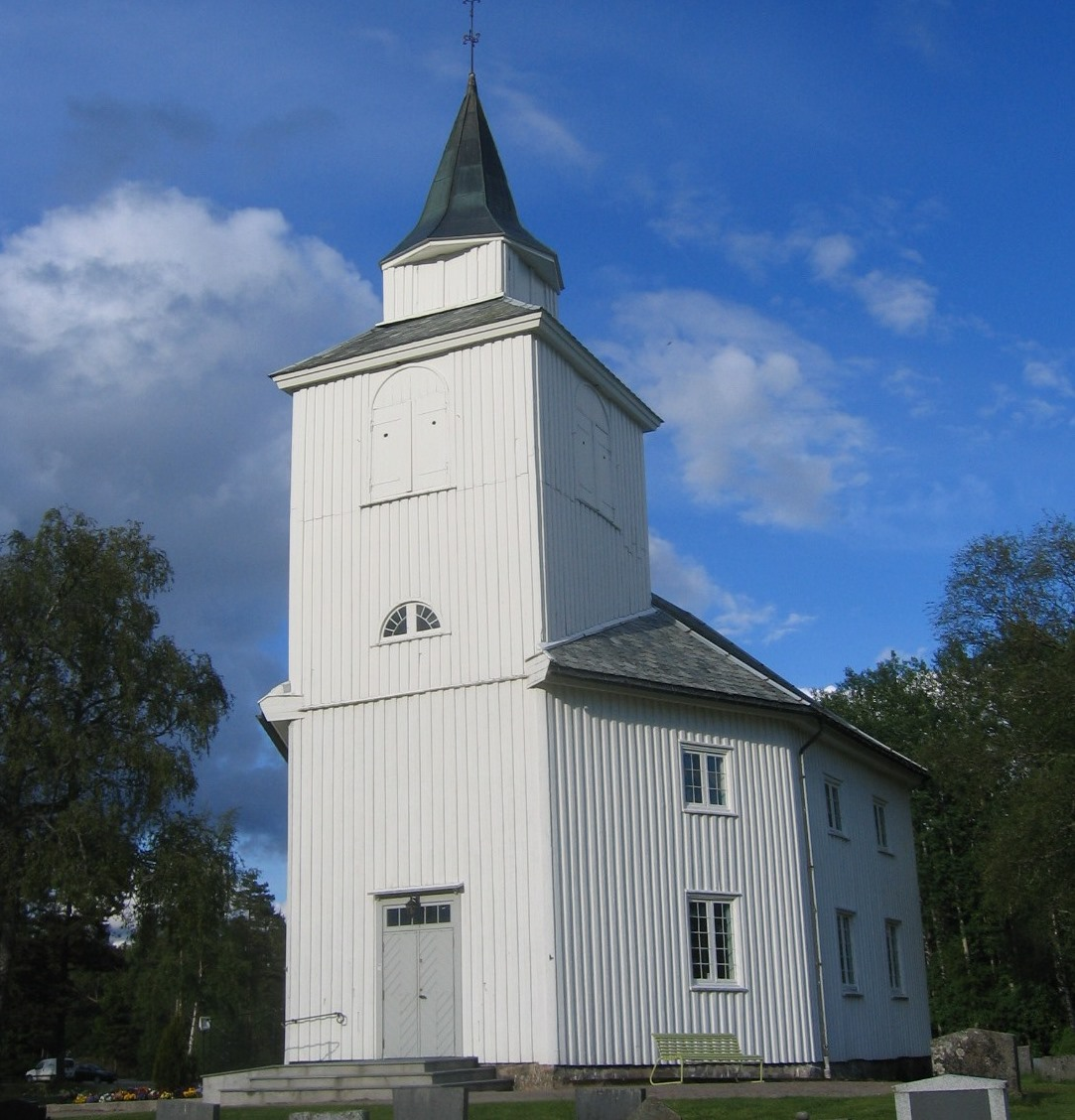
View of the church front

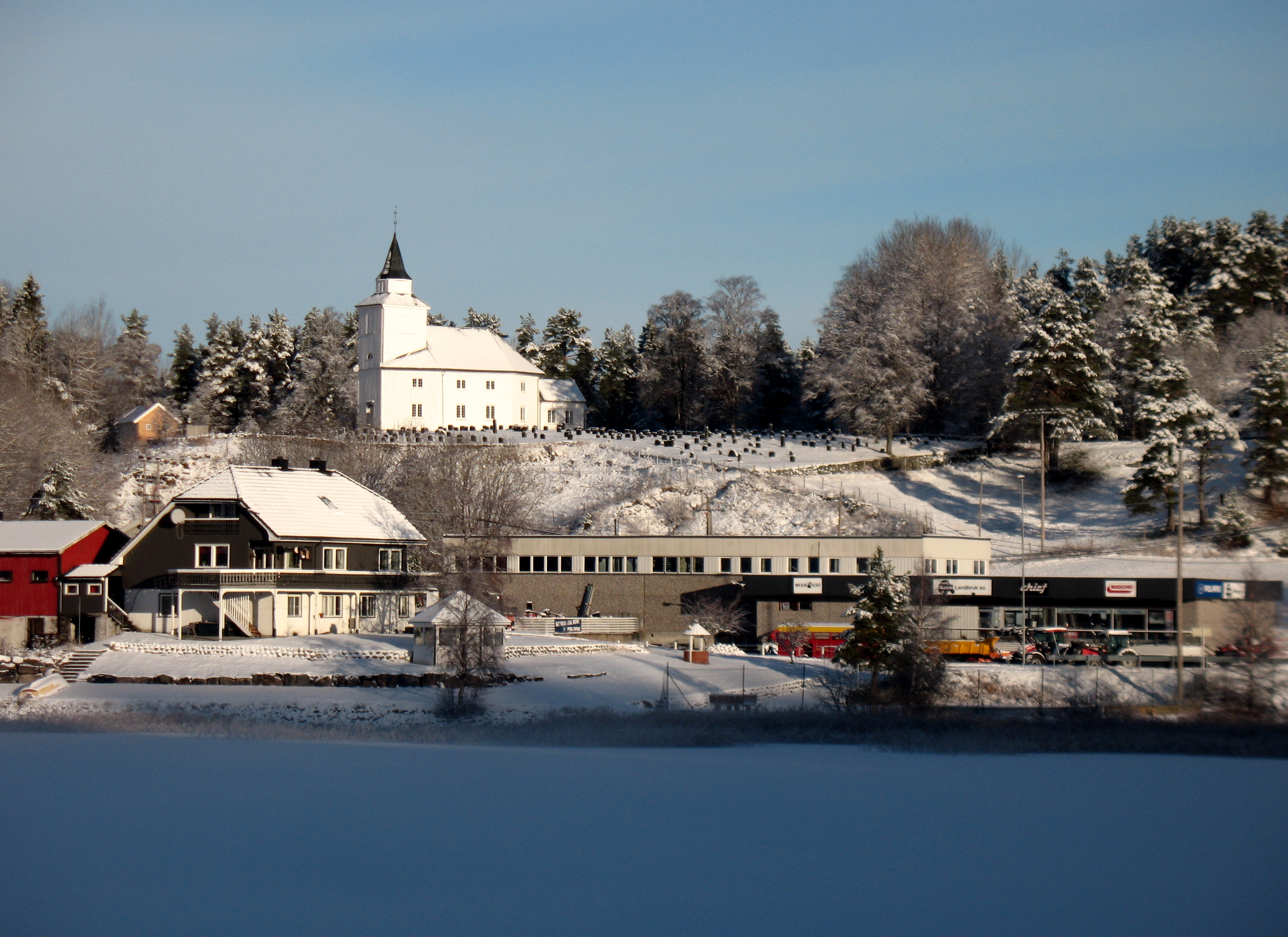
View of the church in the village

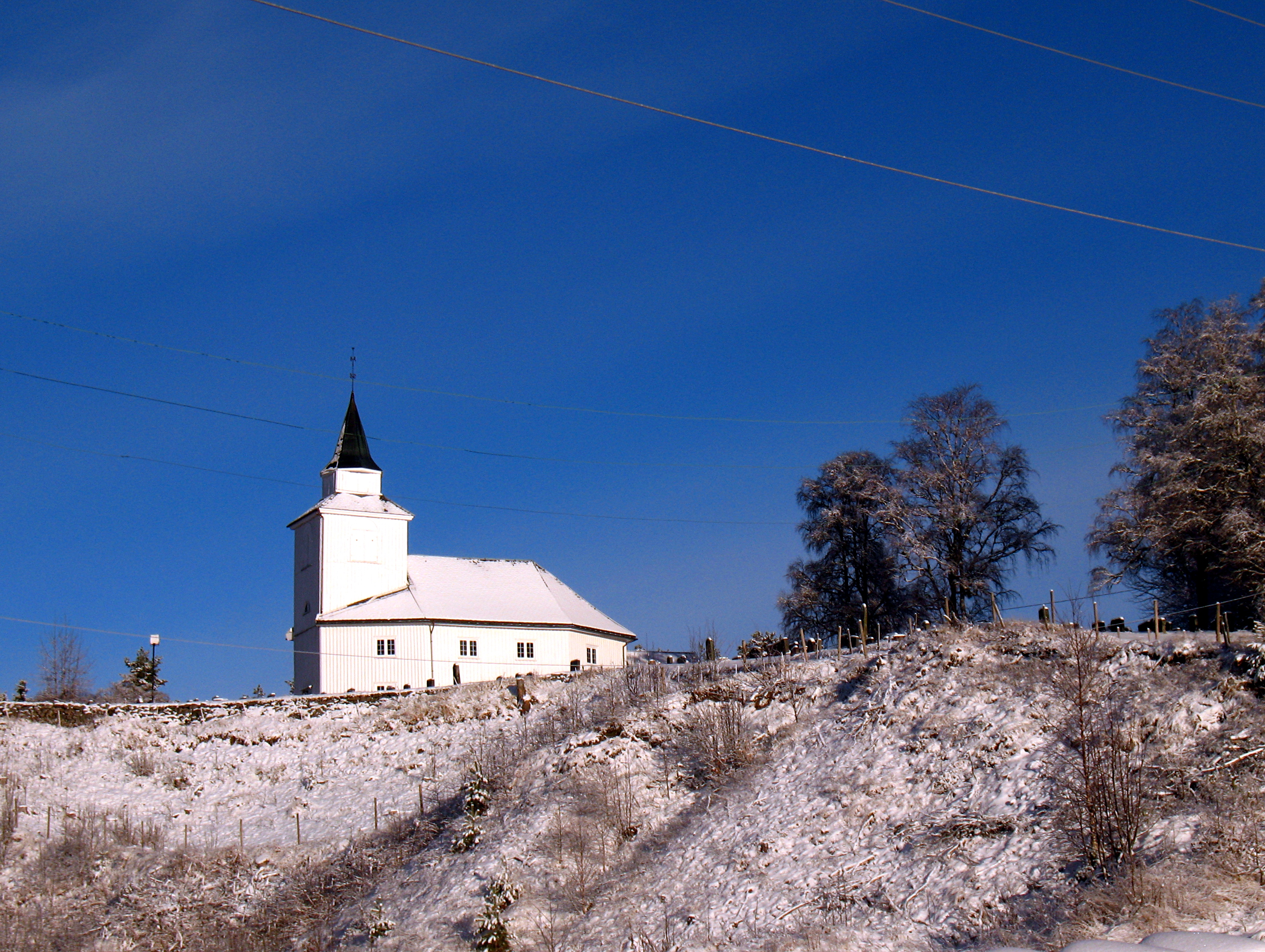
Side view of the church

== See also ==
- List of churches in Agder og Telemark
