= Øvrebø Church =

Church in Agder, Norway

- Øvrebø kirke
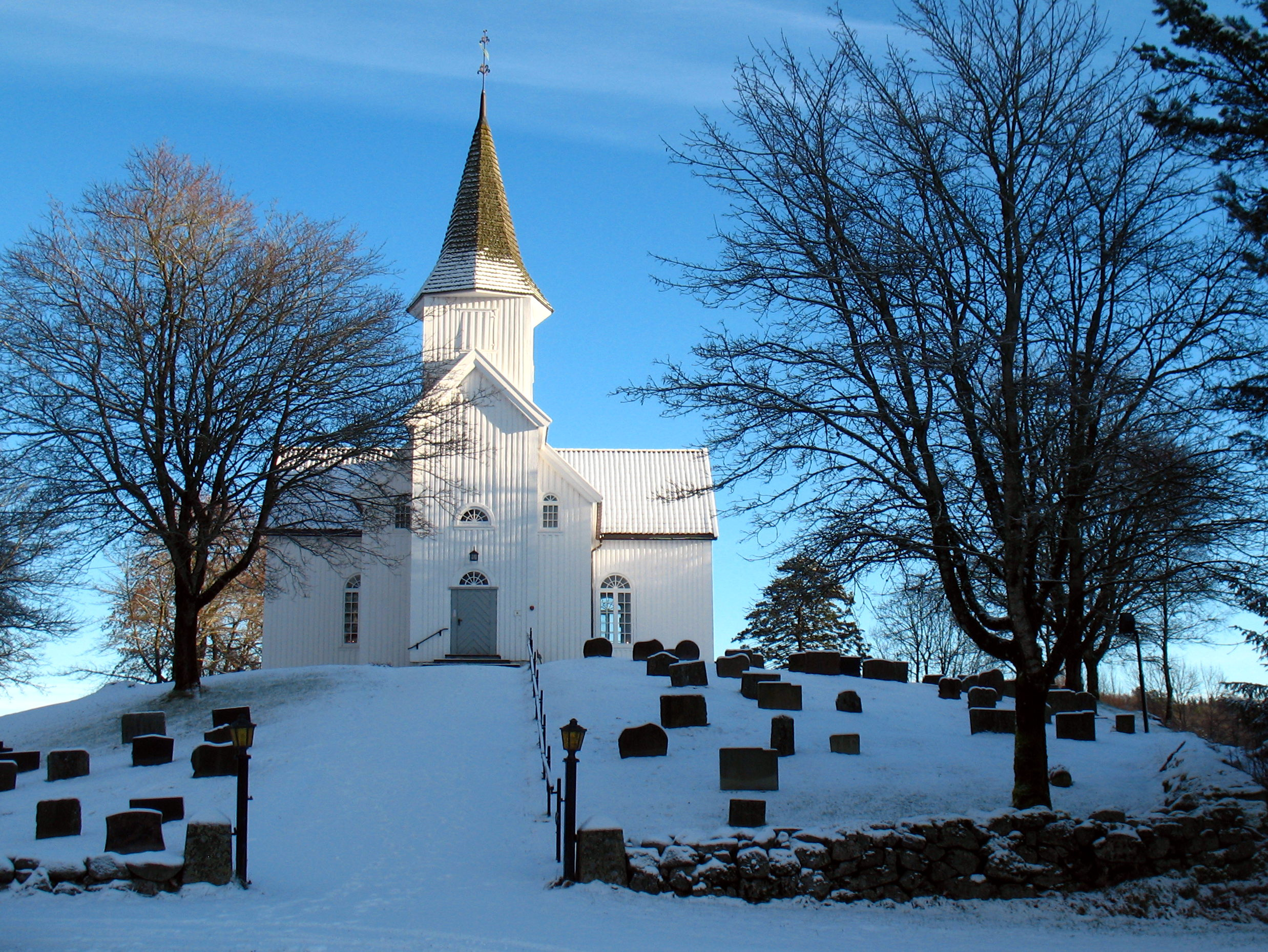
- View of the church
- Øvrebø Church
- 58.29335°N 07.789516°E
- Location: Vennesla Municipality, Agder
- Country: Norway
- Denomination: Church of Norway
- Previous denomination: Catholic Church
- Churchmanship: Evangelical Lutheran

History
- Status: Parish church
- Founded: Middle Ages
- Consecrated: 1800

Architecture
- Functional status: Active
- Architectural type: Cruciform
- Completed: 1800 (226 years ago)

Specifications
- Capacity: 300
- Materials: Wood

Administration
- Diocese: Agder og Telemark
- Deanery: Otredal prosti
- Parish: Øvrebø
- Norwegian Cultural Heritage Site
- Type: Church
- Status: Automatically protected
- ID: 85932

Øvrebø Church (Norwegian: Øvrebø kirke) is a parish church of the Church of Norway in Vennesla Municipality in Agder county, Norway. It is located in the village of Øvrebø, a short distance west of the village of Skarpengland. It is the church for the Øvrebø parish which is part of the Otredal prosti (deanery) in the Diocese of Agder og Telemark. The white, wooden church was built in a cruciform design in 1800 using plans drawn up an unknown architect. The church seats about 300 people.

== History ==
The earliest existing historical records of the church date to the year 1620, but the church was quite old at that time. In 1640, the old church building was tarred on the exterior walls. In 1660, the church was extensively repaired as well. In 1768 and 1789, the church was reported to be in fair condition, but in 1797 it was no longer in good shape. It was found that the walls and floors had extensive rot in them, endangering the structure, plus the church had become too small for the congregation. In the autumn of 1798, work began on a new church, in the summer of 1799 it was reported that the old church had been demolished and a new one under construction. This new timber-framed, cruciform church was completed on the same site in 1800 and it was consecrated in 1800.

In 1814, this church served as an election church (Norwegian: valgkirke). Together with more than 300 other parish churches across Norway, it was a polling station for elections to the 1814 Norwegian Constituent Assembly which wrote the Constitution of Norway. This was Norway's first national elections. Each church parish was a constituency that elected people called "electors" who later met together in each county to elect the representatives for the assembly that was to meet at Eidsvoll Manor later that year.

== Media gallery ==
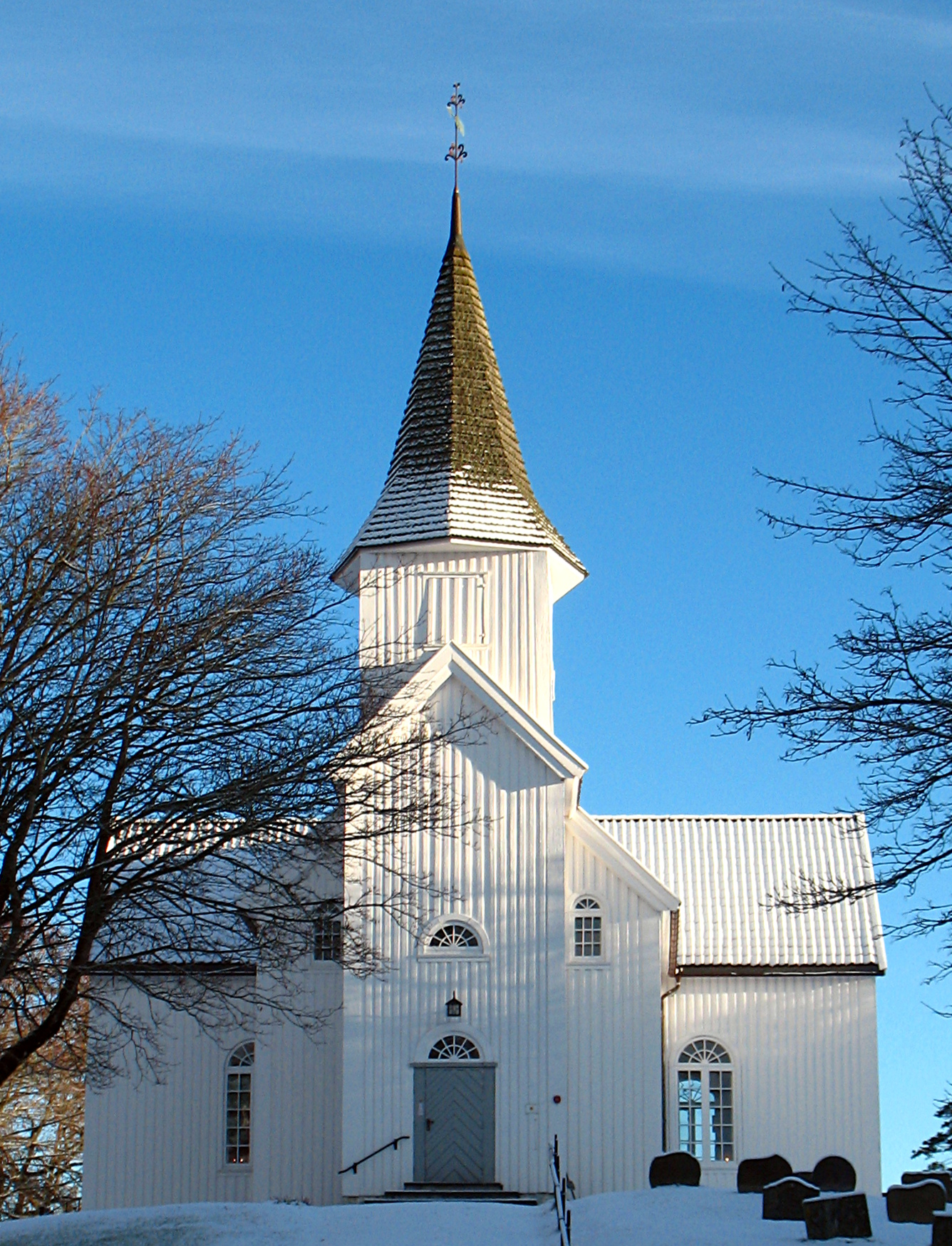

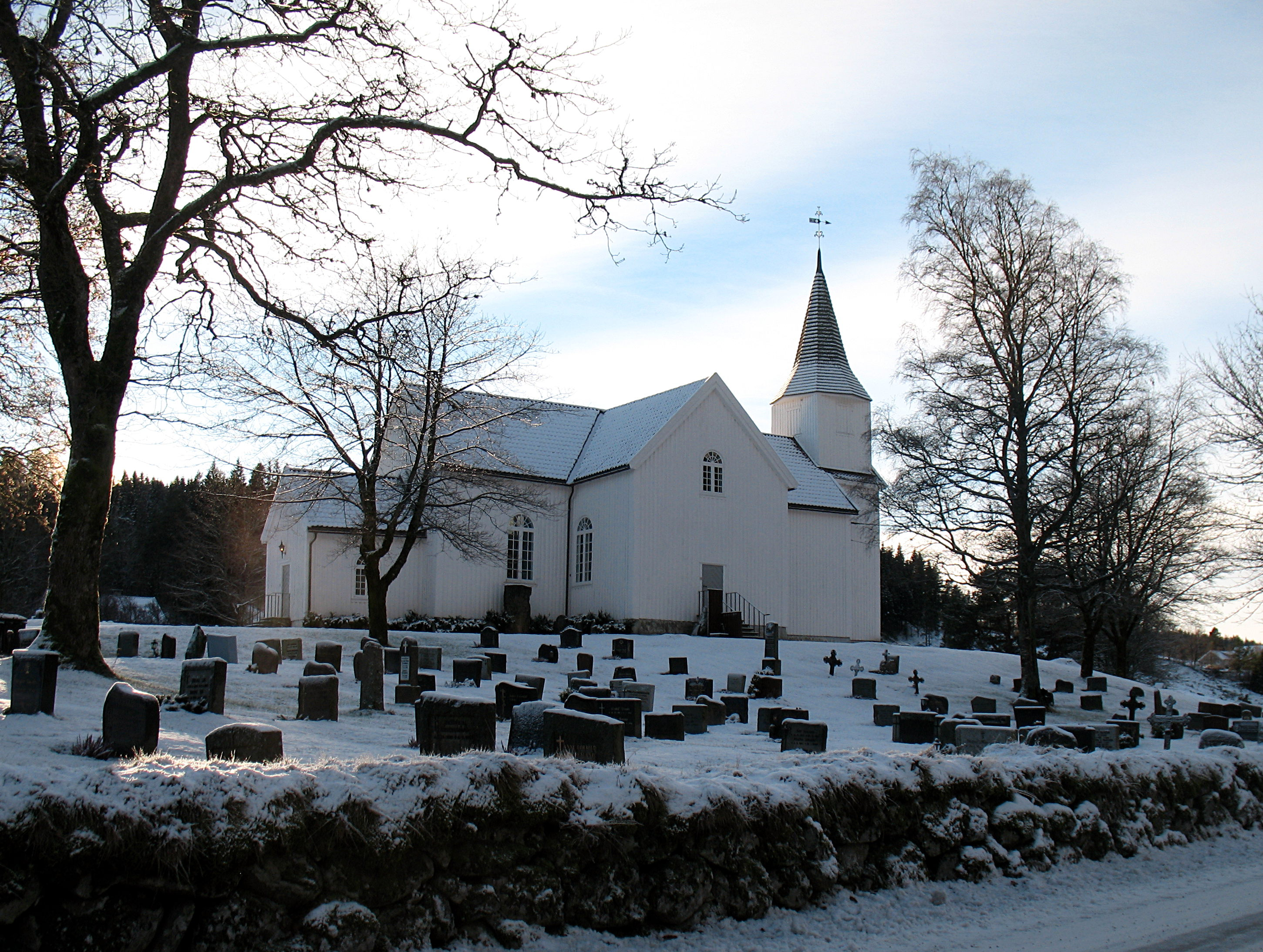

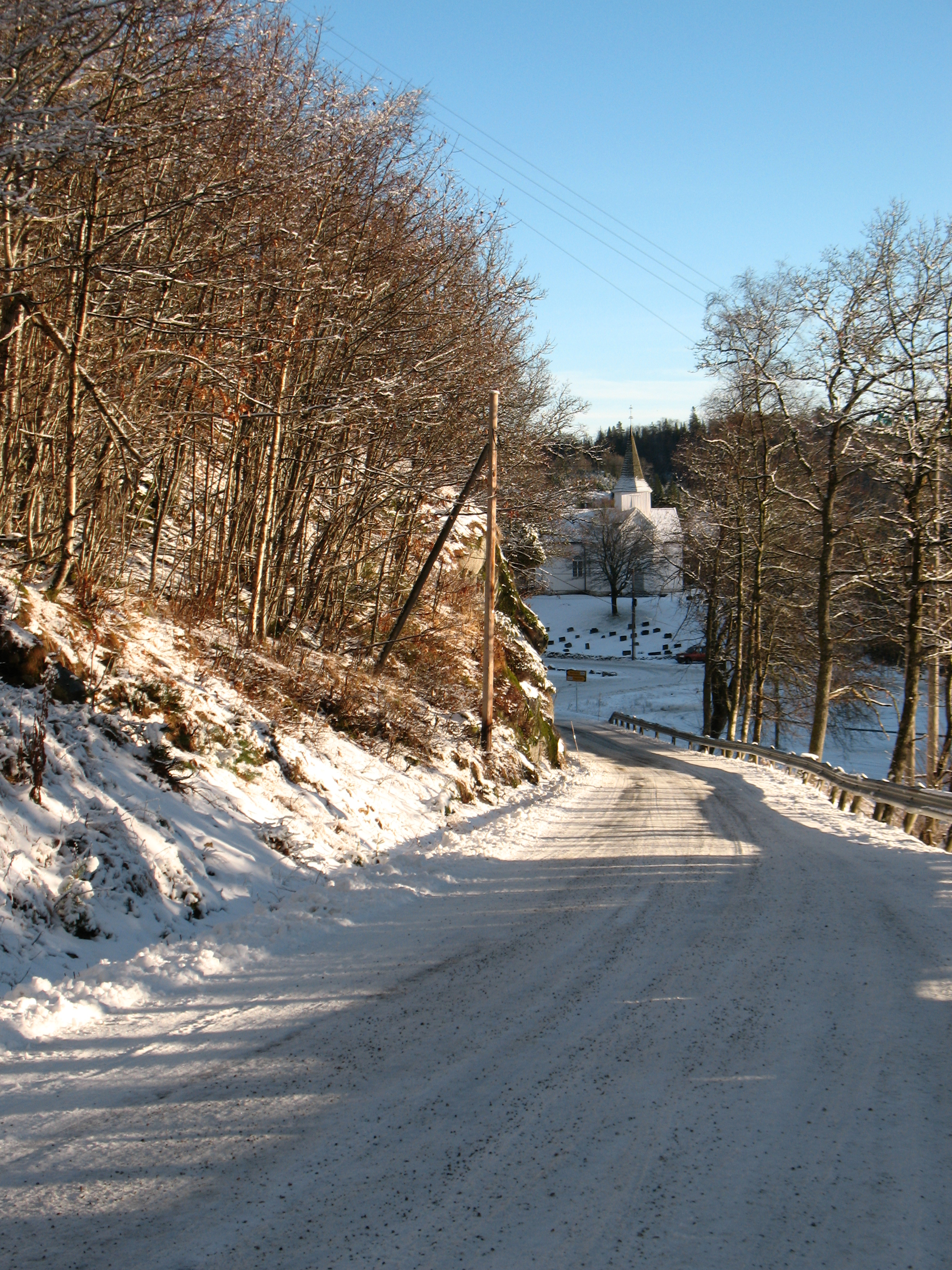

== See also ==
- List of churches in Agder og Telemark
