= Kristiansand Region =

Metro region in Southern Norway

Kristiansand Region Kristiansandsregionen
- Metropolitan Region (Metro)
- Kristiansandregionen marked in green in the far southern tip of Norway
- Coordinates: 58.6°N 7.8°E
- Country: Norway
- County (fylke): Agder
- Urban centre: Kristiansand

Area
  - Total: 3,051.96 km^{2} (1,178.37 sq mi)

Population (2026)
  - Total: 177,416
  - Density: 58.1318/km^{2} (150.561/sq mi)
- Website: www.rkrs.no

Kristiansand Region (Norwegian: Kristiansandregionen) is a statistical metropolitan region in Agder county in southern Norway. It is centered on the city of Kristiansand. The region consist of six municipalities in the centre of Southern Norway. Vennesla Municipality, Iveland Municipality, and Birkenes Municipality are inland municipalities while Kristiansand Municipality, Lindesnes Municipality, and Lillesand Municipality are coastal municipalities. Kristiansand Municipality is the largest municipality in population in the region.

== Municipalities ==
The following municipalities are part of this region:

Nr	Municipality	Map	Coat of arms	Adm. center	Population (2026)	Area km^{2}	Language
4204	Kristiansand Municipality	Kristiansand kommune	Kristiansand kommune	Kristiansand	119,287	644.63	Bokmål
4205	Lindesnes Municipality	Lindesnes kommune	Lindesnes kommune	Mandal	23,702	933.56	Bokmål
4215	Lillesand Municipality	Lillesand kommune	Lillesand kommune	Lillesand	11,822	190.31	Bokmål
4216	Birkenes Municipality	Birkenes kommune	Birkenes kommune	Birkeland	5,447	637.35	Neutral
4218	Iveland Municipality	Iveland kommune	Iveland kommune	Birketveit	1,386	261.63	Neutral
4223	Vennesla Municipality	Vennesla kommune	Vennesla kommune	Vennesla	15,772	384.48	Neutral

== Geography ==
The Kristiansand region lies along the southern coast of Norway, centered around the city of Kristiansand. The region borders the Lister Region to the west, the region of Setesdal to the northwest (with Evje as its urban centre), and Østre Agder to the northeast (with Arendal as its urban centre).

=== Urban areas ===
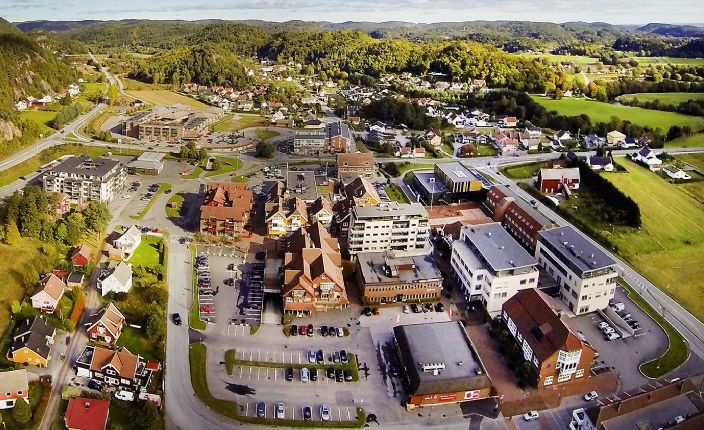
Tangvall, the administrative centre in Søgne

The city of Kristiansand is the main urban area for the Kristiansand region, with a population of about 67,920. The borough Kvadraturen is the city downtown centrum and administrative centre for Kristiansand municipality. The borough has a population of 5,750 and is the least populated borough in Kristiansand. Agder County's government building is also located in Kristiansand.

Other larger urban areas in the region include the village of Vennesla which is the administrative centre of Vennesla Municipality, and it has a population of 14,158. Tangvall (also referred to as Søgne) is in Kristiansand Municipality, right next to the European route E39 highway, and it has 11,442 residents. Lillesand Municipality's administrative centre is the town of Lillesand which has a population of about 8,538. Birkeland, the administrative centre of Birkenes Municipality, has a population of 3,015.

=== Cities and towns ===
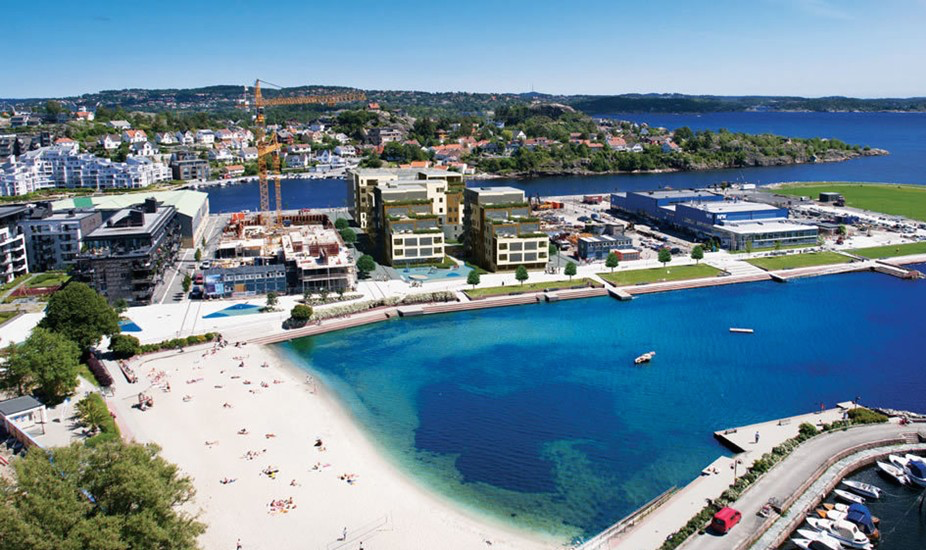
Kristiansand

Cities and towns in Norway are designated with this special status by the government. City status in Norway has no special benefits anymore, but historically it did. Cities and towns in Norway are called byer. Other urban areas without that status are called tettsteder which roughly translates as urban village in English. Kristiansand and Lillesand are the only cities/towns in the region.

=== Villages and suburbs ===
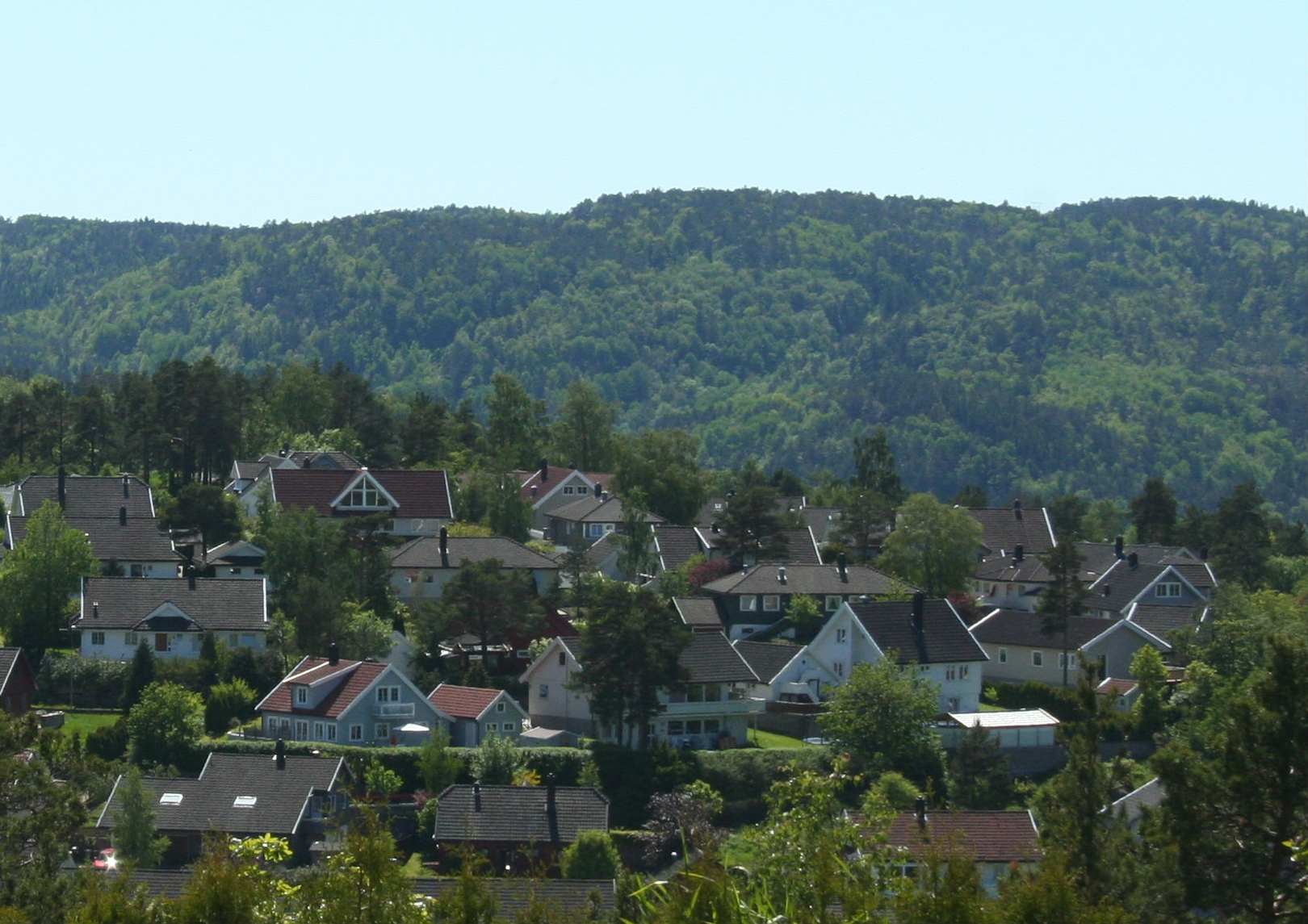
Nodelandsheia in Songdalen

Some of the larger villages and suburban areas in the region include Hægeland and Skarpengland in Vennesla; Finsland, Brennåsen, Volleberg, and Nodeland, Vedderheia, Høllen, Åros, and Langenes in Kristiansand; and Engesland, Herefoss, Oggevatn, and Vegusdal in Birkenes. Lillesand has the village areas of Kroksteinåsen, Borkedalen, and Møglestu.

Kristiansand municipality also has some large suburban areas in some part-boroughs of the boroughs, like in Vågsbygd has larger suburban areas like Voiebyen, Slettheitoppen in Slettheia, Åsane and the island Flekkerøy. Grim has one large suburban area: Hellemyr. Mosby and Strai is smaller suburbs farer away from the city. At Lund, Gimlekollen and Justvik is the larger suburban areas while Gimlevang, Sødal, Hamreheia and Kuholmen is smaller suburbs in the Lund borough. And in Oddernes is Hånes, Søm and Hamresanden, Brattvollshei at Tveit, Tømmerstø, Dvergsnes, Odderhei and Holte at Randesund.

== Transportation ==
=== Airports ===
The only publicly open airport in the region is Kristiansand Airport, Kjevik, it had about 1 million travelers in 2014.

=== Railroads ===
There are three open train stations in the region; Kristiansand Station, Vennesla Station, and Nodeland Station which all operate on the Sørlandsbanen railway. Nodeland Station gets trains from Stavanger Station to Kristiansand which at selective hours continues to Oslo Central Station. Vennesla Station gets train traffic from Oslo to Kristiansand which at selective hours continues to Stavanger.

=== Roads ===
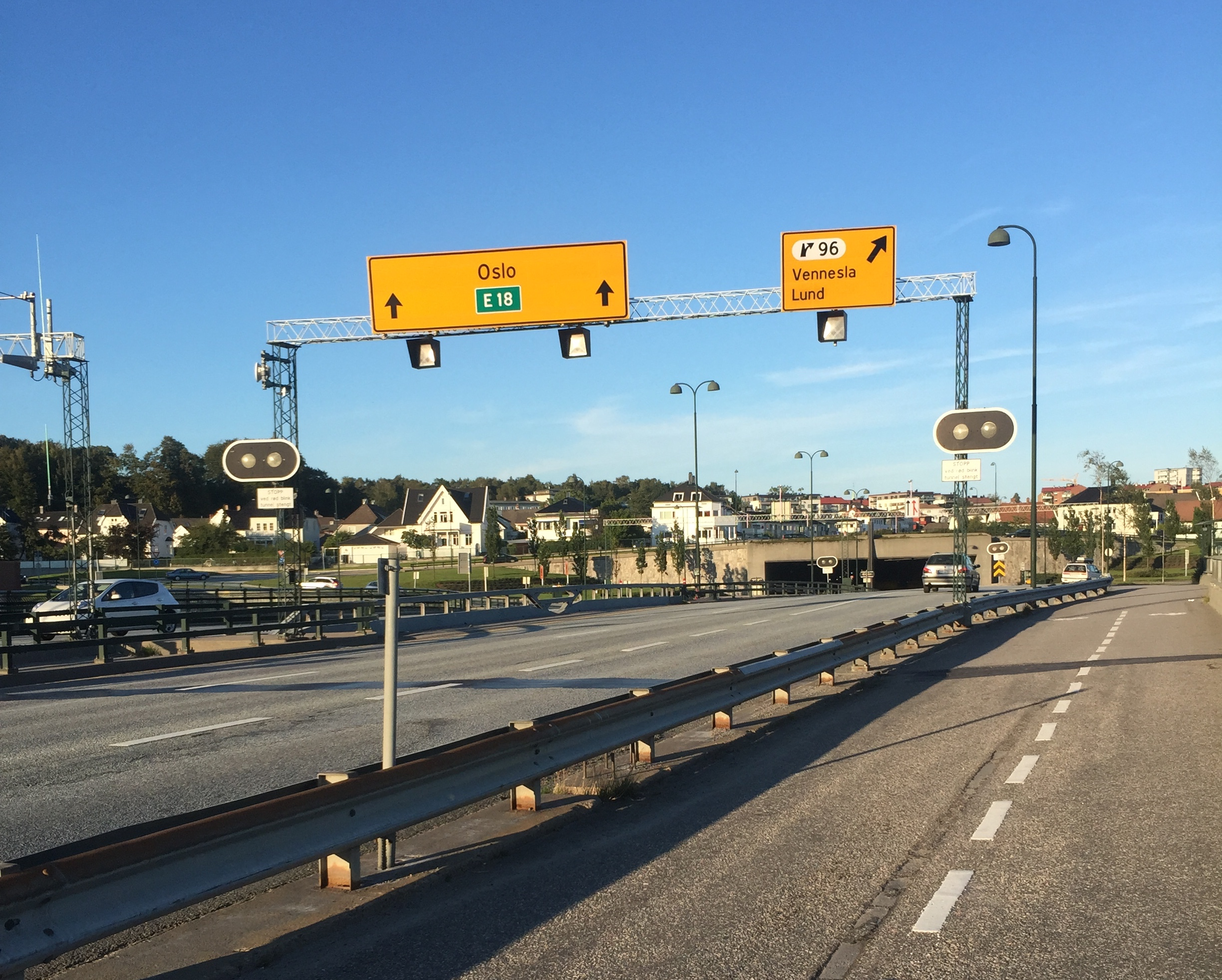
E18 in Kristiansand with the exit to Vennesla

The European route E18 highway is the main road for eastern Kristiansand and Lillesand, it is highway from Kristiansand, through Lillesand towards Arendal. It has four lanes to Grimstad and two lanes from Grimstad to Arendal. E18 continues through Agder and on to Oslo. The European route E39 highway is the main road for western Kristiansand, lower Songdalen, and Søgne. It is highway from downtown Kristiansand to Hellemyr, and from Brennåsen in Songdalen, to Tangvall in Søgne. E39 continues through Agder and on to Stavanger.

Norwegian National Road 9 is a national road from downtown Kristiansand through Vennesla municipality and the villages of Øvrebø and Hægeland. The road continues north to Evje and the Setesdalen valley. Norwegian National Road 41 is a national road from Timeneskrysset in Kristiansand through Tveit and on through the municipality Birkenes.

Norwegian County Road 461 is the main road from E39 to Nodeland and through Songdalen municipality. Norwegian County Road 405 is the main road from R9 to the town Vennesla. Norwegian County Road 454 is the main road from R9 to Øvrebø. Norwegian National Road 456 is the main road from E39 through Tangvall and Langenes in Søgne, it continues through the borough of Vågsbygd and ends with a highway tunnel from Vågsbygd to Hannevika where it meets E39 again. Norwegian County Road 402 goes from E18 in Lillesand to Birkeland.

== Education ==
In the region, there are high schools in Kristiansand, Lillesand, Søgne, Vennesla, and Øvrebø. In Kristiansand, there is also a cathedral high school. The University of Agder is located in Kristiansand. There are also folk high schools such as the Agder Folkehøgskole in Søgne and NLA Mediehøgskolen Gimlekollen in Kristiansand.

== See also ==
- Metropolitan Regions of Norway
