= Songdalen Municipality =

Former municipality in Vest-Agder, Norway

Songdalen Municipality Songdalen kommune
- Former municipality
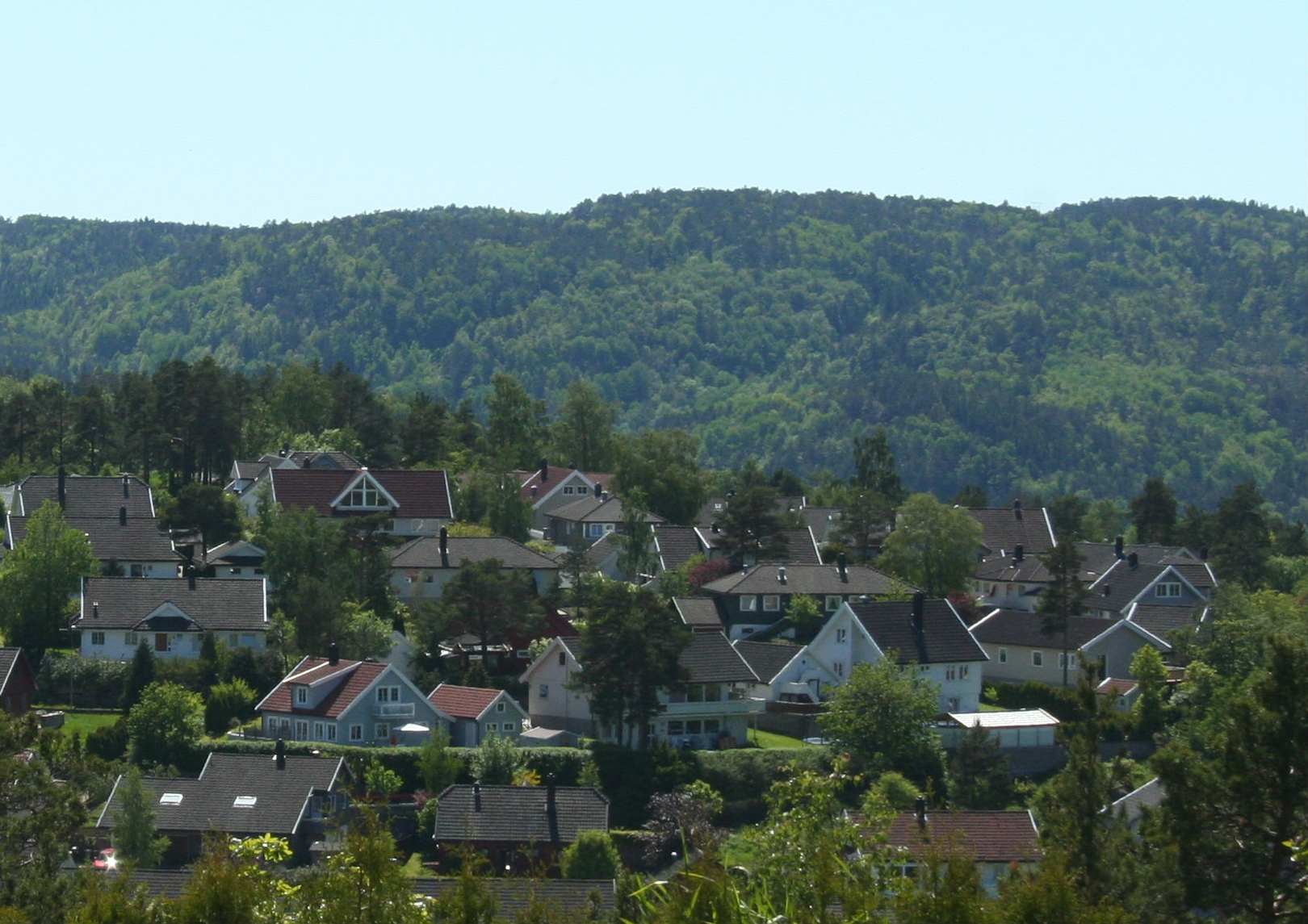
- View of the Nodelandsheia area in Songdalen

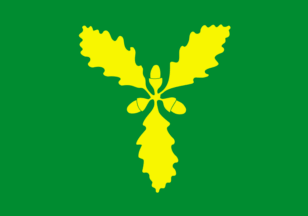
- Flag Coat of arms

- Vest-Agder within Norway

- Songdalen within Vest-Agder
- Coordinates: 58°11′19″N 07°48′06″E
- Country: Norway
- County: Vest-Agder
- District: Sørlandet
- Established: 1 Jan 1964
  - Preceded by: Greipstad Municipality and Finsland Municipality
- Disestablished: 1 Jan 2020
  - Succeeded by: Kristiansand Municipality
- Administrative centre: Nodeland

Government
  - Mayor (2003–2019): Johnny Greibesland (Sp)

Area (upon dissolution)
  - Total: 215.85 km^{2} (83.34 sq mi)
  - Land: 206.22 km^{2} (79.62 sq mi)
  - Water: 9.63 km^{2} (3.72 sq mi) 4.5%
  - Rank: #323 in Norway
- Highest elevation: 413.76 m (1,357.5 ft)

Population (2019)
  - Total: 6,706
  - Rank: #158 in Norway
  - Density: 32.5/km^{2} (84/sq mi)
  - Change (10 years): ▲ +15.5%
- Demonym: Songdøl

Official language
  - Norwegian form: Neutral
- Time zone: UTC+01:00 (CET)
  - Summer (DST): UTC+02:00 (CEST)
- ISO 3166 code: NO-1017

Songdalen is a former municipality in the old Vest-Agder county, Norway. The 216-square-kilometre (83 sq mi) municipality existed from 1964 until its dissolution in 2020. The area is now part of Kristiansand Municipality in Agder county. The administrative centre was the village of Nodeland. Other villages in the municipality included Brennåsen, Finsland, Kilen, Nodelandsheia, and Volleberg. The Sørlandsbanen railway line ran through the municipality, stopping at Nodeland Station. The European route E39 highway also ran through the southern part of the municipality.

Prior to its dissolution in 2020, the 215.85-square-kilometre (83.34 sq mi) municipality was the 323rd largest by area out of the 422 municipalities in Norway. Songdalen Municipality was the 158th most populous municipality in Norway with a population of about 6,706. The municipality's population density was 32.5 inhabitants per square kilometre (84/sq mi) and its population had increased by 15.5% over the previous 10-year period.

== General information ==
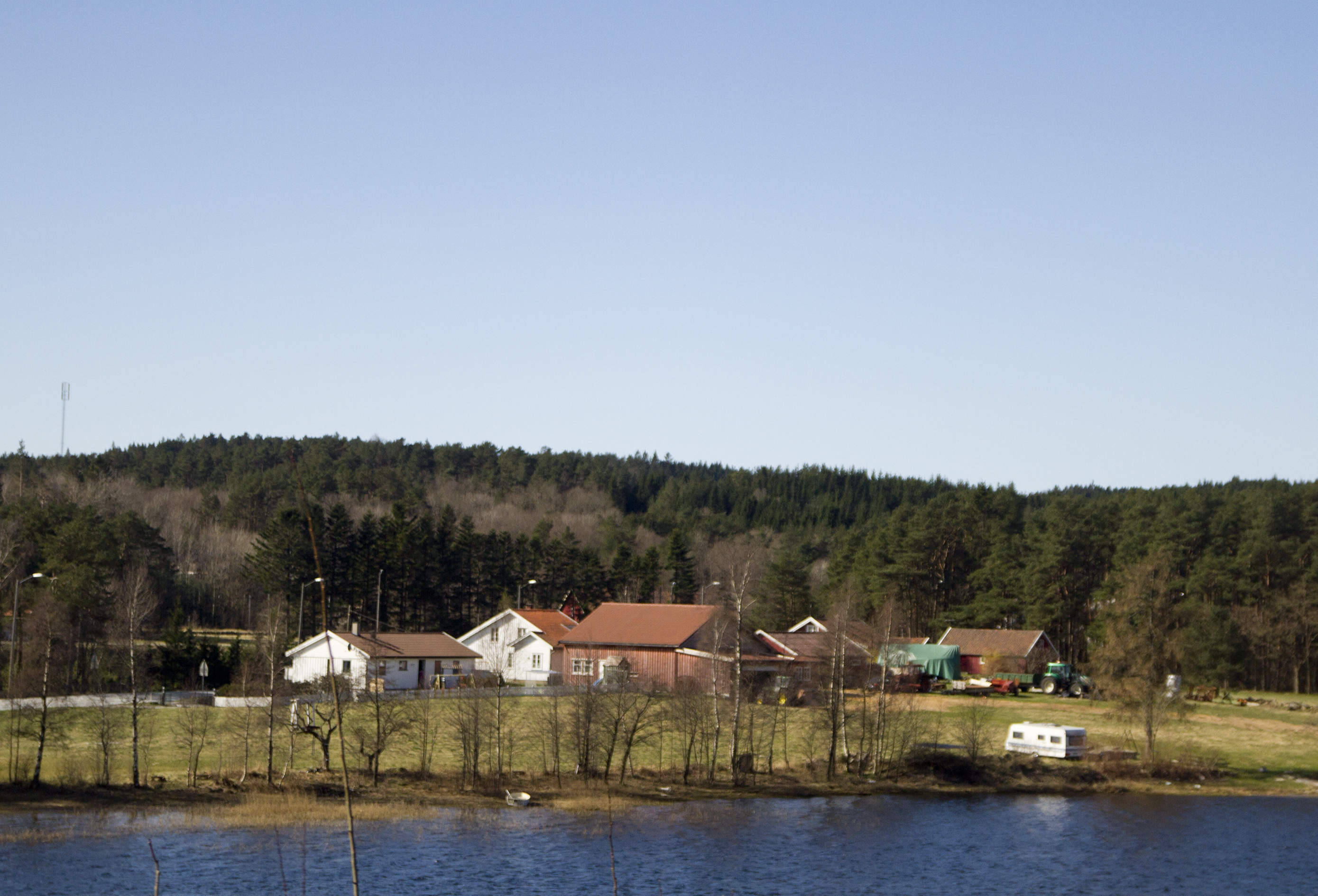
View of the Møllebakke area in Songdalen

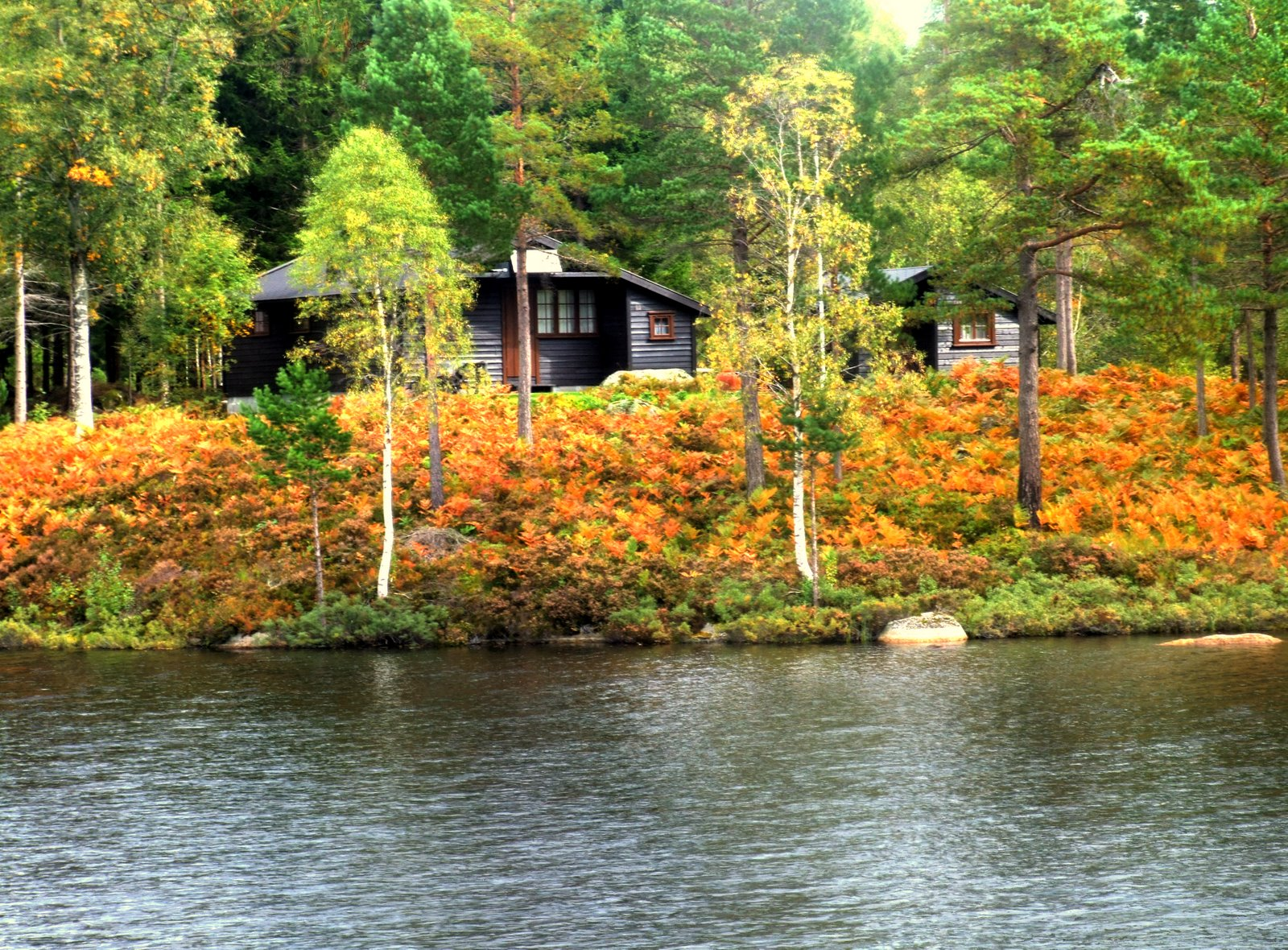
View of the Finsland area

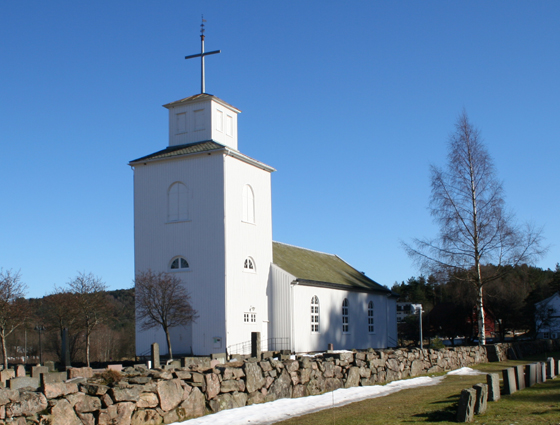
View of the Greipstad Church

=== Administrative history ===
During the 1960s, there were many municipal mergers across Norway due to the work of the Schei Committee. On 1 January 1964, Songdalen Municipality was established when the following areas were merged:

- all of Greipstad Municipality (population: 2,061)
- the Eikeland area of Øvrebø Municipality (population: 39)
- most of Finsland Municipality (population: 797), except for the Kleveland bru area which became part of Marnardal Municipality

On 1 January 1978, a small area of Vennesla Municipality (population: 10) was transferred to Songdalen Municipality. Then on 1 January 1984, an unpopulated area along the lake Hauglandsvatnet was transferred from Vennesla Municipality to Songdalen Municipality. On 15 May 2019, the 0.7-square-kilometre (0.27 sq mi) Åsan farm (population: 4) was transferred from Marnardal Municipality to Songdalen Municipality.

In 2020, there were many municipal and county mergers across Norway due to the work of the Solberg cabinet. On 1 January 2020, Søgne Municipality was dissolved and the following areas were merged to form an enlarged Kristiansand Municipality:

- all of Songdalen Municipality (population: 6,706)
- all of Kristiansand Municipality (population: 92,282)
- all of Søgne Municipality (population: 11,403)

=== Name ===
The municipal name is relatively new, having been created in 1964. The name comes from the local river Songdalselva (Old Norse: Sygna). The lower part of this river is also known as the Søgneelva. The first element of the name comes from the Old Norse name for the river. The river name is derived from the verb súga which means "to suck". The last element is dalr which means "valley" or "dale".

=== Coat of arms ===
The coat of arms was granted on 20 December 1985 and they were in use until the municipality was dissolved on 1 January 2020. The official blazon is "Vert, three oak leaves in pall and three acorns in pall inverted stems conjoined Or" (Norwegian: I grønt tre gull eikeblad i trepass med eikenøtter mellom). This means the arms have a green field (background) and the charge is three conjoined oak leaves with three acorns. The charge has a tincture of Or which means it is commonly colored yellow, but if it is made out of metal, then gold is used. The green color in the field and the oak leaf and acorn design symbolize the importance of the abundant oak forests in the municipality. There are three leaves/acorns to represent each of the three former municipalities of Greipstad, Finsland, and Øvrebø which were merged to form Songdalen Municipality in 1964. The arms were designed by Nils Th. Finstad.

=== Churches ===
The Church of Norway has two parishes (sokn) within Songdalen Municipality. It is part of the Mandal prosti (deanery) in the Diocese of Agder og Telemark.

Churches in Songdalen Municipality
Parish (sokn)	Church name	Location of the church	Year built
Finsland	Finsland Church	Finsland	1803
Greipstad	Greipstad Church	Nodeland	1829

== Geography ==
Songdalen was an inland municipality near the southern tip of Norway. Kristiansand Municipality and Vennesla Municipality were located to the east, Marnardal Municipality was located to the west, and Søgne Municipality was located to the south. Songdalen's administrative centre, Nodeland, is a short 10-minute drive from the center of the city of Kristiansand.

The landscape of the municipality was heavily shaped by the last ice age. The river Songdalselva flows through the valley that made up the southern part of the municipality. The river passed through a 1 kilometre (0.62 mi) long, 100 metres (330 ft) deep scenic narrow gorge called (Juve) at Underåsen. It is recognized for fishing, canoeing, and other recreational opportunities.

Southern Songdalen's elevation was close to sea level, but it increased in the northern part of the municipality. The highest point in the municipality was the 413.76-metre (1,357.5 ft) tall mountain Rinnan. The climate changes correspondingly, from a coastal climate in the south to a more inland type climate in the north.

The forests are mixed deciduous and evergreen (heavily forested with oak and pine), with the ratio of pine woods increasing towards the north of the municipality. Moose and beaver are common in the area.

=== Climate ===
Climate data for Nodeland
Month	Jan	Feb	Mar	Apr	May	Jun	Jul	Aug	Sep	Oct	Nov	Dec	Year
Daily mean °C (°F)	−2.2 (28.0)	−2.2 (28.0)	1.0 (33.8)	4.6 (40.3)	10.0 (50.0)	14.1 (57.4)	15.5 (59.9)	14.8 (58.6)	11.5 (52.7)	7.5 (45.5)	3.0 (37.4)	−0.5 (31.1)	6.4 (43.5)
Average precipitation mm (inches)	141 (5.6)	94 (3.7)	100 (3.9)	65 (2.6)	94 (3.7)	82 (3.2)	93 (3.7)	127 (5.0)	160 (6.3)	187 (7.4)	187 (7.4)	140 (5.5)	1,470 (57.9)
Source: Norwegian Meteorological Institute

== Government ==
While it existed, Songdalen Municipality was responsible for primary education (through 10th grade), outpatient health services, senior citizen services, welfare and other social services, zoning, economic development, and municipal roads and utilities. The municipality was governed by a municipal council of directly elected representatives. The mayor was indirectly elected by a vote of the municipal council. The municipality was under the jurisdiction of the Kristiansand District Court and the Agder Court of Appeal.

=== Municipal council ===
The municipal council (Kommunestyre) of Songdalen Municipality was made up of 25 representatives that were elected to four year terms. The tables below show the historical composition of the council by political party.

Songdalen kommunestyre 2015–2019
Party name (in Norwegian)	Number of representatives
Labour Party (Arbeiderpartiet)	6
Progress Party (Fremskrittspartiet)	3
Green Party (Miljøpartiet De Grønne)	1
Conservative Party (Høyre)	3
Christian Democratic Party (Kristelig Folkeparti)	4
Centre Party (Senterpartiet)	7
Liberal Party (Venstre)	1
Total number of members:	25
Note: On 1 January 2020, Songdalen Municipality became part of Kristiansand Municipality.

Songdalen kommunestyre 2011–2015
Party name (in Norwegian)	Number of representatives
Labour Party (Arbeiderpartiet)	6
Progress Party (Fremskrittspartiet)	4
Conservative Party (Høyre)	4
Christian Democratic Party (Kristelig Folkeparti)	4
Centre Party (Senterpartiet)	6
Liberal Party (Venstre)	1
Total number of members:	25

Songdalen kommunestyre 2007–2011
Party name (in Norwegian)	Number of representatives
Labour Party (Arbeiderpartiet)	6
Progress Party (Fremskrittspartiet)	5
Conservative Party (Høyre)	4
Christian Democratic Party (Kristelig Folkeparti)	4
Centre Party (Senterpartiet)	6
Total number of members:	25

Songdalen kommunestyre 2003–2007
Party name (in Norwegian)	Number of representatives
Labour Party (Arbeiderpartiet)	6
Progress Party (Fremskrittspartiet)	4
Conservative Party (Høyre)	4
Christian Democratic Party (Kristelig Folkeparti)	5
The Democrats (Demokratene)	1
Centre Party (Senterpartiet)	5
Total number of members:	25

Songdalen kommunestyre 1999–2003
Party name (in Norwegian)	Number of representatives
Labour Party (Arbeiderpartiet)	6
Progress Party (Fremskrittspartiet)	3
Conservative Party (Høyre)	4
Christian Democratic Party (Kristelig Folkeparti)	6
Centre Party (Senterpartiet)	5
Liberal Party (Venstre)	1
Total number of members:	25

Songdalen kommunestyre 1995–1999
Party name (in Norwegian)	Number of representatives
Labour Party (Arbeiderpartiet)	6
Progress Party (Fremskrittspartiet)	1
Conservative Party (Høyre)	2
Christian Democratic Party (Kristelig Folkeparti)	8
Centre Party (Senterpartiet)	7
Liberal Party (Venstre)	1
Total number of members:	25

Songdalen kommunestyre 1991–1995
Party name (in Norwegian)	Number of representatives
Labour Party (Arbeiderpartiet)	6
Progress Party (Fremskrittspartiet)	2
Conservative Party (Høyre)	5
Christian Democratic Party (Kristelig Folkeparti)	6
Centre Party (Senterpartiet)	5
Liberal Party (Venstre)	1
Total number of members:	25

Songdalen kommunestyre 1987–1991
Party name (in Norwegian)	Number of representatives
Labour Party (Arbeiderpartiet)	8
Conservative Party (Høyre)	5
Christian Democratic Party (Kristelig Folkeparti)	5
Centre Party (Senterpartiet)	5
Liberal Party (Venstre)	1
Cross-party environment list (Tverrpolitisk Nærmiljøliste)	1
Total number of members:	25

Songdalen kommunestyre 1983–1987
Party name (in Norwegian)	Number of representatives
Labour Party (Arbeiderpartiet)	9
Conservative Party (Høyre)	5
Christian Democratic Party (Kristelig Folkeparti)	5
Centre Party (Senterpartiet)	5
Liberal Party (Venstre)	1
Total number of members:	25

Songdalen kommunestyre 1979–1983
Party name (in Norwegian)	Number of representatives
Labour Party (Arbeiderpartiet)	6
Conservative Party (Høyre)	5
Christian Democratic Party (Kristelig Folkeparti)	4
New People's Party (Nye Folkepartiet)	1
Centre Party (Senterpartiet)	5
Total number of members:	21

Songdalen kommunestyre 1975–1979
Party name (in Norwegian)	Number of representatives
Labour Party (Arbeiderpartiet)	6
Anders Lange's Party (Anders Langes parti)	2
Conservative Party (Høyre)	2
Christian Democratic Party (Kristelig Folkeparti)	5
New People's Party (Nye Folkepartiet)	1
Centre Party (Senterpartiet)	5
Total number of members:	21

Songdalen kommunestyre 1971–1975
Party name (in Norwegian)	Number of representatives
Labour Party (Arbeiderpartiet)	7
Conservative Party (Høyre)	1
Christian Democratic Party (Kristelig Folkeparti)	3
Centre Party (Senterpartiet)	6
Liberal Party (Venstre)	4
Total number of members:	21

Songdalen kommunestyre 1967–1971
Party name (in Norwegian)	Number of representatives
Labour Party (Arbeiderpartiet)	7
Conservative Party (Høyre)	1
Christian Democratic Party (Kristelig Folkeparti)	2
Centre Party (Senterpartiet)	6
Liberal Party (Venstre)	5
Total number of members:	21

Songdalen kommunestyre 1964–1967
Party name (in Norwegian)	Number of representatives
Labour Party (Arbeiderpartiet)	7
Christian Democratic Party (Kristelig Folkeparti)	2
Centre Party (Senterpartiet)	6
Liberal Party (Venstre)	6
Total number of members:	21

=== Mayors ===
The mayor (Norwegian: ordfører) of Songdalen Municipality was the political leader of the municipality and the chairperson of the municipal council. The following people have held this position:

- 1964–1971: Thøger Øvland (V)
- 1971–1975: Jon Johnsen (Sp)
- 1975–1979: Svein Harald Follerås (Sp)
- 1979–1987: Bergtor Dybesland (Sp)
- 1987–1995: John Sverre Hjemlestad (H)
- 1995–1999: Jan Kåre Haugland (KrF)
- 1999–2003: Øystein Olsen (Ap)
- 2003–2019: Johnny Greibesland (Sp)

== History ==
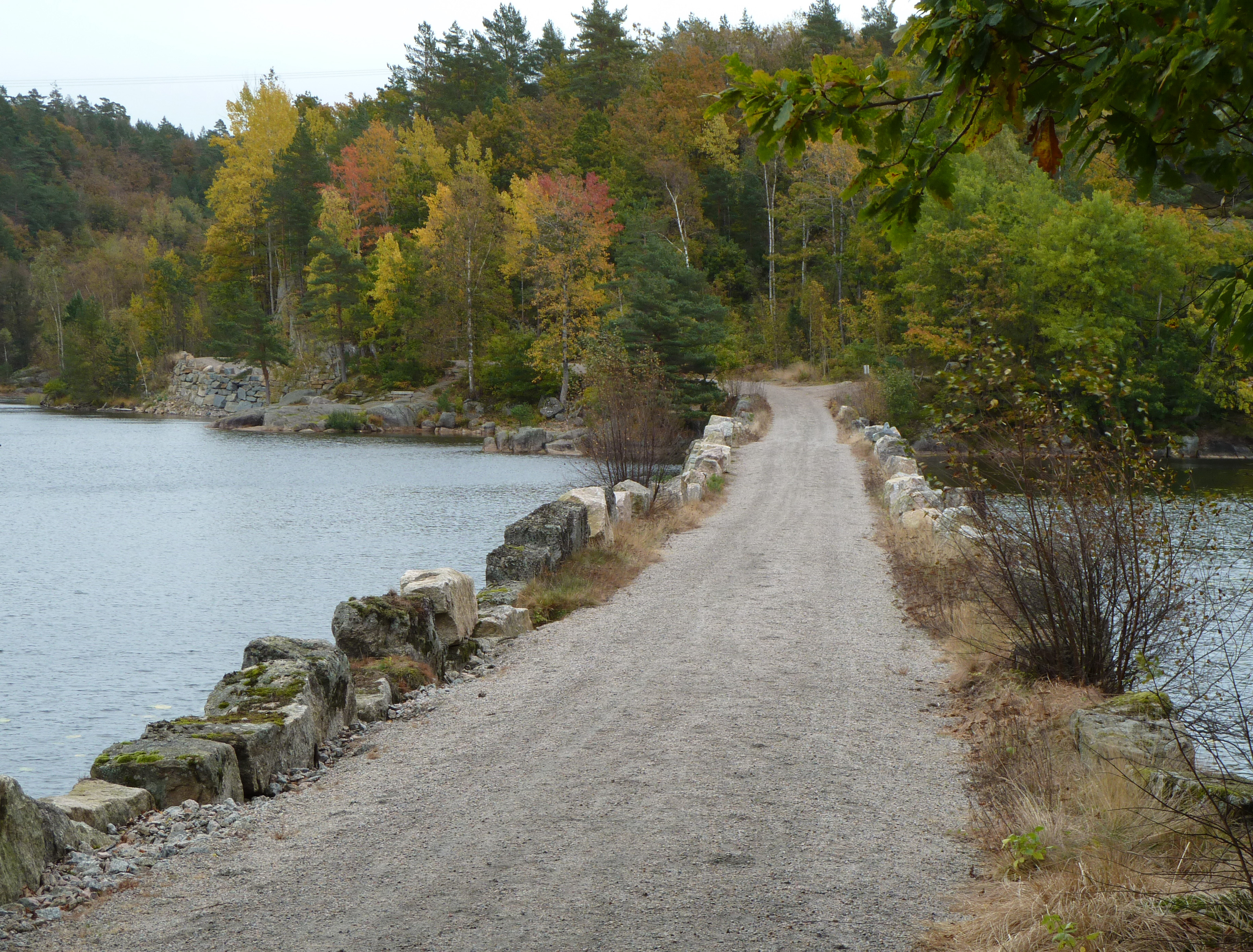
View of the old Vestlandske hovedvei, the 1790-era highway from Kristiansand to Mandal, in the Kislevann area in Songdalen

In 1964, Finsland Municipality and Greipstad Municipality, along with the Eikeland area of neighboring Øvrebø Municipality, were merged to form Songdalen municipality.

Greipstad is mentioned in written sources as early as 1344. Through the Middle Ages records indicate that Greipstad, a small farm community with 34 farms, was continuously inhabited. Greipstad became an independent municipality in 1913; split off from Søgne Municipality.

Finsland, which lies further from the coast, has few preserved written records, but records have indications of farms there in the year 1000.

An 8-kilometre (5.0 mi) long section of the old Vestlandske Hovedvei (Westland Highway) passes through the municipality from Farvannet to Kvislevann. The highway was built in the 1790s and the section exists today in much the same way as it did for ordinary traffic in 1881.

The fortifications at Rossevann were built in 1916-1917 for the Stavanger Battalion. The municipality also has visible evidence of World War II fortifications.

== See also ==
- List of former municipalities of Norway
