= Greipstad Municipality =

Former municipality in Vest-Agder, Norway

Greipstad Municipality Greipstad herad
- Former municipality
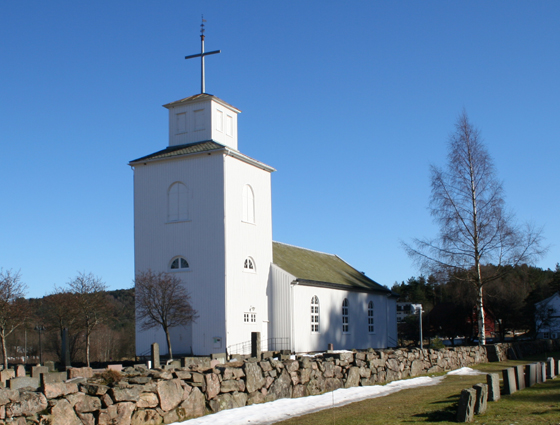
- View of the local church in Nodeland

- Vest-Agder within Norway

- Greipstad within Vest-Agder
- Coordinates: 58°09′14″N 07°49′29″E
- Country: Norway
- County: Vest-Agder
- District: Sørlandet
- Established: 1 Jan 1913
  - Preceded by: Søgne Municipality
- Disestablished: 1 Jan 1964
  - Succeeded by: Songdalen Municipality
- Administrative centre: Nodeland

Government
  - Mayor (1955–1963): Thorleif K. Skaar (V)

Area (upon dissolution)
  - Total: 104.4 km^{2} (40.3 sq mi)
  - Rank: #511 in Norway
- Highest elevation: 301 m (988 ft)

Population (1963)
  - Total: 2,010
  - Rank: #436 in Norway
  - Density: 19.3/km^{2} (50/sq mi)
  - Change (10 years): ▲ +37.2%
- Demonym: Greipsdøling

Official language
  - Norwegian form: Nynorsk
- Time zone: UTC+01:00 (CET)
  - Summer (DST): UTC+02:00 (CEST)
- ISO 3166 code: NO-1017

Greipstad is a former municipality in the old Vest-Agder county, Norway. The 104.4-square-kilometre (40.3 sq mi) municipality existed from 1913 until its dissolution in 1964. The area is now part of Kristiansand Municipality in Agder county. The administrative centre was the village of Nodeland where Greipstad Church is located.

Prior to its dissolution in 1964, the 104.4-square-kilometre (40.3 sq mi) municipality was the 511th largest by area out of the 689 municipalities in Norway. Greipstad Municipality was the 436th most populous municipality in Norway with a population of about 2,010. The municipality's population density was 19.3 inhabitants per square kilometre (50/sq mi) and its population had increased by 37.2% over the previous 10-year period.

== General information ==
The municipality of Greipstad was established on 1 July 1913 when Søgne Municipality was divided into two: the northeaster district (population: 822) became the new Greipstad Municipality and the southwestern district (population: 2,609) continued as a smaller Søgne Municipality.

During the 1960s, there were many municipal mergers across Norway due to the work of the Schei Committee. On 1 January 1964, Greipstad Municipality was dissolved and the following areas were merged to form the new Songdalen Municipality:

- all of Greipstad Municipality (population: 2,061)
- the Eikeland area of Øvrebø Municipality (population: 39)
- most of Finsland Municipality (population: 797), except for the Kleveland bru area which became part of Marnardal Municipality

=== Name ===
The municipality (originally the parish) is named after the old Greipstad farm (Old Norse: Greipsstaðir) since the first Greipstad Church was built there. The first element is the old male name Greipr. The last element is the plural form of staðr which means "place" or "abode".

=== Churches ===
The Church of Norway had one parish (sokn) within Greipstad Municipality. At the time of the municipal dissolution, it was part of the Søgne prestegjeld and the Mandal prosti (deanery) in the Diocese of Agder.

Churches in Greipstad Municipality
| Parish (sokn) | Church name | Location of the church | Year built |
|---|---|---|---|
| Greipstad | Greipstad Church | Nodeland | 1829 |

== Geography ==
The municipality included the Songdalselva river valley and surrounding areas. The highest point in the municipality was the 301-metre (988 ft) tall mountain Hesteheia. Øvrebø Municipality was located to the north, Oddernes Municipality was located to the east, Kristiansand Municipality was located to the southeast, Søgne Municipality was located to the south, and Øyslebø Municipality was located to the west.

== Government ==
While it existed, Greipstad Municipality was responsible for primary education (through 10th grade), outpatient health services, senior citizen services, welfare and other social services, zoning, economic development, and municipal roads and utilities. The municipality was governed by a municipal council of directly elected representatives. The mayor was indirectly elected by a vote of the municipal council. The municipality was under the jurisdiction of the Torridal District Court and the Agder Court of Appeal.

=== Municipal council ===
The municipal council (Heradsstyre) of Greipstad Municipality was made up of 13 representatives that were elected to four year terms. The tables below show the historical composition of the council by political party.

Greipstad heradsstyre 1959–1963
| Party name (in Nynorsk) | Number of representatives |
|---|---|
| Labour Party (Arbeidarpartiet) | 5 |
| Centre Party (Senterpartiet) | 3 |
| Liberal Party (Venstre) | 5 |
| Total number of members: | 13 |
Note: On 1 January 1964, Greipstad Municipality became part of Songdalen Municipality.

Greipstad heradsstyre 1955–1959
| Party name (in Nynorsk) | Number of representatives |
|---|---|
| Labour Party (Arbeidarpartiet) | 5 |
| Farmers' Party (Bondepartiet) | 4 |
| Liberal Party (Venstre) | 4 |
| Total number of members: | 13 |

Greipstad heradsstyre 1951–1955
| Party name (in Nynorsk) | Number of representatives |
|---|---|
| Labour Party (Arbeidarpartiet) | 4 |
| Farmers' Party (Bondepartiet) | 4 |
| Liberal Party (Venstre) | 4 |
| Total number of members: | 12 |

Greipstad heradsstyre 1947–1951
| Party name (in Nynorsk) | Number of representatives |
|---|---|
| Labour Party (Arbeidarpartiet) | 4 |
| Joint List(s) of Non-Socialist Parties (Borgarlege Felleslister) | 8 |
| Total number of members: | 12 |

Greipstad heradsstyre 1945–1947
| Party name (in Nynorsk) | Number of representatives |
|---|---|
| Labour Party (Arbeidarpartiet) | 5 |
| Farmers' Party (Bondepartiet) | 4 |
| Joint list of the Liberal Party (Venstre) and the Radical People's Party (Radikale Folkepartiet) | 3 |
| Total number of members: | 12 |

Greipstad heradsstyre 1937–1941*
| Party name (in Nynorsk) | Number of representatives |
|---|---|
| Labour Party (Arbeidarpartiet) | 4 |
| Farmers' Party (Bondepartiet) | 4 |
| Liberal Party (Venstre) | 4 |
| Total number of members: | 12 |
Note: Due to the German occupation of Norway during World War II, no elections were held for new municipal councils until after the war ended in 1945.

=== Mayors ===
The mayor (Nynorsk: ordførar) of Greipstad Municipality was the political leader of the municipality and the chairperson of the municipal council. The following people have held this position:

- 1913–1916: Nils Emil Rosseland
- 1916–1919: Nils Thorkelsen Haus
- 1919–1925: Baard Mølland
- 1925–1928: Anstein Åsen
- 1928–1931: Baard Mølland
- 1931–1934: Herman Haugland
- 1934–1937: Anstein Åsen
- 1937–1941: Lars Tronstad (Bp)
- 1941–1942: Herman Haugland (NS)
- 1942–1944: Thomas Birkeland (NS)
- 1944–1945: Nils Fuskeland (NS)
- 1945–1955: Jørgen Aurebekk (Bp)
- 1955–1963: Thorleif K. Skaar (V)

== See also ==
- List of former municipalities of Norway
