= Finsland Municipality =

Former municipality in Vest-Agder, Norway

Finsland Municipality Finsland herad
- Former municipality
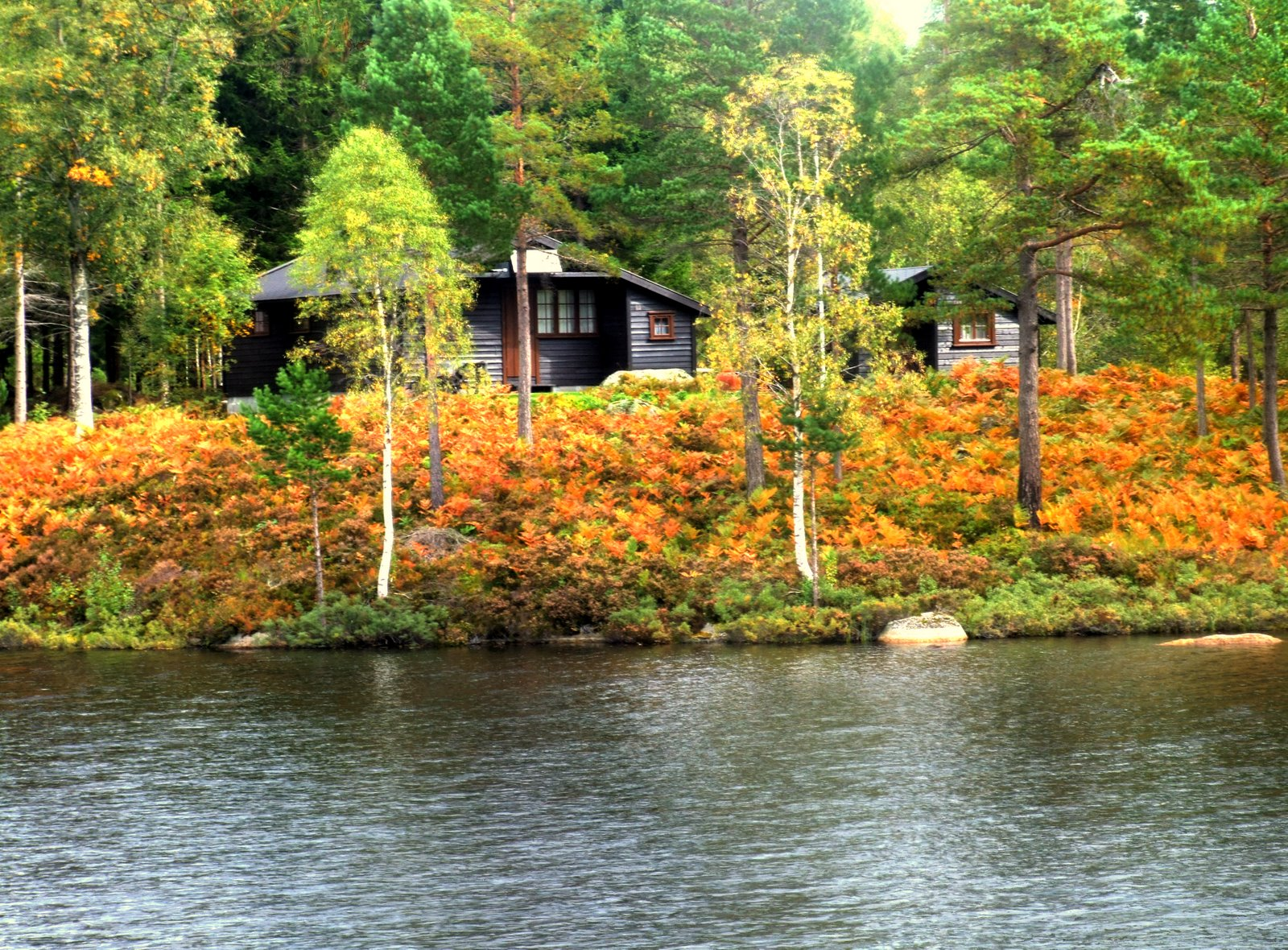

- Vest-Agder within Norway

- Finsland within Vest-Agder
- Coordinates: 58°17′23″N 07°36′51″E
- Country: Norway
- County: Vest-Agder
- District: Sørlandet
- Established: 1 Jan 1838
  - Created as: Formannskapsdistrikt
- Disestablished: 1 Jan 1964
  - Succeeded by: Songdalen Municipality
- Administrative centre: Finsland

Government
  - Mayor (1962–1963): Ola J. Grindland

Area (upon dissolution)
  - Total: 114.9 km^{2} (44.4 sq mi)
  - Rank: #491 in Norway
- Highest elevation: 413.76 m (1,357.5 ft)

Population (1963)
  - Total: 847
  - Rank: #635 in Norway
  - Density: 7.4/km^{2} (19/sq mi)
  - Change (10 years): ▼ −9.7%

Official language
  - Norwegian form: Nynorsk
- Time zone: UTC+01:00 (CET)
  - Summer (DST): UTC+02:00 (CEST)
- ISO 3166 code: NO-1023

Finsland is a former municipality in the old Vest-Agder county, Norway. The 114.9-square-kilometre (44.4 sq mi) municipality existed from 1838 until its dissolution in 1964. The area is now part of Kristiansand Municipality in Agder county. The administrative centre was the village of Finsland where Finsland Church is located.

Prior to its dissolution in 1964, the 114.9-square-kilometre (44.4 sq mi) municipality was the 491st largest by area out of the 689 municipalities in Norway. Finsland Municipality was the 635th most populous municipality in Norway with a population of about 847. The municipality's population density was 7.4 inhabitants per square kilometre (19/sq mi) and its population had decreased by 9.7% over the previous 10-year period.

== General information ==
The parish of Finsland was established as a municipality on 1 January 1838 (see formannskapsdistrikt law).

During the 1960s, there were many municipal mergers across Norway due to the work of the Schei Committee. On 1 January 1964, Finsland Municipality was dissolved and its lands were split up between the new Marnardal Municipality and Songdalen Municipality.

The following areas were merged to form the new Marnardal Municipality on 1 January 1964:

- the Kleveland bru area of Finsland Municipality (population: 34)
- all of Laudal Municipality (population: 560)
- most of Bjelland Municipality (population: 535), except for the Ågedal and Midtbø areas which became part of Audnedal Municipality
- most of Øyslebø Municipality (population: 1,068), except for the Brunvatne area which became part of Søgne Municipality

The following areas were merged to form the new Songdalen Municipality on 1 January 1964:

- the rest of Finsland Municipality (population: 797), except for the Kleveland bru area which became part of Marnardal Municipality
- all of Greipstad Municipality (population: 2,061)
- the Eikeland area of Øvrebø Municipality (population: 39)

=== Name ===
The municipality (originally the parish) is named after the old Finsland farm (Old Norse: Finnsáland) since the first Finsland Church was built there. The first element comes from the old name for the local river Finnså. The river name is likely a compound of the words finn and á which means "river". The word finn could be referring specifically to the plant Nardus stricta or to "moorland" or "wilderness" in general. The farm is situated by the river Finnsåna, which flows into the river Mandalselva. There are also farms nearby called Finsdal and Finsådal, so the first element is a common local name. The last element is land which means "land" or "district".

=== Churches ===
The Church of Norway had one parish (sokn) within Finsland Municipality. At the time of the municipal dissolution, it was part of the Bjelland prestegjeld and the Mandal prosti (deanery) in the Diocese of Agder.

Churches in Finsland Municipality
Parish (sokn)	Church name	Location of the church	Year built
Finsland	Finsland Church	Finsland	1803

== Geography ==
The highest point in the municipality was the 413.76-metre (1,357.5 ft) tall mountain Rinnan in the northern part of the municipality. Bjelland Municipality was located to the north, Hægeland Municipality was located to the northeast, Øvrebø Municipality was located to the southeast, Øyslebø Municipality was located to the south, and Laudal Municipality was located to the west.

== Government ==
While it existed, Finsland Municipality was responsible for primary education (through 10th grade), outpatient health services, senior citizen services, welfare and other social services, zoning, economic development, and municipal roads and utilities. The municipality was governed by a municipal council of directly elected representatives. The mayor was indirectly elected by a vote of the municipal council. The municipality was under the jurisdiction of the Mandal District Court and the Agder Court of Appeal.

=== Municipal council ===
The municipal council (Heradsstyre) of Finsland Municipality was made up of 13 representatives that were elected to four year terms. The tables below show the historical composition of the council by political party.

Finsland heradsstyre 1959–1963
Party name (in Nynorsk)	Number of representatives
Labour Party (Arbeidarpartiet)	1
Christian Democratic Party (Kristeleg Folkeparti)	2
Centre Party (Senterpartiet)	9
Liberal Party (Venstre)	1
Total number of members:	13
Note: On 1 January 1964, Finsland Municipality became part of Songdalen Municipality.

Finsland heradsstyre 1955–1959
Party name (in Nynorsk)	Number of representatives
Christian Democratic Party (Kristeleg Folkeparti)	2
Farmers' Party (Bondepartiet)	10
Liberal Party (Venstre)	1
Total number of members:	13

Finsland heradsstyre 1951–1955
Party name (in Nynorsk)	Number of representatives
Labour Party (Arbeidarpartiet)	1
Christian Democratic Party (Kristeleg Folkeparti)	2
Joint List(s) of Non-Socialist Parties (Borgarlege Felleslister)	8
Local List(s) (Lokale lister)	1
Total number of members:	12

Finsland heradsstyre 1947–1951
Party name (in Nynorsk)	Number of representatives
Labour Party (Arbeidarpartiet)	1
Joint List(s) of Non-Socialist Parties (Borgarlege Felleslister)	11
Total number of members:	12

Finsland heradsstyre 1945–1947
Party name (in Nynorsk)	Number of representatives
Labour Party (Arbeidarpartiet)	1
Joint List(s) of Non-Socialist Parties (Borgarlege Felleslister)	11
Total number of members:	12

Finsland heradsstyre 1937–1941*
Party name (in Nynorsk)	Number of representatives
Labour Party (Arbeidarpartiet)	1
Farmers' Party (Bondepartiet)	9
Joint List(s) of Non-Socialist Parties (Borgarlege Felleslister)	2
Total number of members:	12
Note: Due to the German occupation of Norway during World War II, no elections were held for new municipal councils until after the war ended in 1945.

=== Mayors ===
The mayor (Nynorsk: ordførar) of Finsland Municipality was the political leader of the municipality and the chairperson of the municipal council. The following people have held this position:

- 1838–1839: Lars Sørensen Mandflaae
- 1839–1841: Salve Andersen Frigstad
- 1842–1843: Gunder Andersen Watnelie
- 1844–1847: Lars Sørensen Mandflaae
- 1848–1855: Gunder Andersen Watnelie
- 1856–1859: Lars Nilsen Mæsel
- 1859–1867: Guttorm Olsen Øvland
- 1867–1871: Jens Olsen Slottet
- 1871–1880: Anders Salvesen Frigstad
- 1880–1884: Jens Olsen Slottet
- 1884–1889: Jens Olsen Eftestad
- 1889–1894: Jens Olsen Slottet
- 1894–1919: Ola Grindland
- 1919–1923: Salve P. Helland
- 1923–1935: Andreas Haugedal
- 1935–1942: Syvert Mæsel
- 1942–1945: Anders Finsland
- 1945–1946: Syvert Mæsel
- 1946–1948: Søren H. Åsland
- 1948–1952: Sigurd Follerås
- 1952–1956: Syvert Mæsel
- 1956–1960: Nils J. Kleveland
- 1960–1962: Sigurd Follerås
- 1962–1963: Ola J. Grindland

== See also ==
- List of former municipalities of Norway
