= Breland Station =

Railway station in Marnardal, Norway

Breland
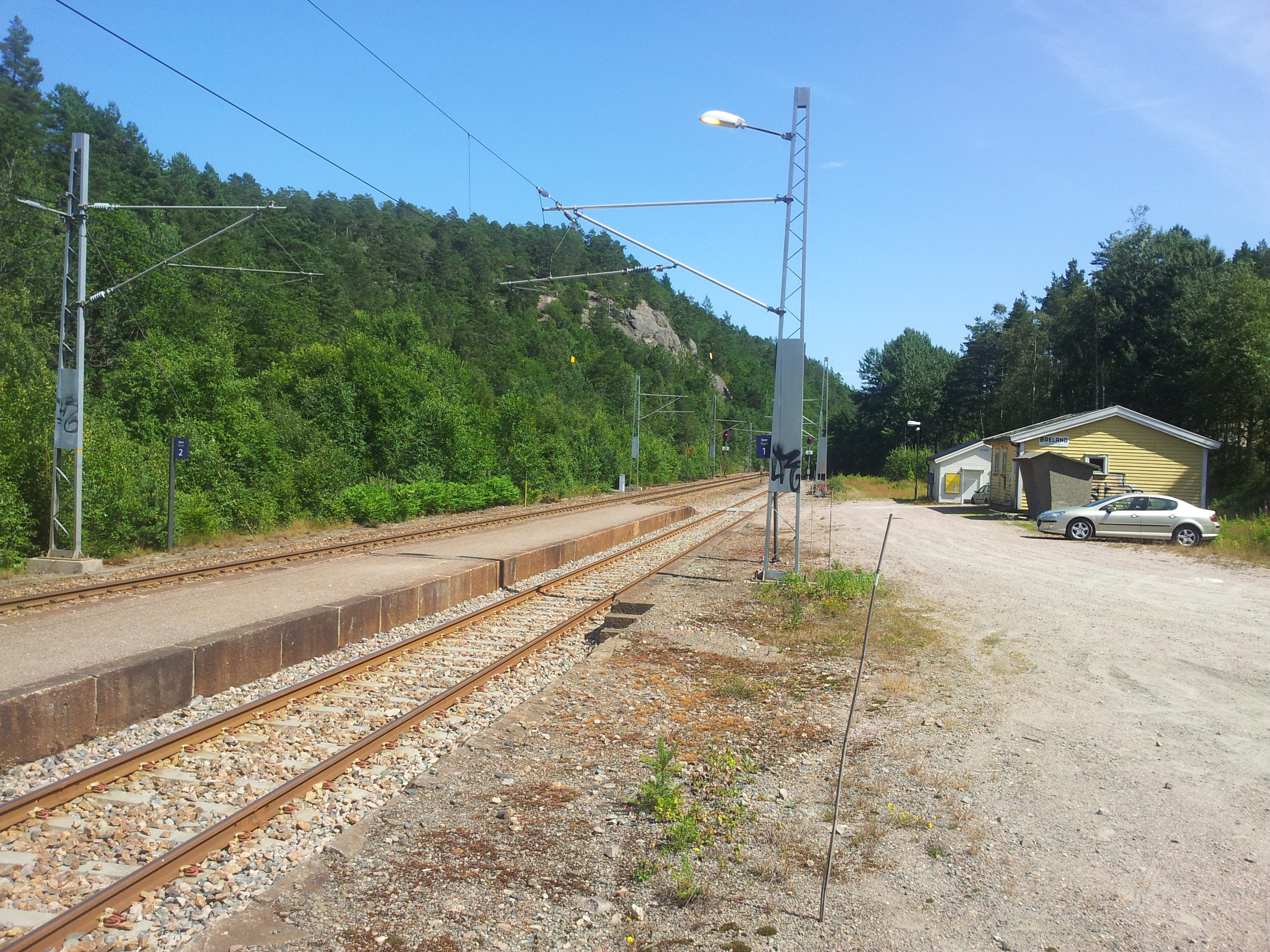

General information
- Location: Breland, Lindesnes Municipality; Norway
- Coordinates: 58°11′58.86″N 7°43′9.52″E
- Elevation: 176.9 m (580 ft) AMSL
- Owner: Bane NOR
- Operator: Go-Ahead Norge
- Line: Sørlandet Line
- Distance: 385.10 km (239.29 mi)
- Platforms: 2
- Tracks: 2

Construction
- Parking: 8 places
- Cycle facilities: No
- Accessible: No
- Architect: NSB Arkitektkontor

History
- Opened: 17 December 1943

Passengers
- 2,200 (annually)
Location
- Location within Agder Location within Norway

Breland Station (Norwegian: Breland stasjon) is a railway station on the Sørlandet Line situated in the village of Breland in Lindesnes Municipality in Agder county, Norway. Located 385.10 kilometers (239.29 mi) from Oslo Central Station, it is served by a single long-distance train in each direction, operated by Go-Ahead Norge, to serve commuter traffic to and from the town of Kristiansand. The station has two platforms and a passing loop, although the main platform is only 46 meters (151 ft) long.

The station was opened on 17 December 1943 as part of the segment of the Sørlandet Line between Kristiansand and Sira. The line past the station was electrified in 1946 and the station automated in 1969. The following year the station became unstaffed and the station building was demolished in 1987. The Norwegian National Rail Administration has decided to close the station in 2019, as it only served 2,200 annual passengers in 2008.

== History ==
Breland Station was built during the Second World War under the German-administrated expansion of the Sørlandet Line west of Kristiansand. The station building was completed in 1942 after designs by NSB Arkitektkontor. It was originally proposed to be named Bredland, but this was changed to Breland. Irregular revenue traffic commenced on the line on 17 December 1943 and the station became operative from the same day. Ordinary traffic commenced on 1 March 1944. Electric traction was not introduced until 16 May 1946, as part of the electrification from Marnardal Station to Kristiansand Station.

An interlocking system became operational on 10 September 1969, allowing the station to become remotely controlled from 19 November 1969. The station became unstaffed from 1 June 1970, and the station building was demolished in 1987.

== Facilities ==
Breland Station is a station on the Sørlandet Line, located 385.10 kilometers (239.29 mi) from Oslo Central Station at an elevation of 176.9 meters (580 ft) above mean sea level. The station features a 308-meter (1,010 ft) passing loop. There is a main side platform serving track 1, which is 49 meters (161 ft) long, and a 35-meter (115 ft) island platform serving track 2. Both are 35 centimeters (14 in) tall. There is a waiting shed.

Like the other stations along the Sørlandet Line, the now demolished station building at Breland received a standardized design. It was built in the overall Neoclassical architecture style adapted in the 1920s. By the 1940s the designs had been altered to include elements of functionalism. It has siding of weatherboard.

Breland Station features free parking for eight cars. The station serves the village of Breland in Marnardal, which has about 70 residents within 2 kilometers (1.2 mi) of the station. The train is the sole form of public transport from the community. It had 2,200 annual passengers in 2008.

== Service ==
The station is served by long-distance trains operated by the Norwegian State Railways. Because of the limit catchment, only a single train in each direction serves the station each day. This is aimed at commuting to Kristiansand—a morning train to town and an afternoon train from town. These trains continue onwards to Oslo and Stavanger, respectively. Travel time to Kristiansand is 18 minutes.

== Future ==
The short platforms have caused the Norwegian Railway Authority to demand that they be lengthened by 2019, or the station will be closed. The National Rail Administration has decided that an 13 million kr investment in the station was not worthwhile. The closing was announced in 2010, along with the closing of five other stations on the line. Passengers from Breland can drive 15 kilometers (9 mi) to Nodeland Station and take the train from there. Not stopping at Breland will allow the trains to save about two minutes. As the schedule is tied to passing loops, this will probably not save time overall for the line, but it will allow for more robustness.

Preceding station	Express trains	Following station
Marnardal towards Stavanger	F5	Nodeland towards Oslo S
