= Kilen, Kristiansand =

Village in Kristiansand Municipality, Norway

Kilen
- Village
- Interactive map of Kilen
- Coordinates: 58.27028°N 7.66004°E
- Country: Norway
- Region: Southern Norway
- County: Agder
- Municipality: Kristiansand Municipality
- Elevation: 191 m (627 ft)
- Time zone: UTC+01:00 (CET)
  - Summer (DST): UTC+02:00 (CEST)
- Post Code: 4646 Finsland

Kilen is a village in Kristiansand Municipality in Agder county, Norway. The village is located in the northern part of the municipality on the east coast of the lake Livatnet. The village of Finsland lies about 8 kilometres (5.0 mi) to the northwest and village of Nodeland lies about 20 kilometres (12 mi) to the southeast.
