= Marnardal Station =

Railway station in Marnardal, Norway

Marnardal
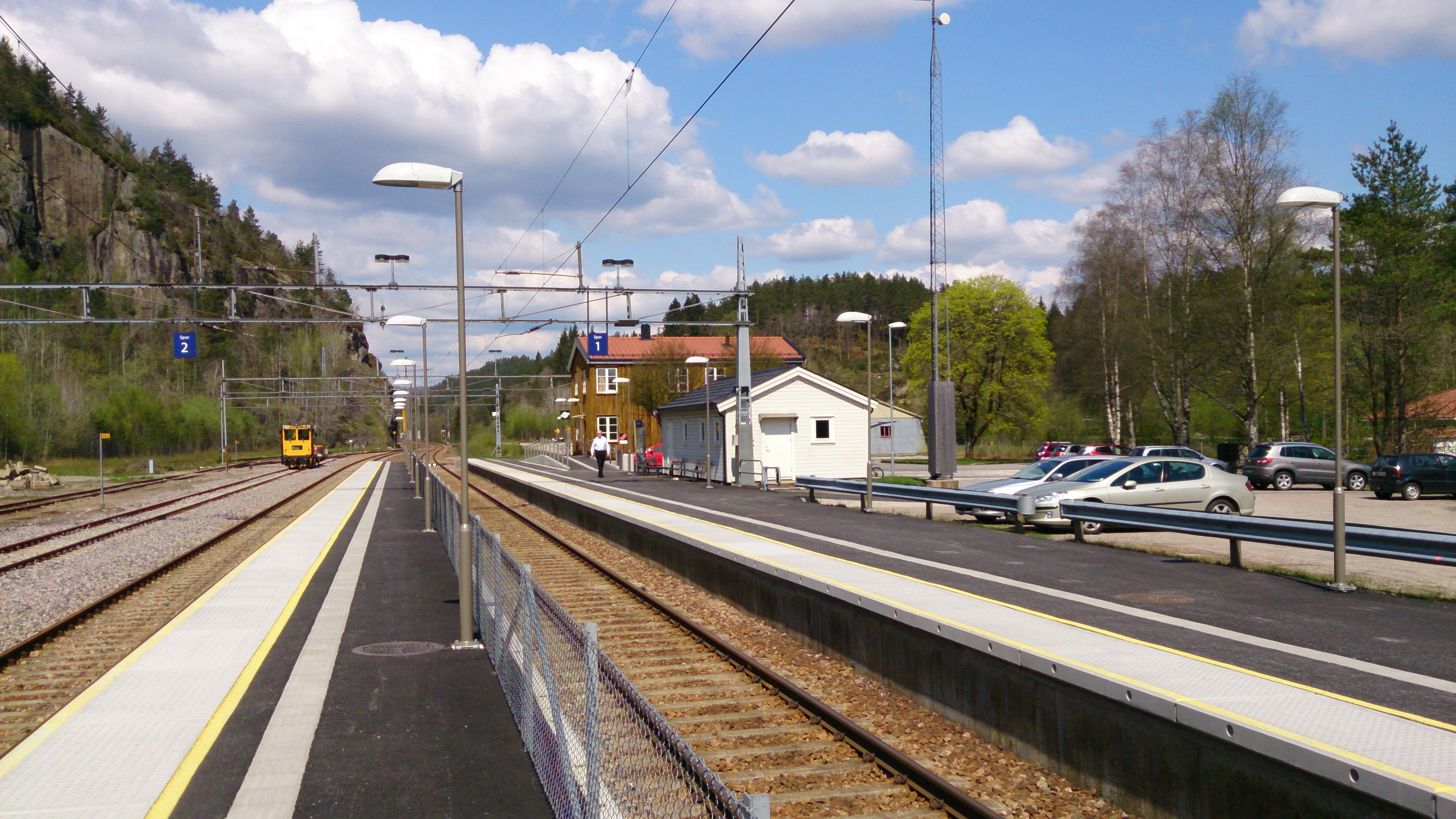

General information
- Location: Heddeland, Lindesnes Municipality; Norway
- Coordinates: 58°12′45.18″N 07°30′43.77″E
- Elevation: 38.3 m (126 ft) AMSL
- Owner: Bane NOR
- Operator: Go-Ahead Norge
- Line: Sørlandet Line
- Distance: 402.02 km (249.80 mi)
- Platforms: 2
- Tracks: 3

Construction
- Parking: 15 places
- Cycle facilities: Yes
- Accessible: Yes
- Architect: NSB Arkitektkontor

Other information
- Station code: MDL

History
- Opened: 17 December 1943
- Rebuilt: 2012

Passengers
- 21,700 (annually)
Location
- Location within Agder Location within Norway

Marnardal Station (Norwegian: Marnardal stasjon) is a railway station of the Sørlandet Line situated just north of the village of Heddeland in Lindesnes Municipality in Agder county, Norway. Located 402.02 kilometers (249.80 mi) from Oslo Central Station, it is served by long-distance trains operated by Go-Ahead Norge. In addition to intercity services to Oslo and Stavanger, the eight daily trains in each direction trains serve as a commuter link to Kristiansand Station. The station features two platform and three tracks, as well as a station building.

The station was opened on 17 December 1943 as part of the segment of the Sørlandet Line between Kristiansand and Sira. The line past the station was electrified from 18 February 1944. The station was automated in 1969, but remained staffed until 1988. The passing loop was extended in 1992, reaching its current length of 803 meters (2,635 ft). The platforms were renovated and extended in 2012. Marnardal Station had 21,700 passengers in 2008.

== History ==
Marnardal Station was built during the Second World War under the German-administrated expansion of the Sørlandet Line west of Kristiansand. Instead of running along the more densely populated coast, the line was built through the interior of Vest-Agder. Marnardal Station was planned as a primary station, which was to serve the Marnardal valley and its various communities. This included the coastal town of Mandal, situated 25 kilometers (16 mi) to the south, at the mouth of the valley. The station was originally proposed to be named Øyslebø, the name of the municipality at the time. Instead a new name was constructed by folklorist Knut Liestøl. He took the name of the river, Mandalselva, used its genitive form marnar and added suffix dal which means "valley". The name was so quickly adopted by the locals that it was used as the name of the new Marnardal Municipality in the municipal amalgamation that occurred in 1964.

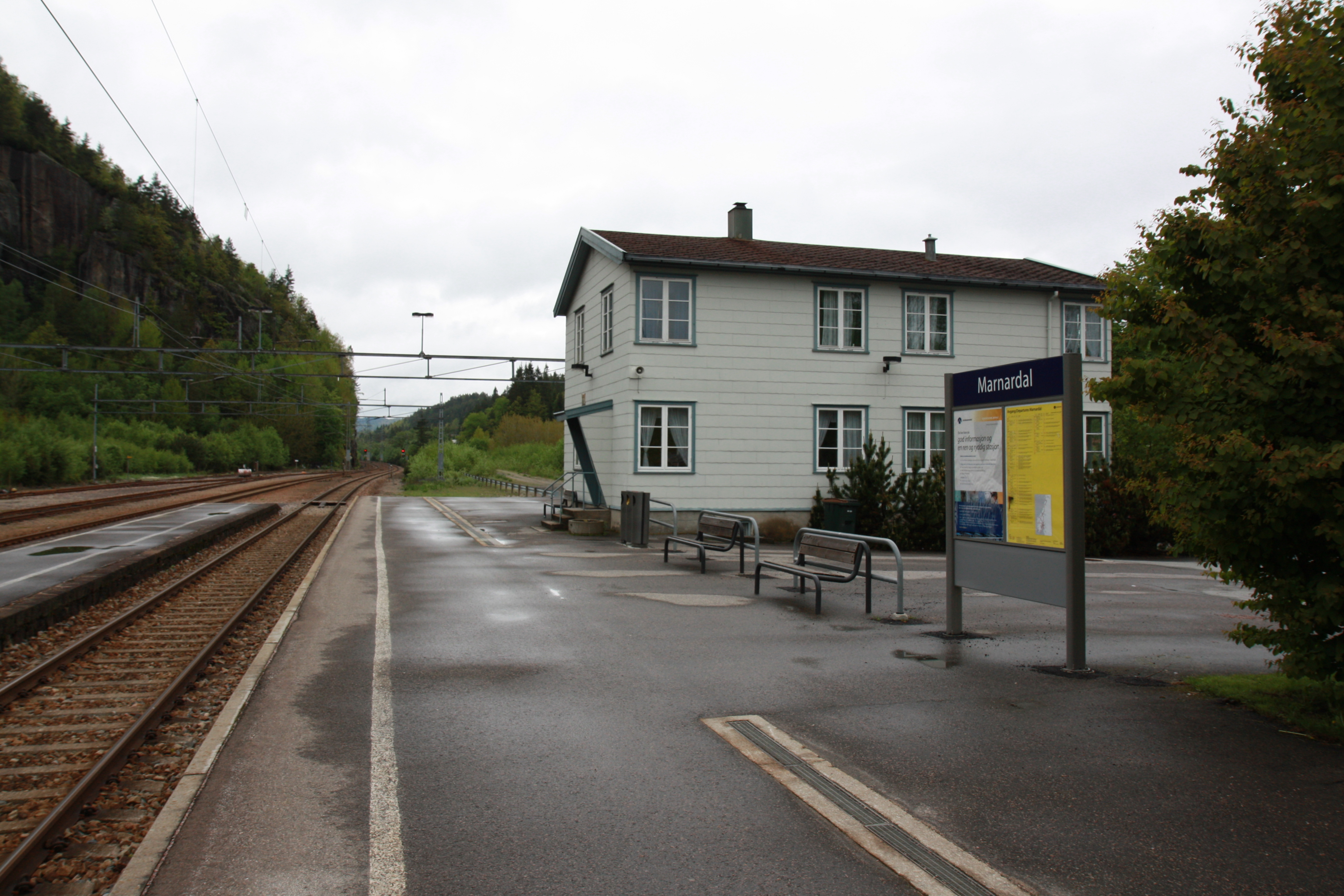
The station in 2009, before the platform upgrades

Work on the line started in 1930 and by 1934 work had reached Marnardal. During the following years the population increased with 300 due to the influx of workforce for the railway. The station building was completed in 1942 after designs by NSB Arkitektkontor. It was originally proposed to be named Øyslebø, but this was changed to Marnardal. Irregular revenue traffic commenced on the line on 17 December 1943 and the station became operative from the same day. Ordinary traffic commenced on 1 March 1944. The line from Marnardal Station to Sira Station received electric traction from 18 February 1944, while the electrification on the section form Marnardal to Kristiansand Station was not completed until 16 May 1946. Because of the switch from steam to electric traction at the station, Marnardal received a turntable and an engine shed.

At its peak the station employed 15 people, including line crew. The first stage of automation came with the interlocking system becoming operational on 1 June 1961. This allowed the station to become remotely controlled from 19 November 1969. However, it remained staffed for ticket sales until 13 June 1988. The passing loop was extended in 1992. Due to short platforms, Marnardal Station was in a 2010 report proposed to be renovated or closed. Due to this report, the Norwegian National Rail Administration carried out a major renovation in 2012. Work on the tracks and overhead wires started in March and work on the platforms started in May. The latter included building longer and higher platforms, as well as renovating the station building. The original island platform serving track 2 was too narrow, causing the entire track to have to be moved. Track 3 was also moved and modernized. The works cost 26 million kr and was officially opened on 19 November 2012. The upgrades were in anticipation to receive an increase in the frequency, improving the attraction for commuters further. The municipality followed up with zoning additional housing close by the station.

== Facilities ==
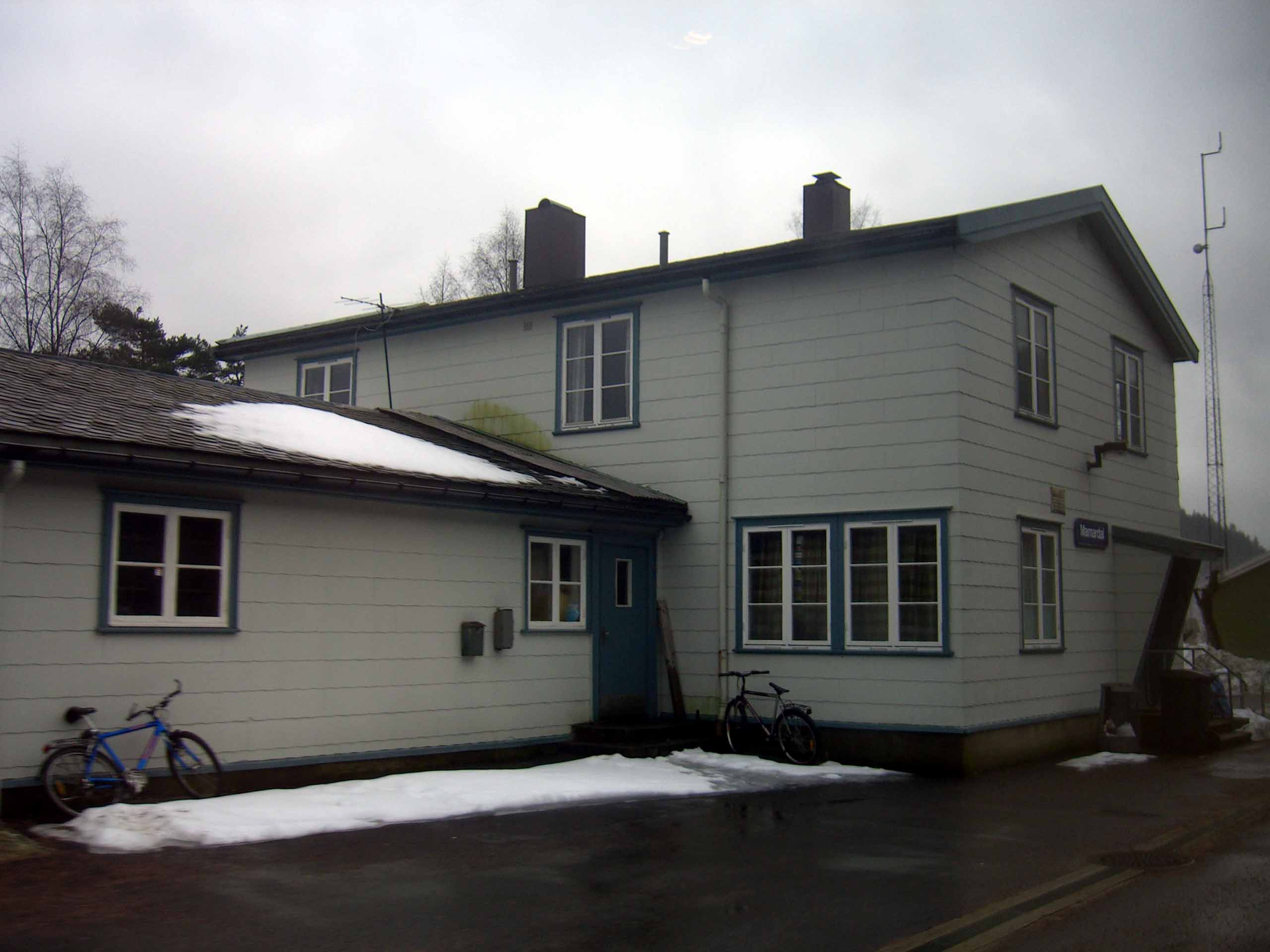
The station building

Marnardal Station is a station on the Sørlandet Line, located 402.02 kilometers (249.80 mi) from Oslo Central Station at an elevation of 38.3 meters (126 ft) above mean sea level. The station features a passing loop with two side tracks. The main passing track is 803 meters (2,635 ft) long.

The station buildings along the Sørlandet Line were mostly standardized designs. Marnardal followed late in a rather standardized period of Neoclassical architecture used by the Norwegian State Railways since the 1920s. By the 1940s the designs had been altered to include elements of functionalism. It has siding of weatherboard and was built with two stories, providing an upper story for a station master's residence. The design was altered from the norm by having the two-storey section built normally to the single-storey section. A similar design was chosen at Snartemo Station.

Most trains serve track 1, a side platform situation at grade with the station building, access roads and parking. Track 2 is served with an island platform, albeit which only has access to trains on the one track. Track 2 is only used when two passenger trains pass at the station. Both platforms are 220 meters (720 ft) long and 76 centimeters (30 in) tall. The station building is open around the clock except from 21:00 on Saturday to 07:00 on Sunday. It has universal accessibility, including to its washroom. There is parking for 15 cars and a roofed bicycle stand. There is no ticket machine.

== Service ==
The station is served by long-distance trains operated by Go-Ahead, counting eight daily services on weekdays, including a night train service. These operate from Oslo via Kristiansand to Stavanger. Marnardal is located within the commuter belt of the town of Kristiansand. In this area a major task of the Sørlandet Line trains are to feed commuters to the city. Trains use about 30 minutes to Kristiansand, while driving time by car is about one hour, due to the train line's many tunnels. The train is therefore popular amongst commuters. The station had 21,700 annual passengers in 2008. There is bus services which connect to surrounding areas.

Preceding station	Express trains	Following station
Audnedal towards Stavanger	F5	Breland towards Oslo S
Audnedal towards Stavanger	F5	Nodeland towards Oslo S
