= Volleberg =

Village in Kristiansand Municipality, Norway

- Village
- Interactive map of Volleberg
- Coordinates: 58.12201°N 7.84932°E
- Country: Norway
- Region: Southern Norway
- County: Agder
- Municipality: Kristiansand Municipality

Area
  - Total: 0.3 km^{2} (0.12 sq mi)
- Elevation: 63 m (207 ft)

Population (2025)
  - Total: 580
  - Density: 1,933/km^{2} (5,010/sq mi)
- Time zone: UTC+01:00 (CET)
  - Summer (DST): UTC+02:00 (CEST)
- Post Code: 4647 Brennåsen

Volleberg is a village in Kristiansand Municipality in Agder county, Norway. The village is located along the river Songdalselva. The European route E39 highway passes by the village on its way from Nodeland and Brennåsen about 1 to 2 kilometres (0.62 to 1.24 mi) to the north and Tangvall about 3.5 kilometres (2.2 mi) to the south. The village is primarily a residential community with people working in the nearby urban areas of Kristiansand and Søgne.

The 0.3-square-kilometre (74-acre) village has a population (2025) of 580 and a population density of 1,933 inhabitants per square kilometre (5,010/sq mi).

== History ==
The village was located in Songdalen Municipality (right along the border with Søgne Municipality) until 2020 when both of those municipalities were merged into Kristiansand Municipality.
