= Vennesla Station =

Railway station in Vennesla, Norway

Vennesla
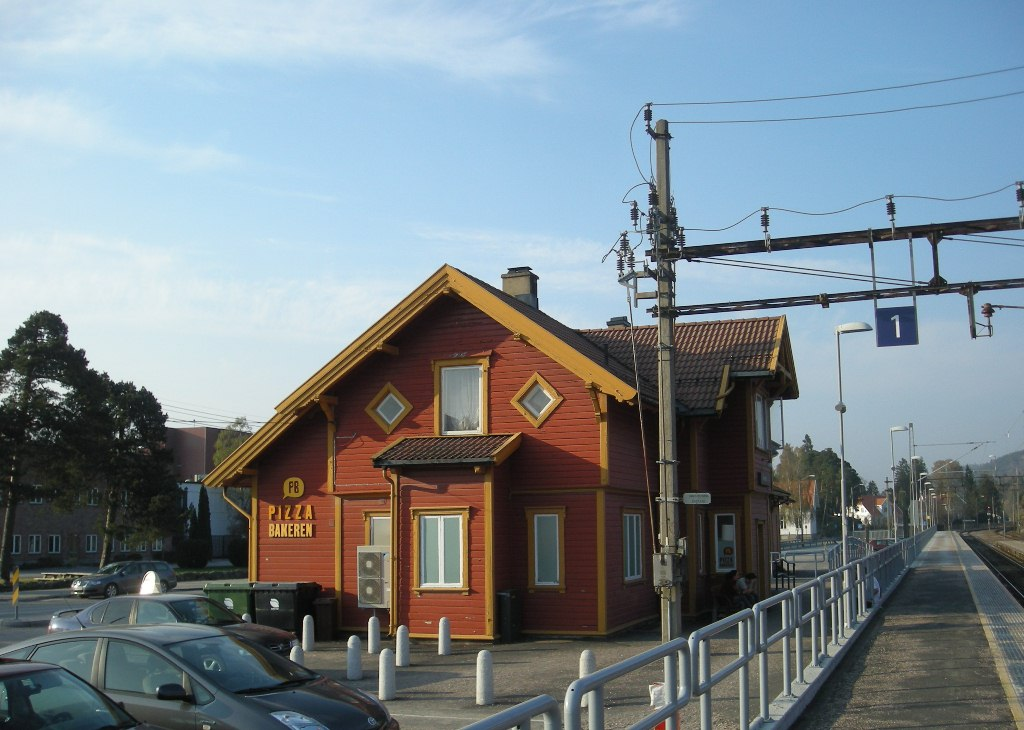

General information
- Location: Vennesla, Vennesla Municipality; Norway
- Coordinates: 58°15′11.42″N 7°58′4.36″E
- Elevation: 141.1 m (463 ft) AMSL
- Owner: Bane NOR
- Operator: Go-Ahead
- Line: Sørlandet Line
- Distance: 350.16 km (217.58 mi)

Other information
- Station code: VNL

History
- Opened: 1895
Location

Vennesla Station (Norwegian: Vennesla stasjon) is a railway station located in the village of Vennesla in Vennesla Municipality in Agder county, Norway. Located along the Sørlandet Line, the station is served by express trains to Oslo and Kristiansand. The trains are operated by Go-Ahead Norge.

== History ==
The station was opened in 1895 as part of the Setesdal Line. In 1935 it became part of Sørlandet Line when it was extended from Neslandsvatn Station to Kristiansand Station. The Setesdal Line has since closed and has been converted to a heritage railway.

Preceding station	Express trains	Following station
Kristiansand towards Stavanger	F5	Nelaug towards Oslo S
