= Nodelandsheia =

Village in Kristiansand Municipality, Norway

- Village
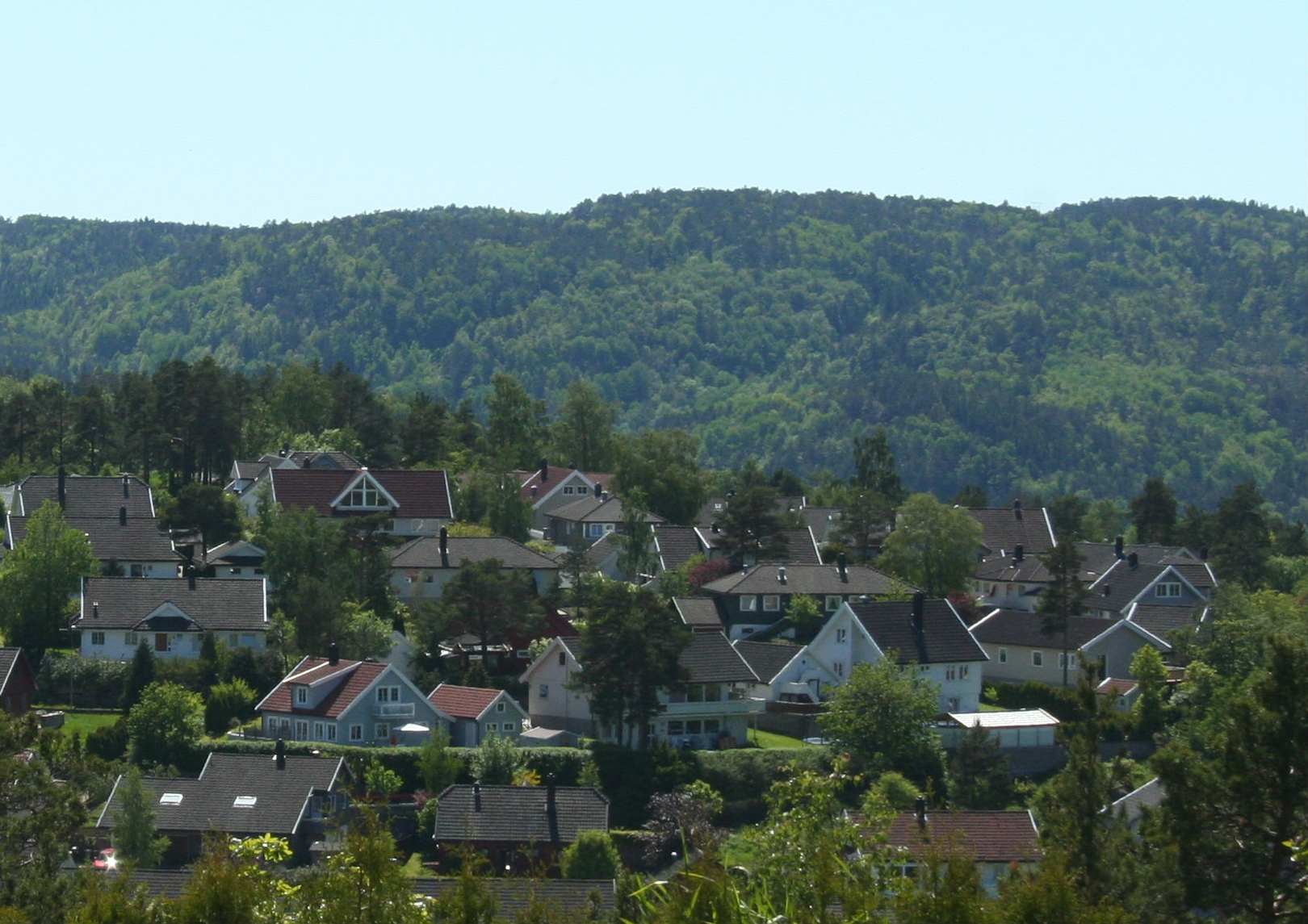
- View of the village
- Interactive map of Nodelandsheia
- Coordinates: 58.1676°N 7.85016°E
- Country: Norway
- Region: Southern Norway
- County: Agder
- Municipality: Kristiansand

Area
  - Total: 0.5 km^{2} (0.19 sq mi)
- Elevation: 134 m (440 ft)

Population (2015)
  - Total: 1,330
  - Density: 2,660/km^{2} (6,900/sq mi)
- Time zone: UTC+01:00 (CET)
  - Summer (DST): UTC+02:00 (CEST)
- Post Code: 4645 Nodeland

Nodelandsheia is a village in Kristiansand Municipality in Agder county, Norway. The village is located in the hills a short distance to the northeast of the village of Nodeland. The village is primarily residential, with most residents working in the nearby urban areas of Kristiansand and Søgne.

The 0.5-square-kilometre (120-acre) village had a population (2015) of 1,330 and a population density of 2,660 inhabitants per square kilometre (6,900/sq mi). Since 2015, the population and area data for this village area has not been separately tracked by Statistics Norway. It is now considered part of the "Nodeland-Brennåsen" urban area which includes the neighboring villages of Nodeland and Brennåsen
