= Finsland =

Village in Kristiansand Municipality, Norway

Finsland Finnsland
- Village
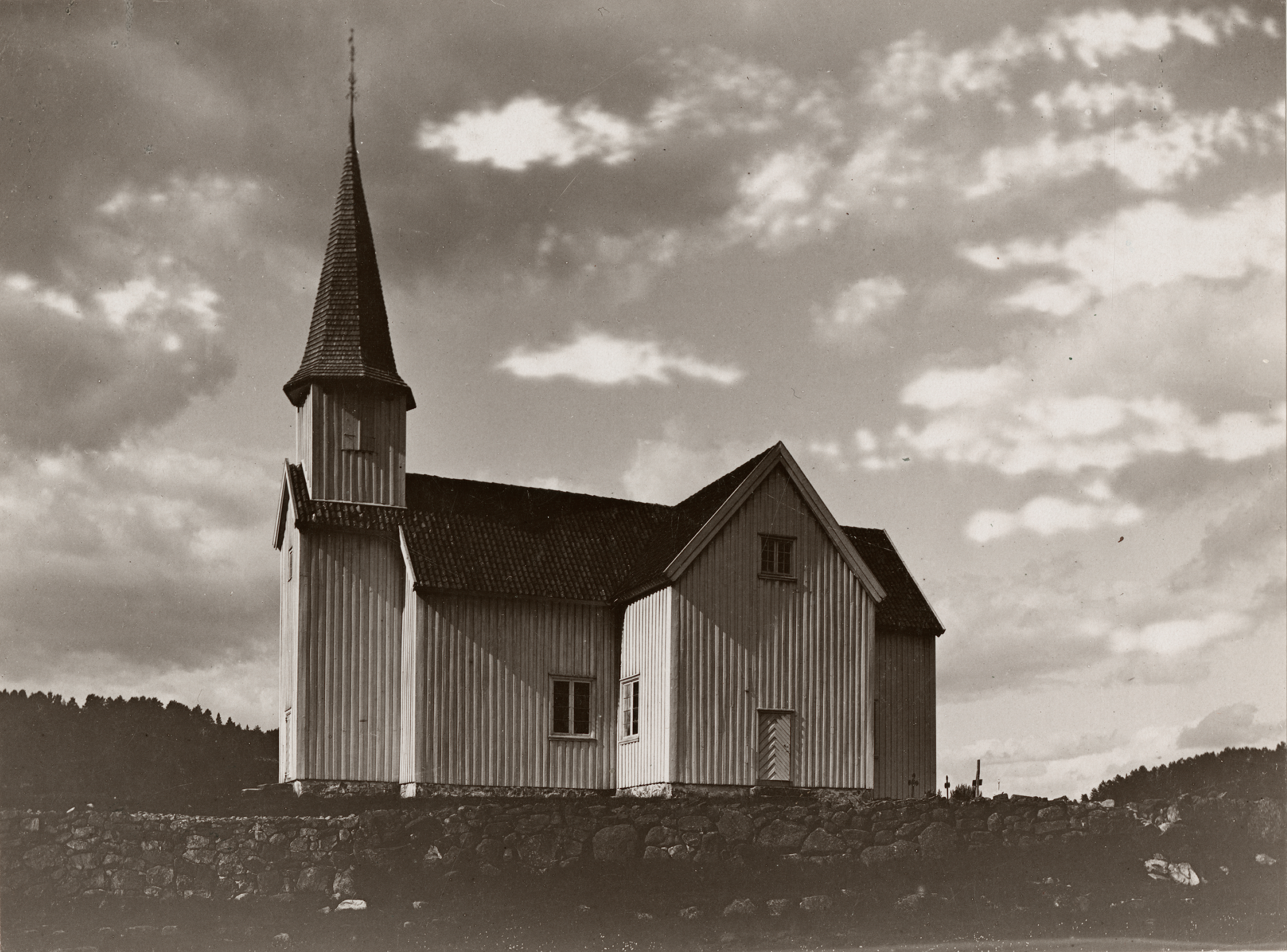
- View of the village church (c. 1900)
- Interactive map of Finsland
- Coordinates: 58.31856°N 7.59278°E
- Country: Norway
- Region: Southern Norway
- County: Agder
- Municipality: Kristiansand Municipality
- Elevation: 264 m (866 ft)
- Time zone: UTC+01:00 (CET)
  - Summer (DST): UTC+02:00 (CEST)
- Post Code: 4646 Finsland

Finsland is a village in Kristiansand Municipality in Agder county, Norway. The village is located about 25 kilometres (16 mi) northwest of the village of Nodeland and about 8 kilometres (5.0 mi) southeast of the village of Bjelland. The village is very small and it is located in a very rural area, but it is the site of Finsland Church.

== History ==
The village was the administrative centre of the old Finsland Municipality which existed from 1838 until its dissolution in 1964 when it became part of Songdalen Municipality. In 2020, it became part of Kristiansand Municipality.

=== Name ===
The municipality (originally the parish) was named Finsland. The name comes from the old "Finsland" farm which is situated by the river Finnsåna, which flows into the Mandalselva. There are also farms nearby called Finsdal and Finsådal. The first element is the word finne means "wilderness" or "remote". The second element land is the same as the word for "land".
