= Brennåsen =

Village in Kristiansand Municipality, Norway

- Village
- Interactive map of Brennåsen
- Coordinates: 58.13881°N 7.85736°E
- Country: Norway
- Region: Southern Norway
- County: Agder
- Municipality: Kristiansand Municipality

Area
  - Total: 1.23 km^{2} (0.47 sq mi)
- Elevation: 20 m (66 ft)

Population (2019)
  - Total: 588
  - Density: 478/km^{2} (1,240/sq mi)
- Time zone: UTC+01:00 (CET)
  - Summer (DST): UTC+02:00 (CEST)
- Post Code: 4647 Brennåsen

Brennåsen is a village in Kristiansand Municipality in Agder county, Norway. The village is located along the river Songdalselva, about 2 kilometres (1.2 mi) southeast of the village of Nodeland and about 1.5 kilometres (0.93 mi) north of the village of Volleberg. The European route E39 highway passes through Brennåsen as it travels between the cities of Kristiansand and Stavanger. The village has a shopping centre, post office, school, and gas station.

The 1.23-square-kilometre (300-acre) village had a population (2019) of 588 and a population density of 478 inhabitants per square kilometre (1,240/sq mi). Since 2019, the population and area data for this village area has not been separately tracked by Statistics Norway. It is now tracked as part of "Nodeland-Brennåsen" since the neighboring village of Nodeland has grown together with Brennåsen to form one urban area.

== History ==
The village was part of Songdalen Municipality prior to 2020 when that municipality was merged into Kristiansand Municipality.
