= Arild Sibbern =

Norwegian military officer

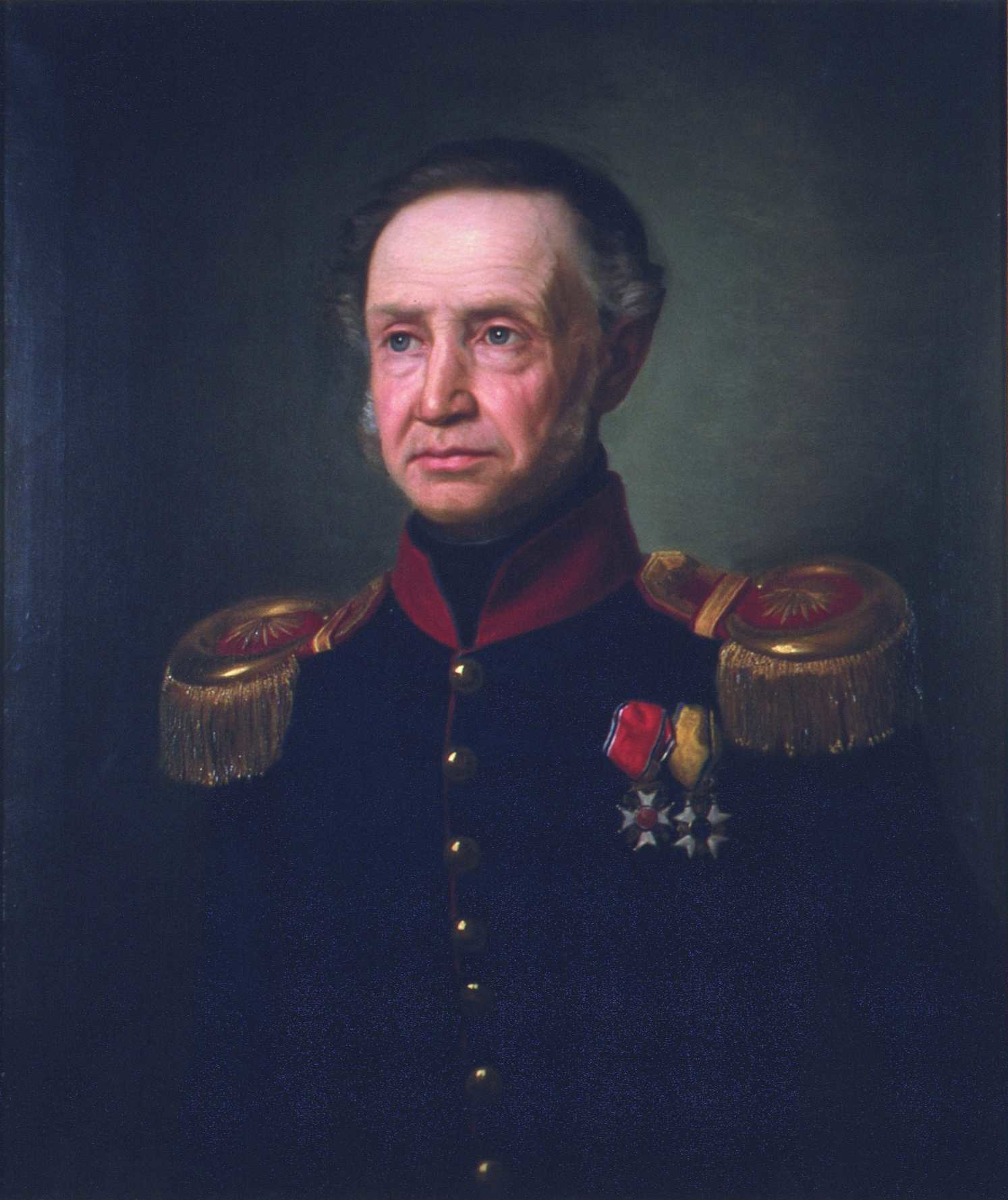
- Henrik Frederik Arild Sibbern
- Born: 27 June 1785; Rygge, Norway
- Died: 11 April 1863 (aged 77)
- Occupation: Military officer
- Known for: Member of the Norwegian Constituent Assembly in 1814

Arild Sibbern (27 June 1785 – 11 April 1863) was a Norwegian military officer and representative at the Norwegian Constituent Assembly.

Henrik Frederik Arild Sibbern was born in Rygge in Østfold, Norway. He was admitted to the Royal Danish Military Academy (Hærens Officersskole) in Copenhagen during 1800, and became a military officer in 1803. In 1805, he was commissioned as a teacher at the Army Officers Academ. In 1807, he was promoted to second lieutenant and assigned to the Royal Regiment stationed in Helsingor, Denmark. From 1811 to 1814, he served in Trondheim, Norway. In 1814 he was assigned to the Norwegian Engineer Brigade in Kristiansand. He represented the Engineering Brigade at the Norwegian Constituent Assembly in Eidsvoll during 1814.

== Personal life ==
He was married to Maren Dorothea Steensen (1798- 1855) with whom he had three children. His family included his brother, Norwegian government minister Valentin Christian Wilhelm Sibbern and his nephew, Norwegian Prime Minister Georg Sibbern.

== Honors ==
- Order of St. Olav
- Order of the North Star
- Order of the Sword
