= Nodeland Station =

Railway station in Kristiansand, Norway

Nodeland
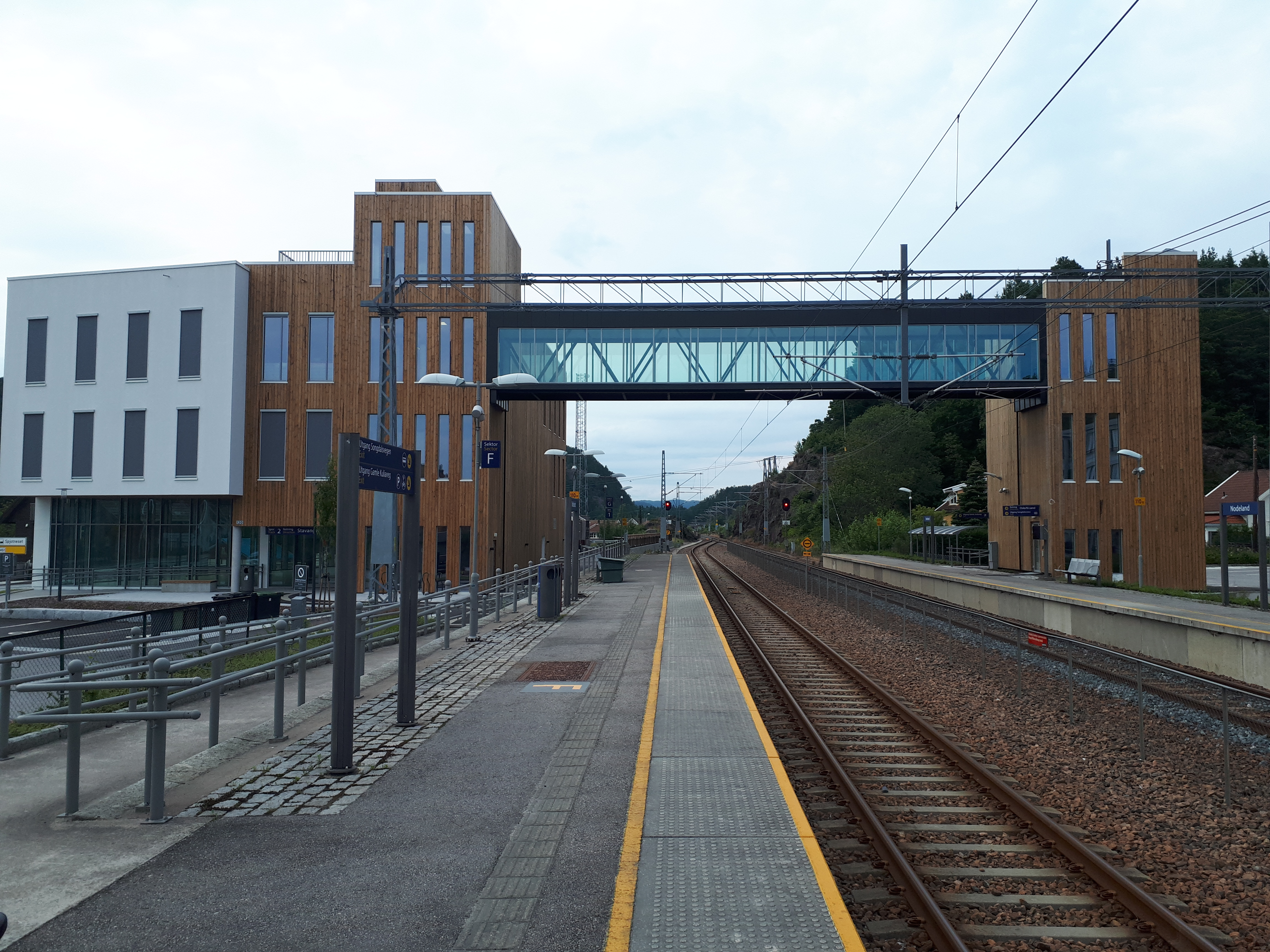

General information
- Location: Nodeland, Kristiansand Municipality; Norway
- Coordinates: 58°9′27″N 7°50′5″E
- Elevation: 25 m (82 ft) AMSL
- Owner: Bane NOR
- Operator: Go-Ahead Norge
- Line: Sørlandet Line
- Distance: 375.29 km (233.19 mi)
- Platforms: 2 side platforms
- Tracks: 2

Construction
- Parking: 80 spaces
- Cycle facilities: 42 spaces
- Accessible: Yes
- Architect: NSB Arkitektkontor

Other information
- Station code: NDL

History
- Opened: 17 December 1943

Passengers
- 10,300 (annually)
Location

Nodeland Station (Norwegian: Nodeland stasjon) is a railway station of the Sørlandet Line situated in the village of Nodeland in Kristiansand Municipality in Agder county, Norway. Located 375.29 kilometers (233.19 mi) from Oslo Central Station, it is served by long-distance trains operated by Go-Ahead Norge. In addition to intercity services to Oslo and Stavanger, the eight daily trains in each direction serve as a commuter link to Kristiansand, located nine minutes away. The station features two side platforms and a station building.

The station was opened on 17 December 1943 as part of the segment of the Sørlandet Line between Kristiansand and Sira. The line past the station was electrified from 1946 and the station automated in 1969. The following year the station became unstaffed. A major upgrade in 2012 saw the lengthening of the passing loop to 718 meters (2,356 ft), new platforms and increased parking. Nodeland had 10,300 passengers in 2008.

== History ==
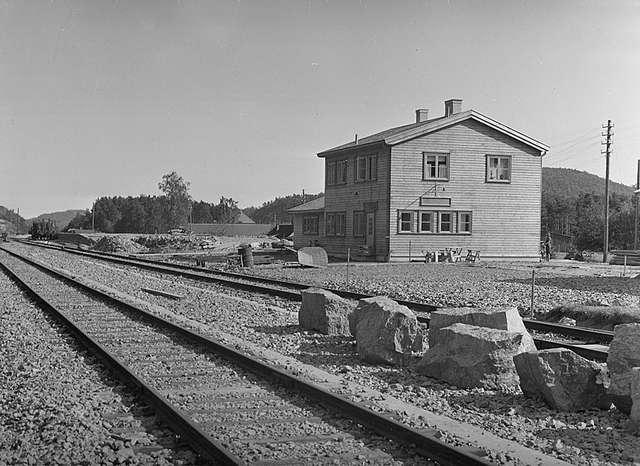
Nodeland Station on 7 July 1942, imminently before its opening

The station was built during the Second World War under the German-administrated expansion of the Sørlandet Line west of Kristiansand. The station building was completed in 1942 after designs by NSB Arkitektkontor. It was originally proposed to be named Nodelandsmoen, but this was changed to Nodeland. Irregular revenue traffic commenced on the line on 17 December 1943 and the station became operative from the same day. Ordinary traffic commenced on 1 March 1944. Electric traction was not introduced until 16 May 1946, as part of the electrification from Marnardal Station to Kristiansand Station. An interlocking system became operational on 9 October 1969, allowing the station to become remotely controlled from 19 November 1969. The station became unstaffed from 1 June 1970.

Due to low patronage Nodeland Station was closed in 2000, although it reopened in 2003. The first dense redevelopment started in 2006, when a 27-apartment complex with a mini-mall opened. It was followed up by a series of other apartment complexes. The line west of Kristiansand experienced a major growth in commuter traffic in the 2000s, including ridership from Nodeland. However, the station was in poor condition. The platform was only 70 meters (230 ft) long and only served a few of the carriages. Passengers would regularly disembark to a location without a platform. The passing loop was 420 meters (1,380 ft), too short for longer freight trains.

The Norwegian National Rail Administration therefore started a full renovation of the station in 2011. The two main components consisted of extending the passing loop to allow two 600-meter (2,000 ft) freight trains to pass, and replace the former island platform with new 220-meter (720 ft) side platforms. Extension of the passing loop was done to the west side of the station. This included building a new, parallel 15 meters (49 ft) bridge over Kuliaveien. Parking was improved, increasing from ten to fifty places. The new station was officially opened by Minister of Transport and Communications Magnhild Meltveit Kleppa. The upgrades cost NOK 150 million. The only aspect which was not built was an overpass.

== Facilities ==
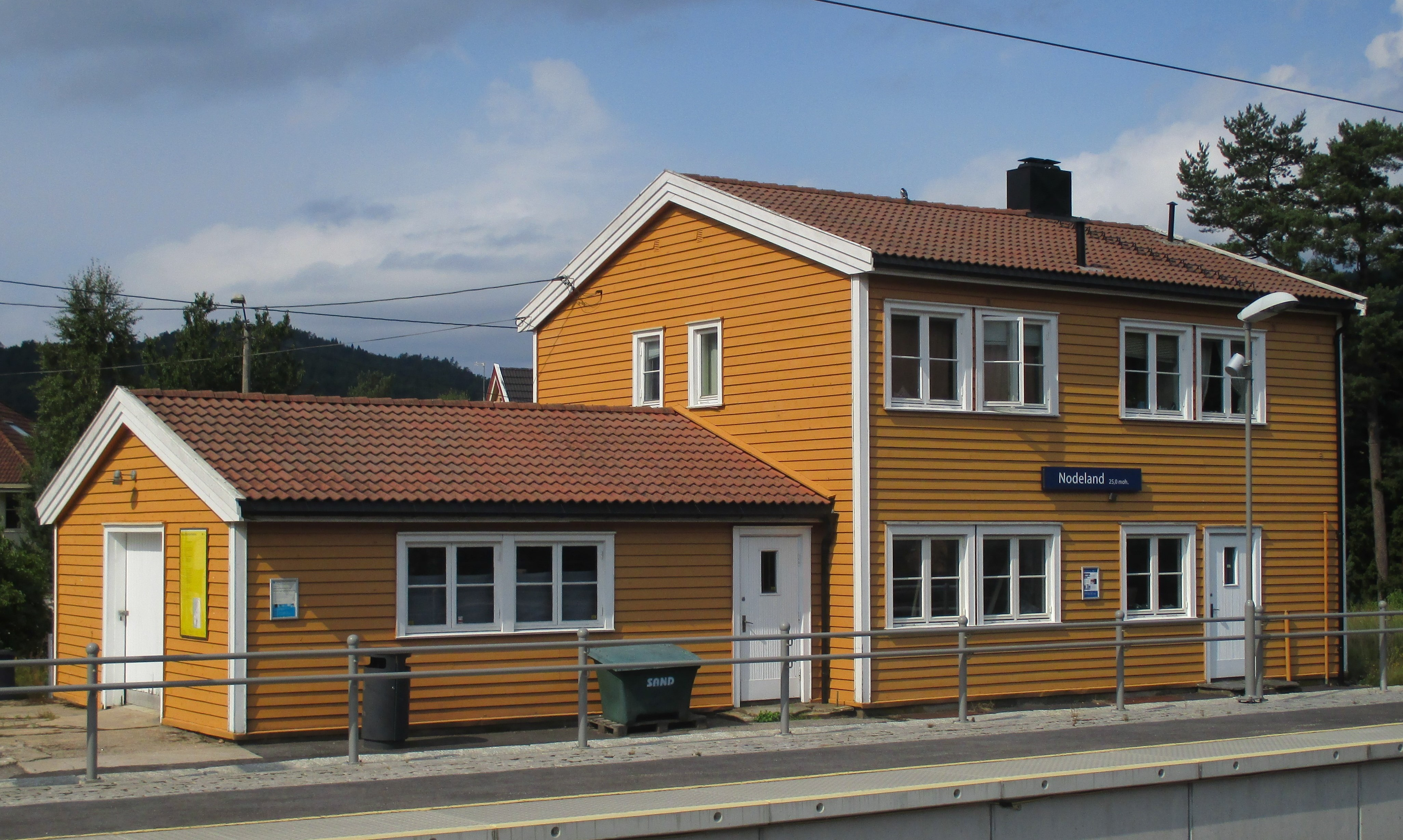
The station building in 2014

Nodeland Station is on the Sørlandet Line, located 375.29 kilometers (233.19 mi) from Oslo Central Station at an elevation of 176.9 meters (580 ft) above mean sea level. The station features a 718-meter (2,356 ft) passing loop. There are two side platforms, both 220 meters (720 ft) long and 76 centimeters (30 in) tall. There is a waiting shed on both sides. Track 1 normally serves eastbound trains towards Kristiansand and Oslo, while track 2 serves westbound trains towards Stavanger.

Along track 2 there is roofed parking for 42 bicycles and free parking for 47 cars, including two electric vehicle charging stations. Including the parking on the track 1 side, this brings the parking capacity to 80 cars. Both platforms have stairs down to Kuliaveien, on the eastern end of the platforms. Access between the platforms is via this street.

Like the other stations along the Sørlandet Line, the station building at Nodeland received a standardized design. It was built in the overall Neoclassical architecture style adapted in the 1920s. By the 1940s the designs had been altered to include elements of functionalism. It has siding of weatherboard.

== Services ==
The station is served by long-distance trains operated by Go-Ahead, counting eight daily services on weekdays, including a night train service. These operate from Oslo via Kristiansand to Stavanger. Songdalen is a suburb of Kristiansand and 69 percent of the municipality's workforce commutes to the city. The train uses nine minutes to Kristiansand Station. Driving time by car is about fifteen minutes, although significantly longer during rush-hour. The station had 10,300 annual passengers in 2008. There are bus services which connect to surrounding areas.

Preceding station	Express trains	Following station
Breland towards Stavanger	F5	Kristiansand towards Oslo S
Marnardal towards Stavanger	F5	Kristiansand towards Oslo S
