= Greipstad Church =

Church in Agder, Norway

- Greipstad kirke
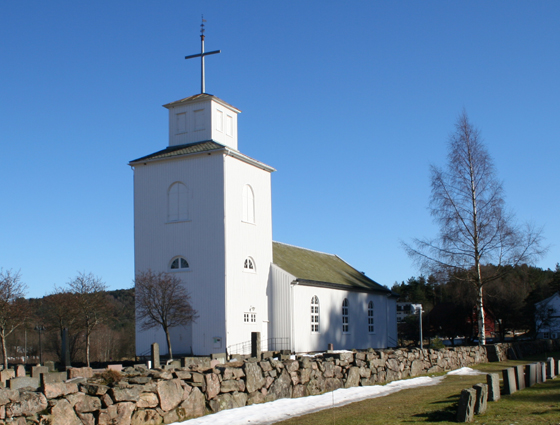
- View of the church
- Greipstad Church
- 58.152879°N 07.827706°E
- Location: Kristiansand Municipality, Agder
- Country: Norway
- Denomination: Church of Norway
- Previous denomination: Catholic Church
- Churchmanship: Evangelical Lutheran

History
- Status: Parish church
- Founded: Middle Ages
- Consecrated: February 8, 1829 (197 years ago)

Architecture
- Functional status: Active
- Architect: Arild Sibbern
- Architectural type: Rectangular
- Style: Empire
- Completed: 1828 (198 years ago)

Specifications
- Capacity: 330
- Materials: Wood

Administration
- Diocese: Agder og Telemark
- Deanery: Kristiansand domprosti
- Parish: Greipstad
- Norwegian Cultural Heritage Site
- Type: Church
- Status: Automatically protected
- ID: 84416

Greipstad Church (Norwegian: Greipstad kirke) is a parish church of the Church of Norway in Kristiansand Municipality in Agder county, Norway. It is located in the village of Nodeland. It is the church for the Greipstad parish which is part of the Kristiansand domprosti (arch-deanery) in the Diocese of Agder og Telemark. The white, wooden church was built in a rectangular design in 1829 using plans drawn up by the architect Arild Sibbern. It was built in the empire style. The church seats about 330 people.

== History ==
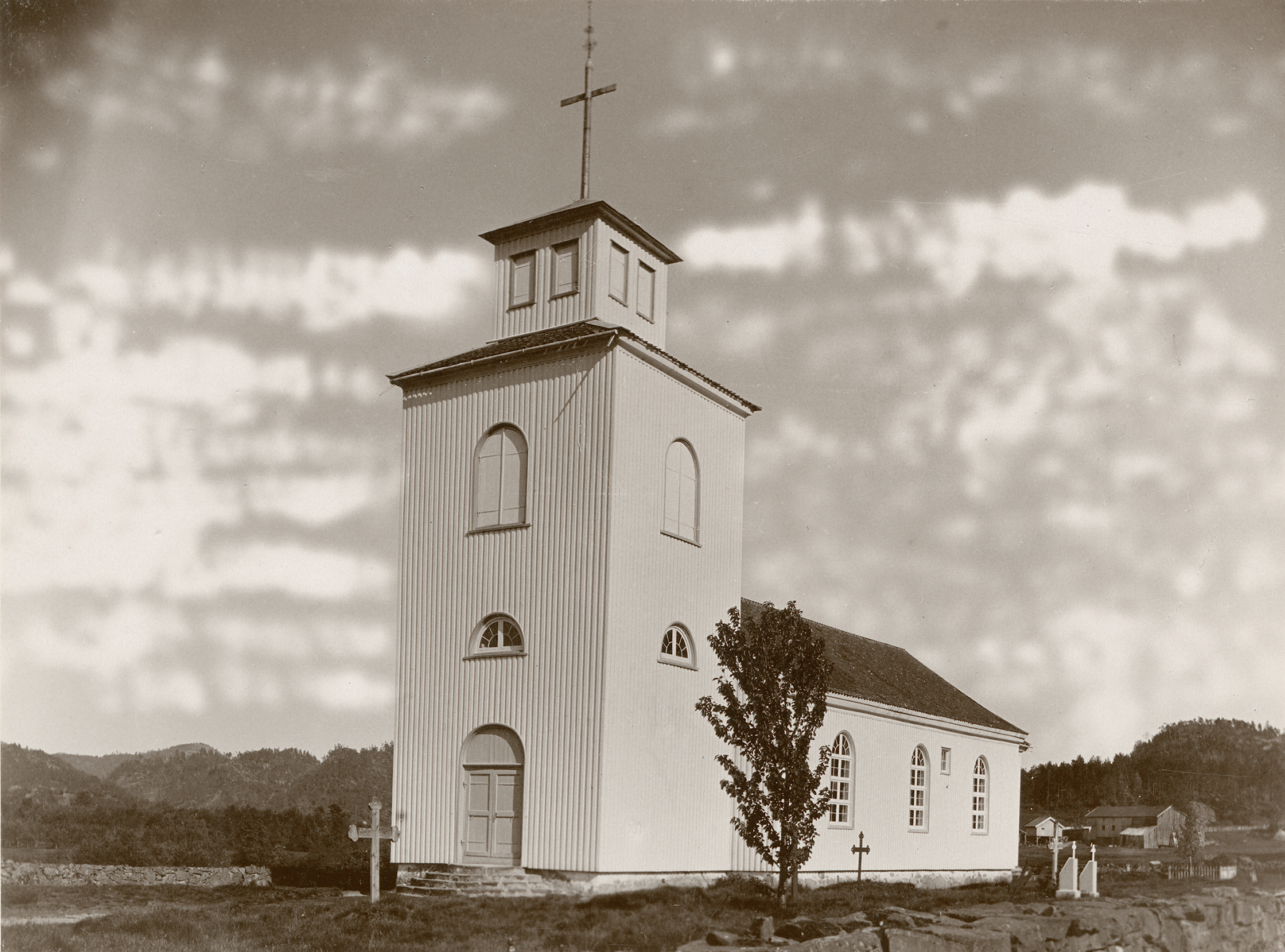
View of the church (c. 1900).

The earliest existing historical records of the church date to the year 1516, but the church was old at that time. The old stave church was torn down and replaced with a new building around the year 1550. Not much is known about that church. In 1737, the old church was torn down and replaced with a new building. By the 1820s, the old church was getting too small, so plans were made for a new church. The new church was designed by Arild Sibbern and construction was completed in 1828. The new building was consecrated on 8 February 1829 by the priest Fabritius.

== See also ==
- List of churches in Agder og Telemark
