= Finsland Church =

Church in Agder, Norway

- Finsland kirke
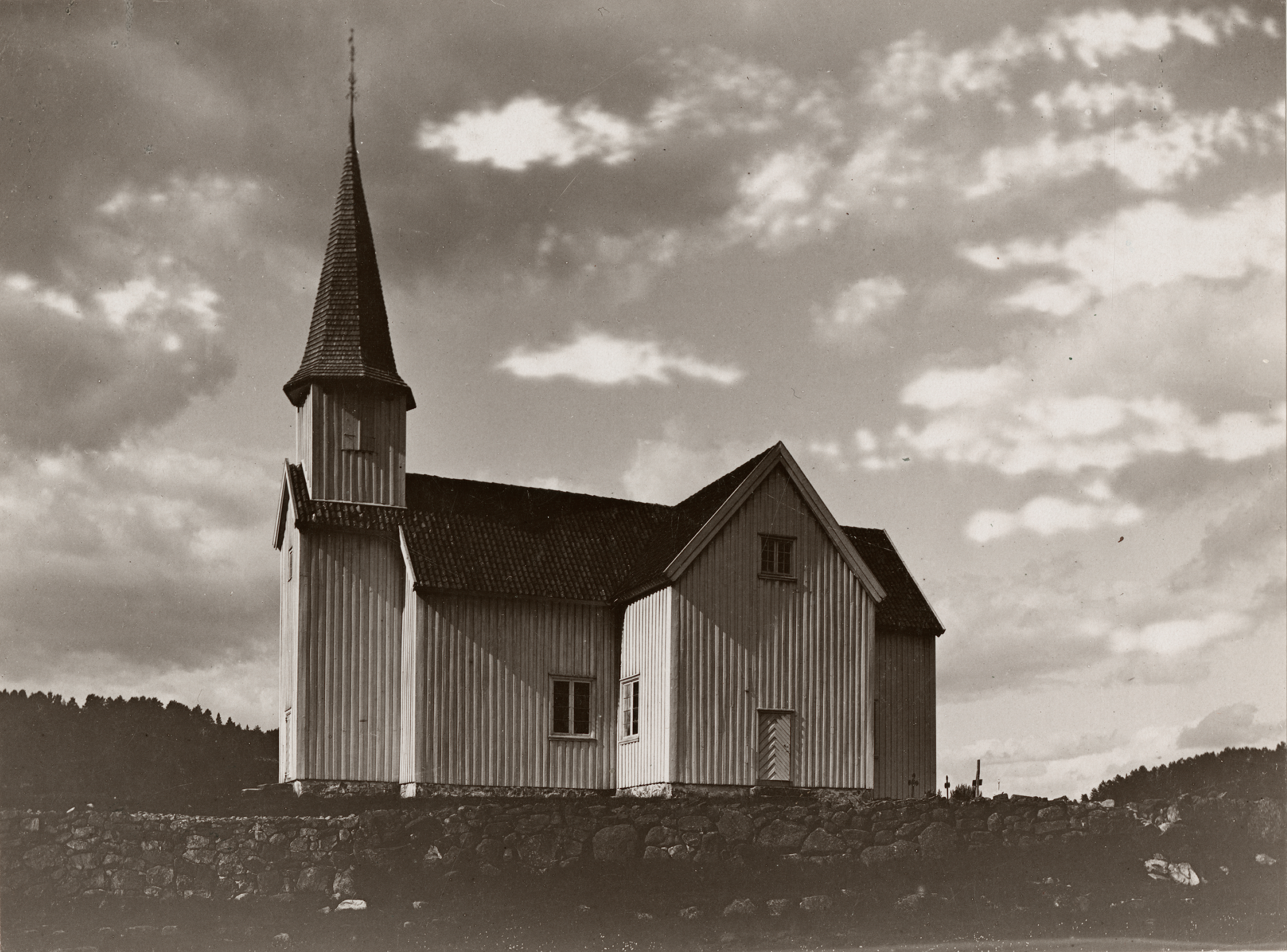
- View of the church
- Finsland Church
- 58.3156°N 07.5905°E
- Location: Kristiansand Municipality, Agder
- Country: Norway
- Denomination: Church of Norway
- Previous denomination: Catholic Church
- Churchmanship: Evangelical Lutheran

History
- Status: Parish church
- Founded: Middle Ages
- Consecrated: 1812

Architecture
- Functional status: Active
- Architectural type: Cruciform
- Completed: 1803 (223 years ago)

Specifications
- Capacity: 250
- Materials: Wood

Administration
- Diocese: Agder og Telemark
- Deanery: Kristiansand domprosti
- Parish: Finsland
- Norwegian Cultural Heritage Site
- Type: Church
- Status: Automatically protected
- ID: 84138

Finsland Church (Norwegian: Finsland kirke) is a parish church of the Church of Norway in Kristiansand Municipality in Agder county, Norway. It is located in the village of Finsland. It is the church for the Finsland parish which is part of the Kristiansand domprosti (arch-deanery) in the Diocese of Agder og Telemark. The white, wooden church was built in a cruciform design in 1803 using plans drawn up by an unknown architect. The church seats about 250 people.

== History ==
The earliest existing historical records of the church date to the year 1620, but the church was likely old at that time. The church was first built during the Middle Ages. In 1749, the old church was torn down and a new church was completed in 1751. The new church was built a little south of the old church site. Unfortunately, the new location was not good due to unstable soil, and after about 50 years, the church was torn down in 1803. After doing quite a bit of site preparation and leveling of the ground, a new church was built a little to the west of the previous church site. The new church was completed in 1803, but it was not consecrated until 1812.

== See also ==
- List of churches in Agder og Telemark
