= Kristiansand station =

Rail station in Norway

Kristiansand Station
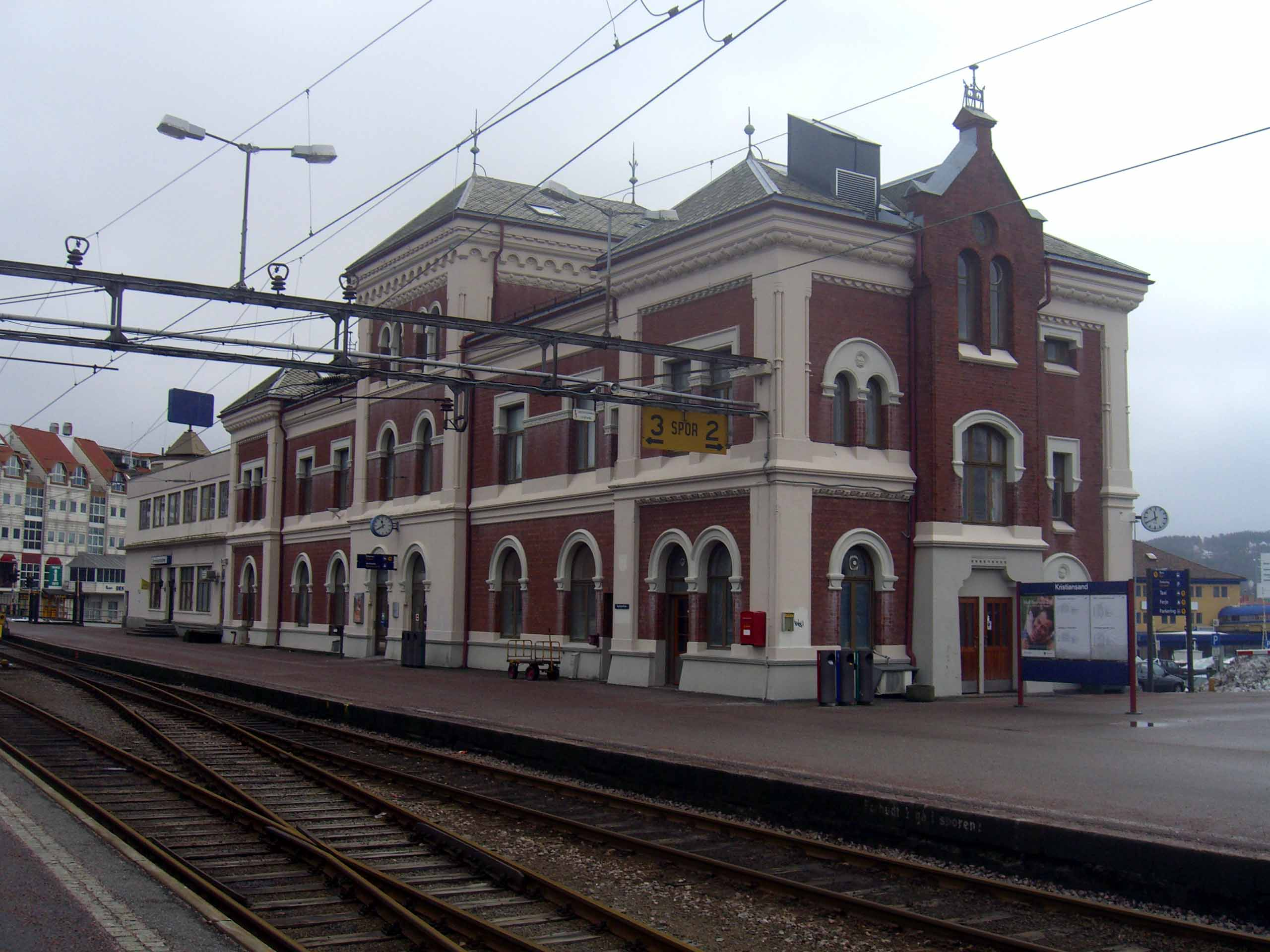

General information
- Location: Kristiansand, Kristiansand Municipality; Norway
- Coordinates: 58°08′44″N 7°59′16″E
- Elevation: 5.5 m (18 ft) AMSL
- Owner: Bane NOR
- Operator: Go-Ahead Norge
- Line: Sørlandet Line
- Distance: 365.29 km (226.98 mi)
- Connections: Bus: AKT; Ferry to Denmark nearby

Construction
- Architect: Paul Due

Other information
- Station code: KRS

History
- Opened: 1895
Location

Kristiansand Station (Norwegian: Kristiansand stasjon) (IATA: XKR) is a railway station located in the centre of the city of Kristiansand in Kristiansand Municipality in Agder county, Norway. The station, located along the Sørlandet Line, is served by regional trains to Oslo and Stavanger. Kristiansand Station is a cul-de-sac station, requiring all trains to change direction at the station. The station is owned by the state-owned company Bane NOR.

== History ==
The station was opened in 1895 as part of the now abandoned Setesdal Line from Kristiansand to Byglandsfjord. The station was the only station on the line to be built with bricks, due to local regulations after the city fire in 1892. Like all other stations on the line, the station was designed by Paul Due.

In 1937, Norsk Spisevognselskap agreed to take over operations of the restaurant when the Sørland Line was completed to Kristiansand. Operations started on 16 June 1938, a week before the line opened. On 9 December 1940, the company decided to invest 100,000 kr in a new restaurant building at the station. It was taken into use on 28 November 1942.

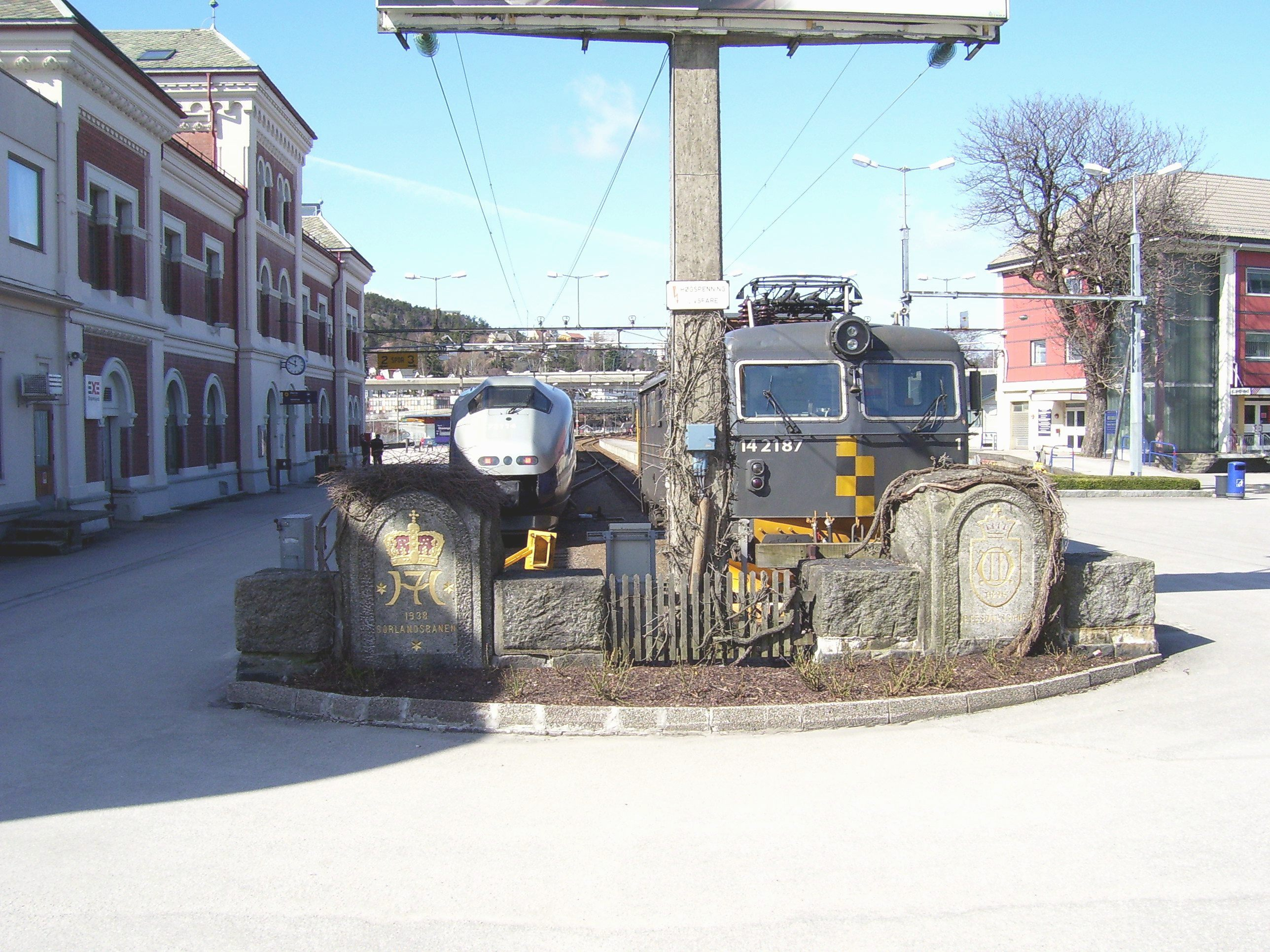
Class 73 and El 14 at Kristiansand Station

Preceding station	Express trains	Following station
Nodeland towards Stavanger	F5	Vennesla towards Oslo S
