= Nodeland =

Village in Kristiansand Municipality, Norway

- Village
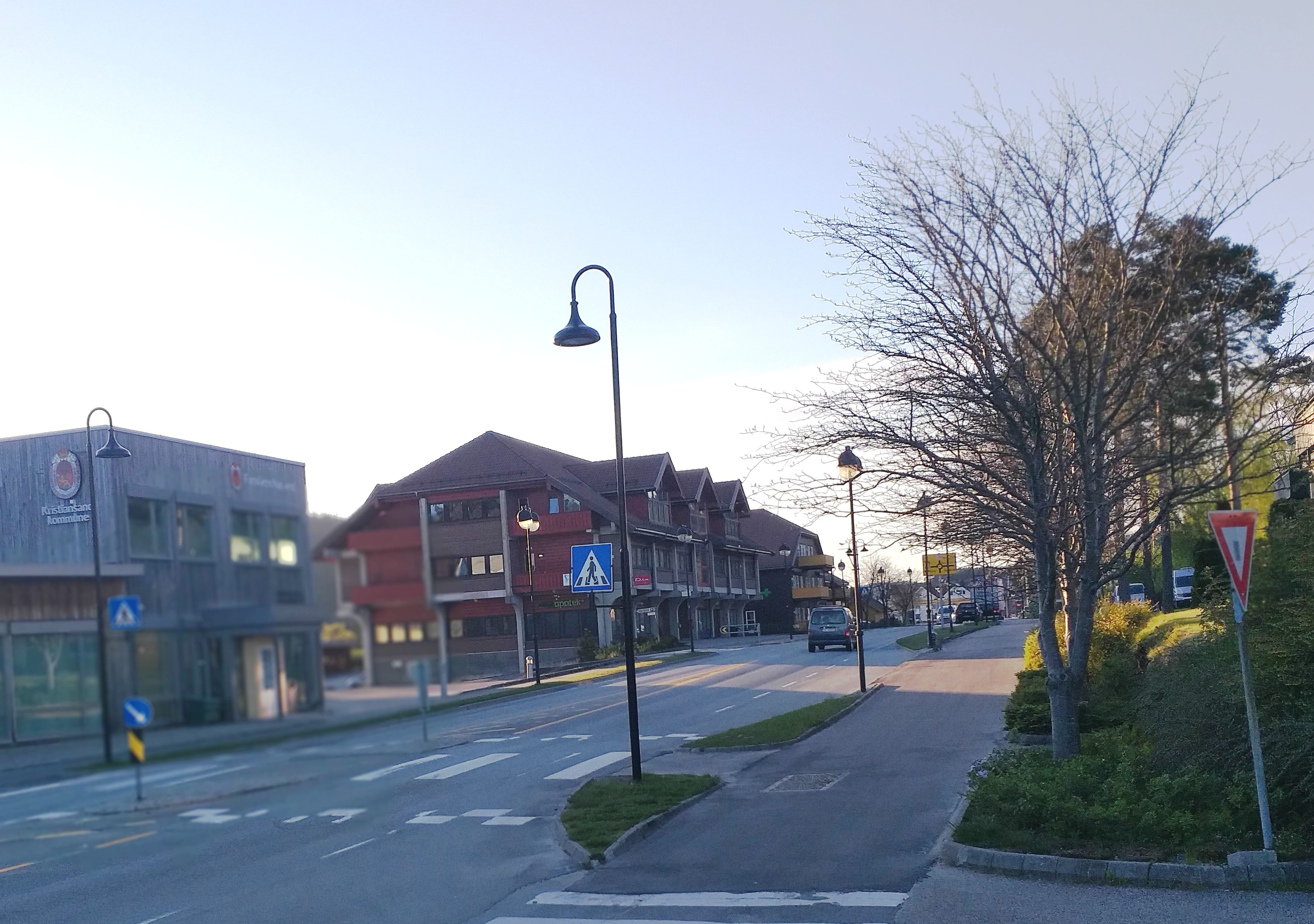
- View of the village
- Interactive map of Nodeland
- Coordinates: 58.15515°N 7.83582°E
- Country: Norway
- Region: Southern Norway
- County: Agder
- Municipality: Kristiansand Municipality

Area
  - Total: 1.94 km^{2} (0.75 sq mi)
- Elevation: 23 m (75 ft)

Population (2019)
  - Total: 3,840
  - Density: 1,979/km^{2} (5,130/sq mi)
- Time zone: UTC+01:00 (CET)
  - Summer (DST): UTC+02:00 (CEST)
- Post Code: 4645 Nodeland

Nodeland is a village in Kristiansand Municipality in Agder County, Norway. The village is located about 10 kilometres (6.2 mi) northwest of the city center of Kristiansand. The village is surrounded by several smaller villages such as Nodelandsheia, Brennåsen, Volleberg, and Hortemo.

Nodeland Station is a railway station along the Sørlandet Line. All trains between Kristiansand and Stavanger (except overnight trains) stop in the village at this station. Greipstad Church is also located in Nodeland.

The 1.94-square-kilometre (480-acre) village had a population (2019) of 3,840 and a population density of 1,979 inhabitants per square kilometre (5,130/sq mi). Since 2019, the population and area data for this village area has not been separately tracked by Statistics Norway. It is now tracked as part of "Nodeland-Brennåsen" since the neighboring village of Brennåsen has grown together with Nodeland to form one urban area.

== History ==
The village of Nodeland was the administrative centre of the old Songdalen Municipality which existed until 2020 when it became part of Kristiansand Municipality.
