= Ekebergparken Sculpture Park =

Sculpture park in Oslo, Norway

Coordinates: 59°53′54″N 10°45′47″E

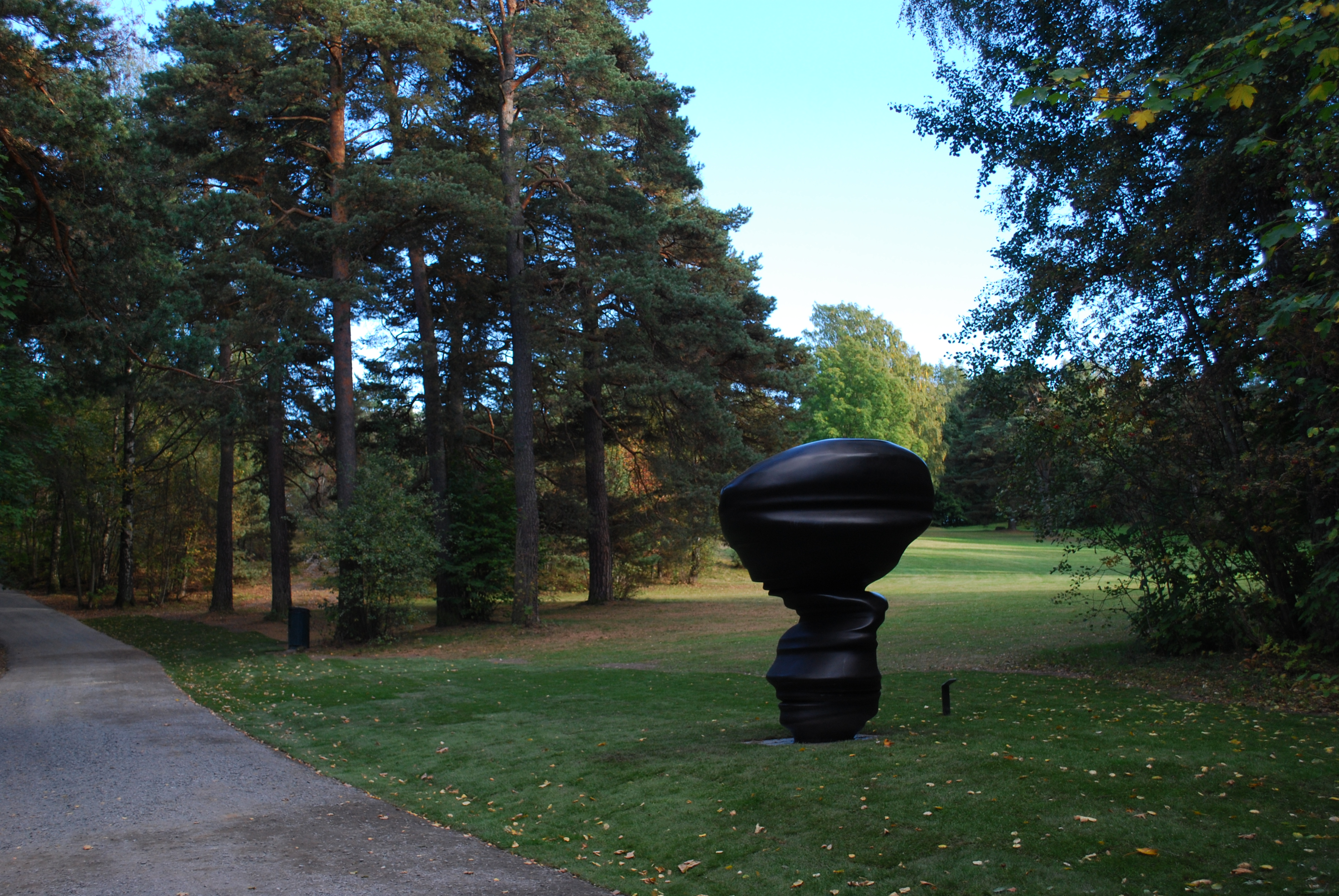
Walk in sculpture park by Cast Glances by Tony Cragg

Ekebergparken Sculpture Park is a sculpture park and a national heritage park close to Ekebergrestauranten with a panoramic view of the city at Ekeberg in the southeast of the city of Oslo, Norway.

The Sculpture Park has been initiated and financed by property director and art collector Christian Ringnes (born 1954). The park is located in a wooded area of 25.5 acres (about 10 hectares), and was inaugurated 26 September 2013.

A total of 31 sculptures were installed when the opening ceremony took place in 2013, many of them with women as subjects. The park is owned by the City of Oslo and sculptures owned by the Christian Ringnes instituted foundation, C Ludens Ringnes Foundation. It was fully established in February 2015, including accrued trails, water surface and at least 25 sculptures deployed. The capital of NOK 350 million was set aside at the time to cover purchases of additional sculptures, up to a total of eighty, and the operation of the park for at least 50 years.

== Museum ==
Adjacent to the sculpture park there is also an indoor museum (open every day 11 a.m. to 4 p.m.), located in Lunds Hus, which presents the Ekeberg area's history and nature. There is also an art and design shop that has books and design items. Lunds hus is a white villa from 1891 and a base of the Ekebergparken Sculpture Park.

== Works of art in Ekebergparken Sculpture Park ==
In 2019, the Ekebergparken Sculpture Park consisted of the following artworks:

- The Scream, 2013. Site specific performance, 2013, by Marina Abramović
- Indre rom VI. Livsløpet, stainless steel, by Per Inge Bjørlo
- Reflections, bronze, 2006, by Guy Buseyne
- Reclining Woman, bronze, by Fernando Botero
- Ace of diamonds III, stainless steel, 2004, by Lynn Chadwick
- Sturm und Drang, painted bronze, 2014, by Jake and Dinos Chapman
- Cast glances, bronze, 2002, by Tony Cragg
- The Dance, stainless steel, 2013, by George Cutts

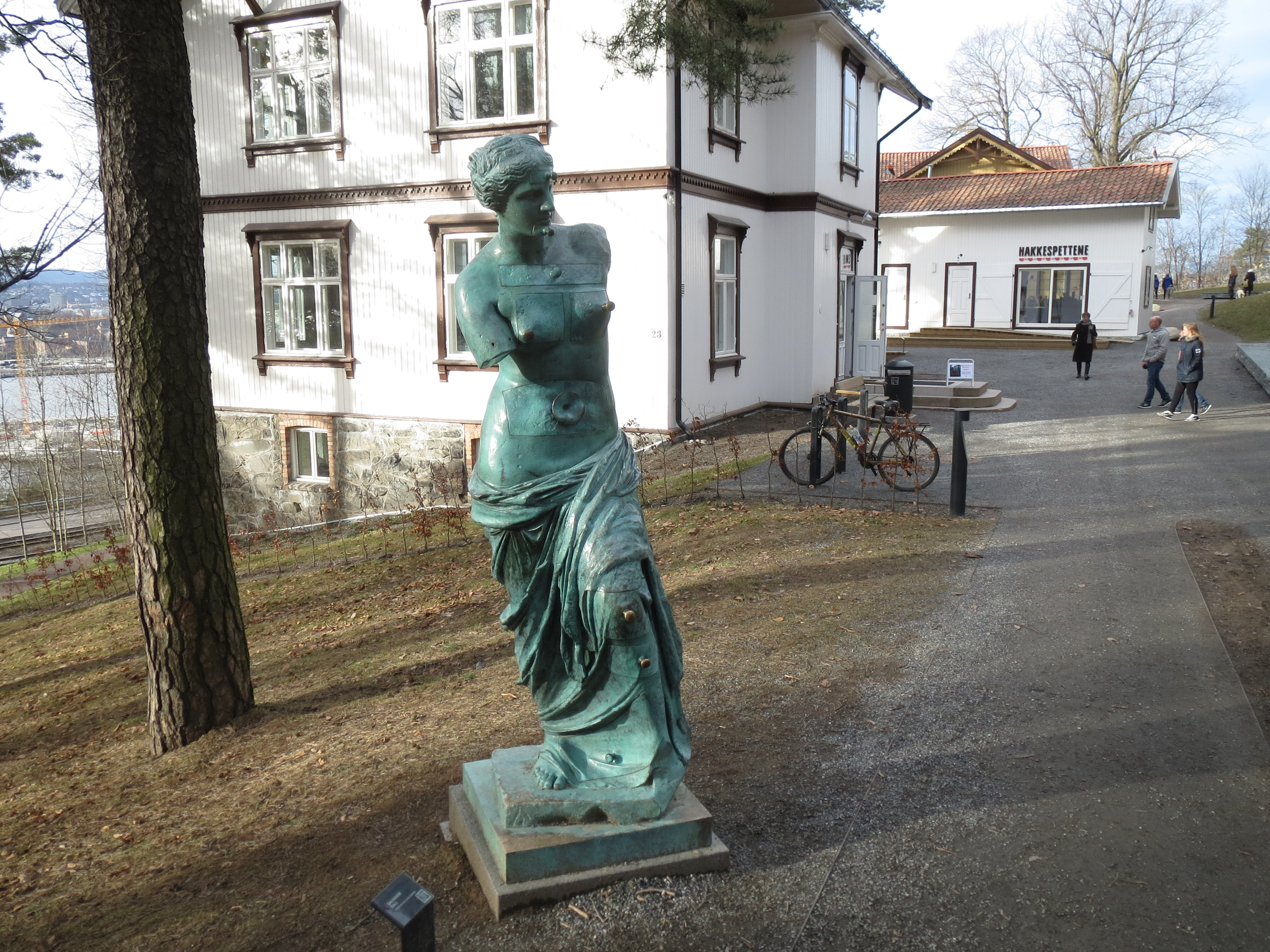
Salvador Dalí: Venus Milo aux tiroirs

- Venus Milo aux tiroirs, bronze, 1936, by Salvador Dalí
- Dilemma, bronze, 2017, by Elmgreen & Dragset

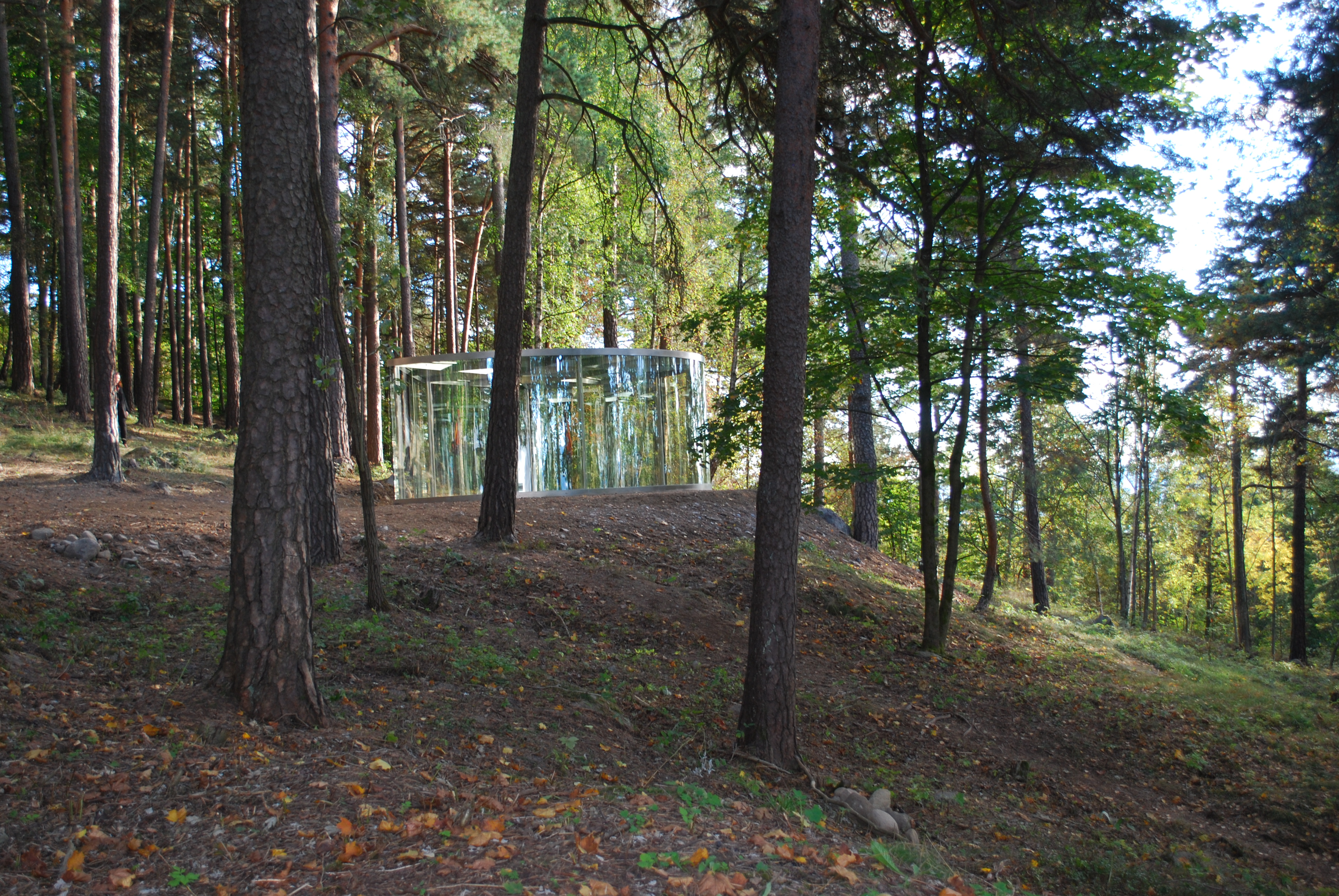
Dan Graham: Ekeberg Pavilion

- Ekeberg Pavillion, glass, stone and metal, 2013, by Dan Graham
- Walking Woman, bronze, 2010, by Sean Henry
- Anatomy of an Angel, marble, 2008, by Damien Hirst
- Stone carving, 2013, by Jenny Holzer
- Air Burial, by Roni Horn
- Marilyn, stainless steel, by Richard Hudson
- Levitating woman, bronze, 2012, by Matt Johnson
- Deep Cream Maradona, 2016, bronze, by Sarah Lucas
- Judith, bronze, 2017, by Markus Lüpertz
- Open Book, stainless steel, 2010, by Diane Maclean

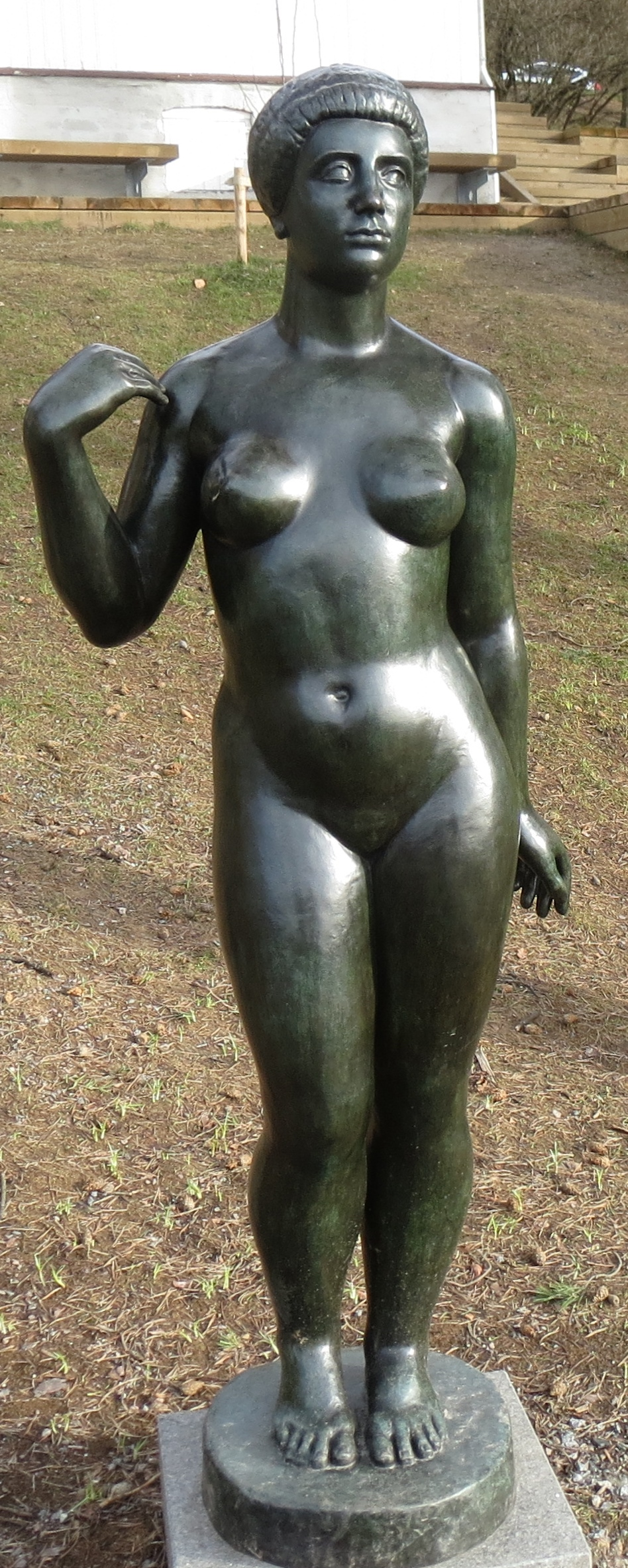
Aristide Maillol: Nue sans draperie

- Nue sans draperie, bronze, 1921, by Aristide Maillol

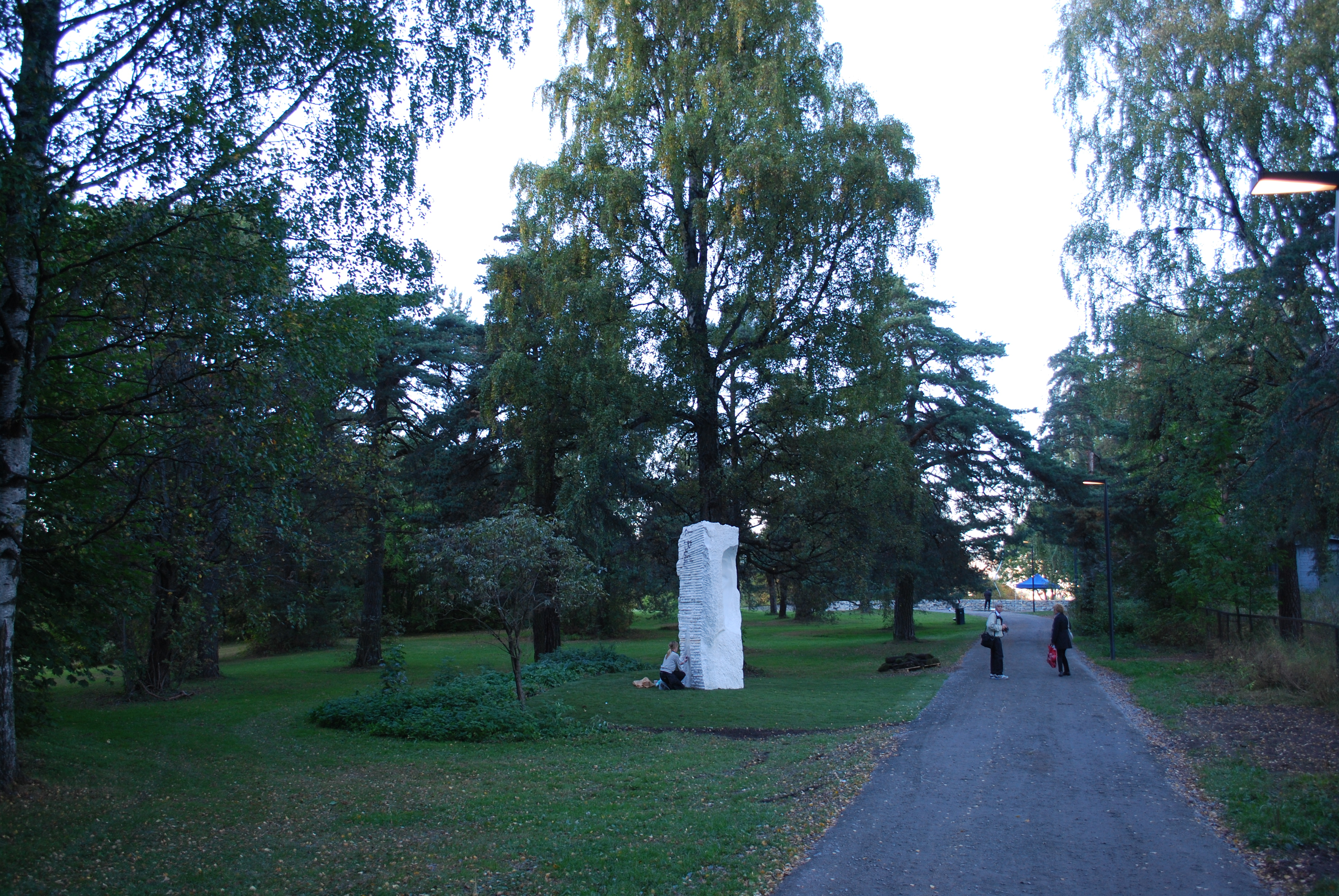
Walkway in Ekebergparken Sculpture Park with the Marble Sculpture "Konkavt ansikt" ("Concave Face") by the artist Hilde Mæhlum.

- Konkavt ansikt, marble, 2006, by Hilde Mæhlum
- Light projection, installation, 2010–13, by Tony Oursler
- Venus Victrix, bronze, 1914–16, by Auguste Renoir and Richard Guino
- La grande laveuse, bronze, 1917, by Auguste Renoir and Richard Guino
- Eva, bronze, 1881, by Auguste Rodin
- Cariatide tombée à l'urne, bronze, by Auguste Rodin
- Fideicommissum, bronze, 2002, by Ann-Sofi Sidén
- Drømmersken, marble, 1992, by Knut Steen
- Still life with landscape, stainless steel, 2011–12, by Sarah Sze
- Pathfinder #18700, by Fujiko Nakaya
- Spectral Power. Φeλ (Talking lamppost), Location-specific work, installation, 2013, by Tony Oursler
- Chloé, marble, 2019, by Jaume Plensa
- Möbius trippel by Aase Texmon Rygh
- Skyspace: The Color Beneath, installation, 2010–13, by James Turrell
- Ganzfeld: Double Vision, installation, 2013, by James Turrell
- Mor med barn, bronze, by Per Ung
- Mann og kvinne, Adorasjon, bronze, 1908, by Gustav Vigeland
- Huldra, bronze, by Dyre Vaa
- Traveller, bronze, by Tori Wrånes
