= Ny-Hellesund =

Village in Kristiansand Municipality, Norway

Ny-Hellesund Ny Hellesund
- Village
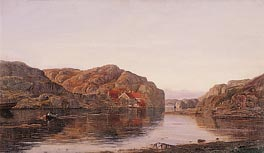
- The painting Morning at Ny-Hellesund; Credit: Amaldus Nielsen
- Interactive map of Ny-Hellesund
- Coordinates: 58.05343°N 7.84041°E
- Country: Norway
- Region: Southern Norway
- County: Agder
- Municipality: Kristiansand Municipality
- Elevation: 3 m (9.8 ft)
- Time zone: UTC+01:00 (CET)
  - Summer (DST): UTC+02:00 (CEST)
- Post Code: 4644 Søgne

Ny-Hellesund is a village area and outport in Kristiansand Municipality in Agder county, Norway. The village area is located on a cluster of three main islands about 3 kilometres (1.9 mi) south of the main harbour at Høllen. The three islands are Monsøya, Helgøya, and Kapelløya. The islands formed an outport because they all have good harbors and approach conditions. The MF Høllen is a ferry that travels to and from Ny-Hellesund several times each day. Many Norwegian painters such as Johan Martin Nielssen and Amaldus Nielsen have portrayed Ny-Hellesund over the years.

Ny-Hellesund has 21 permanent residents (in 2015), but in the summer there are many more temporary residents who live in holiday cottages, guest houses, and boathouses. There is considerable boat traffic through the Hellesundet strait, the main channel between the three islands. In addition, a large number of boaters utilize the fine harbor conditions in the large, sheltered area between the islands of Helgøya and Kapelløya.

== History ==
Ny-Hellesund was from the 18th century known for its pilot station, customs station, guesthouses, and fisheries. Ny-Hellesund can be regarded as one of the best preserved outports in the region. The ongoing preservation of the cultural environment here began in 2009. Ny-Hellesund is also a former shipyard, called "Verftet", which is now converted into a restaurant and guesthouse. The site is designed by artist Per Fronth.

Historically, the village and harbor was part of the old Søgne Municipality until 2020 when it became part of Kristiansand Municipality.

=== Olavsund ===
Olavsund (English: Olav Strait) is the strait that runs between Kapelløya and Helgøya in the central part of Ny-Hellesund. According to legend, it was formed when Saint Olav struck with his sword against the mountain on the run from pursuers. In the narrowest part of Olavsund, it is said that it is possible to see the outline of St. Olav's face in the mountains. Legend says that St. Olav built a chapel on the island Kapelløya (English: Chapel island) as a thanks to the rescue. There are some plans to rebuild the chapel using designs by Sverre Fehn.

=== Coastal fort ===
During World War II, the German occupying military forces built a coastal fort on Helgøya. Work began in 1942 and included Russian prisoners of war in the work. The purpose of the facility was to protect coastal traffic and the west entrance to Kristiansand.

The fort was originally called "Norway's little Gibraltar." The fort had a workforce of 150. It was armed with four 10.5-centimetre (4.1 in) coastal artillery guns had a range of approximately 12 kilometres (7.5 mi). To protect the fort, there were machine guns, mortars, and flame throwers. Furthermore, the fort was equipped with radar, searchlights, and smoke systems. All together there were 31 buildings there along with 26 bulletproof stone bunkers in the area.

The fort was abandoned in 1945 and many of the buildings were demolished and equipment and facilities were removed in an attempt to erase its memory over the following 30–40 years. In 1987, however, restoration work was begun. Several of the 10.5-centimetre (4.1 in) M/13 Schneider guns are back in place. Fortification, trenches, roads, and tunnels in the area is secured and repaired, so the area is easily accessible.

== Media gallery ==
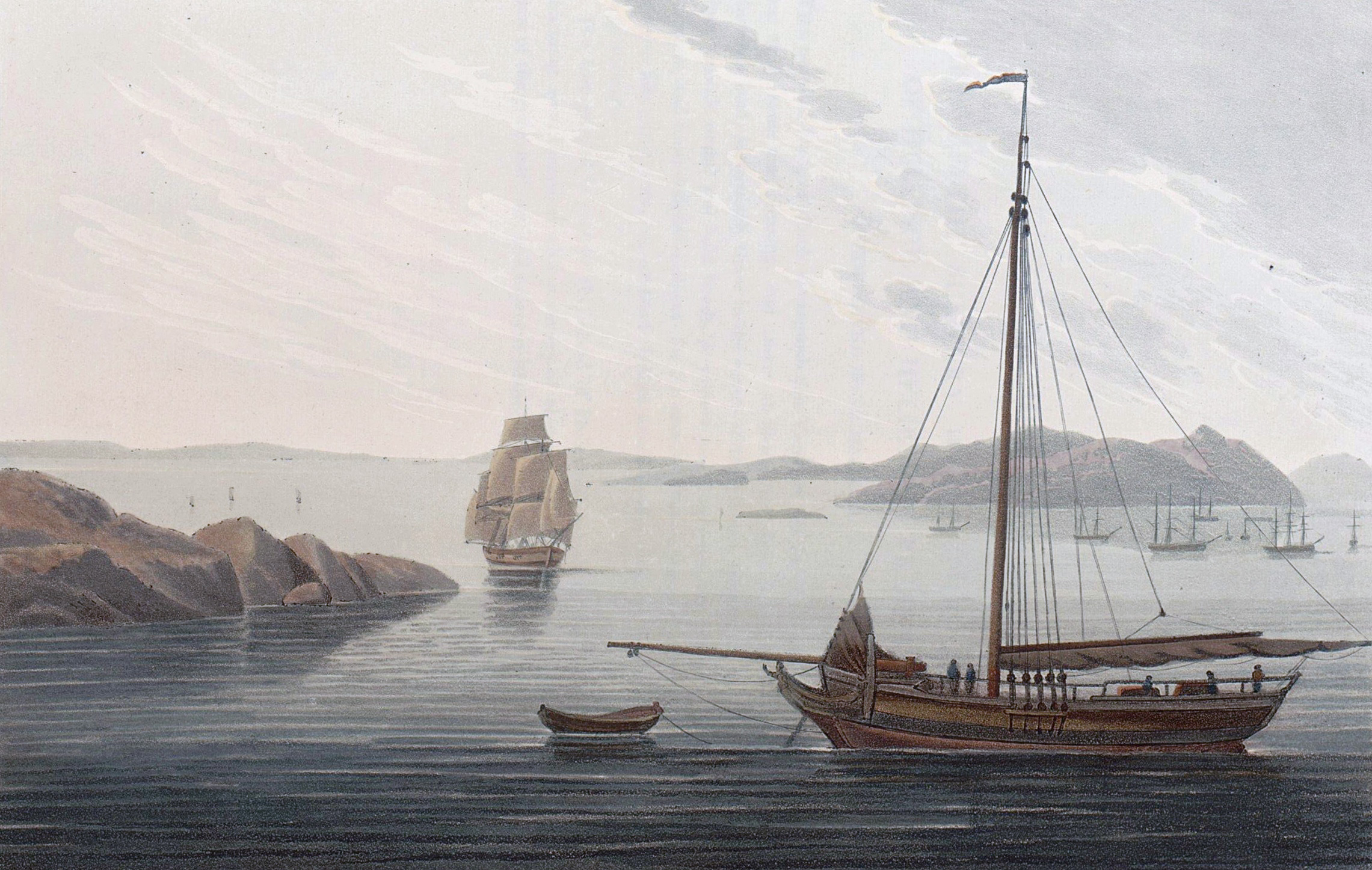
Ny-Hellesund (year 1800) from Boydell's picturesque scenery of Norway

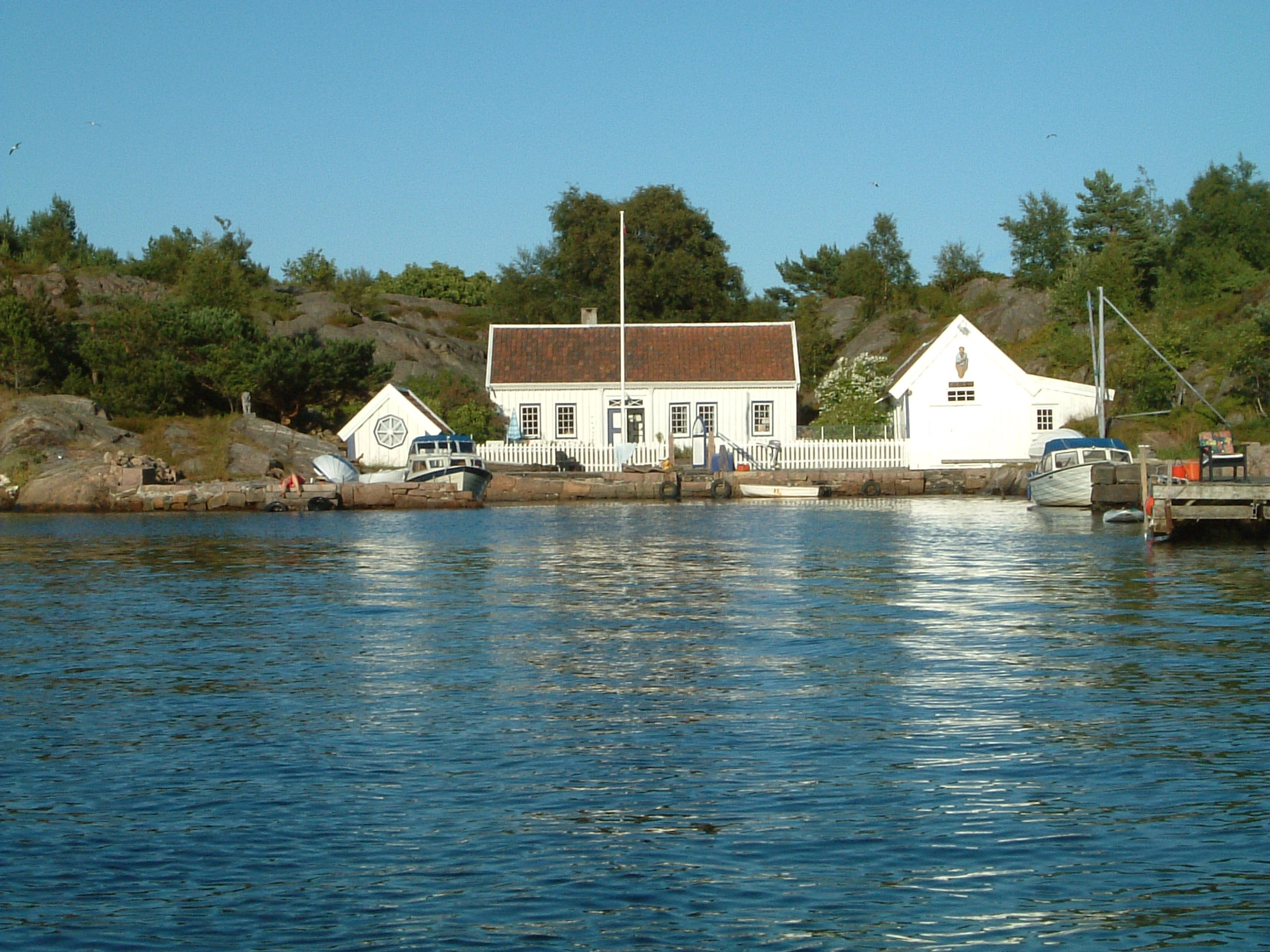
Wilhelm Krags residence in Ny-Hellesund

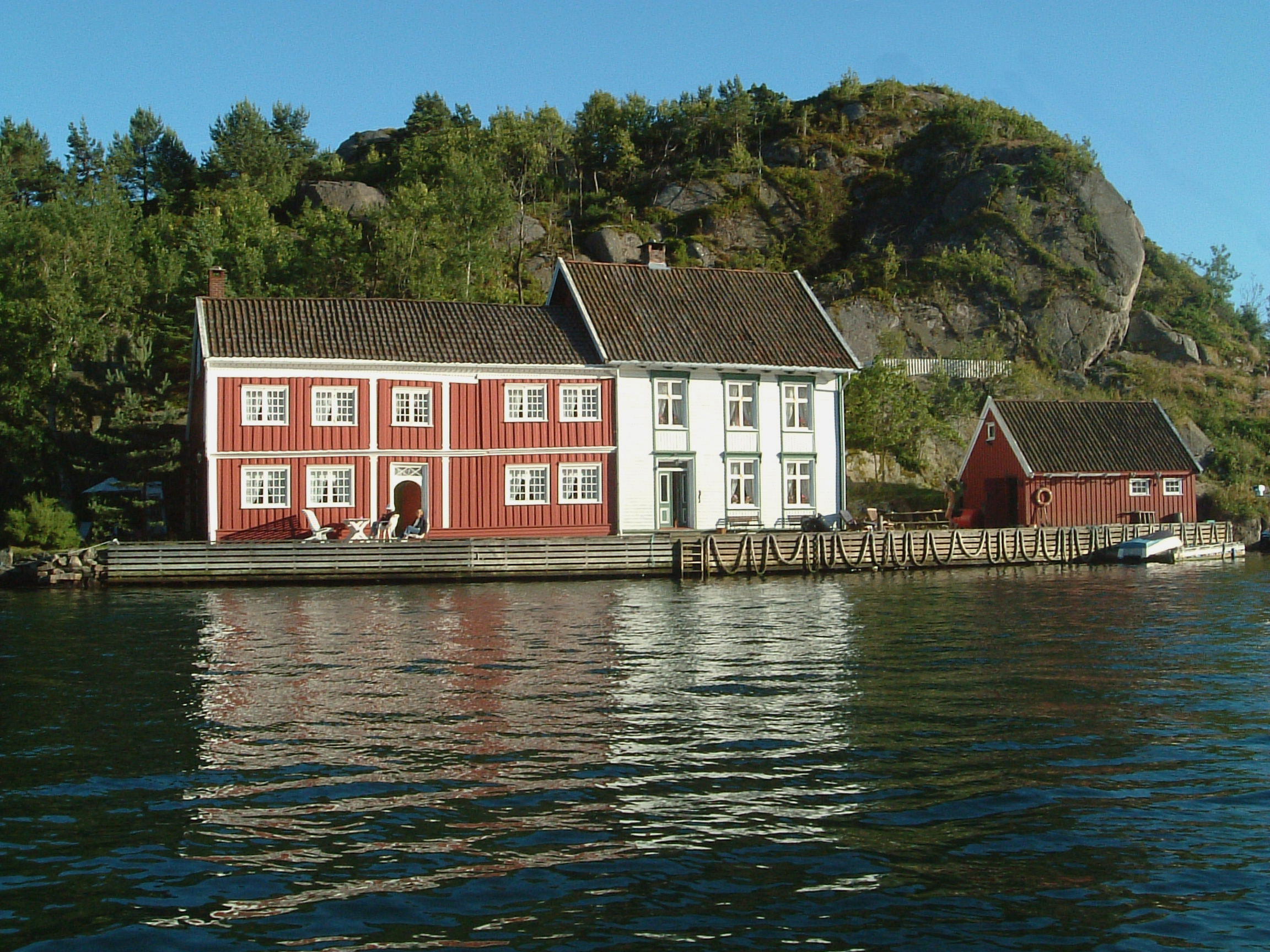
The former inn that had Royal privileges from 1766

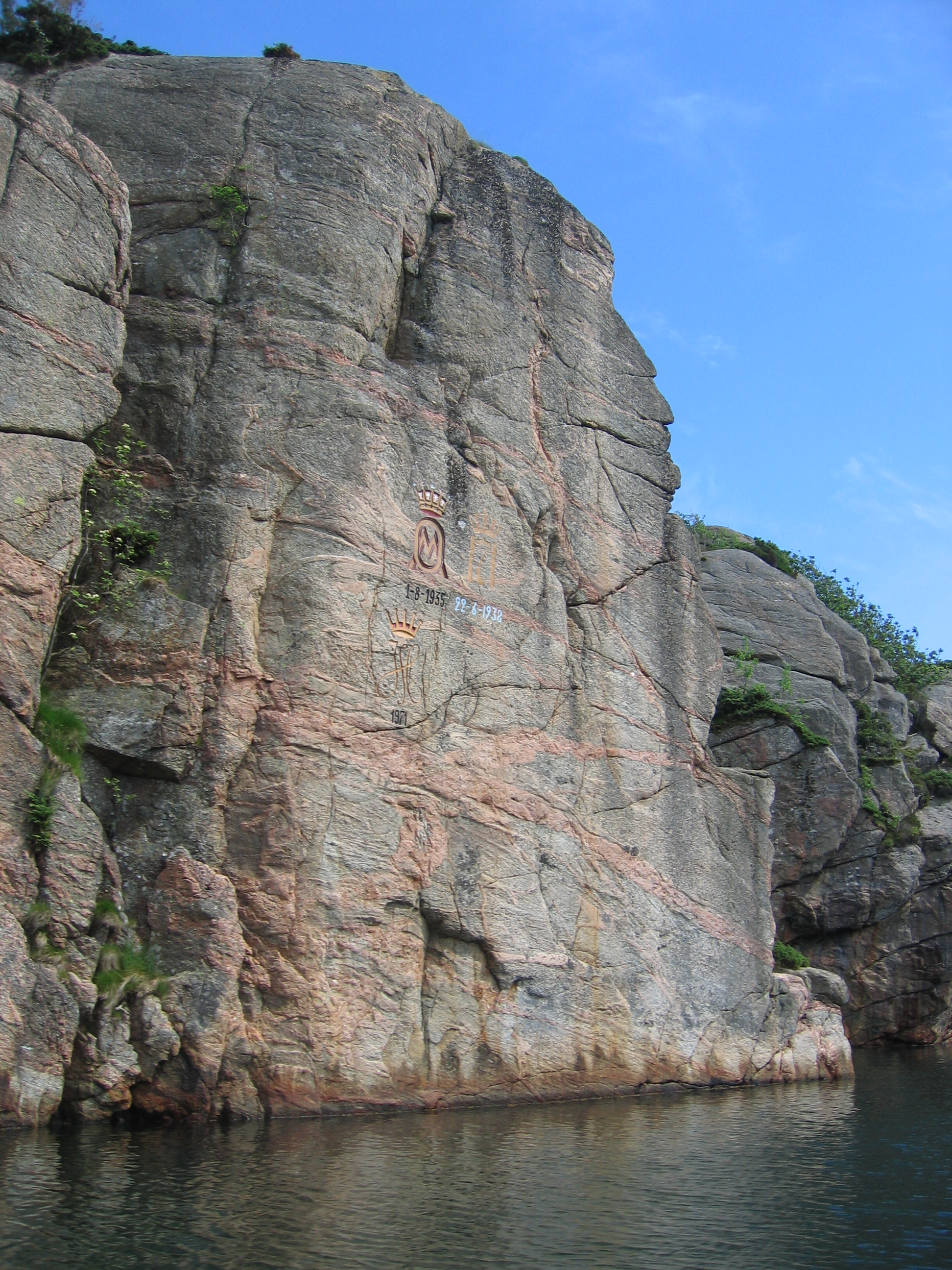
Olavsund strait, where a face can be seen in the rock wall

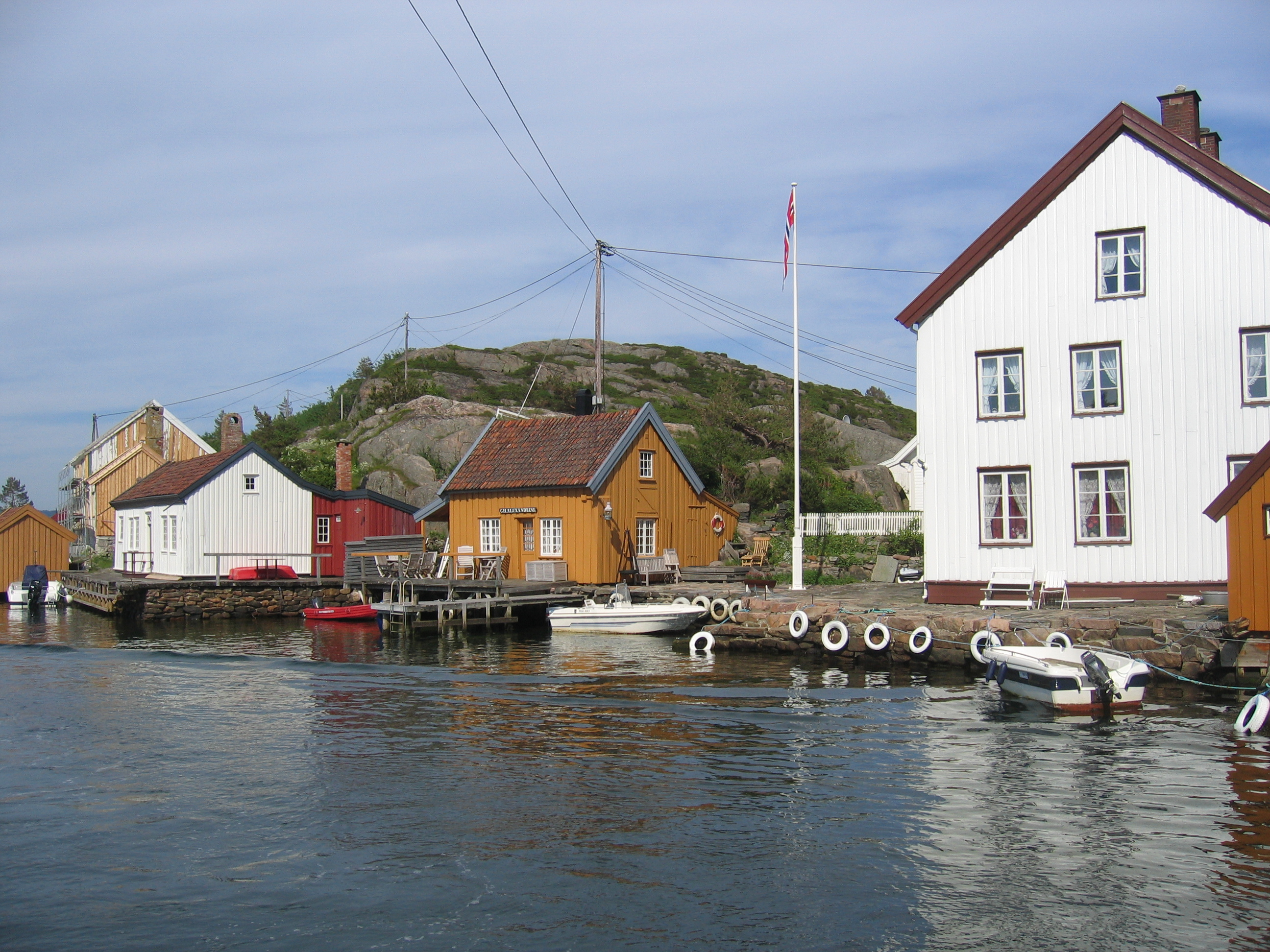
Harbour area by Olavsund

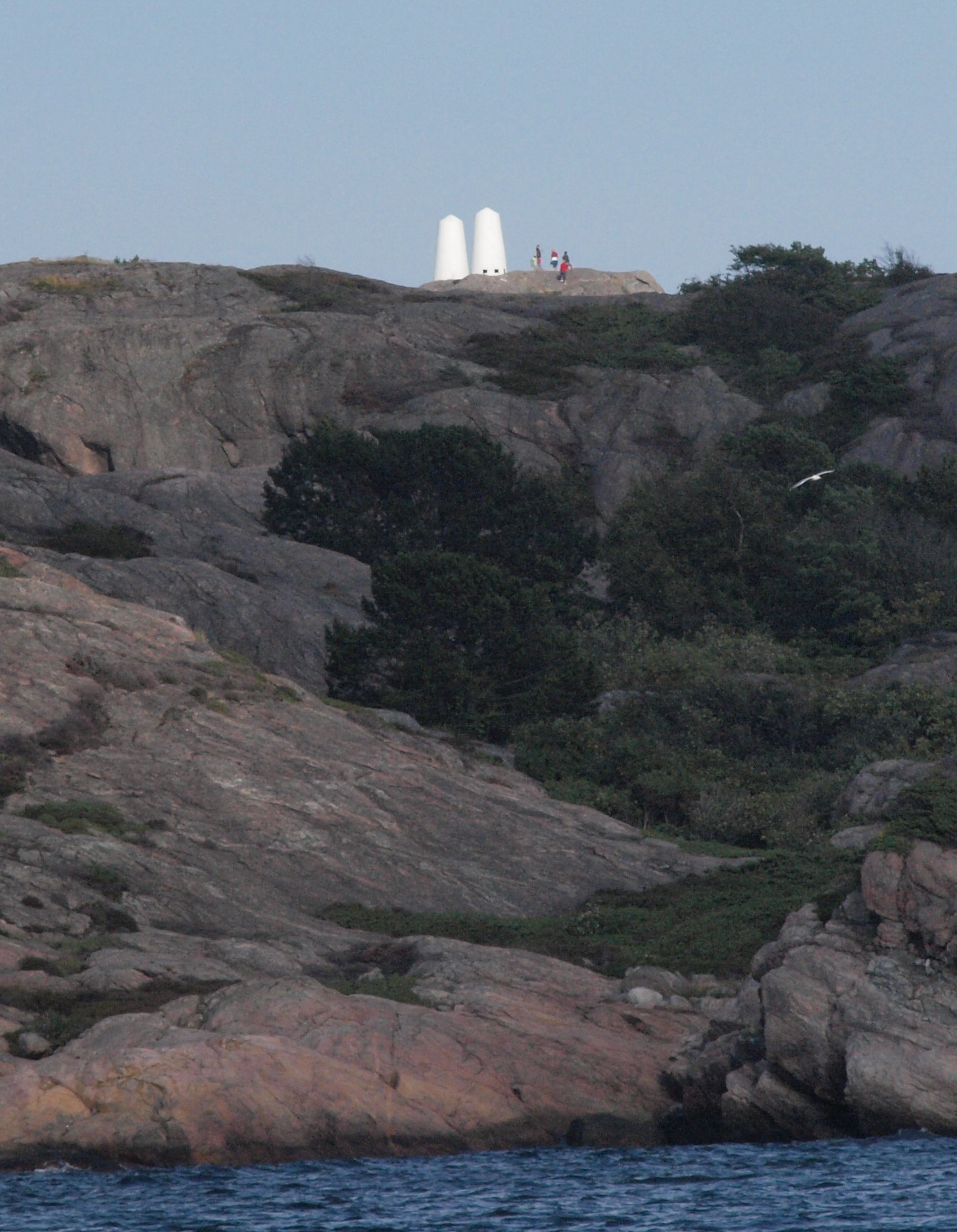
The two white cairns at Helgøya, rebuilt after World War II, was set up to make the sound recognizable from the ocean (Skagerrak)
