= Ekebergrestauranten =

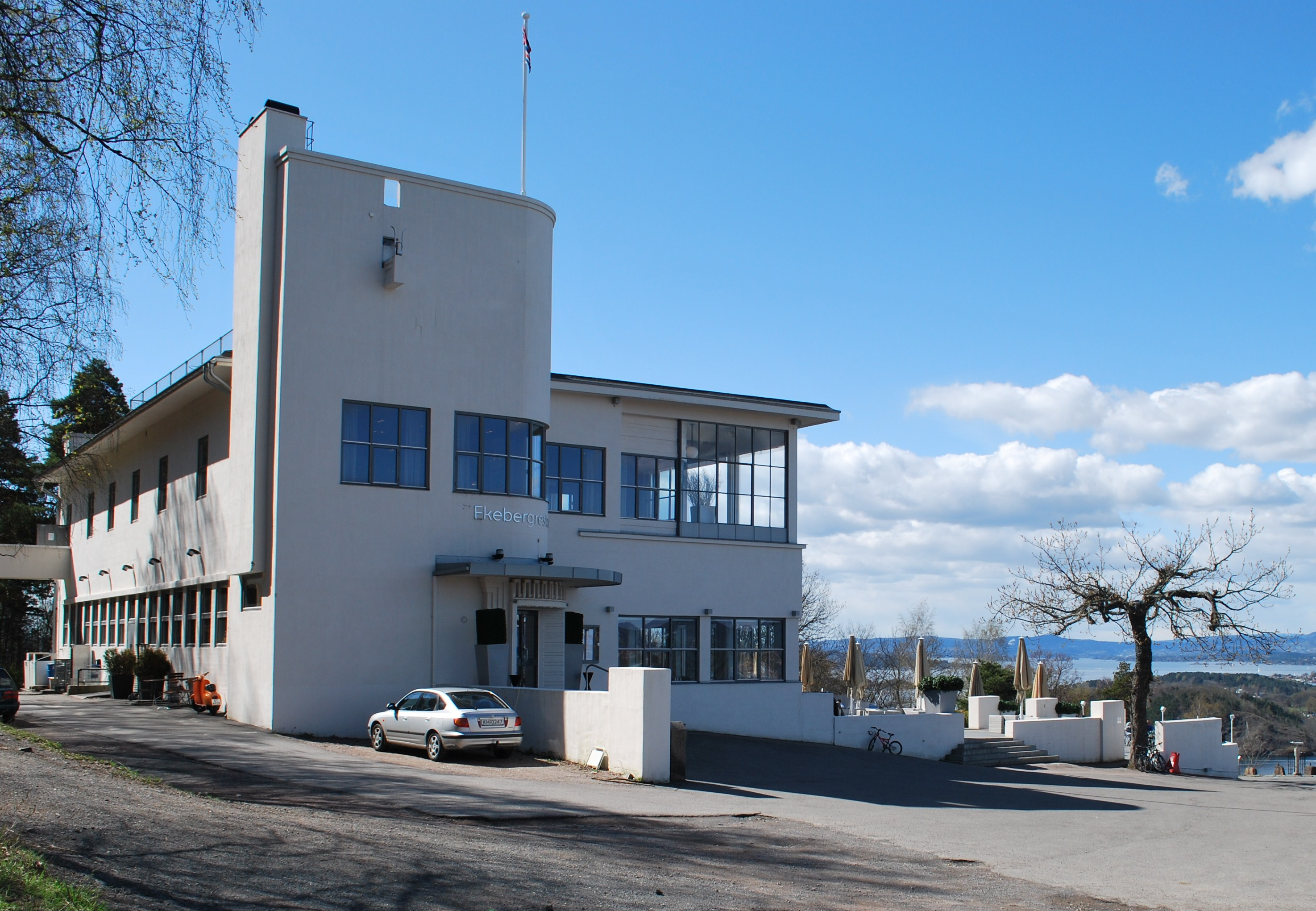
- Ekebergrestauranten at Ekeberg
- Interactive map of Ekebergrestauranten

Restaurant information
- Established: 1929, extensively restored 2005
- Owner: Christian Ringnes
- Food type: Norwegian cuisine
- Location: 59°53′57.138″N 10°45′42.037″E; Kongsveien 15; Ekeberg, Oslo, N-0193, Norway
- Website: www.ekebergrestauranten.com/english

Ekebergrestauranten is a restaurant and banquet facility in a hillside overlooking downtown Oslo, Norway. Ekebergparken Sculpture Park is the nearest neighbor. The restaurant has been owned by Christian Ringnes since 2005.

The Functionalist building was first completed in 1929, drawn by architect Lars Backer. The restaurant has flat roofs, large windows, a terrace and an arched entrance in a corner tower. The architect maximized the number of window seats.

The building was once one of the city's most popular dancing restaurants, but in the 1980s the building decayed and was closed in 1997. The restaurant has since undergone an extensive restoration and reopened in March 2005. The interior of the new Ekebergrestauranten was designed by Thomas Ness.

The à la carte restaurant on the ground floor serves a seasonal menu of food made from fresh ingredients. There is a banquet hall on the second floor with room for 170 people for dinner and two rooms suitable for smaller events. The terrace has about 300 chairs in the summer months.

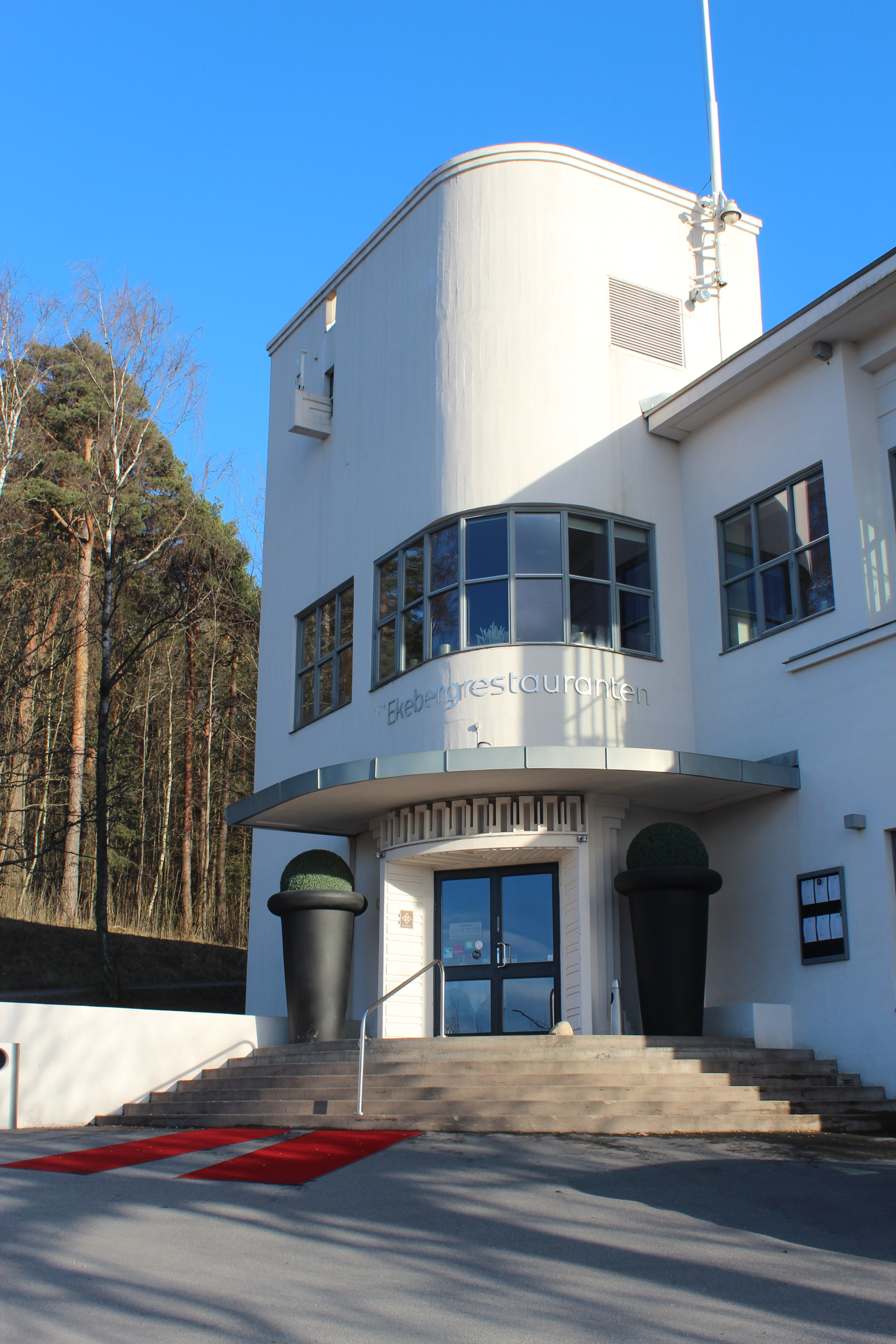
Entrance

The menu includes vegetarian, meat and traditional Norwegian fish dishes.

Ekebergrestauranten is listed by the Norwegian Directorate for Cultural Heritage and protected by law.

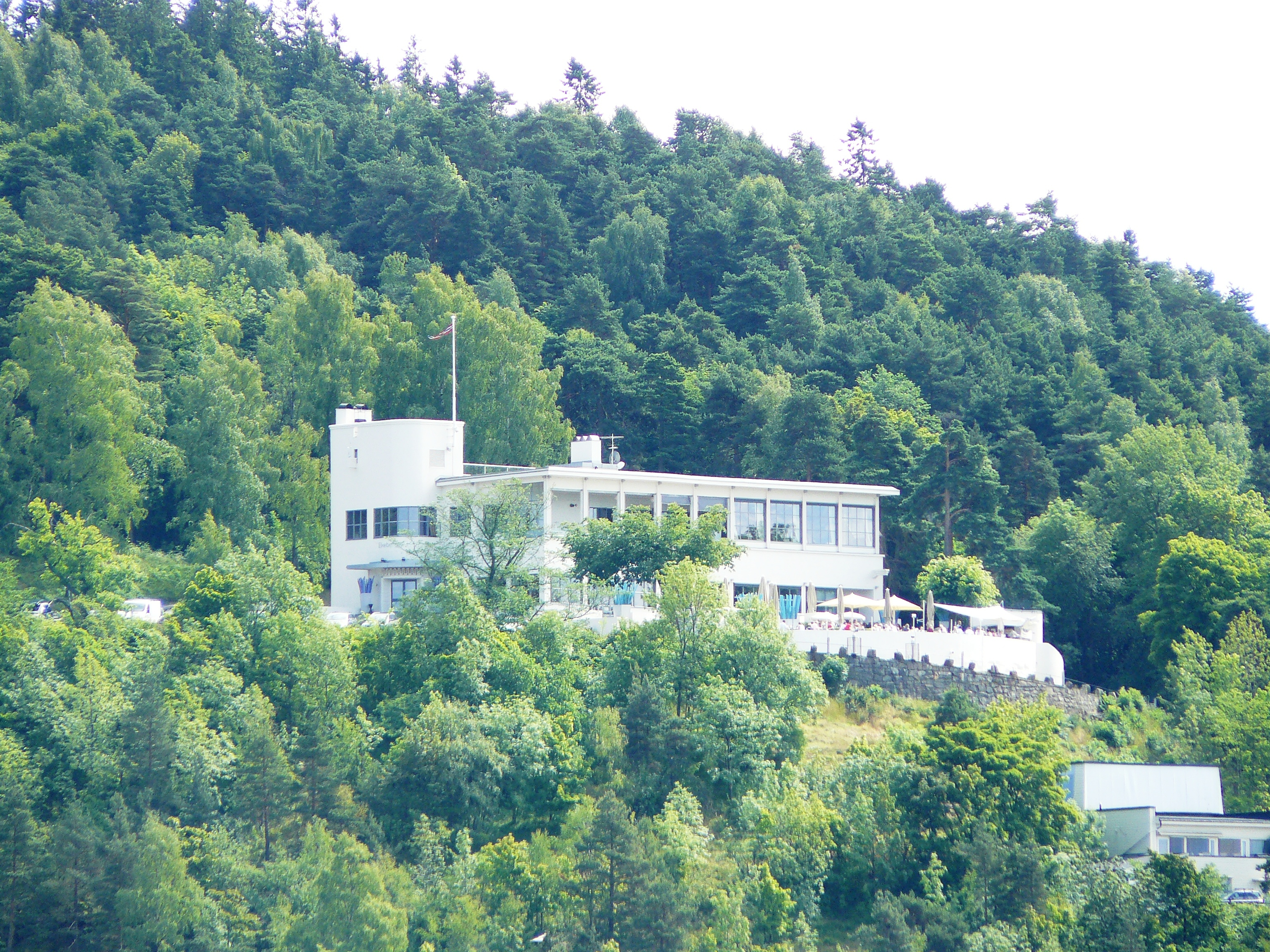
Ekebergrestauranten's location in the hillside

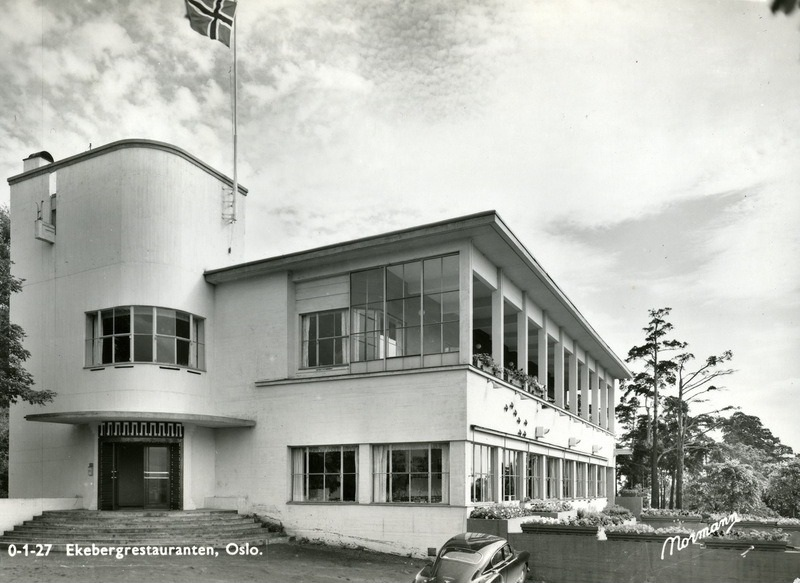
Ekebergrestauranten as a postcard motif in the 1950s
