= Aase Texmon Rygh =

Norwegian sculptor (1925–2019)

- Aase Texmon Rygh in 2018
- Born: April 13, 1925; Troms County, Norway
- Died: May 21, 2019 (aged 94)
- Education: Norwegian National Academy of Craft and Art Industry 1944-46; Royal Danish Academy of Fine Arts 1948-49
- Notable work: Möbius
- Style: Modernism
- Website: www.rygh.org

Aase Texmon Rygh (April 13, 1925 – May 21, 2019) was a Norwegian sculptor working in the modernist style.

== Early life and education ==
Aase Texmon Rygh was born in Troms County, Norway. She studied at the Norwegian National Academy of Craft and Art Industry from 1944 until 1946. Two years later, she studied at the Royal Danish Academy of Fine Arts, under Einar Utzon-Frank, for one year. In 1950, she visited Paris, where she visited the Louvre. The visit would be pivotal in shaping her career as a professional artist.

== Career ==
Texmon Rygh primarily exhibited in Norway, with a retrospective exhibition at the Henie-Onstad Art Centre in 1992. She has had solo works and participated in group exhibitions in Oslo, Bergen, Antwerp and São Paulo.

=== Work ===
The Möbius series were Texmon Rygh's signature works. They are sculptures based on the mathematical Möbius strip as the German mathematician August Ferdinand Möbius developed.

== Later life and legacy ==
In 2001, Aase Texmon Rygh became a knight of 1 Class of the Royal Norwegian Order of St. Olav.

Texmon Rygh died May, 2019.

== Notable exhibitions ==
- 2018: Aase Texmon Rygh. The Form of Eternity at Alta Museum, Alta, Norway

== Notable works ==
- Spiral II, bronze plaque, 1952 in Tønsberg
- Bjørn Farmann monument, bronze plaque, 1971 in Tønsberg
- Løk (Onions) , 1977, Norwegian University of Life Sciences, Ås
- Volta, in 1978, Furuset Senter, Oslo
- Brutt form (Broken terms), 1983, Furuset Senter, Oslo
- Möbius triple, at Ekebergparken Sculpture Park, Oslo
