= Per Inge Bjørlo =

Norwegian sculptor, painter, graphic designer and visual artist

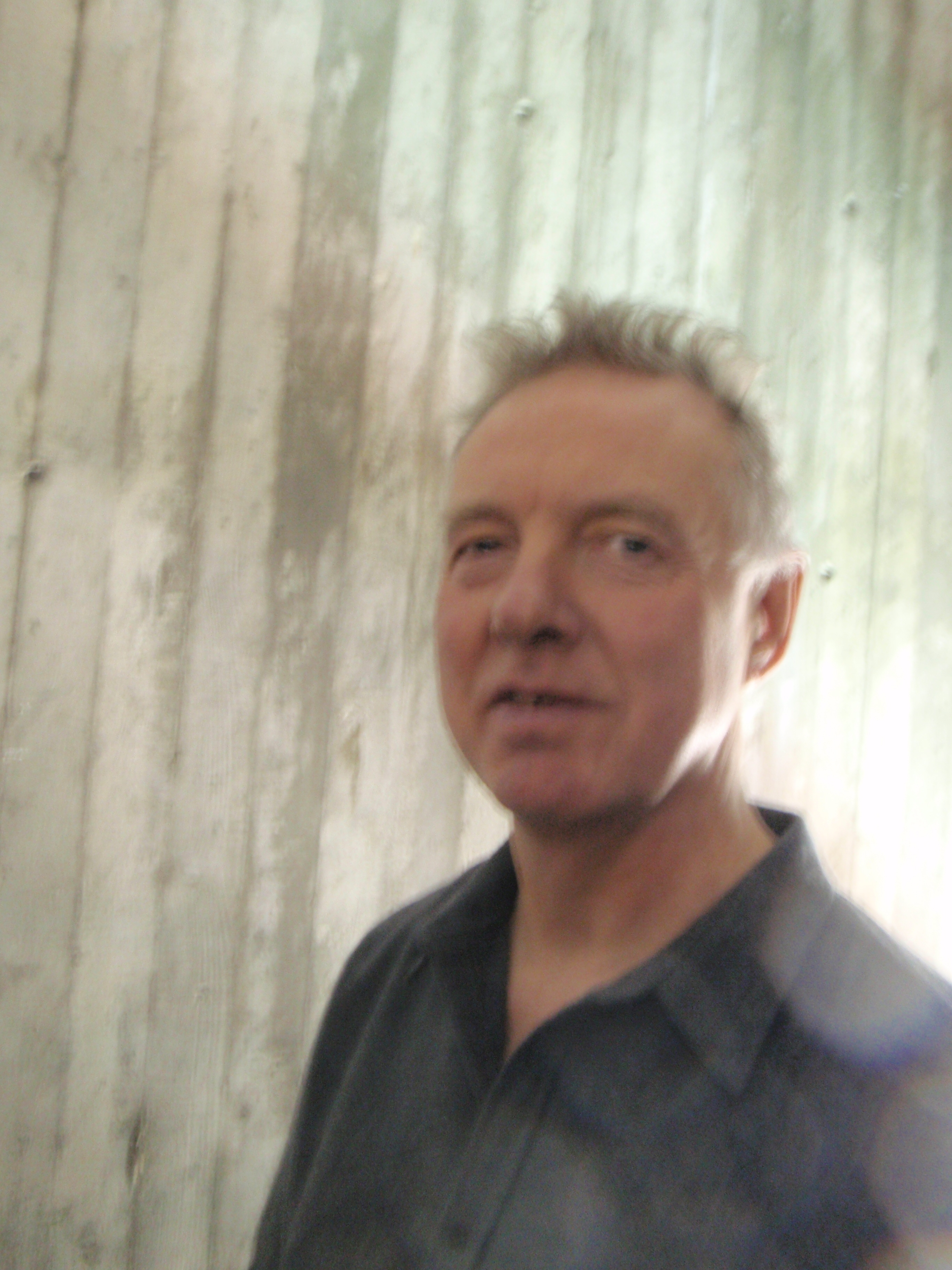
- Per Inge Bjørlo in 2012
- Born: Per Inge Bjørlo; 20 November 1952 (age 74) Ålesund, Norway
- Areas: Visual artist; sculptor, painter, graphic designer
- Awards: Prince Eugen Medal 2012

Per Inge Bjørlo (born 20 November 1952, in Ålesund) is a Norwegian sculptor, painter, graphic designer and visual artist. He grew up in Spjelkavik outside Ålesund, and is now living in Hønefoss. He graduated from Bergen Academy of Art and Design in Bergen (1974–1977) and the Norwegian National Academy of Fine Arts in Oslo (1977–1981). He received the Swedish Prince Eugen Medal in 2012.

Bjørlo has had a number of exhibitions of his works in Norway and abroad. He has been represented at exhibitions, among others in São Paulo, Berlin, Venice, Tokyo, New York City and Cologne.

== Works of art ==
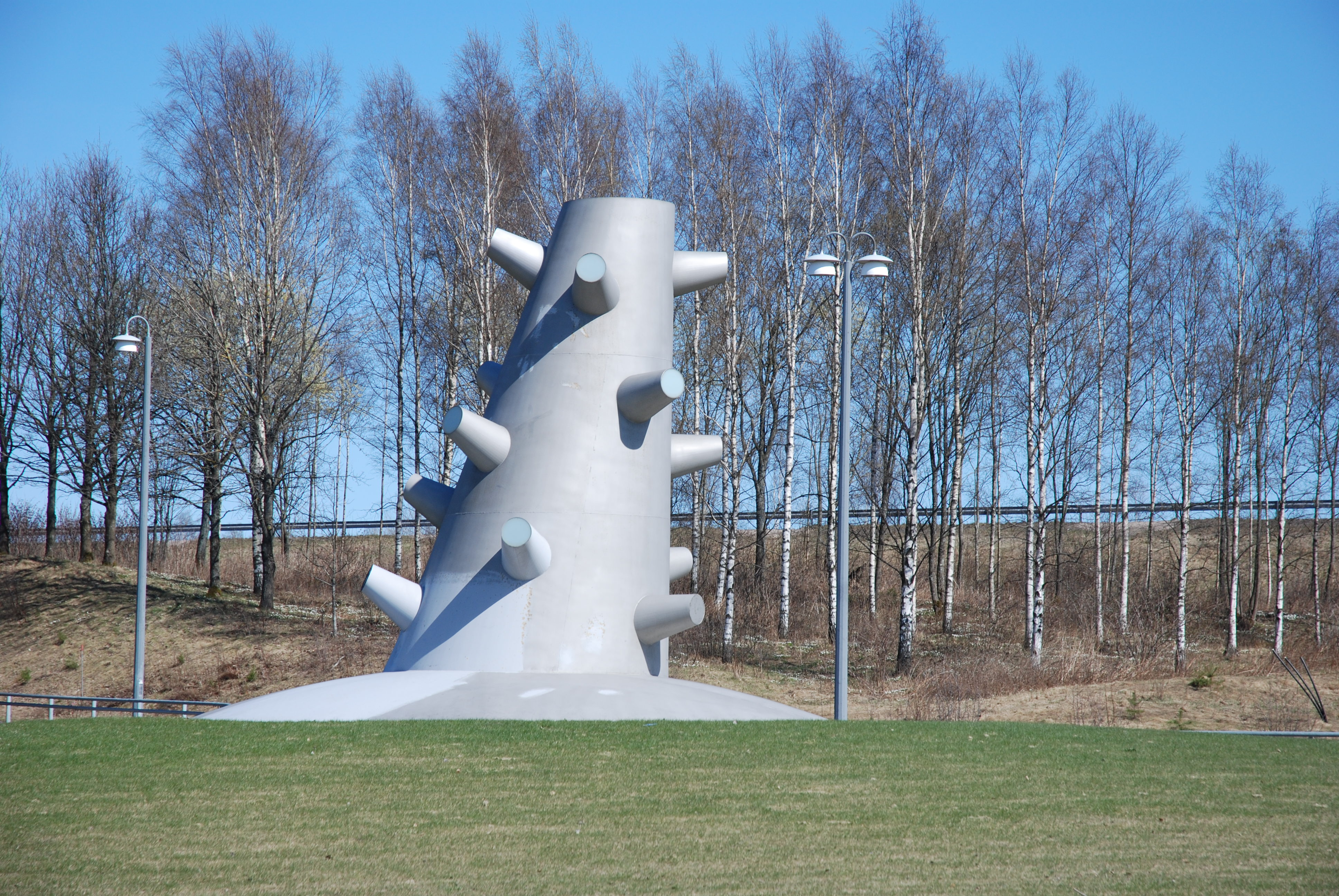
Riktning (Direction), 2003, Värnamo, Sweden

Of his central decoration projects, the series of sculptures in connection to Oslo Airport, Gardermoen, are the most prominent. Some other works are:

- Thinking, 2002, sandblasted steel sheet outside the University Library in Karlstad, Sweden
- Peeling / Crane, 2002, fiberglass by the main entrance to the University of Agder in Kristiansand, Norway
- Riktning (Direction), 2003, Värnamo in Sweden
- Indre rom VI. Livsløpet (Inner Space VI. The Realm of Life), 2013, stainless steel at Ekebergparken Sculpture Park, Oslo, Norway

== Literature ==
- Per Inge Bjorlo: The Weight of a Lung and the Sound of Crows, Forlaget Press, 2018, ISBN 9788232801596
- Per Inge Bjørlo, Poul Erik Tøjner, Edition Bløndal, Hellerup, 1991, (in Norwegian) ISBN 87-88978-25-7
- Per Inge Bjørlos potensielle rom, Inger Eri, Museet for Samtidskunst, (in Norwegian), 2001
- Per Inge Bjørlo – Selected works, Bente Larsen, Galleri Riis, 2007.
