= Hilde Mæhlum =

Norwegian sculptor

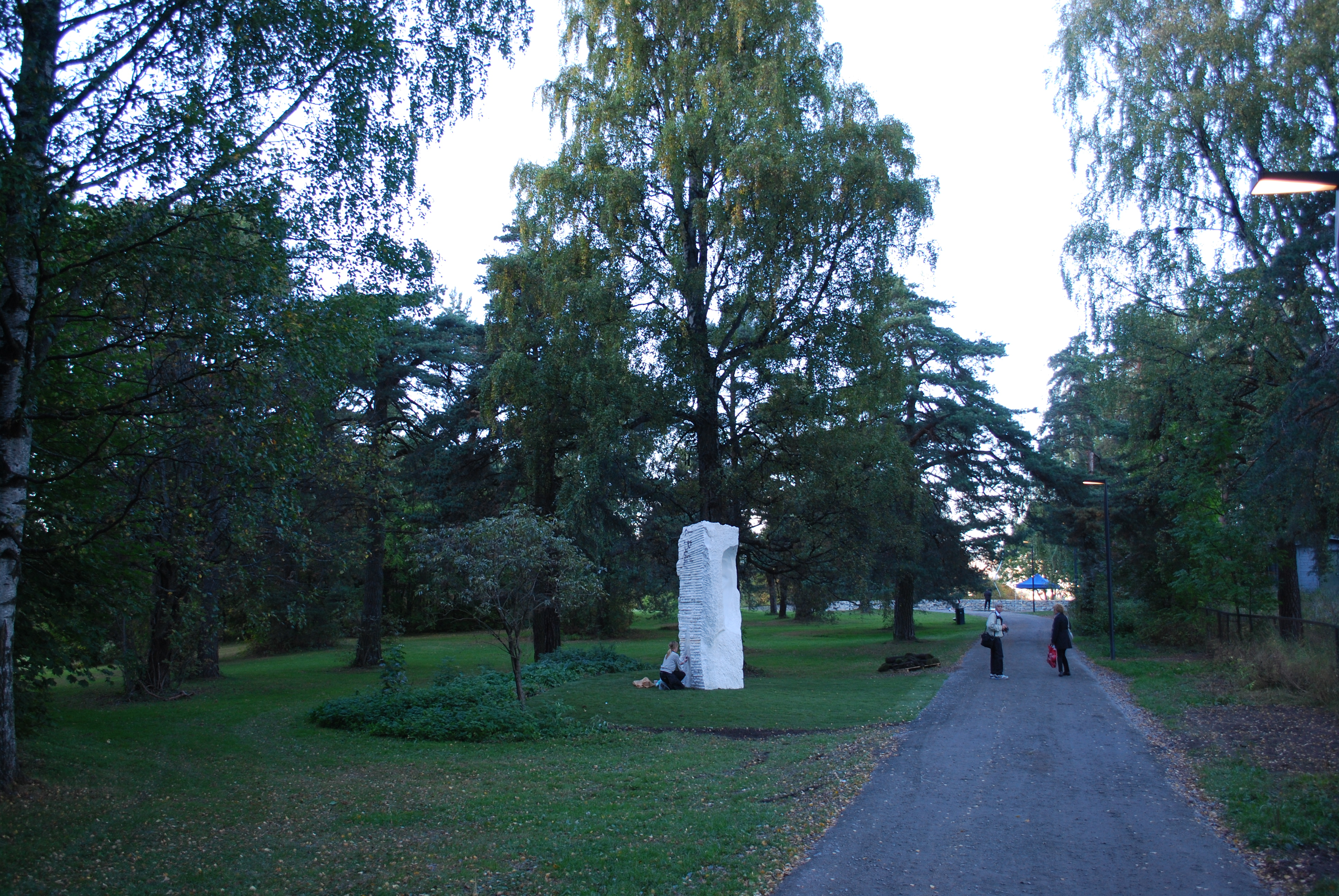
Hilde Mæhlum's "Concave face" in Ekebergparken Sculpture Park

Hilde Mæhlum (born 19 March 1945 in Notodden, Norway) is a Norwegian sculptor. She lives and works in Oslo. She is purchased by the National Gallery of Norway, and has had numerous solo exhibitions. Hilde Mæhlum is working with visualization of communication or lack of communication between people. She is especially known for the sculptures of masks and sculptures of faces.

Hilde Mæhlum has her education from Norwegian National Academy of Craft and Art Industry in Oslo from 1965 to 1968, the Norwegian National Academy of Fine Arts, Oslo from 1968 to 1975 in addition to shorter education in Dublin and New York.

== Public art ==
- Maskebærere (Mask users), sculpture at Bærums Verk
- Karyatide, sculpture, Bærums Verk
- Drøm (Dream), sculpture, Bærums Verk
- Vigilant, outside Rogaland Museum of Art, Stavanger
- Innsyn II (Insight II), granite, Hekkveien 5, Oslo
- Konkavt ansikt (Concave face), marble, 2006, in Ekebergparken Sculpture Park, Oslo.
