= Oslo Astrological Clock =

Clock in Oslo, Norway

Coordinates: 59.9114°N 10.7489°E

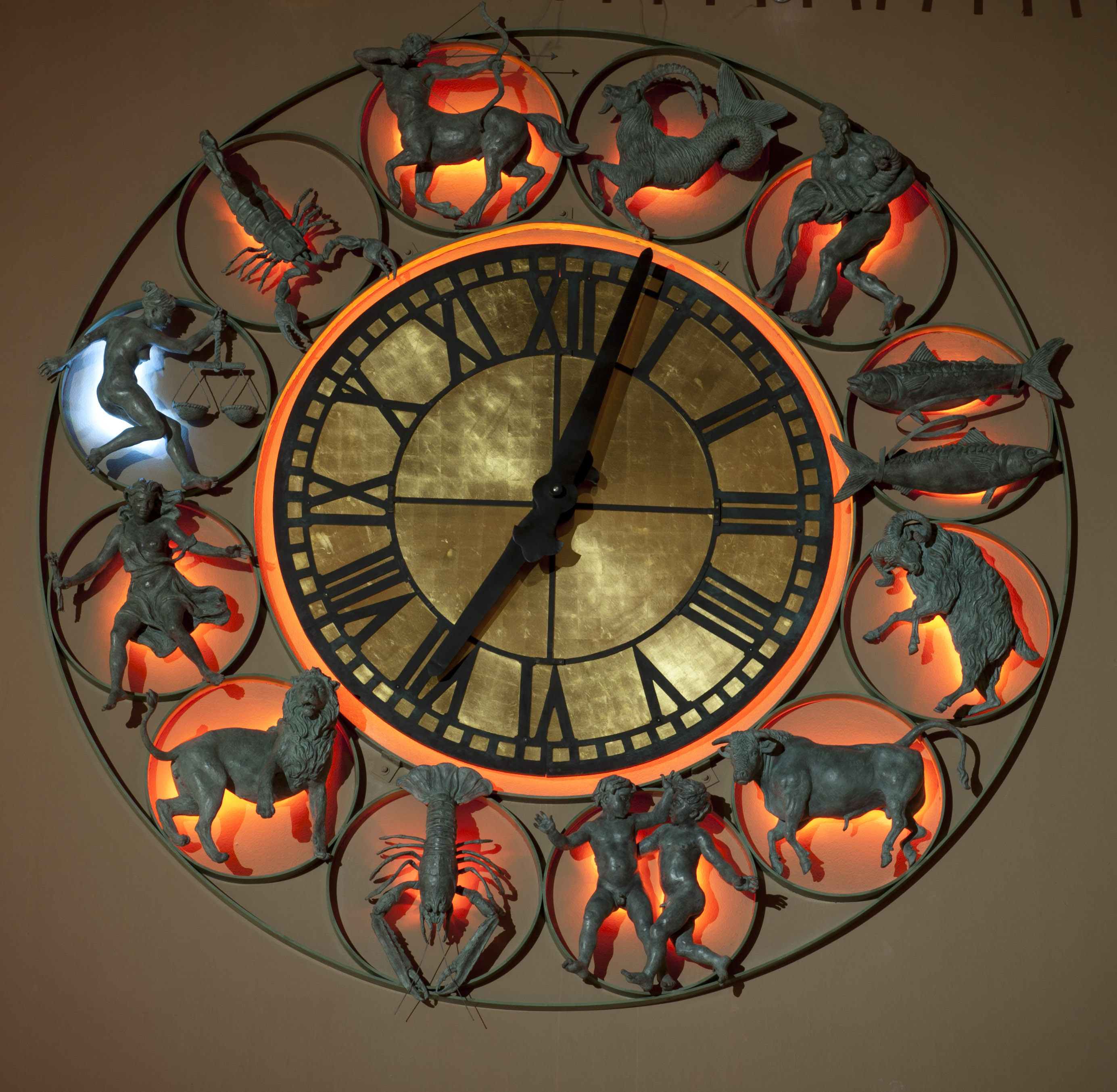
Oslo astrological clock

The Oslo Astrological Clock is located at Karl Johans gate 3 in Oslo, the capital city of Norway. The astrological clock was donated by Christian Ringnes and features artwork designed by artists Elena Engelsen and Per Ung. Ringnes explained during his unveiling speech, "we aim to actively contribute in making Oslo a beautiful and pleasant city."

== Clock Structure ==
The clock is 346 centimetres (136 in) in diameter; with the clock face at 180 centimetres (71 in). Astrological signs are cast in bronze and are painted. The rings are made of copper and are also painted. The tiles in the dial are coated with 22-carat gold leaf and the total weight of the clock is approx. 1,000 kilograms (2,200 lb).

== Artwork ==
It was designed by artists Elena Engelsen and Per Ung, who spent over a year collaborating on the project. Engelsen created the exotic animal characters star, while Ung designed the human characters in the zodiac. This was the couple’s second joint artwork venture.

== Unveiling ==
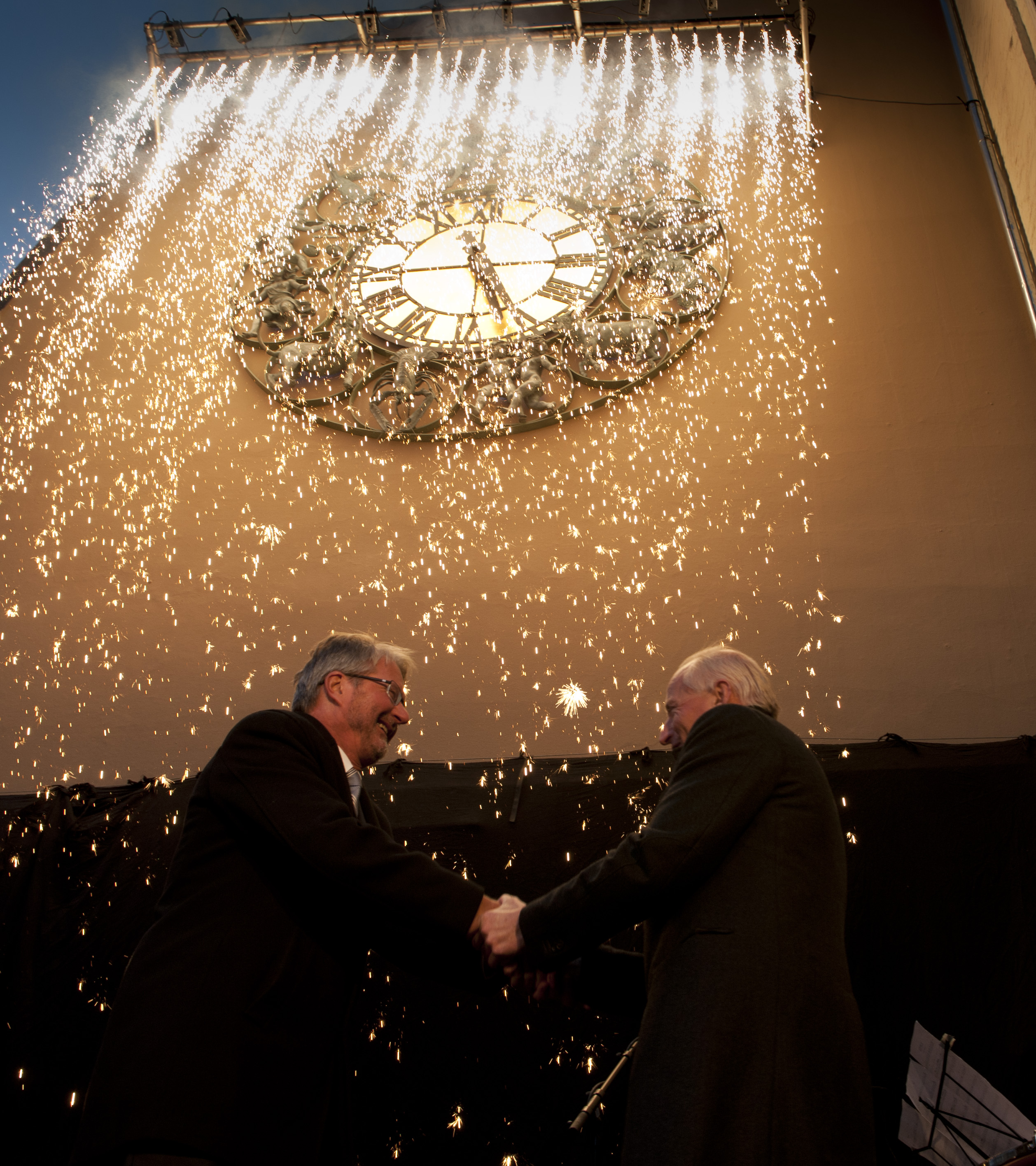
Mayor Fabian Stang and Christian Ringnes during the clock's unveiling ceremony

The unveiling of the clock took place on October 20, 2010 at a ceremony hosted by Mayor Fabian Stang at Karl Johans gate 3 in central Oslo. He has been quoted as saying, “We are incredibly proud that Oslo now has an astrological clock, especially as it was designed by Elena Engelsen and Per Ung, two of Norway’s most renowned artists. The clock is clearly visible and will set a solid mark on the cityscape." As a representation of the 12 Zodiac signs, 12 of the foremost astrologers in Norway were among the invited guests at the ceremony.

== See also ==
- Prague Astronomical Clock
