= Henning Engelsen =

Norwegian woodcarver and illustrator

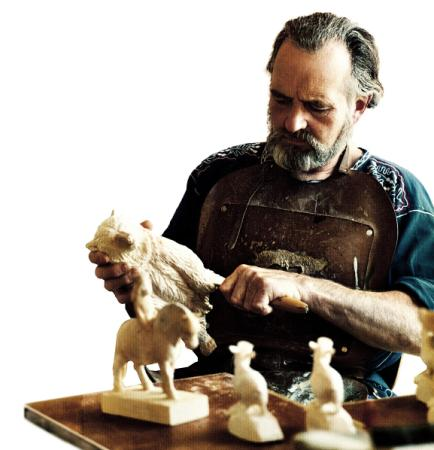
Henning Engelsen

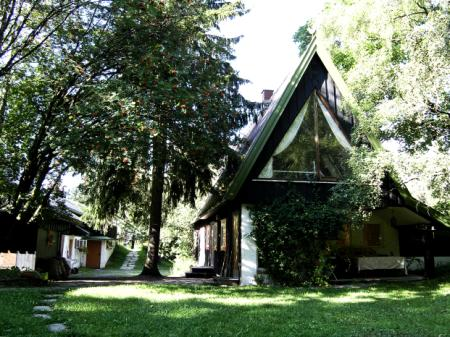
Engelsens Workshop

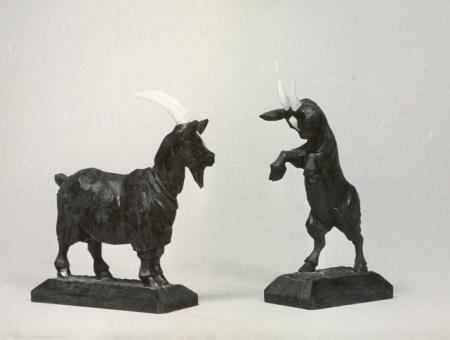
Goats carved in wood by Henning Engelsen, 1958

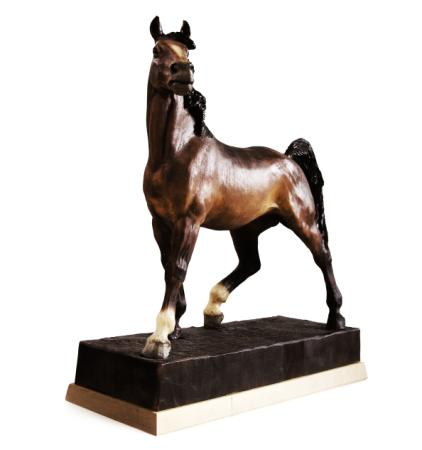
Horse carved in wood by Henning Engelsen, 1980

Henning Engelsen (5 February 1918 – 8 September 2005) was a Norwegian woodcarver and illustrator.

== Biography ==
Henning Engelsen was born at Sandefjord in Vestfold, Norway. He started his woodcarving career in 1947 in a small workshop at Toten in the eastern part of Norway, where he founded the wood carving company HENNING. From the start his idea was to create a world of wood carved figures that radiate joy and humanity and inspire us to rise above the ordinary. His rich and manifold production counts hundreds of different motives, illustrating animal life, myths and Norwegian folklore.

During the 1950s and 1960s HENNING grew steadily and was soon to be the leading enterprise on the Norwegian souvenir market, exporting figurines to all over the world. At the time, Engelsen had more than 25 craftsmen working in his studio. He ran HENNING with great success until 1988. Two of his three daughters; Christl Engelsen, Angelina Engelsen and his son-in-law, Bjarne Espedal, are now running the workshop, keeping Engelsens manifold production alive. His third daughter is the sculptor Elena Engelsen, who was married to sculptor and graphic artist Per Ung (1933–2013).
