= Amaldus Nielsen =

Norwegian painter (1838–1932)

Amaldus Clarin Nielsen
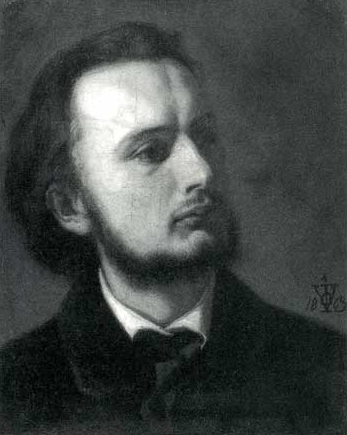
- Portrait by Olaf Isaachsen (1863)
- Born: 23 May 1838; Halse, Norway
- Died: 10 December 1932 (aged 94)
- Education: Düsseldorf Academy
- Known for: Painting
- Notable work: Hvalørhei, Skovbillede, Morgen ved Ny-Hellesund
- Movement: naturalism
- Awards: Knight, First Class of the Royal Norwegian Order of St. Olav

Amaldus Clarin Nielsen (23 May 1838 – 10 December 1932) was a Norwegian painter.

== Early life ==
He was born in Halse in Mandals landdistrikt municipality in Lister og Mandal Amt (county), Norway. He was a son of shipmaster and merchant Niels Clemetsen Nielsen (1795–1845) and his wife Andrea Marie Møller (1802–1866). He grew up in the neighboring town of Mandal. He lived most of his childhood and adolescence without a father. He received some tuition from a traveling drawing teacher and traveled to Copenhagen to study in 1854.

== Career ==
After one year of painting studies in Copenhagen, he enrolled at the Academy of Art in 1855. He failed to progress in the academy's system, but with financial support from his brother and business owner Diderik Cappelen (1856–1935), he studied under Hans Gude at the Düsseldorf Academy from 1857 to 1859. He spent the years 1859 to 1863 travelling over Western and Southern Norway, and spent 1863 to 1864 in Düsseldorf again. He is associated with the Düsseldorf school of painting. He then travelled home due to illness, moved to Christiania where he sealed a deal to make paintings that the Christiania Kunstforening would sell at auctions, securing a steady income. He spent the years 1867 to 1868 in Karlsruhe before finally settling at Majorstuen in 1869.

He painted in the naturalist style, and has been called "Norway's first naturalist painter". Important paintings include Hvalørhei (1874), Skovbillede (1896), Morgen ved Ny-Hellesund (1885, one of several from Ny-Hellesund), Ensomt sted (1901), Fra Bankefjorden (1910) and Kveld på Jæren (1925) Most of his paintings portrayed Western and Southern Norway, but also Østfold.

He participated almost annually in the Autumn Exhibit between 1883 and 1911, and held notable exhibitions in Christiania Kunstforening (1895, 1906, 1924, 1931), at the 1862 International Exhibition, the Exposition Universelle of 1889 and in Munich in 1913. Eleven of his works are owned by the National Museum of Art, Architecture and Design. He is also represented in Mandal Kunstforening and Mandal Bymuseum, but is perhaps best known for the collection of about 300 works which was donated to Oslo municipality by Nielsen's heirs in 1933. Since 1994 this collection is on permanent exhibit in the Stenersen Museum. Nielsen was also decorated as a Knight, First Class of the Royal Norwegian Order of St. Olav in 1890. The square Amaldus Nielsens plass, which includes a bust of Nielsen, was named after him.

== Personal life ==
In October 1868 in Christiania he married Johanne Nicoline Augusta Vangensteen, born 1845 as a daughter of district stipendiary magistrate Ove Bodvar Hussein Vangensteen (1806–1859). The couple had eleven children. Both his wife and three children died in March 1886 from a diphtheria epidemic. After a grieving period, he married Laura Tandberg (1857–1928) in February 1888 in Risør. Nielsen died in December 1932, aged 94, from pneumonia.

== Gallery ==
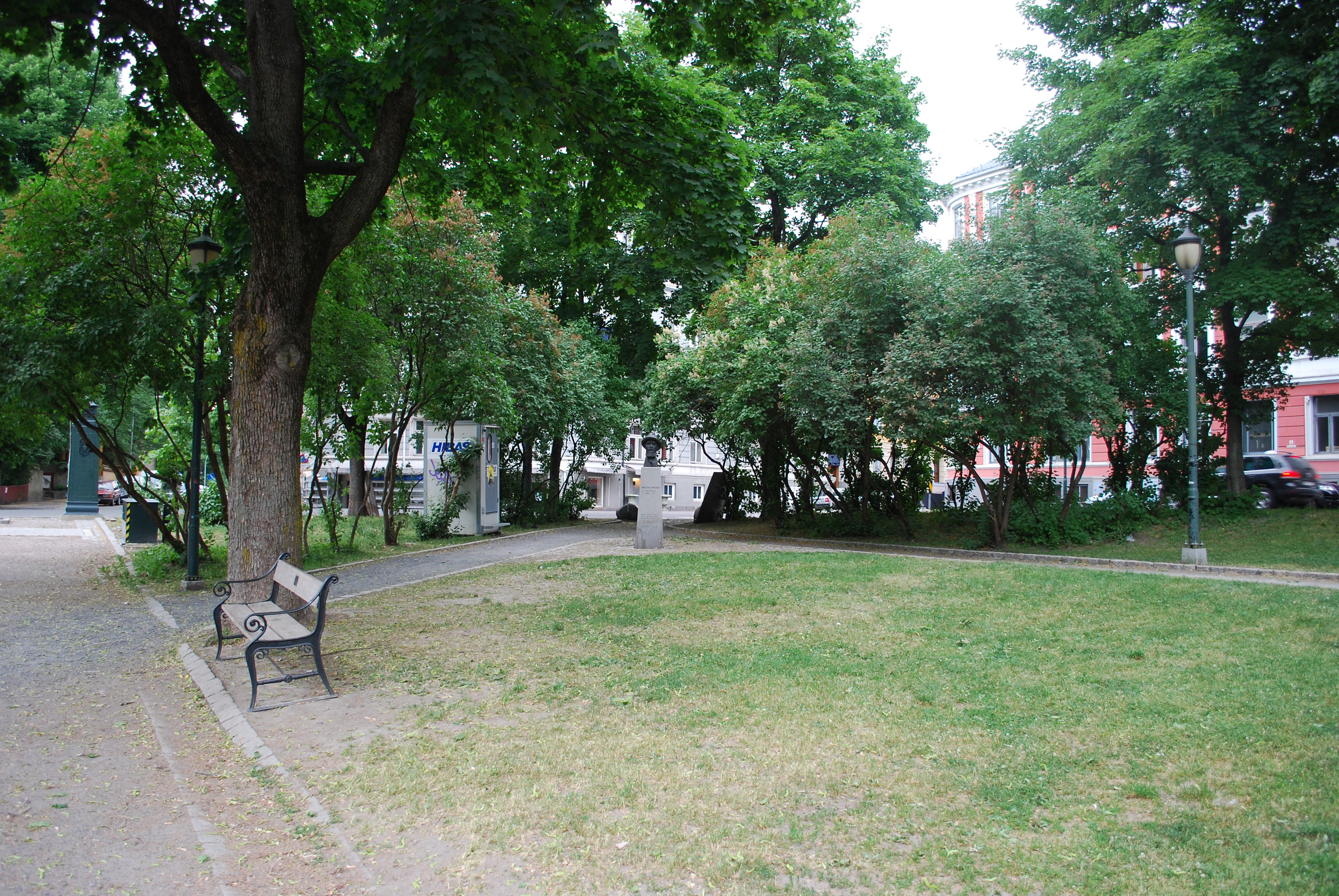
Amaldus Nielsens Plaza

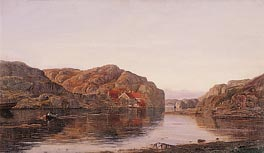
Morning at Ny-Hellesund (1885)

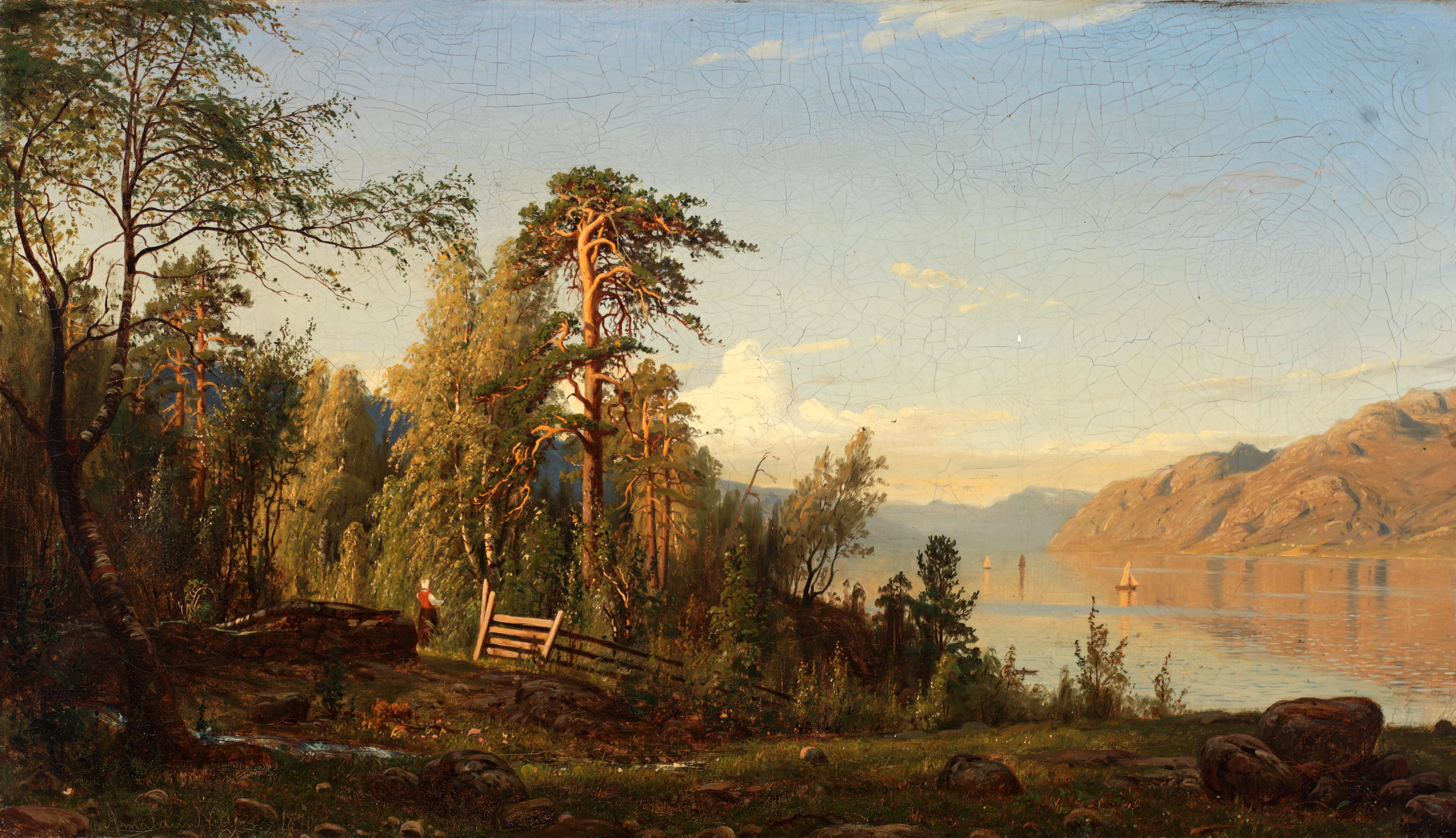
View of a Fjord (1890)

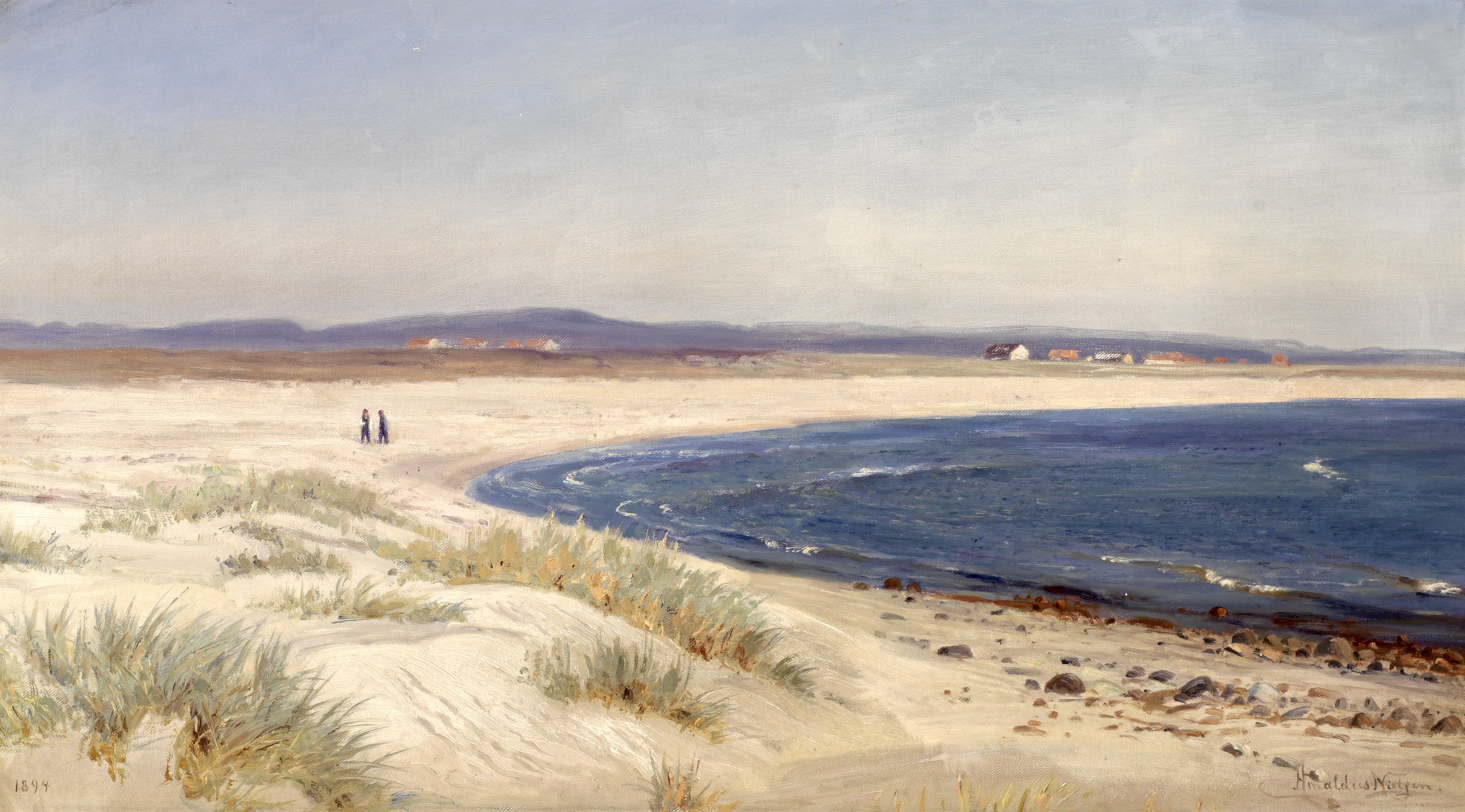
People on the Beach (1894)

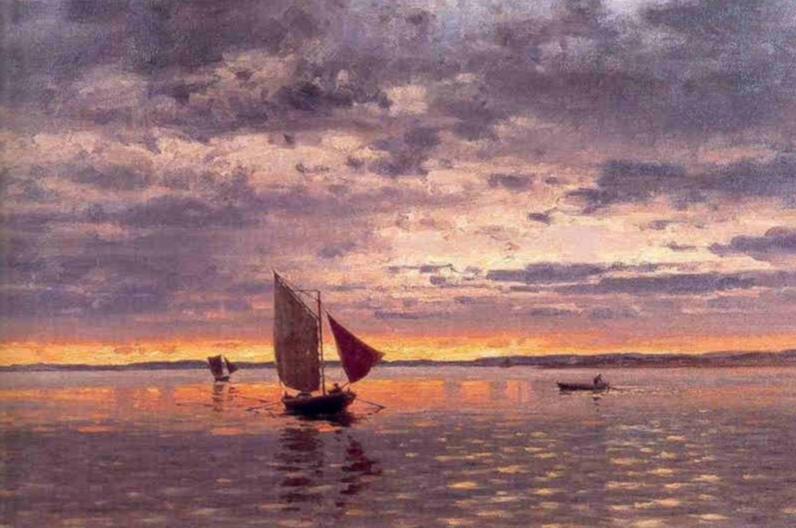
Evening at Frederiksstad (1909)
