= Per Fronth =

- Born: Per Fronth Nygaard; 24 November 1963 (age 62) Kristiansand, Norway
- Areas: Visual artist; Contemporary Art

Per Fronth (formerly named Per Fronth Nygaard, born 24 November 1963 in Kristiansand, Norway) is a Norwegian photojournalist, painter and photographer. Fronth is working with photography as his raw material. Then he creates and digests the photographs as a painter. The themes he shows in his photographs, are emerging as a component in the understanding of his works. Fronth is mainly dealing with large formats. Particularly in recent years he has concentrated on monumental commissions. Fronth has lived for extended periods of his life in New York City, where he also has sold many of his pictures.

His works are in permanent collections, such as the French Biblioteque Nationale in Paris, the Norwegian Sørlandets Art Museum as well as in numerous public collections, such as the Confederation of Norwegian Enterprise (NHO), Ekebergrestauranten and MGM Grand Las Vegas in the US. He has held several large exhibitions in New York, in addition to Oslo, Kristiansand, London, Copenhagen and Chicago. He has produced several controversial while successful exhibitions with topics such as rainforest people's struggle for their penhagenrights in the Amazonas, Brazil ( "Xingu Chronicles" in New York 1998), the fox hunt in England which is now prohibited ( "Bloodlinjes" in London in 2000) and "Theatre of War" in 2009, which put the spotlight on Norwegian soldiers in Afghanistan.

In 2009 he was selected to create the diploma for the Nobel Peace Prize that later the same the year was awarded to US President Barack Obama. Fronth is the first photographic artist who has had this task.

Per Fronth is a film director. In addition to having won several awards such as PDN PhotoPlus International Conferences Grand Prize and Short Films International Film Festival, both in New York, his short films Ode to a Hunter (2000) and Godiva (2001) have been invited to the official programs of film festivals Berlin, Toronto and Sundance Film festival.
