= Per Ung =

Norwegian sculptor and graphic artist

- Born: 5 June 1933; Oslo, Norway
- Died: 20 June 2013 (aged 80); Oslo, Norway
- Education: Norwegian National Academy of Fine Arts; Saint Martin's School of Art
- Occupation: Sculptor
- Parents: Per Ohlsen (father); and Randi Tangen (mother)
- Awards: Order of St. Olav (2007)

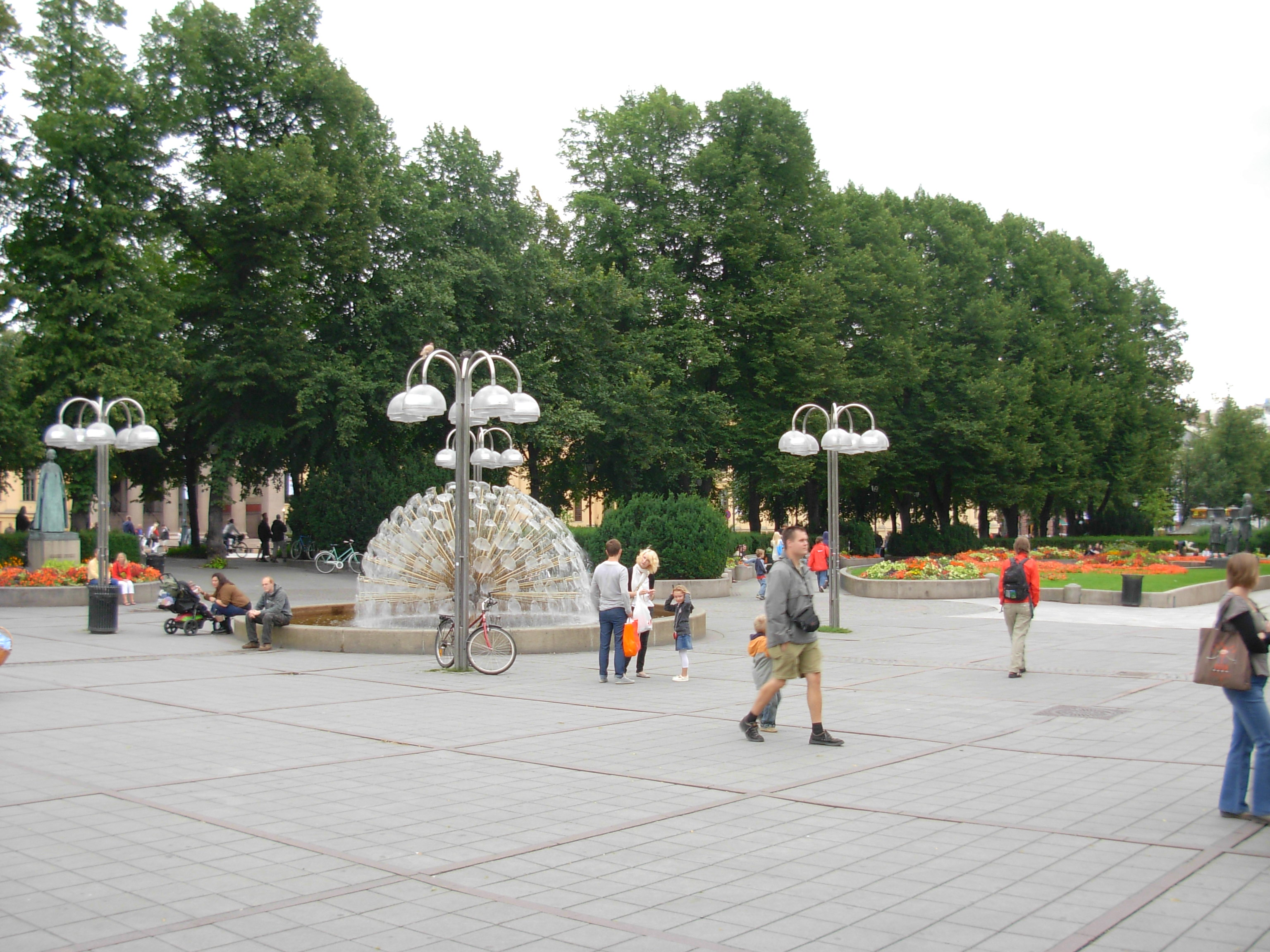
Johanne Dybwads plass. Per Ung's statue can be seen to the far left.

Per Ung (5 June 1933 – 20 June 2013) was a Norwegian sculptor and graphic artist.

== Biography ==
Ung was born in Oslo, Norway. He was the son of Per Ohlsen (1907–85) and Randi Tangen (1905-89). He was schooled in the conservative sculptural tradition but gradually distanced himself from formal and substantive traditionalism. He received his sculptor education under the influential of Per Palle Storm (1910–1994) at the Norwegian National Academy of Fine Arts from 1952-55. He became a student of Anthony Caro (1924–2013) at St. Martin's School of Art in London in 1960.

Ung made a number of public portrait statues and monuments, most of them on private assignments. His first large public commission was the statue of actress Johanne Dybwad (bronze. 1959), located on Johanne Dybwads plass outside the National Theatre in Oslo. His monument of figure skater Sonja Henie ( (bronze. 1985) is located at Frogner stadion. His statue of Nobel Prize laureate Fridtjof Nansen (bronze. 1993) is placed outside the Fram building at Bygdøy. A monument of the composer Johan Halvorsen (bronze. 2002) is placed outside the National Theatre in Oslo.

Ung was member and served as chairman of the Norwegian Association of Sculptors (Norsk Billedhuggerforening), was a member of the Young Artists Society (Unge Kunstneres Samfund) and served on the Board of Supervisors of Kunstnernes Hus in Oslo from 1967-69. He was granted the A. C. Houens legat in 1953, Conrad Mohrs legat in 1958 and 1964, Moltzaus legat in 1957 and Lorch-Schives legat in 1960. He received the Ingeborg og Per Palle Storms ærespris in 1995. In 2007, he was appointed Knight 1st Class in the Order of St. Olav.

== Personal life ==
He was married in 1953 to Valerie Lyndall Dick, marriage dissolved 1987. He was married in 1987 with sculptor Elena Engelsen-Wisse, daughter of woodcarver and illustrator Henning Engelsen (1918–2005). Per Ung died of cancer in Oslo during 2013 at the age of 80.

== Selected works ==
- Korsfestet (bronze. 1970) Tasta Church, Stavanger
- Kvinne og måker (bronze. 1974) Etterstad videregående skole, Oslo
- Eros og Psyke (bronze. 1982) Veterinærhøgskolen, Oslo
- Fiskerkone (bronze. 1999) Svolvær
- Otto Sverdrup (bronze. 1999) Sandvika, Bærum
- Fru Fortuna (bronze. 2005) Europarådets plass, Oslo

== See also ==
- Oslo Astrological Clock
