= Christian Ringnes =

Norwegian businessman and art collector

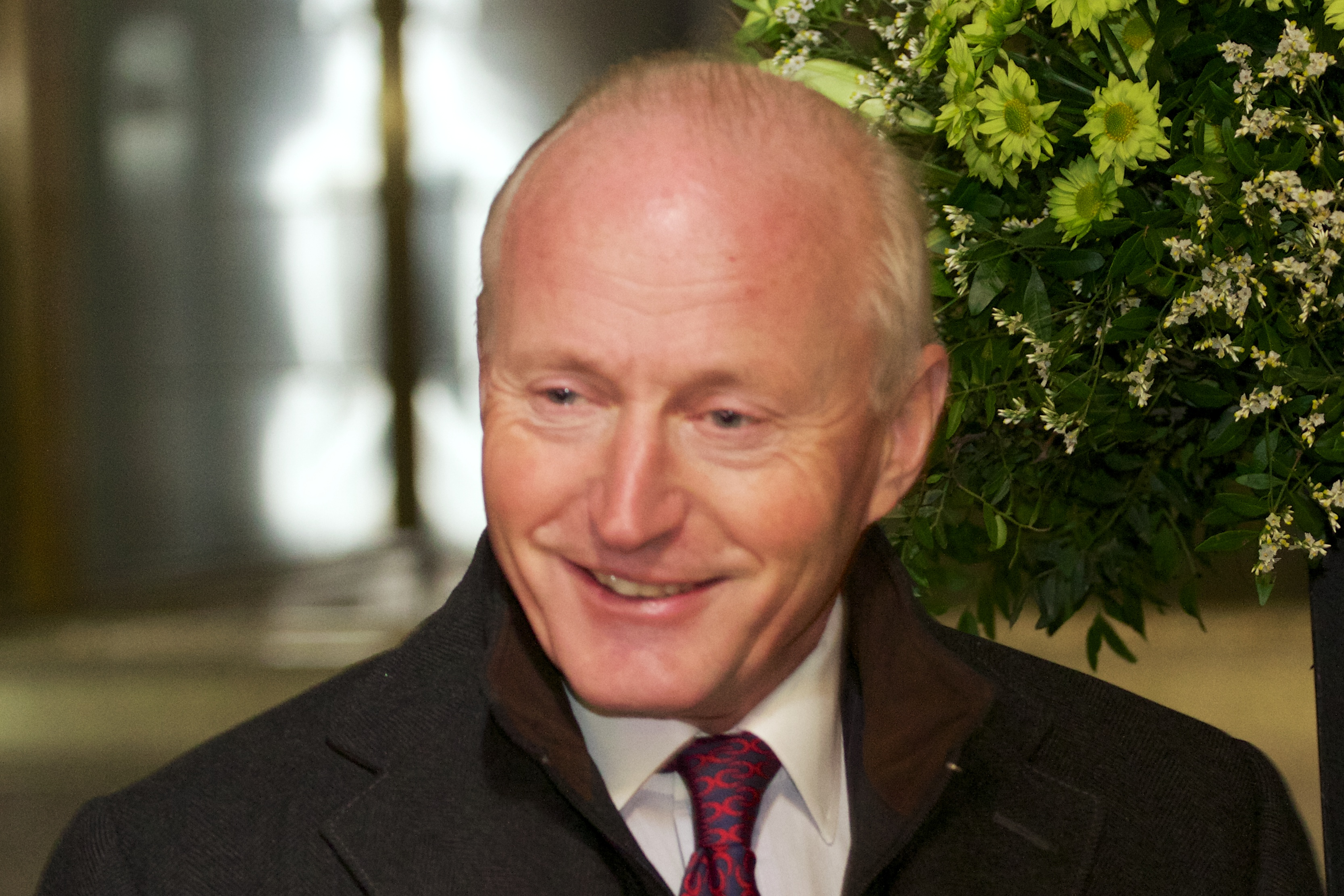
- Christian Ringnes (2014)
- Born: March 3, 1954 (age 71); Oslo
- Occupations: Businessman, investor

Christian Ringnes (born 3 March 1954) is a Norwegian businessman and art collector whose family founded Norway’s now largest brewery Ringnes in 1876. In his hometown of Oslo, Ringnes owns restaurants, hotels and museums, and recently donated more than $70 million for the creation of a large sculpture and cultural park, which opened in 2013. The Wall Street Journal ranks it as one of the top five parks in the world. Over decades Ringnes has built one of the largest private collections of art in the world.

Ringnes holds an MBA from the University of Lausanne in Switzerland and an MBA from Harvard Business School in the United States. He has been an active real estate investor since 1984, and is currently the largest shareholder and CEO of real estate companies Eiendomsspar and Victoria Eiendom.

In 2001 he bought the dilapidated Ekeberg Restaurant in Oslo, not far from the place where Edvard Munch painted The Scream. He renovated it and opened the restaurant in 2005. He has also given Oslo the sculptures Peacock Fountain at the National Theatre station and Kate Moss at the Opera Passage. The Marketing Association in Oslo appointed Ringnes to "Oslo Ambassador " for his efforts to promote Oslo as a city and destination. In 2005 he was awarded the honorary award "City Patriot " by Oslo. In 2013 he was voted "citizen of the year " by the readers of Norway's largest media outlet Aftenposten.

At the age of seven, Ringnes developed a hobby after he received an unusual gift from his father: a half-empty Gordon's Gin miniature liquor bottle. It was this afterthought of a gift that led him on a path towards amassing what is recognized today as the largest mini-bottle collection in the world with over 52,000 miniature liquor bottles commissioned to a three-story museum in Oslo.

== See also ==
- Oslo Astrological Clock
