= Marnardal Municipality =

Former municipality in Vest-Agder, Norway

Marnardal Municipality Marnardal kommune
- Former municipality
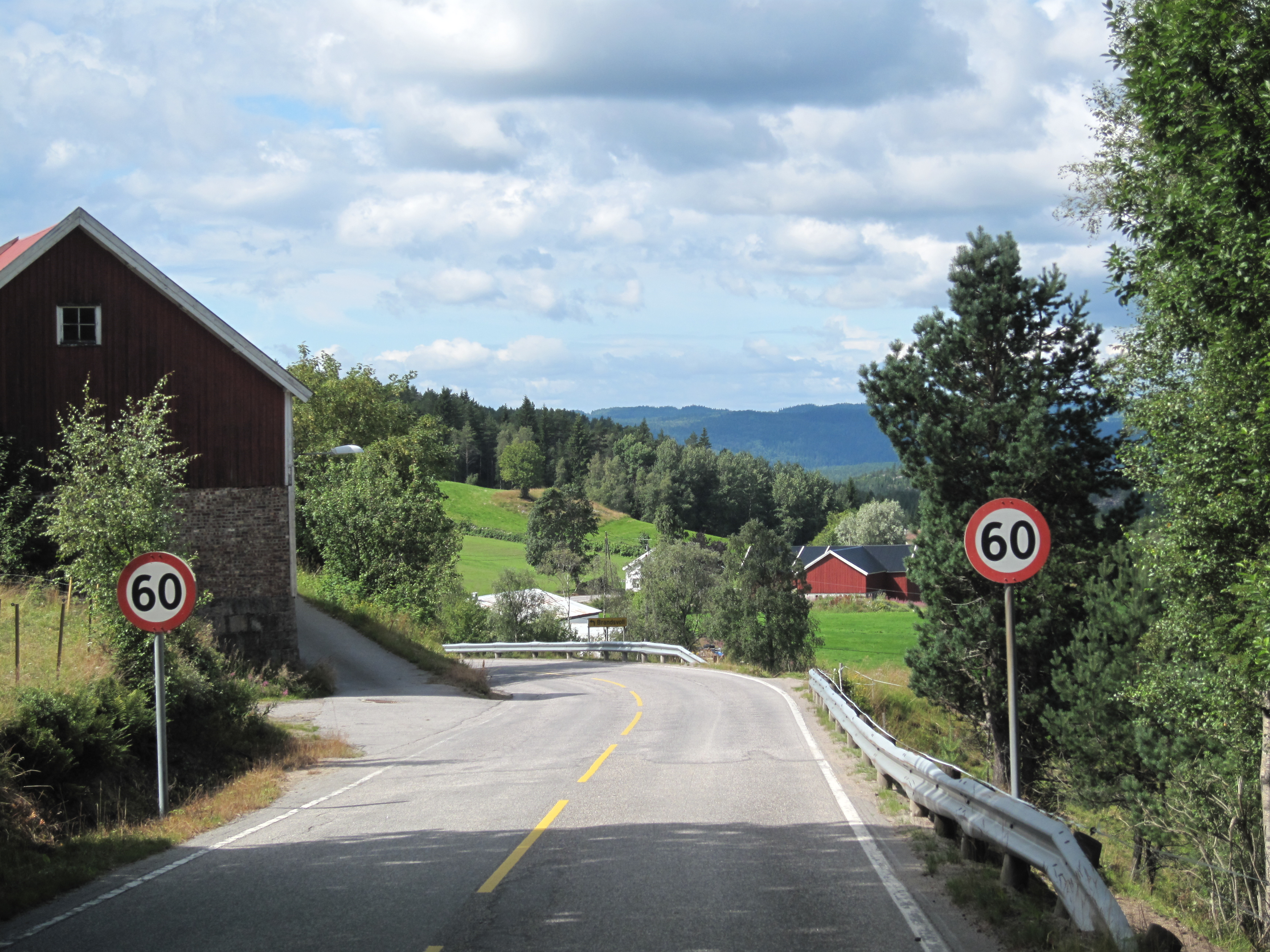
- View of the Marnardal area

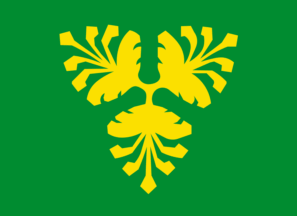
- Flag Coat of arms

- Vest-Agder within Norway

- Marnardal within Vest-Agder
- Coordinates: 58°14′34″N 07°29′49″E
- Country: Norway
- County: Vest-Agder
- District: Sørlandet
- Established: 1 Jan 1964
  - Preceded by: Laudal Municipality and Øyslebø Municipality
- Disestablished: 1 Jan 2020
  - Succeeded by: Lindesnes Municipality
- Administrative centre: Heddeland

Government
  - Mayor (2007–2019): Helge Sandåker (Ap)

Area (upon dissolution)
  - Total: 395.01 km^{2} (152.51 sq mi)
  - Land: 375.89 km^{2} (145.13 sq mi)
  - Water: 19.12 km^{2} (7.38 sq mi) 4.8%
  - Rank: #240 in Norway
- Highest elevation: 511.7 m (1,679 ft)

Population (2019)
  - Total: 2,297
  - Rank: #306 in Norway
  - Density: 6.1/km^{2} (16/sq mi)
  - Change (10 years): ▲ +3.3%
- Demonym: Marnardøl

Official language
  - Norwegian form: Neutral
- Time zone: UTC+01:00 (CET)
  - Summer (DST): UTC+02:00 (CEST)
- ISO 3166 code: NO-1021

Marnardal is a former municipality in the old Vest-Agder county, Norway. The 395-square-kilometre (153 sq mi) municipality existed from 1964 until its dissolution in 2020. The area is now part of Lindesnes Municipality in the traditional district of Sørlandet in Agder county. The administrative centre was the village of Heddeland. Other villages in the municipality included Bjelland, Breland, Koland, Laudal, and Øyslebø. The Sørlandet Railway Line runs through the municipality stopping at Breland Station and Marnardal Station.

Prior to its dissolution in 2020, the 395.01-square-kilometre (152.51 sq mi) municipality was the 240th largest by area out of the 422 municipalities in Norway. Marnardal Municipality was the 306th most populous municipality in Norway with a population of about 2,297. The municipality's population density was 6.1 inhabitants per square kilometre (16/sq mi) and its population had increased by 3.3% over the previous 10-year period.

== General information ==
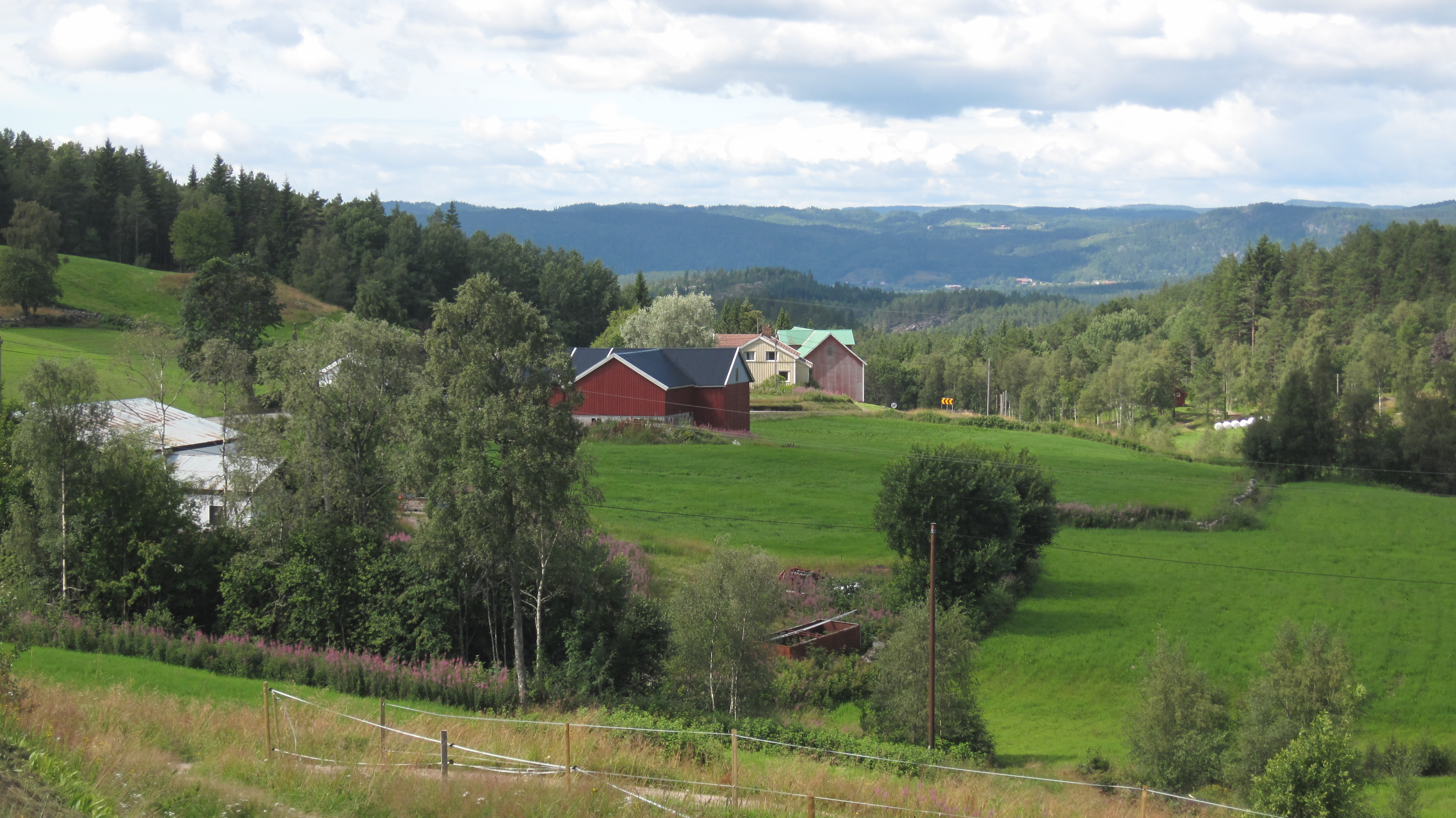
View around the Koland area

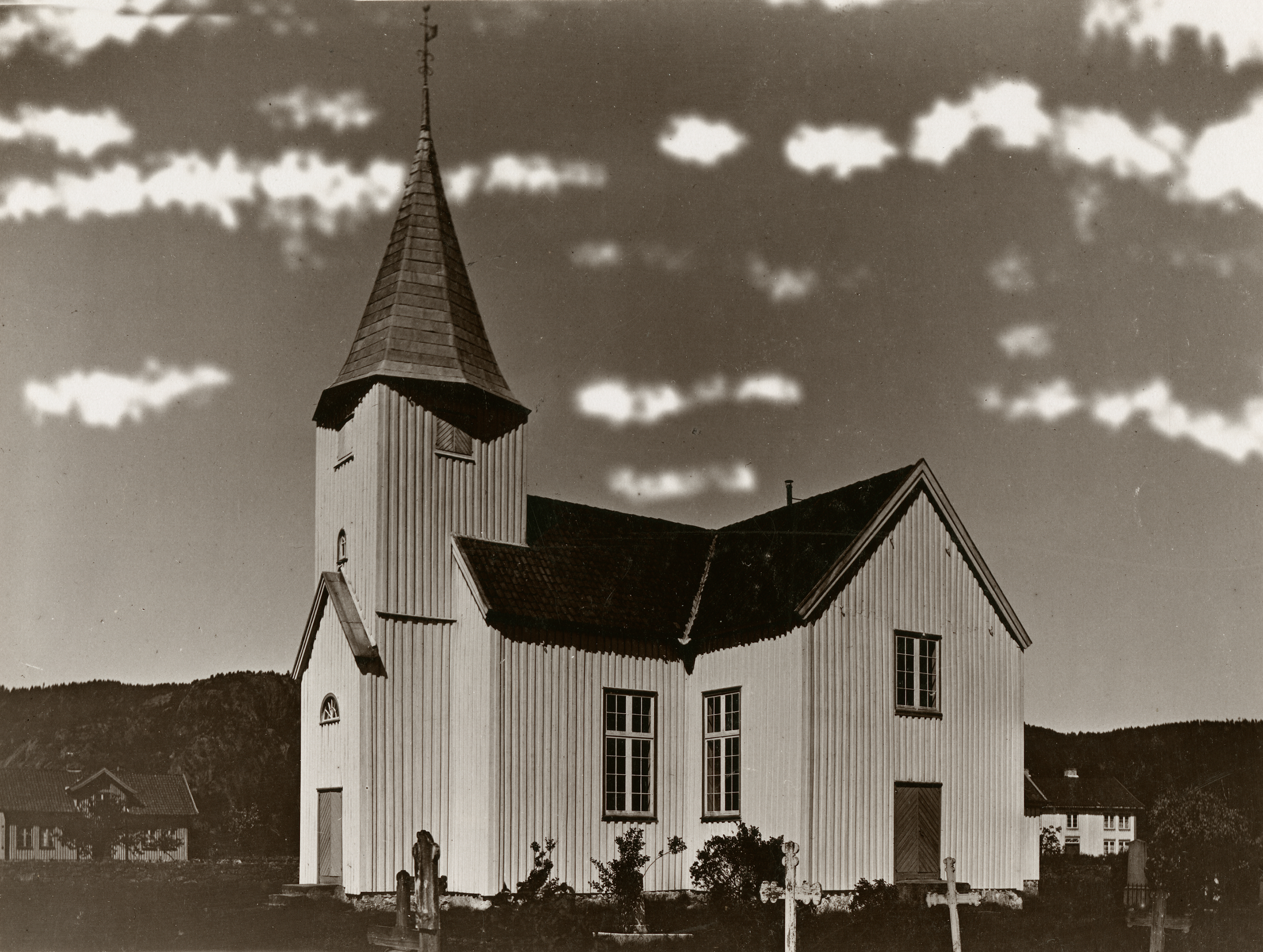
View of Øyslebø Church

During the 1960s, there were many municipal mergers across Norway due to the work of the Schei Committee. Marnardal Municipality was established as a new municipality on 1 January 1964 through the merger of the following areas:

- all of Laudal Municipality (population: 560)
- most of Øyslebø Municipality (population: 1,068), except for the Brunvatne area which became part of Søgne Municipality
- most of Bjelland Municipality (population: 535), except for the Midtbø and Ågedal areas which became part of Audnedal Municipality
- the Kleveland bru area of Finsland Municipality (population: 34), the rest of Finsland Municipality joined the new Songdalen Municipality

On 15 May 2019, the 0.7-square-kilometre (0.27 sq mi) Åsan farm (population: 4) was transferred from Marnardal Municipality to Songdalen Municipality.

On 1 January 2020, another major municipal merger took place when the following areas were merged to form a much larger Lindesnes Municipality with its administrative centre being the town of Mandal:

- all of Mandal Municipality (population: 15,659)
- all of Marnardal Municipality (population: 2,309)
- all of Lindesnes Municipality (population: 4,953)

=== Name ===
The municipality is named after the Mandalen valley (Old Norse: Marnardalr) in an attempt to revive the Old Norse name for the valley. The first element is the genitive case of the river name Mǫrn which is now called Mandalselva. The meaning of this old river name is uncertain, but it may be derived from the word marr which means "sea". The last element is dalr which means "valley" or "dale".

=== Coat of arms ===
The coat of arms was granted on 19 June 1987 until the municipality was dissolved on 1 January 2020. The official blazon is "Vert, three pine cones in pall stems conjoined Or" (Norwegian: I grønt tre gull furukongler forent i trepass). This means the arms have a green field (background) and the charge is a pine cone. The pine cones have a tincture of Or which means it is commonly colored yellow, but if it is made out of metal, then gold is used. The green color in the field and the choice of pine cones on the arms symbolize the importance of the forests which cover areas of the municipality. There are three conjoined pine cones to represent each of the three former municipalities of Bjelland, Laudal, and Øyslebø which were merged into Marnardal in 1964. The arms were designed by Ulf Dreyer using an idea by Kjersti Tveit Nilsen. The municipal flag has the same design as the coat of arms.

=== Churches ===
The Church of Norway has three parishes (sokn) within Marnardal Municipality. It is part of the Mandal prosti (deanery) in the Diocese of Agder og Telemark.

Churches in Marnardal Municipality
Parish (sokn)	Church name	Location of the church	Year built
Bjelland	Bjelland Church	Bjelland	1793
Laudal	Laudal Church	Laudal	1826
Øyslebø	Øyslebø Church	Øyslebø	1797

== Government ==
While it existed, Marnardal Municipality was responsible for primary education (through 10th grade), outpatient health services, senior citizen services, welfare and other social services, zoning, economic development, and municipal roads and utilities. The municipality was governed by a municipal council of directly elected representatives. The mayor was indirectly elected by a vote of the municipal council. The municipality was under the jurisdiction of the Kristiansand District Court and the Agder Court of Appeal.

=== Municipal council ===
The municipal council (Kommunestyre) of Marnardal Municipality was made up of 21 representatives that were elected to four year terms. The tables below show the historical composition of the council by political party.

Marnardal kommunestyre 2015–2019
Party name (in Norwegian)	Number of representatives
Labour Party (Arbeiderpartiet)	9
Progress Party (Fremskrittspartiet)	1
Conservative Party (Høyre)	3
Christian Democratic Party (Kristelig Folkeparti)	3
Centre Party (Senterpartiet)	5
Total number of members:	21
Note: On 1 January 2020, Marnardal Municipality became part of Lindesnes Municipality.

Marnardal kommunestyre 2011–2015
Party name (in Norwegian)	Number of representatives
Labour Party (Arbeiderpartiet)	8
Progress Party (Fremskrittspartiet)	2
Conservative Party (Høyre)	3
Christian Democratic Party (Kristelig Folkeparti)	3
Centre Party (Senterpartiet)	4
Liberal Party (Venstre)	1
Total number of members:	21

Marnardal kommunestyre 2007–2011
Party name (in Norwegian)	Number of representatives
Labour Party (Arbeiderpartiet)	6
Progress Party (Fremskrittspartiet)	2
Conservative Party (Høyre)	3
Christian Democratic Party (Kristelig Folkeparti)	3
Centre Party (Senterpartiet)	6
Liberal Party (Venstre)	1
Total number of members:	21

Marnardal kommunestyre 2003–2007
Party name (in Norwegian)	Number of representatives
Labour Party (Arbeiderpartiet)	7
Conservative Party (Høyre)	3
Christian Democratic Party (Kristelig Folkeparti)	3
Centre Party (Senterpartiet)	6
Liberal Party (Venstre)	2
Total number of members:	21

Marnardal kommunestyre 1999–2003
Party name (in Norwegian)	Number of representatives
Labour Party (Arbeiderpartiet)	5
Progress Party (Fremskrittspartiet)	2
Conservative Party (Høyre)	3
Christian Democratic Party (Kristelig Folkeparti)	4
Centre Party (Senterpartiet)	5
Liberal Party (Venstre)	2
Total number of members:	21

Marnardal kommunestyre 1995–1999
Party name (in Norwegian)	Number of representatives
Labour Party (Arbeiderpartiet)	5
Conservative Party (Høyre)	2
Christian Democratic Party (Kristelig Folkeparti)	3
Centre Party (Senterpartiet)	9
Liberal Party (Venstre)	2
Total number of members:	21

Marnardal kommunestyre 1991–1995
Party name (in Norwegian)	Number of representatives
Labour Party (Arbeiderpartiet)	4
Conservative Party (Høyre)	3
Christian Democratic Party (Kristelig Folkeparti)	2
Centre Party (Senterpartiet)	8
Liberal Party (Venstre)	1
Marnardal local list (Marnardal bygdeliste)	3
Total number of members:	21

Marnardal kommunestyre 1987–1991
Party name (in Norwegian)	Number of representatives
Labour Party (Arbeiderpartiet)	5
Conservative Party (Høyre)	4
Christian Democratic Party (Kristelig Folkeparti)	3
Centre Party (Senterpartiet)	4
Joint list of the Liberal Party (Venstre) and Liberal People's Party (Liberale Folkepartiet)	2
Marnardal local list (Marnardal Bygdeliste)	3
Total number of members:	21

Marnardal kommunestyre 1983–1987
Party name (in Norwegian)	Number of representatives
Labour Party (Arbeiderpartiet)	5
Conservative Party (Høyre)	3
Christian Democratic Party (Kristelig Folkeparti)	3
Centre Party (Senterpartiet)	5
Joint list of the Liberal Party (Venstre) and Liberal People's Party (Liberale Folkepartiet)	1
Marnardal local list (Marnardal Bygdelista)	4
Total number of members:	21

Marnardal kommunestyre 1979–1983
Party name (in Norwegian)	Number of representatives
Labour Party (Arbeiderpartiet)	4
Conservative Party (Høyre)	3
Christian Democratic Party (Kristelig Folkeparti)	3
Centre Party (Senterpartiet)	6
Joint list of the Liberal Party (Venstre) and New People's Party (Nye Folkepartiet)	1
Marnardal local list (Marnardal bygdeliste)	4
Total number of members:	21

Marnardal kommunestyre 1975–1979
Party name (in Norwegian)	Number of representatives
Labour Party (Arbeiderpartiet)	6
Conservative Party (Høyre)	2
Christian Democratic Party (Kristelig Folkeparti)	4
New People's Party (Nye Folkepartiet)	1
Centre Party (Senterpartiet)	7
Cross-party list (Tverrpolitisk Liste)	1
Total number of members:	21

Marnardal kommunestyre 1971–1975
Party name (in Norwegian)	Number of representatives
Labour Party (Arbeiderpartiet)	7
Conservative Party (Høyre)	1
Christian Democratic Party (Kristelig Folkeparti)	2
Centre Party (Senterpartiet)	8
Liberal Party (Venstre)	3
Total number of members:	21

Marnardal kommunestyre 1967–1971
Party name (in Norwegian)	Number of representatives
Labour Party (Arbeiderpartiet)	6
Conservative Party (Høyre)	1
Christian Democratic Party (Kristelig Folkeparti)	3
Centre Party (Senterpartiet)	7
Liberal Party (Venstre)	4
Total number of members:	21

Marnardal kommunestyre 1964–1967
Party name (in Norwegian)	Number of representatives
Labour Party (Arbeiderpartiet)	7
Christian Democratic Party (Kristelig Folkeparti)	2
Centre Party (Senterpartiet)	8
Liberal Party (Venstre)	4
Total number of members:	21

=== Mayors ===
The mayor (Norwegian: ordfører) of Marnardal Municipality was the political leader of the municipality and the chairperson of the municipal council. The following people have held this position:

- 1964–1967: Jørgen Fjellestad (V)
- 1967–1975: Magne Haraldstad (Sp)
- 1975–1979: Kristen Holmegård (Sp)
- 1979–1983: Magne Haraldstad (Sp)
- 1983–1987: Torgny Sandland (KrF)
- 1987–1991: Kjell Johnsen (H)
- 1991–1999: Åse Marit Bue (Sp)
- 1999–2007: Ånen Trygsland (Sp)
- 2007–2019: Helge Sandåker (Ap)

== Geography ==
Marnardal was an inland municipality which followed the Mandalselva river through the Mandalen valley. The municipality bordered Evje og Hornnes Municipality to the north in Aust-Agder county; Audnedal Municipality to the west; Lindesnes Municipality, Mandal Municipality, and Søgne Municipality to the south; and Songdalen Municipality and Vennesla Municipality in the east. The highest point in the municipality was the 511.7-metre (1,679 ft) tall mountain Ørteknappknuten in the northern part of the municipality.

=== Climate ===
Climate data for Bjelland
Month	Jan	Feb	Mar	Apr	May	Jun	Jul	Aug	Sep	Oct	Nov	Dec	Year
Daily mean °C (°F)	−2.5 (27.5)	−2.7 (27.1)	0.0 (32.0)	3.5 (38.3)	9.8 (49.6)	14.0 (57.2)	15.2 (59.4)	14.5 (58.1)	10.2 (50.4)	6.7 (44.1)	2.2 (36.0)	−1.0 (30.2)	5.8 (42.4)
Average precipitation mm (inches)	146 (5.7)	104 (4.1)	104 (4.1)	64 (2.5)	95 (3.7)	84 (3.3)	100 (3.9)	128 (5.0)	168 (6.6)	198 (7.8)	182 (7.2)	142 (5.6)	1,515 (59.6)
Source: Norwegian Meteorological Institute

== See also ==
- List of former municipalities of Norway
