= Øyslebø og Laudal Municipality =

Former municipality in Vest-Agder, Norway

Øyslebø og Laudal Municipality Øyslebø og Laudal herred
- Former municipality
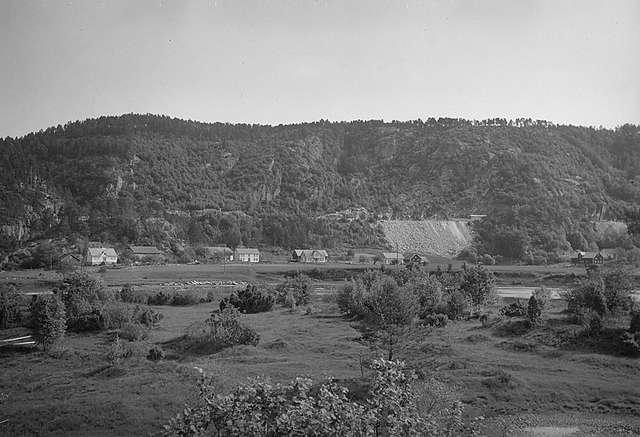
- View of Øyslebø

- Vest-Agder within Norway

- Øyslebø og Laudal within Vest-Agder
- Coordinates: 58°12′43″N 07°31′30″E
- Country: Norway
- County: Vest-Agder
- District: Sørlandet
- Established: 1 Jan 1838
  - Created as: Formannskapsdistrikt
- Disestablished: 1 Jan 1899
  - Succeeded by: Øyslebø Municipality and Laudal Municipality
- Administrative centre: Øyslebø

Government
  - Mayor (1896–1899): Ole Fuglestvedt

Area (upon dissolution)
  - Total: 250.4 km^{2} (96.7 sq mi)
- Highest elevation: 341 m (1,119 ft)

Population (1899)
  - Total: 1,827
  - Density: 7.296/km^{2} (18.90/sq mi)
- Demonym(s): Øyslebøfolk; Laudøl
- Time zone: UTC+01:00 (CET)
  - Summer (DST): UTC+02:00 (CEST)
- ISO 3166 code: NO-1021

Øyslebø og Laudal is a former municipality in the old Vest-Agder county, Norway. The 250.4-square-kilometre (96.7 sq mi) municipality existed from 1838 until its dissolution in 1899. The area is now part of Lindesnes Municipality in Agder county. The administrative centre was the village of Øyslebø where Øyslebø Church is located.

== General information ==
The parish of Øslebø og Løvdal (later spelled Øyslebø og Laudal) was established as a municipality on 1 January 1838 (see formannskapsdistrikt law). According to the 1835 census, the parish had a population of 1,895.

On 1 January 1899, Øyslebø og Laudal Municipality was dissolved and its lands were divided into two new municipalities: the northern district (population: 836) became the new Laudal Municipality and the southern district (population: 991) became the new Øyslebø Municipality.

=== Name ===
The parishes of Øyslebø and Laudal were merged in 1838 and the new, resulting municipality was given the compound name Øyslebø og Laudal, literally meaning "Øyslebø and Laudal".

The parish of Øyslebø is named after the old Øyslebø farm (Old Norse: Øyðslubœr) since the first Øyslebø Church was built there. The first element comes from the old name for the local river Øyðsla. The old river name was likely derived from the verb eyða which means "to destroy". The last element is bœr which means "farm" or "farmstead". Historically, the name was spelled Øslebø or Øislebø.

The parish of Laudal is named after the old Laudal farm (Old Norse: Laugardalr) since the first Laudal Church was built there. The first element of the name of the farm comes from the old name for the river, Laug, (now the Lågåna river). The old river name is identical to the word laug which means "bath". The last element is dalr which means "valley" or "dale". Therefore, the name means the bath river valley. Historically, the name was spelled Løvdal, using a more archaic spelling of the same name.

=== Churches ===
The Church of Norway had two parishes (sokn) within Øyslebø og Laudal Municipality. At the time of the municipal dissolution, it was part of the Holum prestegjeld and the Mandal prosti (deanery) in the Diocese of Agder.

Churches in Øyslebø og Laudal Municipality
Parish (sokn)	Church name	Location of the church	Year built
Laudal	Laudal Church	Laudal	1826
Øyslebø	Øyslebø Church	Øyslebø	1797

== Geography ==
The municipality was located in the lower Mandalen valley, through which the river Mandalselva flows. The highest point in the municipality was the 341-metre (1,119 ft) tall mountain Drivaasen (now spelled Drivåsen). Bjelland og Grindum Municipality was located to the north, Finsland Municipality and Øvrebø og Hægeland Municipality were located to the northeast, Søgne Municipality was located to the east, Holum Municipality was located to the south, Søndre Undal Municipality was located to the southwest, and Nordre Undal Municipality was located to the west.

== Government ==
While it existed, Øyslebø og Laudal Municipality was governed by a municipal council of directly elected representatives. The mayor was indirectly elected by a vote of the municipal council. The municipality was under the jurisdiction of the Mandal District Court and the Agder Court of Appeal.

=== Mayors ===
The mayor (Norwegian: ordfører) of Øyslebø og Laudal Municipality was the political leader of the municipality and the chairperson of the municipal council. The following people have held this position:

- 1838–1853: Bent Olsen Fuglestvedt
- 1854–1861: Ole Bent Heddeland
- 1862–1865: Rasmus Christensen Øslebø
- 1866–1877: Fredrik Tostensen Solaas (V)
- 1877–1879: Ole Fidje
- 1879–1891: Jørgen Tobias Torkjellsen Øslebø
- 1892–1895: Andreas Pettersen Nome
- 1896–1899: Ole Glambeksen Fuglestveit

== See also ==
- List of former municipalities of Norway
