= Laudal Municipality =

Former municipality in Vest-Agder, Norway

Laudal Municipality Laudal herad
- Former municipality
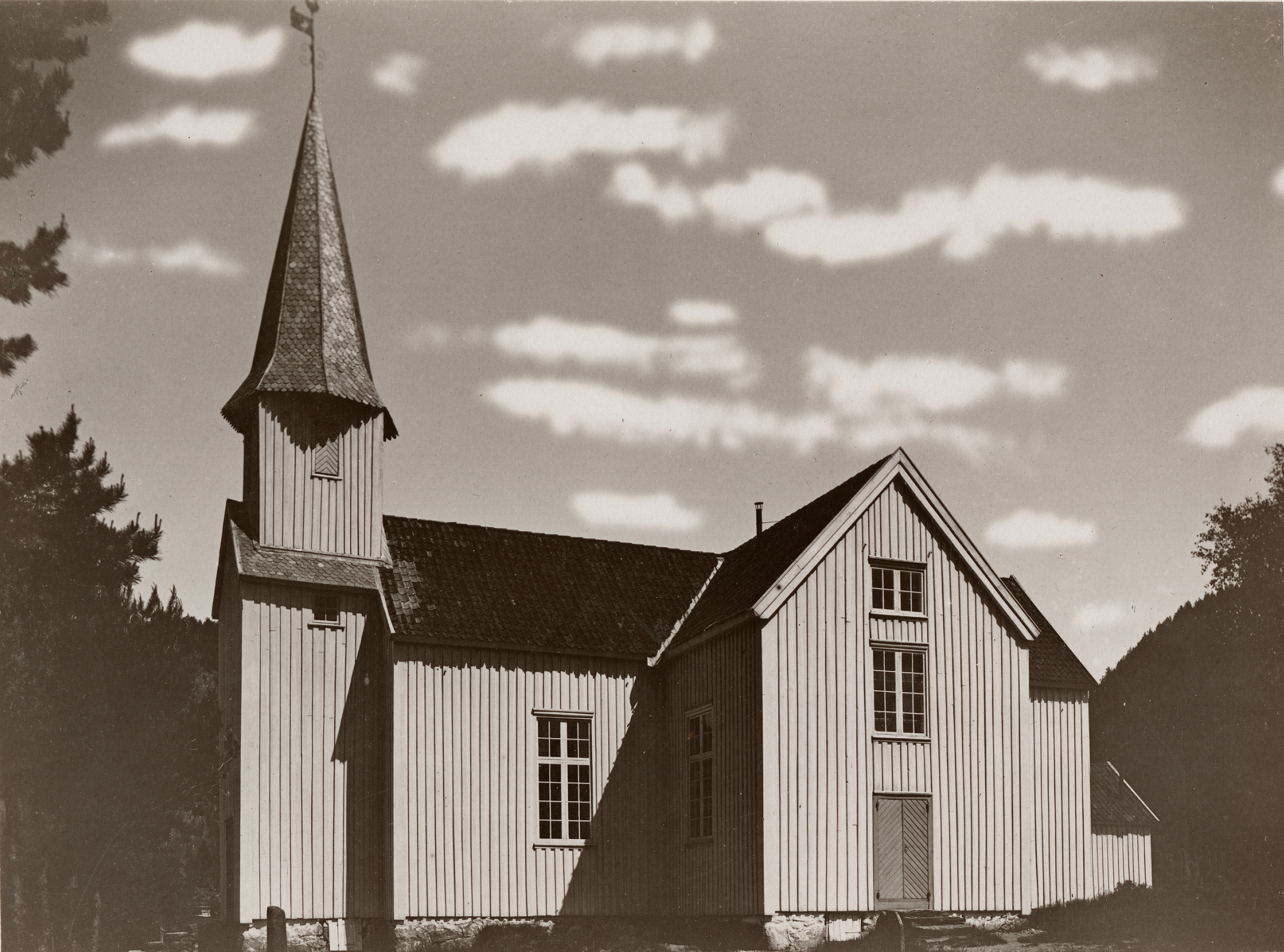
- View of the local Laudal Church

- Vest-Agder within Norway

- Laudal within Vest-Agder
- Coordinates: 58°14′49″N 07°30′16″E
- Country: Norway
- County: Vest-Agder
- District: Sørlandet
- Established: 1 Jan 1899
  - Preceded by: Øyslebø og Laudal Municipality
- Disestablished: 1 Jan 1964
  - Succeeded by: Marnardal Municipality
- Administrative centre: Laudal

Government
  - Mayor (1959–1963): Alf Tjomsland (Sp)

Area (upon dissolution)
  - Total: 93.2 km^{2} (36.0 sq mi)
  - Rank: #524 in Norway
- Highest elevation: 341 m (1,119 ft)

Population (1963)
  - Total: 581
  - Rank: #671 in Norway
  - Density: 6.2/km^{2} (16/sq mi)
  - Change (10 years): ▼ −21.4%
- Demonym: Laudøl

Official language
  - Norwegian form: Nynorsk
- Time zone: UTC+01:00 (CET)
  - Summer (DST): UTC+02:00 (CEST)
- ISO 3166 code: NO-1022

Laudal is a former municipality in the old Vest-Agder county, Norway. The 93.2-square-kilometre (36.0 sq mi) municipality existed from 1899 until its dissolution in 1964. The area is now part of Lindesnes Municipality in Agder county. The administrative centre was the village of Laudal where Laudal Church is located.

Prior to its dissolution in 1964, the 93.2-square-kilometre (36.0 sq mi) municipality was the 524th largest by area out of the 689 municipalities in Norway. Laudal Municipality was the 671st most populous municipality in Norway with a population of about 581. The municipality's population density was 6.2 inhabitants per square kilometre (16/sq mi) and its population had decreased by 21.4% over the previous 10-year period.

== General information ==
The municipality of Laudal was established on 1 January 1899 when the old Øyslebø og Laudal Municipality was divided into two: the northern district (population: 836) became the new Laudal Municipality and the southern district (population: 991) became the new Øyslebø Municipality.

During the 1960s, there were many municipal mergers across Norway due to the work of the Schei Committee. On 1 January 1964, Laudal Municipality was dissolved and the following areas were merged to form the new Marnardal Municipality:

- all of Laudal Municipality (population: 560)
- most of Bjelland Municipality (population: 535)
- most of Øyslebø Municipality (population: 1,068), except for the Brunvatne area which became part of Søgne Municipality
- the small Kleveland Bru area of Finsland Municipality (population: 40), with the rest of Finsland becoming part of the new Songdalen Municipality

=== Name ===
The municipality (originally the parish) is named after the old Laudal farm (Old Norse: Laugardalr) since the first Laudal Church was built there. The first element of the name of the farm comes from the old name for the river, Laug, (now the Lågåna river). The old river name is identical to the word laug which means "bath". The last element is dalr which means "valley" or "dale". Therefore, the name means the bath river valley. Historically, the name was spelled Løvdal, using a more archaic spelling of the same name.

=== Churches ===
The Church of Norway had one parish (sokn) within Laudal Municipality. At the time of the municipal dissolution, it was part of the Holum prestegjeld and the Mandal prosti (deanery) in the Diocese of Agder.

Churches in Laudal Municipality
Parish (sokn)	Church name	Location of the church	Year built
Laudal	Laudal Church	Laudal	1826

== Geography ==
The municipality was located in the Mandalen valley, through which the river Mandalselva flows. The highest point in the municipality was the 341-metre (1,119 ft) tall mountain Drivåsen, on the border with Øyslebø Municipality. Bjelland Municipality was located to the north, Finsland Municipality was located to the east, Øyslebø Municipality was located to the southeast, Vigmostad Municipality was located to the southwest, and Konsmo Municipality was located to the west.

== Government ==
While it existed, Laudal Municipality was responsible for primary education (through 10th grade), outpatient health services, senior citizen services, welfare and other social services, zoning, economic development, and municipal roads and utilities. The municipality was governed by a municipal council of directly elected representatives. The mayor was indirectly elected by a vote of the municipal council. The municipality was under the jurisdiction of the Mandal District Court and the Agder Court of Appeal.

=== Municipal council ===
The municipal council (Heradsstyre) of Laudal Municipality was made up of representatives that were elected to four year terms. The tables below show the historical composition of the council by political party.

Laudal heradsstyre 1959–1963
Party name (in Nynorsk)	Number of representatives
Labour Party (Arbeidarpartiet)	5
Joint List(s) of Non-Socialist Parties (Borgarlege Felleslister)	8
Total number of members:	13
Note: On 1 January 1964, Laudal Municipality became part of Marnardal Municipality.

Laudal heradsstyre 1955–1959
Party name (in Nynorsk)	Number of representatives
Labour Party (Arbeidarpartiet)	5
Joint List(s) of Non-Socialist Parties (Borgarlege Felleslister)	8
Total number of members:	13

Laudal heradsstyre 1951–1955
Party name (in Nynorsk)	Number of representatives
Labour Party (Arbeidarpartiet)	5
Joint List(s) of Non-Socialist Parties (Borgarlege Felleslister)	7
Total number of members:	12

Laudal heradsstyre 1947–1951
Party name (in Nynorsk)	Number of representatives
Labour Party (Arbeidarpartiet)	5
Joint List(s) of Non-Socialist Parties (Borgarlege Felleslister)	7
Total number of members:	12

Laudal heradsstyre 1945–1947
Party name (in Nynorsk)	Number of representatives
Labour Party (Arbeidarpartiet)	6
Farmers' Party (Bondepartiet)	3
Joint list of the Liberal Party (Venstre) and the Radical People's Party (Radikale Folkepartiet)	3
Total number of members:	12

Laudal heradsstyre 1937–1941*
Party name (in Nynorsk)	Number of representatives
Labour Party (Arbeidarpartiet)	5
Farmers' Party (Bondepartiet)	5
Liberal Party (Venstre)	2
Total number of members:	12
Note: Due to the German occupation of Norway during World War II, no elections were held for new municipal councils until after the war ended in 1945.

=== Mayors ===
The mayor (Nynorsk: ordførar) of Laudal Municipality was the political leader of the municipality and the chairperson of the municipal council. The following people have held this position:

- 1899–1904: Knut Tobiassen Lauvdal
- 1904–1910: Ole O. Fidje
- 1911–1922: Knut Tobiassen Lauvdal
- 1922–1928: Gase Haraldstad
- 1928–1934: Aanen Haraldstad (Bp)
- 1934–1937: Ole Kristian Fidje (Bp)
- 1937–1940: Aanen Haraldstad (Bp)
- 1941–1943: Bjørgulf Rygnastad (NS)
- 1943–1945: Bjørn Homme (NS)
- 1945–1945: Gase Haraldstad
- 1946–1947: Søren Skuland (Ap)
- 1948–1959: Jørgen Fjellestad (Bp)
- 1959–1963: Alf Tjomsland (Sp)

== See also ==
- List of former municipalities of Norway
