= Øyslebø Municipality =

Former municipality in Vest-Agder, Norway

Øyslebø Municipality Øyslebø herad
- Former municipality
- Øislebø herred (historic name)
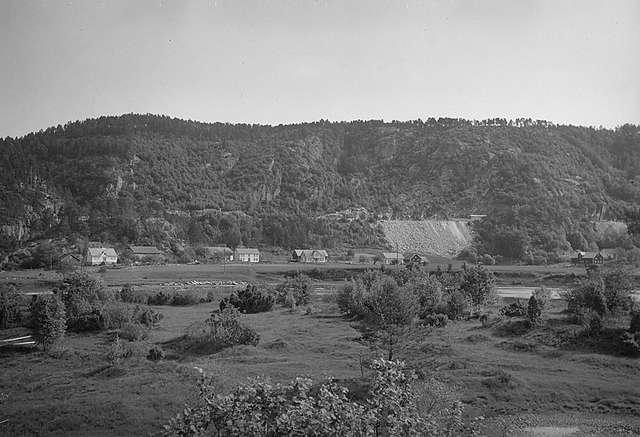
- View of Øyslebø

- Vest-Agder within Norway

- Øyslebø within Vest-Agder
- Coordinates: 58°10′10″N 07°33′15″E
- Country: Norway
- County: Vest-Agder
- District: Sørlandet
- Established: 1 Jan 1899
  - Preceded by: Øyslebø og Laudal Municipality
- Disestablished: 1 Jan 1964
  - Succeeded by: Marnardal Municipality
- Administrative centre: Øyslebø

Area (upon dissolution)
  - Total: 157.2 km^{2} (60.7 sq mi)
  - Rank: #429 in Norway
- Highest elevation: 341 m (1,119 ft)

Population (1963)
  - Total: 1,125
  - Rank: #596 in Norway
  - Density: 7.2/km^{2} (19/sq mi)
  - Change (10 years): ▲ +5.5%
- Demonym: Øyslebøfolk

Official language
  - Norwegian form: Nynorsk
- Time zone: UTC+01:00 (CET)
  - Summer (DST): UTC+02:00 (CEST)
- ISO 3166 code: NO-1021

Øyslebø is a former municipality in the old Vest-Agder county, Norway. The 157.2-square-kilometre (60.7 sq mi) municipality existed from 1899 until its dissolution in 1964. The area is now part of Lindesnes Municipality in Agder county. The administrative centre was the village of Øyslebø where Øyslebø Church is located.

Prior to its dissolution in 1964, the 157.2-square-kilometre (60.7 sq mi) municipality was the 429th largest by area out of the 689 municipalities in Norway. Øyslebø Municipality was the 596th most populous municipality in Norway with a population of about 1,125. The municipality's population density was 7.2 inhabitants per square kilometre (19/sq mi) and its population had increased by 5.5% over the previous 10-year period.

== General information ==
The municipality of Øyslebø was established on 1 January 1899 when the old Øyslebø og Laudal Municipality was divided into two: the southern district (population: 991) became the new Øyslebø Municipality and the northern district (population: 836) became the new Laudal Municipality.

During the 1960s, there were many municipal mergers across Norway due to the work of the Schei Committee. On 1 January 1964, the Brunvatne area (population: 44) was transferred to the neighboring Søgne Municipality. On the same date, the rest of Øyslebø Municipality was dissolved and the following areas were merged to form the new Marnardal Municipality:

- the remaining parts of Øyslebø Municipality (population: 1,068)
- all of Laudal Municipality (population: 560)
- most of Bjelland Municipality (population: 535)
- the small Kleveland Bru area of Finsland Municipality (population: 40), with the rest of Finsland becoming part of the new Songdalen Municipality

=== Name ===
The municipality (originally the parish) is named after the old Øyslebø farm (Old Norse: Øyðslubœr) since the first Øyslebø Church was built there. The first element comes from the old name for the local river Øyðsla. The old river name was likely derived from the verb eyða which means "to destroy". The last element is bœr which means "farm" or "farmstead".

Historically, the name of the municipality was spelled Øslebø or Øislebø. On 3 November 1917, a royal resolution changed the spelling of the name of the municipality to Øyslebø, using a more modern Norwegian spelling.

=== Churches ===
The Church of Norway had one parish (sokn) within Øyslebø Municipality. At the time of the municipal dissolution, it was part of the Holum prestegjeld and the Mandal prosti (deanery) in the Diocese of Agder.

Churches in Øyslebø Municipality
Parish (sokn)	Church name	Location of the church	Year built
Øyslebø	Øyslebø Church	Øyslebø	1797

== Geography ==
The municipality was located in the lower Mandalen valley, through which the river Mandalselva flows. The highest point in the municipality was the 341-metre (1,119 ft) tall mountain Drivåsen, on the border with Laudal Municipality. Finsland Municipality was located to the north, Øvrebø Municipality was located to the northeast, Greipstad Municipality was located to the east, Søgne Municipality was located to the southeast, Holum Municipality was located to the south, Sør-Audnedal Municipality was located to the southwest, Vigmostad Municipality was located to the west, and Laudal Municipality was located to the northwest.

== Government ==
While it existed, Øyslebø Municipality was responsible for primary education (through 10th grade), outpatient health services, senior citizen services, welfare and other social services, zoning, economic development, and municipal roads and utilities. The municipality was governed by a municipal council of directly elected representatives. The mayor was indirectly elected by a vote of the municipal council. The municipality was under the jurisdiction of the Mandal District Court and the Agder Court of Appeal.

=== Municipal council ===
The municipal council (Heradsstyre) of Øyslebø Municipality was made up of representatives that were elected to four year terms. The tables below show the historical composition of the council by political party.

Øyslebø heradsstyre 1959–1963
Party name (in Nynorsk)	Number of representatives
Labour Party (Arbeidarpartiet)	6
Christian Democratic Party (Kristeleg Folkeparti)	1
Centre Party (Senterpartiet)	6
Liberal Party (Venstre)	4
Total number of members:	17
Note: On 1 January 1964, Øyslebø Municipality became part of Marnardal Municipality.

Øyslebø heradsstyre 1955–1959
Party name (in Nynorsk)	Number of representatives
Labour Party (Arbeidarpartiet)	6
Farmers' Party (Bondepartiet)	8
Liberal Party (Venstre)	3
Total number of members:	17

Øyslebø heradsstyre 1951–1955
Party name (in Nynorsk)	Number of representatives
Labour Party (Arbeidarpartiet)	6
Joint List(s) of Non-Socialist Parties (Borgarlege Felleslister)	10
Total number of members:	16

Øyslebø heradsstyre 1947–1951
Party name (in Nynorsk)	Number of representatives
Labour Party (Arbeidarpartiet)	6
Joint List(s) of Non-Socialist Parties (Borgarlege Felleslister)	10
Total number of members:	16

Øyslebø heradsstyre 1945–1947
Party name (in Nynorsk)	Number of representatives
Labour Party (Arbeidarpartiet)	7
Joint List(s) of Non-Socialist Parties (Borgarlege Felleslister)	9
Total number of members:	16

Øyslebø heradsstyre 1937–1941*
Party name (in Nynorsk)	Number of representatives
Labour Party (Arbeidarpartiet)	7
Joint list of the Farmers' Party (Bondepartiet) and the Liberal Party (Venstre)	9
Total number of members:	16
Note: Due to the German occupation of Norway during World War II, no elections were held for new municipal councils until after the war ended in 1945.

=== Mayors ===
The mayor (Nynorsk: ordførar) of Øyslebø Municipality was the political leader of the municipality and the chairperson of the municipal council. The following people have held this position:

- 1899–1901: Ole Glambeksen Fuglestveit
- 1902–1904: Christen Olsen Øislebø
- 1905–1916: Askjell Olsen Usland
- 1917–1922: Andreas Pettersen Nome
- 1923–1929: Syvert Stiansen Skjævesland
- 1929–1934: Asbjørn Olsen Øyslebø
- 1935–1941: Syvert Stiansen Skjævesland
- 1941–1945: Alfred Høye (NS)
- 1945–1945: Syvert Stiansen Skjævesland
- 1946–1963: Thore Andreassen Nome

== See also ==
- List of former municipalities of Norway
