= Ålo =

Village in Kristiansand Municipality, Norway

- Village
- Interactive map of Ålo
- Coordinates: 58.04878°N 7.69399°E
- Country: Norway
- Region: Southern Norway
- County: Agder
- Municipality: Kristiansand Municipality
- Elevation: 3 m (9.8 ft)
- Time zone: UTC+01:00 (CET)
  - Summer (DST): UTC+02:00 (CEST)
- Post Code: 4641 Søgne

Ålo is a village in Kristiansand Municipality in Agder county, Norway. The village is located on the west side of the mouth of the Trysfjorden, about 2 kilometres (1.2 mi) southwest of the village of Trysnes and about 5 kilometres (3.1 mi) east of the village of Harkmark in the neighboring Lindesnes Municipality.
