= Haraldstad =

Surname list

Haraldstad is a Norwegian surname. Notable people with the surname include:

- Kjetil-Vidar Haraldstad (born 1973), Norwegian black metal drummer
- Magne Haraldstad (1937–2008), Norwegian politician
