= Trysfjorden =

Fjord in Agder, Norway

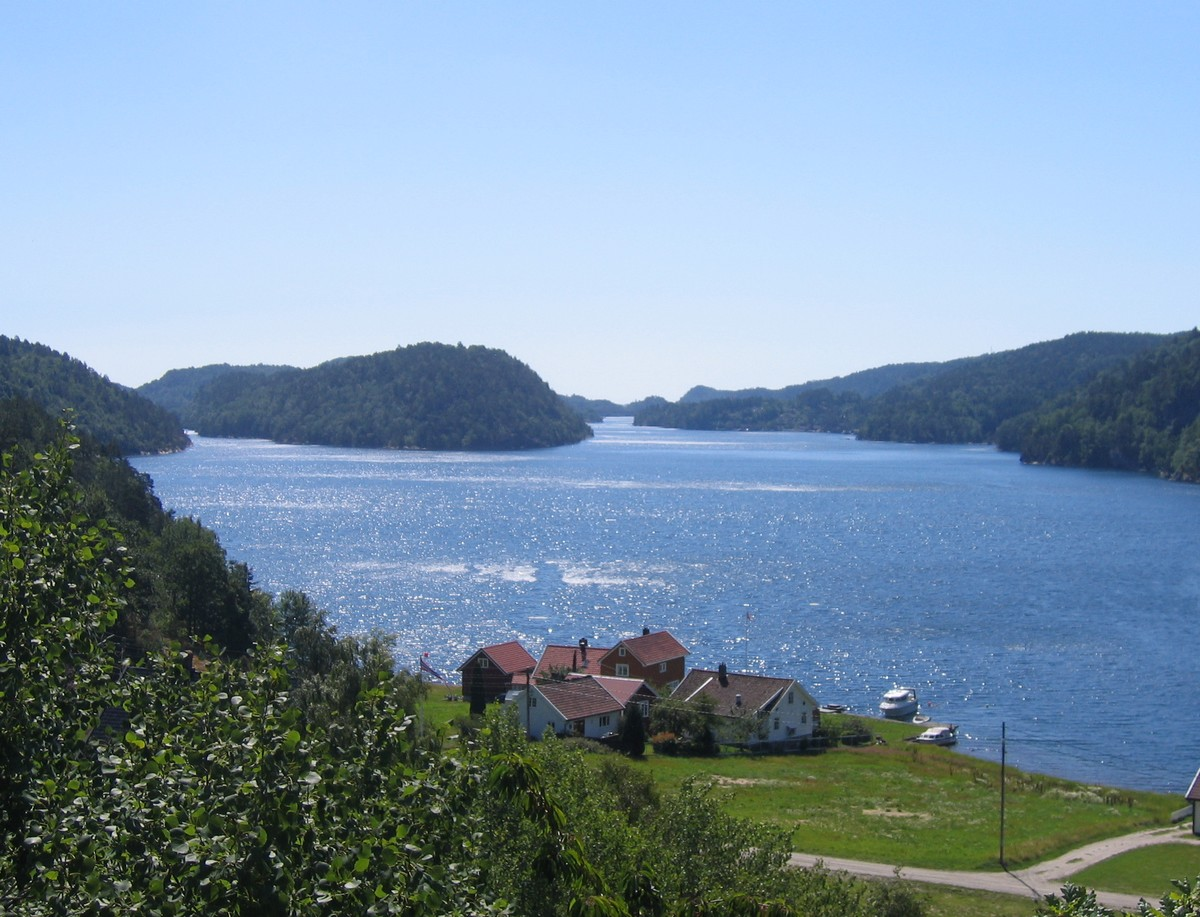
- View of the fjord
- Location: Agder county, Norway
- Coordinates: 58.0885°N 07.6813°E
- Type: Fjord
- Primary outflows: Skagerrak
- Basin countries: Norway
- Max. length: 6.5 kilometres (4.0 mi)
- Settlements: Trysnes, Ålo

Location
- Interactive map of the fjord

Trysfjorden is a fjord located in Kristiansand Municipality in Agder county, Norway. The mouth of the 6.5-kilometre (4.0 mi) long fjord sits just west of the village of Trysnes and just northeast of the village of Ålo. The European route E39 highway runs along the inner part of the fjord, just west of the village of Lohne.

The deepest parts of the fjord reach about 85 metres (279 ft) deep. In the mud at the bottom, scientists have discovered crustaceans that they believe are indigenous to the bay. Trysfjorden has several islands and islets. The islets of Storholmen, Notholmen, and Urholmen lie just outside of Røsstad. Near the villages of Trysnes and Lastad lies the island of Lastadholmen which in recent years has had the largest colony of terns in Southern Norway. The mouth of the fjord lies just south of Lastadholmen where the fjord empties into the Skagerrak.

== See also ==
- List of Norwegian fjords
