= Heddeland =

Village in Lindesnes Municipality, Norway

- Village
- Interactive map of Heddeland
- Coordinates: 58.19344°N 7.52431°E
- Country: Norway
- Region: Southern Norway
- County: Agder
- Municipality: Lindesnes Municipality
- Elevation: 32 m (105 ft)
- Time zone: UTC+01:00 (CET)
  - Summer (DST): UTC+02:00 (CEST)
- Post Code: 4534 Marnardal

Heddeland is a village in Lindesnes Municipality in Agder county, Norway. The village is located about 4 kilometres (2.5 mi) northeast of the village of Øyslebø along the river Mandalselva. The Sørlandet Line runs through Heddeland and the Marnardal Station is located about 1.5 kilometres (0.93 mi) north of the village.

Historically, the village was the administrative centre of the old Marnardal Municipality which existed from 1964 until its dissolution in 2020.
