= Breland, Norway =

Village in Lindesnes Municipality, Norway

Breland Bredland
- Village
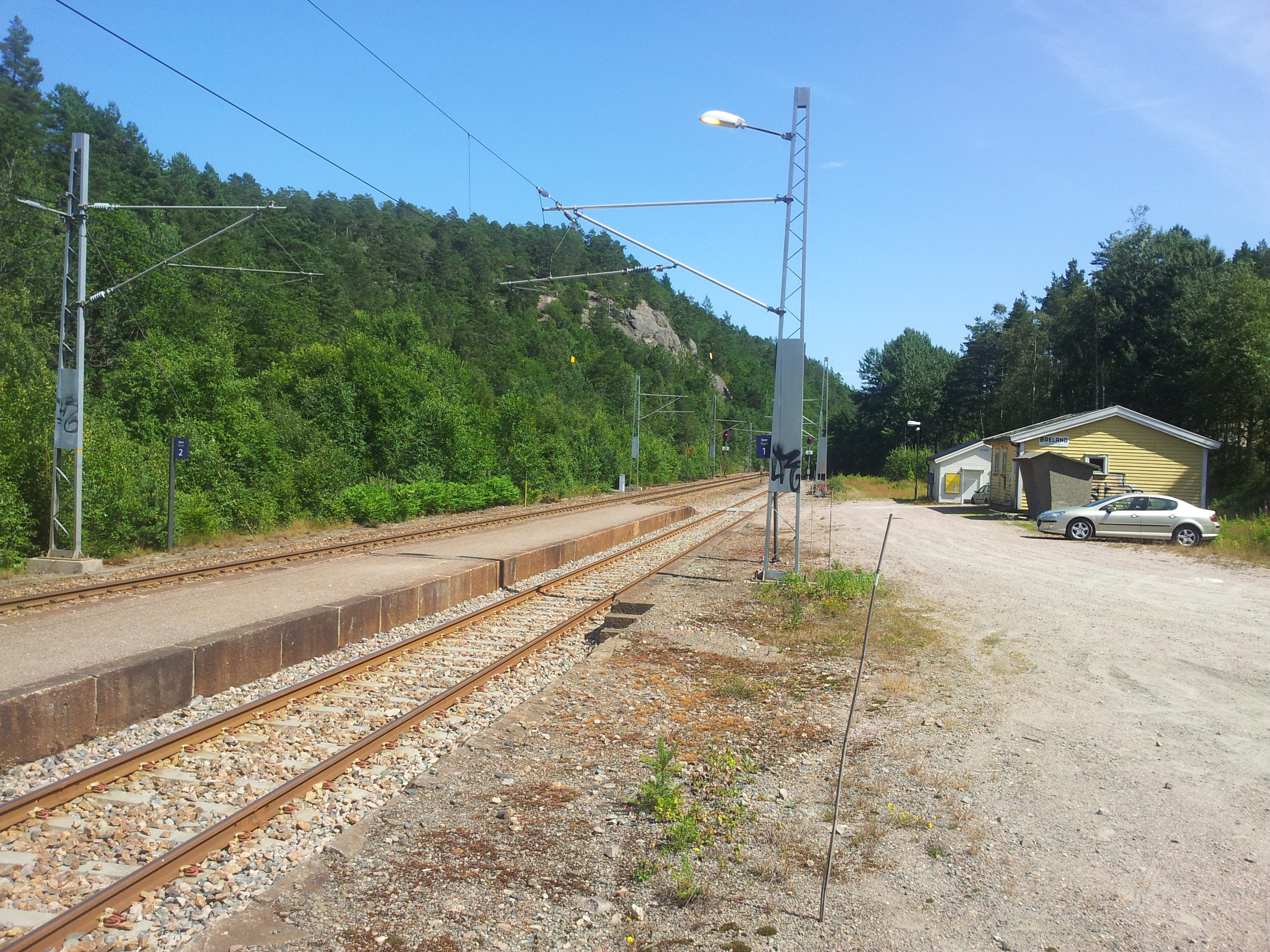
- View of the village railway station
- Interactive map of Breland
- Coordinates: 58.20189°N 7.70622°E
- Country: Norway
- Region: Southern Norway
- County: Agder
- Municipality: Lindesnes Municipality
- Elevation: 177 m (581 ft)
- Time zone: UTC+01:00 (CET)
  - Summer (DST): UTC+02:00 (CEST)
- Post Code: 4534 Marnardal

Breland is a village in Lindesnes Municipality in Agder county, Norway. The village is located just over the border from the neighboring Kristiansand Municipality. The village of Øyslebø lies about 10 kilometres (6.2 mi) to the southwest of Breland. There are about 70 people living in the rural village and surrounding area. The village is served by Breland Station on the Sørlandet Line. The lake Brelandsvannet is located on the east side of the village.
