= Harkmark =

Village in Lindesnes Municipality, Norway

- Village
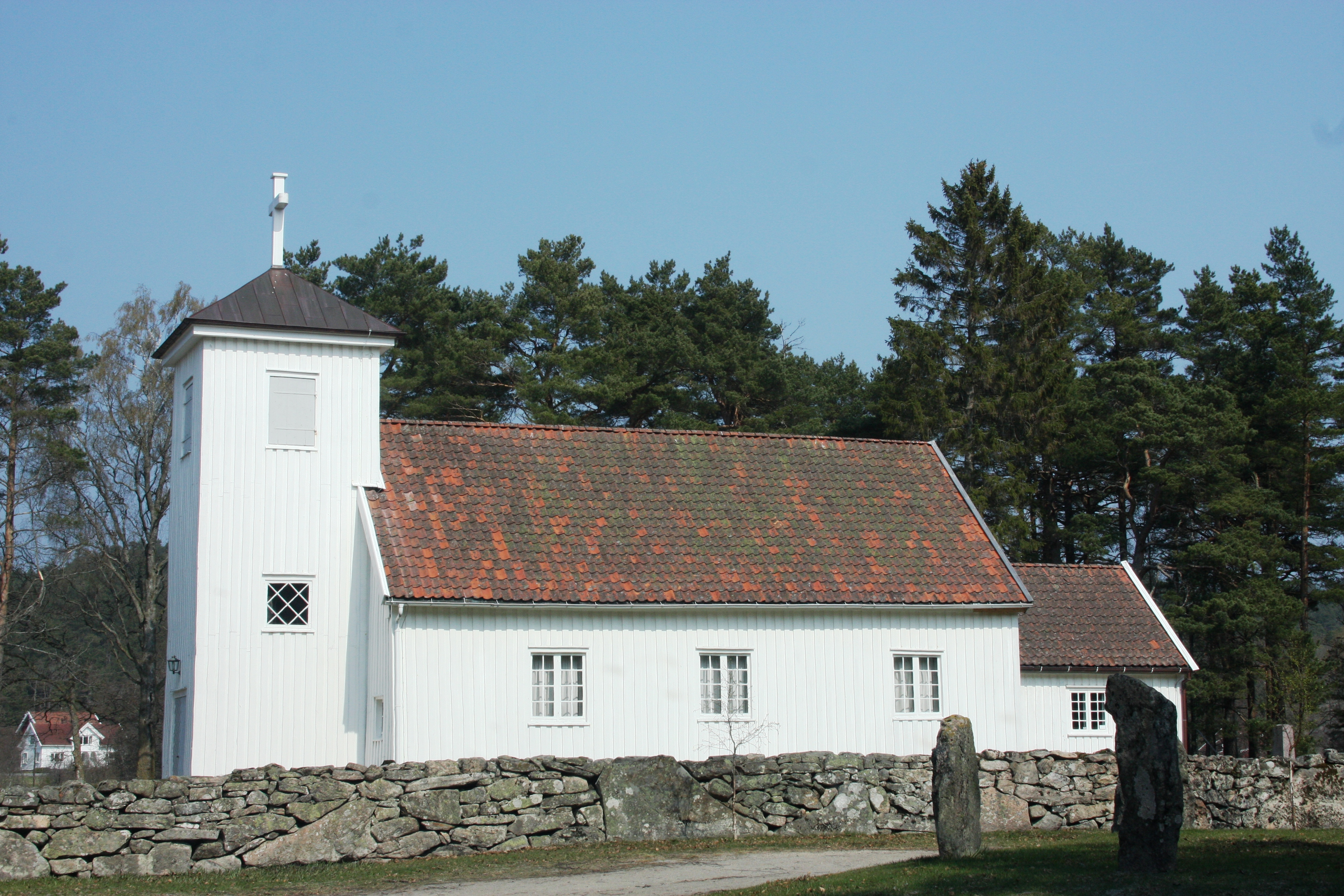
- View of the village church
- Interactive map of Harkmark
- Coordinates: 58.04554°N 7.60458°E
- Country: Norway
- Region: Southern Norway
- County: Agder
- Municipality: Lindesnes Municipality
- Elevation: 4 m (13 ft)
- Time zone: UTC+01:00 (CET)
  - Summer (DST): UTC+02:00 (CEST)
- Post Code: 4516 Mandal

Harkmark is a village in Lindesnes Municipality in Agder county, Norway. The village is located at the northeastern end of the Harkmarkfjorden, about 10 kilometres (6.2 mi) east of the town of Mandal. The village is the site of the Harkmark Church which is where the Harkmark parish is based, and the namesake of the old Halse og Harkmark Municipality which existed from 1838 until 1964.
