= Laudal =

Village in Lindesnes Municipality, Norway

Laudal Nedre Laudal
- Village
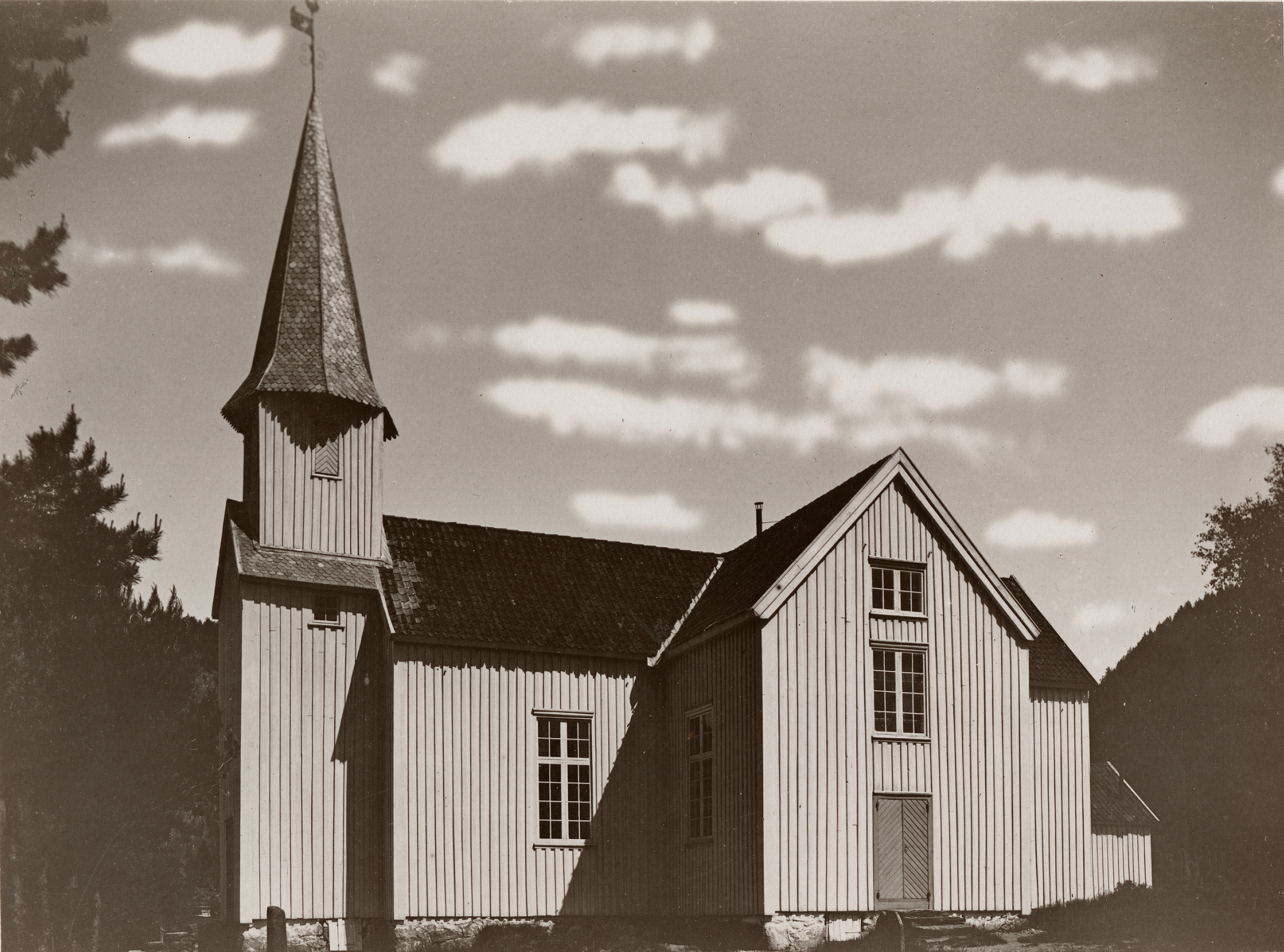
- View of the village church (c. 1900)
- Interactive map of Laudal
- Coordinates: 58.24913°N 7.50246°E
- Country: Norway
- Region: Southern Norway
- County: Agder
- Municipality: Lindesnes Municipality
- Elevation: 38 m (125 ft)
- Time zone: UTC+01:00 (CET)
  - Summer (DST): UTC+02:00 (CEST)
- Post Code: 4534 Marnardal

Laudal is a village in Lindesnes Municipality in Agder county, Norway. The village is located on the western shore of the Mandalselva river, about 15 kilometres (9.3 mi) south of the village of Bjelland and about 9 kilometres (5.6 mi) north of the village of Øyslebø. The village of Laudal has 191 residents (2001). Laudal Church is located in the small village.

== History ==
Laudal was the administrative centre of the old Laudal Municipality which existed from 1899 until its dissolution in 1964.

=== Name ===
The municipality (originally the parish) is named after the old Laudal farm (Old Norse: Laugardalr), since that is the location of the church. The first element of the name of the farm comes from the old name for the river, Laug, (now the Lågåna river) and the last element (Old Norse: dalr) means "valley". Therefore, the name means "Laug river valley".
