= Koland =

Village in Lindesnes Municipality, Norway

- Village
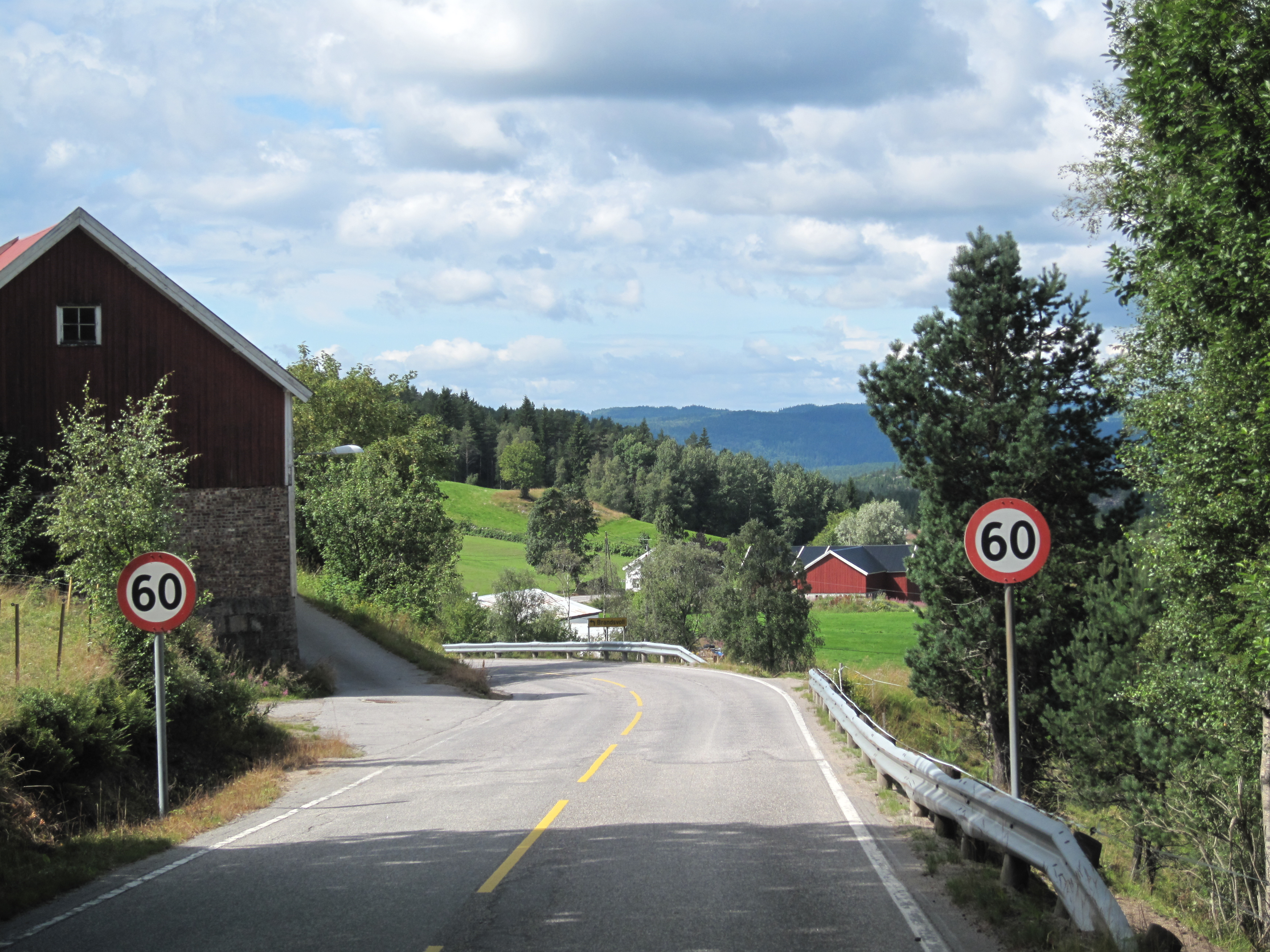
- View of the village of Koland. Photo by Erik Koland.
- Interactive map of Koland
- Coordinates: 58.3837°N 7.60242°E
- Country: Norway
- Region: Southern Norway
- County: Agder
- Municipality: Lindesnes Municipality
- Elevation: 336 m (1,102 ft)
- Time zone: UTC+01:00 (CET)
  - Summer (DST): UTC+02:00 (CEST)
- Post Code: 4536 Bjelland

Koland is a village in Lindesnes Municipality in Agder county, Norway. The village is located between the villages of Bjelland and Hægeland on County Road 462, at the intersection of County Road 101.
