= Leif Edwardsen =

Norwegian diplomat

Leif Edward Edwardsen (20 December 1922 – 13 August 2002) was a Norwegian diplomat.

He was born in Mandal, and finished his secondary education in 1942. During the Second World War he studied before the university was closed; he then worked as a journalist in Morgenbladet among other things. After the war he studied at Columbia University, whence he graduated with a Master of Arts degree in 1948. He started working for the Norwegian Ministry of Foreign Affairs in 1949. He served as a vice consul in Antwerp, embassy secretary in Belgium and Egypt and charge d'affairs in Lebanon. In 1962 he became an assistant secretary in the Ministry of Foreign Affairs. In 1967 he became an embassy counsellor in Belgium. He was the Norwegian ambassador to the Council of Europe from 1970 to 1973, to Portugal from 1976 to 1983, to Côte d'Ivoire from 1983 to 1987 and to Hungary from 1987 to 1990. After that he worked part-time in Sandefjords Blad, and lived in Sandefjord. He died in August 2002.
