= Magne Haraldstad =

Norwegian politician

Magne Haraldstad (25 July 1937 – 11 April 2008) was a Norwegian politician for the Centre Party.

He served as a deputy representative to the Parliament of Norway from Vest-Agder during the term 1973–1977. In total he met during 12 days of parliamentary session.
