= Laudal Church =

Church in Agder, Norway

- Laudal kyrkje
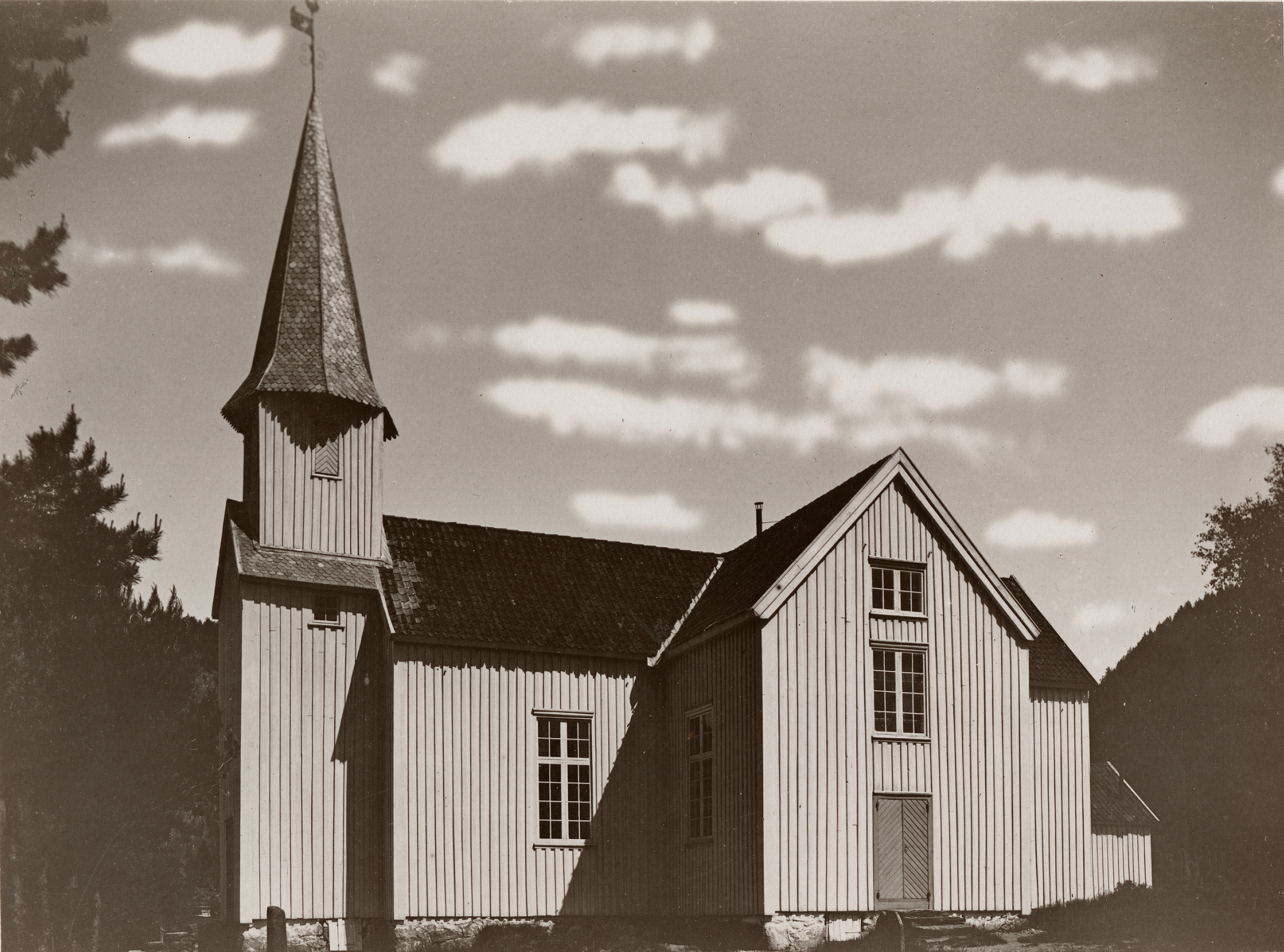
- View of the church
- Laudal Church
- 58.24697°N 07.50453°E
- Location: Lindesnes Municipality, Agder
- Country: Norway
- Denomination: Church of Norway
- Previous denomination: Catholic Church
- Churchmanship: Evangelical Lutheran

History
- Status: Parish church
- Founded: 14th century
- Consecrated: 1826

Architecture
- Functional status: Active
- Architect: Leg Askildsen Hallingskaar
- Architectural type: Cruciform
- Completed: 1826 (200 years ago)

Specifications
- Capacity: 300
- Materials: Wood

Administration
- Diocese: Agder og Telemark
- Deanery: Lister og Mandal prosti
- Parish: Marnardal
- Norwegian Cultural Heritage Site
- Type: Church
- Status: Automatically protected
- ID: 84912

Laudal Church (Norwegian: Laudal kyrkje) is a parish church of the Church of Norway in Lindesnes Municipality in Agder county, Norway. It is located in the village of Laudal. It is one of the churches for the Marnardal parish which is part of the Lister og Mandal prosti (deanery) in the Diocese of Agder og Telemark. The white, wooden church was built in a cruciform design in 1826 using plans drawn up by the architect Leg Askildsen Hallingskaar. The church seats about 300 people.

== History ==
The earliest existing historical records of the church date back to the year 1428, but the church was not new that year. In 1501, a church building on this site was consecrated, but it is not known if it was a newly built church or a renovation of an existing building. In 1777, the nave of the church was torn down and rebuilt, but the chancel was unchanged. In 1826, the entire church was torn down and a new building was constructed on the same site. Some of the old foundation wall was reused in the new construction.

== See also ==
- List of churches in Agder og Telemark
