= Lindesnes Municipality =

Municipality in Agder, Norway

Lindesnes Municipality Lindesnes kommune
- Municipality
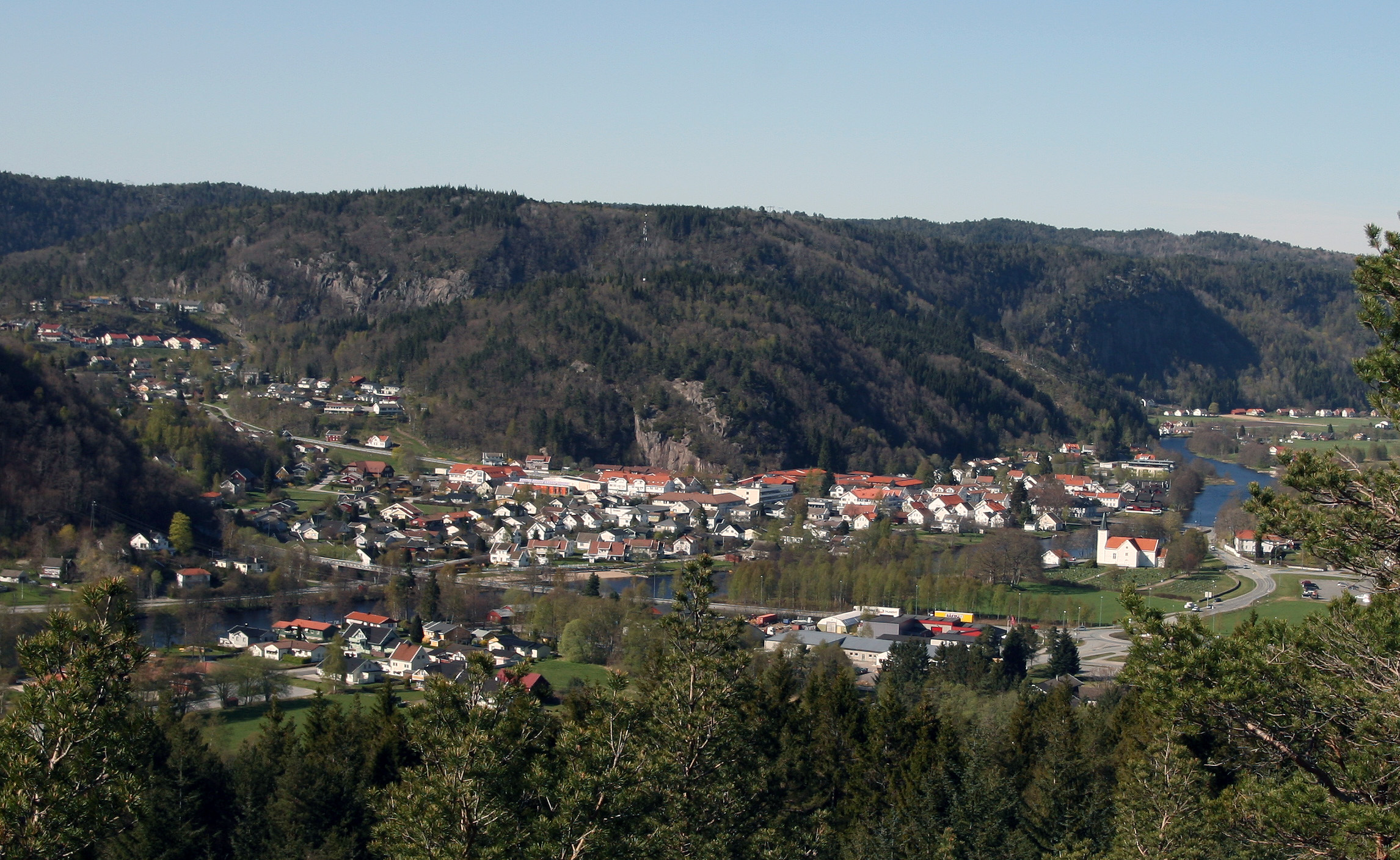
- View of the village of Vigeland

- Coat of arms

- Agder within Norway

- Lindesnes within Agder
- Coordinates: 58°06′15″N 07°17′20″E
- Country: Norway
- County: Agder
- District: Sørlandet
- Established: 1 Jan 1964
  - Preceded by: Spangereid; Sør-Audnedal; Vigmostad
- Administrative centre: Mandal

Government
  - Mayor (2023): Alf Erik Andersen (FrP)

Area
  - Total: 933.56 km^{2} (360.45 sq mi)
  - Land: 883.48 km^{2} (341.11 sq mi)
  - Water: 50.08 km^{2} (19.34 sq mi) 5.4%
  - Rank: #126 in Norway
- Highest elevation: 511.78 m (1,679.1 ft)

Population (2026)
  - Total: 23,702
  - Rank: #55 in Norway
  - Density: 26.8/km^{2} (69/sq mi)
  - Change (10 years): ▲ +4.1%
- Demonym(s): Lindesnes-folk; Lindesnesmann (male); Lindesneskvinne (female)

Official language
  - Norwegian form: Bokmål
- Time zone: UTC+01:00 (CET)
  - Summer (DST): UTC+02:00 (CEST)
- ISO 3166 code: NO-4205
- Website: Official website

Lindesnes is a municipality in Agder county, Norway. It is located in the traditional district of Sørlandet. The administrative centre of the municipality is the town of Mandal. Other villages in Lindesnes Municipality include Aukland, Bjelland, Breland, Bykjernen, Harkmark, Heddeland, Høllen, Koland, Krossen, Laudal, Skjebstad, Skinsnes-Ime, Skofteland, Skogsfjord-Hesland, Svennevik, Sånum-Lundevik, Tregde-Skjernøy, Vigeland, Vigmostad, Åvik, and Øyslebø.

The 933.56-square-kilometre (360.45 sq mi) municipality is the 126th largest by area out of the 357 municipalities in Norway. Lindesnes Municipality is the 55th most populous municipality in Norway with a population of 23,702. The municipality's population density is 26.8 inhabitants per square kilometre (69/sq mi) and its population has increased by 4.1% over the previous 10-year period.

== General information ==
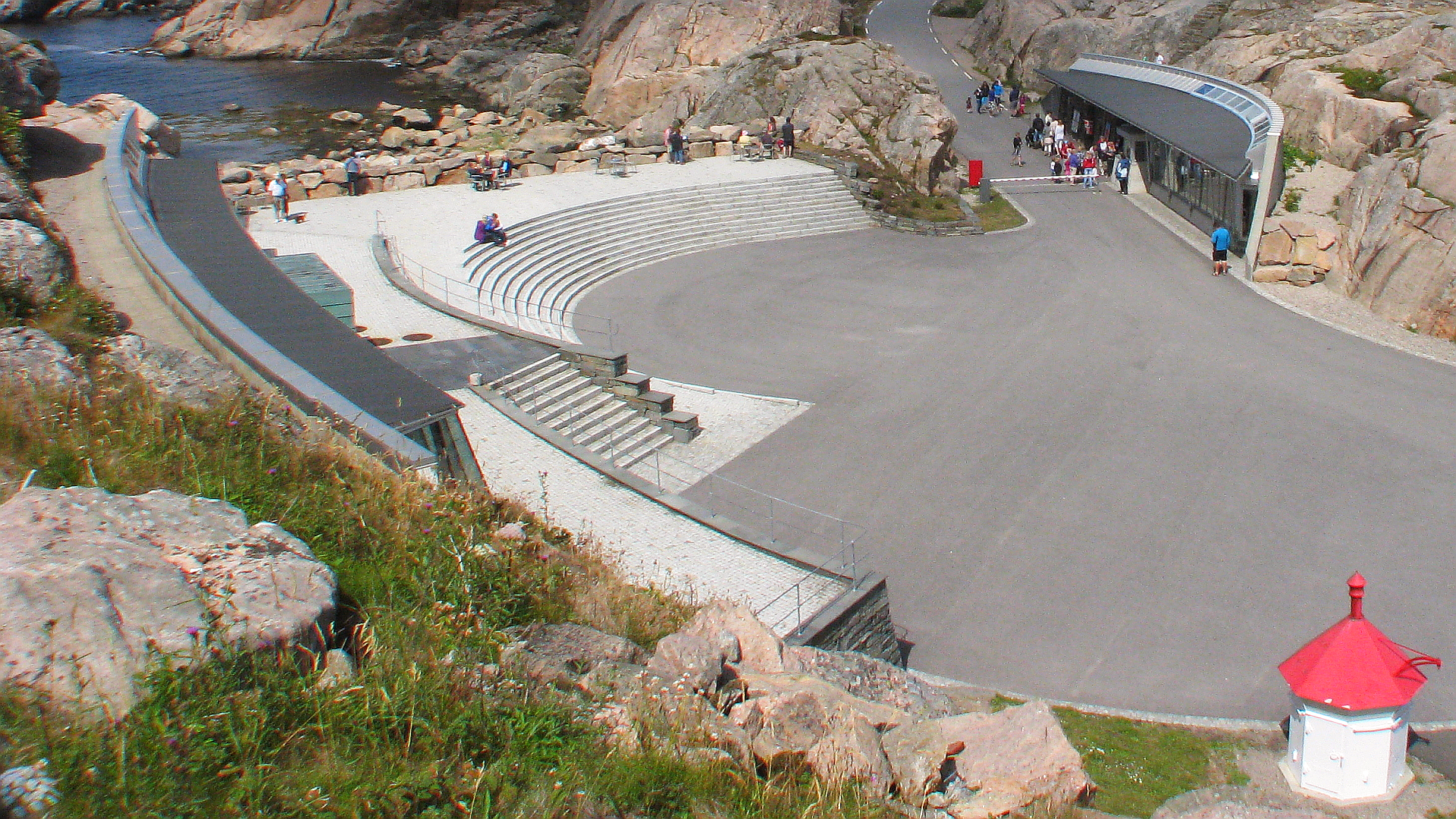
Lindesnes Fjellhallen (Millenium-Fjellhallen built in the rocks 2000–2004)

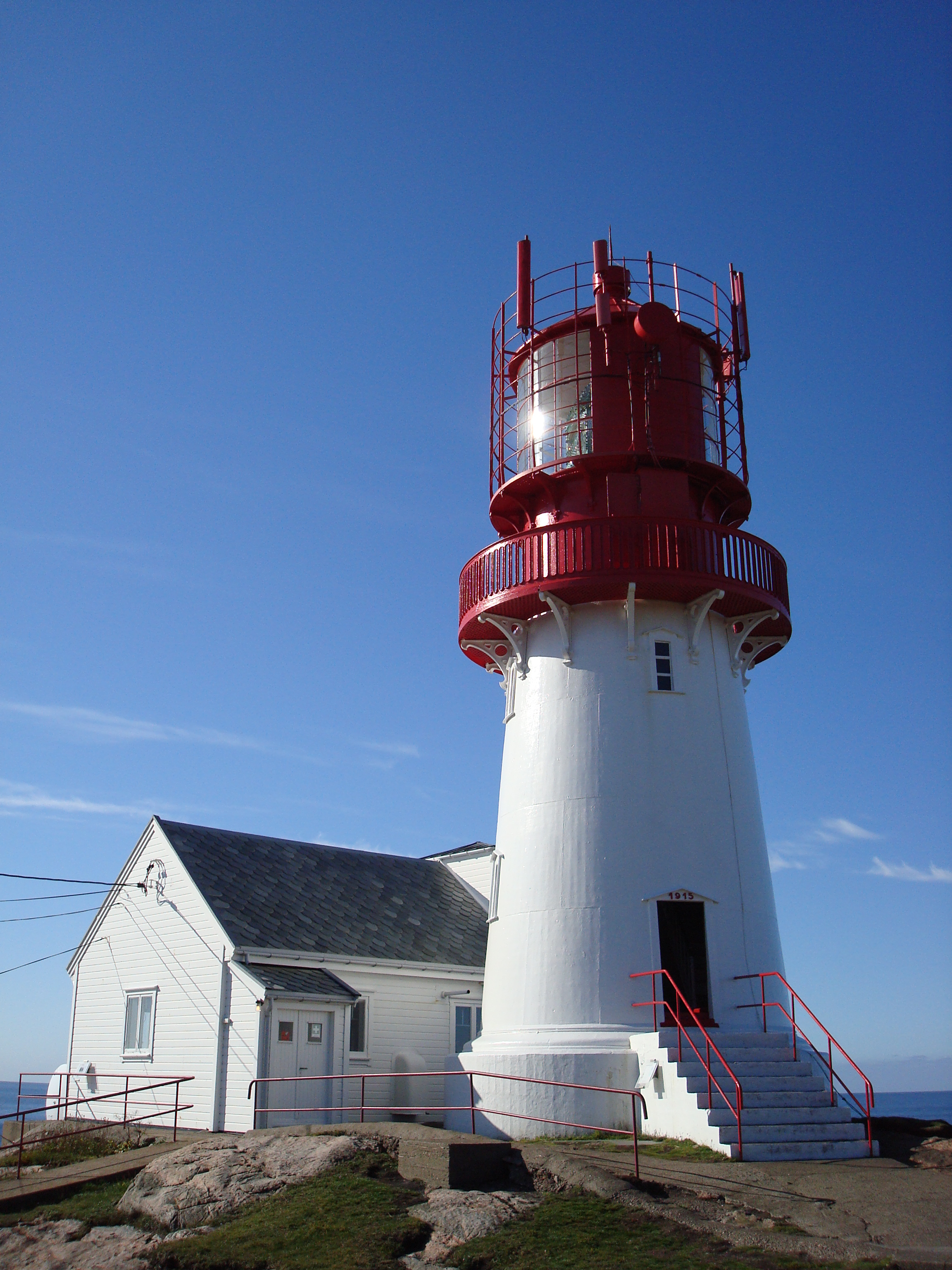
Lindesnes fyr. The lighthouse is close to the southernmost point of mainland Norway.

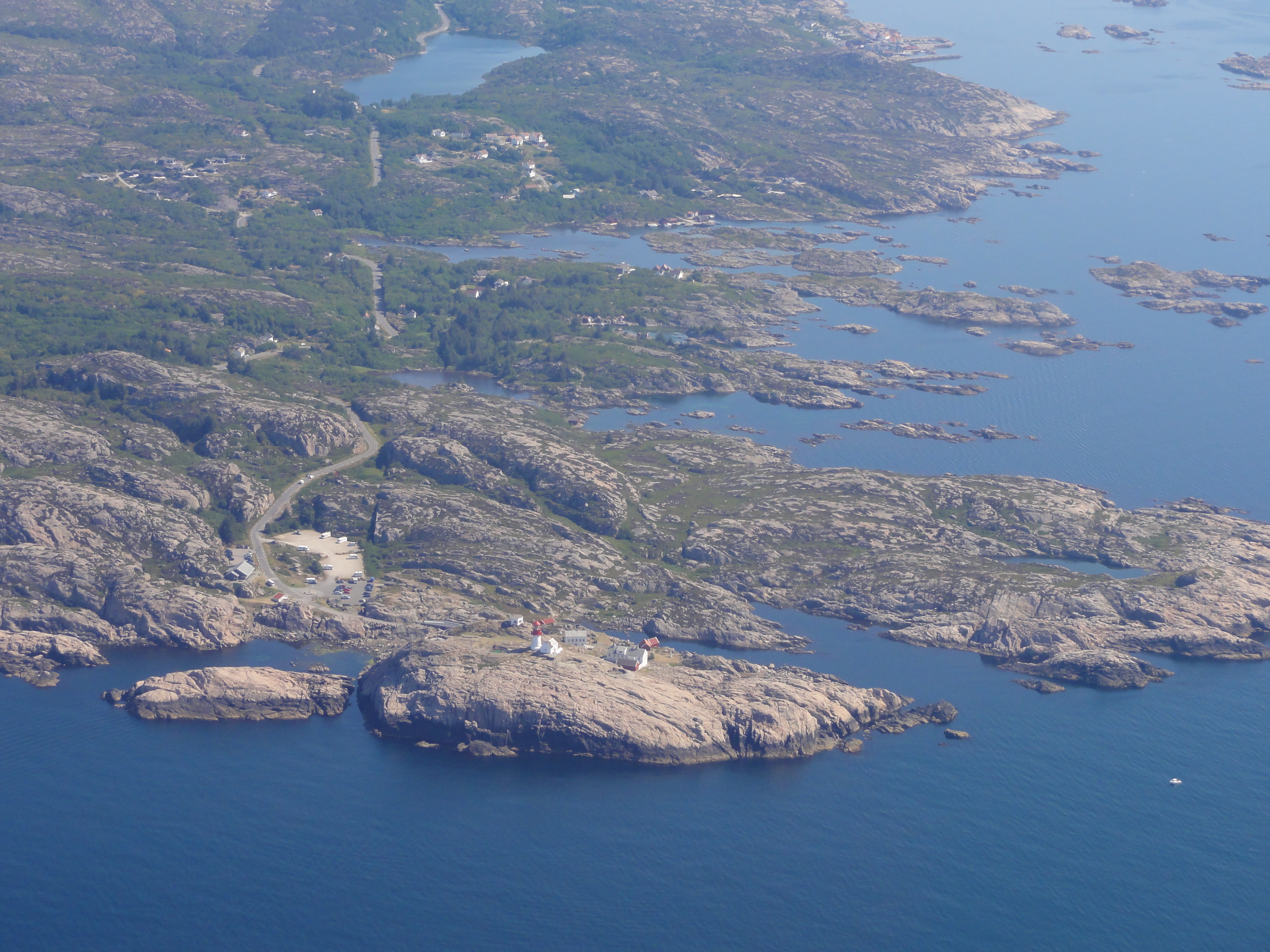
Aerial view of the southern coastline of Lindesnes

During the 1960s, there were many municipal mergers across Norway due to the work of the Schei Committee. The municipality of Lindesnes was established on 1 January 1964 upon the merger of the following neighboring municipalities:

- all of Spangereid Municipality (population: 899)
- all of Sør-Audnedal Municipality (population: 2,323)
- all of Vigmostad Municipality (population: 589)

In 2020, there were many municipal and county mergers across Norway due to the work of the Solberg cabinet. Historically, this municipality was part of the old Vest-Agder county. On 1 January 2020, the municipality became a part of the newly-formed Agder county (after Aust-Agder and Vest-Agder counties were merged). Also on 1 January 2020, the following areas were merged to form an enlarged Lindesnes Municipality. At the same time, the administrative centre of the enlarged municipality was moved to the town of Mandal.

- all of Lindesnes Municipality (population: 4,953)
- all of Mandal Municipality (population: 15,659)
- all of Marnardal Municipality (population: 2,297)

=== Name ===
The oldest Old Norse form of the name was Líðandi. That name is derived from the verb líða which means "lead to an end" or "go to the end" and the meaning of this name is probably just "the end", referring to its location at the southern tip of Norway. A later form was Líðandisnes where the word nes which means "headland" was added (a word that is related to the English forms ness and naze). The traditional English language version of the name is just the Naze, derived from ness meaning headland.

=== Coat of arms ===
The original coat of arms was granted on 25 April 1986 and it was in use until 1 January 2020 when the municipality was enlarged and a new coat of arms was adopted. The official blazon was "Azure a lighthouse issuant argent" (Norwegian: I blått et oppvoksende sølv fyrtårn). This means the arms have a blue field (background) and the charge is the top of a lighthouse. The lighthouse has a tincture of argent which means it is commonly colored white, but if it is made out of metal, then silver is used. The lighthouse represents the local Lindesnes Lighthouse, the oldest lighthouse in Norway. It was built in 1655 on the Lindesnes peninsula. The arms were designed by Truls Nygaard who based it after a design by Rolf Dybvig. The municipal flag had the same design as the coat of arms.

The new coat of arms was granted on 1 January 2020 and it was a slightly more modern take on the old arms. The blazon is "Azure, a lighthouse issuant and a crest a mural crown argent" (Norwegian: På blågrønn bakgrunn, et hvitt fyrtårn med murkrone). This means the arms have a blue field (background) and the charge is a lighthouse with a crown above the shield. The charge has a tincture of argent which means it is commonly colored white, but if it is made out of metal, then silver is used. The new arms have a slightly different design and the addition of a mural crown above the escutcheon to represent the fact that the municipality now includes the town of Mandal. The color was also changed to a more teal blue.

Coats of arms of Lindesnes

Current coat of arms
(1 Jan 2020–present)

Former coat of arms
(24 Apr 1986–31 Dec 2019)

=== Churches ===
The Church of Norway has eight parishes (sokn) within Lindesnes Municipality. It is part of the Lister og Mandal prosti (deanery) in the Diocese of Agder og Telemark.

Churches in Lindesnes Municipality
Parish (sokn)	Church name	Location of the church	Year built
Bjelland	Bjelland Church	Bjelland	1793
Holum	Holum Church	Krossen	1825
Laudal	Laudal Church	Laudal	1826
Mandal	Harkmark Church	Harkmark	1613
Mandal	Mandal Church	Mandal	1821
Spangereid	Spangereid Church	Høllen	c. 1140
Valle	Valle Church	Vigeland	1793
Vigmostad	Vigmostad Church	Vigmostad	1848
Øyslebø	Øyslebø Church	Øyslebø	1797

== Government ==
Lindesnes Municipality is responsible for primary education (through 10th grade), outpatient health services, senior citizen services, welfare and other social services, zoning, economic development, and municipal roads and utilities. The municipality is governed by a municipal council of directly elected representatives. The mayor is indirectly elected by a vote of the municipal council. The municipality is under the jurisdiction of the Agder District Court and the Agder Court of Appeal.

=== Municipal council ===
The municipal council (Kommunestyre) of Lindesnes Municipality is made up of 39 representatives that are elected to four year terms. The tables below show the current and historical composition of the council by political party.

Lindesnes kommunestyre 2023–2027
Party name (in Norwegian)	Number of representatives
Labour Party (Arbeiderpartiet)	5
Progress Party (Fremskrittspartiet)	9
Green Party (Miljøpartiet De Grønne)	1
Conservative Party (Høyre)	6
Industry and Business Party (Industri‑ og Næringspartiet)	2
The Conservatives (Konservativt)	1
Christian Democratic Party (Kristelig Folkeparti)	4
Centre Party (Senterpartiet)	2
Socialist Left Party (Sosialistisk Venstreparti)	3
Liberal Party (Venstre)	6
Total number of members:	39

Lindesnes kommunestyre 2019–2023
Party name (in Norwegian)	Number of representatives
Labour Party (Arbeiderpartiet)	8
Progress Party (Fremskrittspartiet)	11
Green Party (Miljøpartiet De Grønne)	2
Conservative Party (Høyre)	6
Christian Democratic Party (Kristelig Folkeparti)	4
Centre Party (Senterpartiet)	5
Socialist Left Party (Sosialistisk Venstreparti)	1
Liberal Party (Venstre)	2
Total number of members:	39
Note: On 1 January 2020, Lindesnes Municipality, Mandal Municipality, and Marnardal Municipality were merged to form an enlarged Lindesnes Municipality.

Lindesnes kommunestyre 2015–2019
Party name (in Norwegian)	Number of representatives
Labour Party (Arbeiderpartiet)	3
Progress Party (Fremskrittspartiet)	2
Conservative Party (Høyre)	7
Christian Democratic Party (Kristelig Folkeparti)	5
Pensioners' Party (Pensjonistpartiet)	1
Centre Party (Senterpartiet)	1
Liberal Party (Venstre)	2
Total number of members:	21

Lindesnes kommunestyre 2011–2015
Party name (in Norwegian)	Number of representatives
Labour Party (Arbeiderpartiet)	2
Progress Party (Fremskrittspartiet)	2
Conservative Party (Høyre)	5
Christian Democratic Party (Kristelig Folkeparti)	5
Pensioners' Party (Pensjonistpartiet)	2
Centre Party (Senterpartiet)	1
Liberal Party (Venstre)	4
Total number of members:	21

Lindesnes kommunestyre 2007–2011
Party name (in Norwegian)	Number of representatives
Labour Party (Arbeiderpartiet)	2
Progress Party (Fremskrittspartiet)	4
Conservative Party (Høyre)	3
Christian Democratic Party (Kristelig Folkeparti)	8
Centre Party (Senterpartiet)	2
Liberal Party (Venstre)	2
Total number of members:	21

Lindesnes kommunestyre 2003–2007
Party name (in Norwegian)	Number of representatives
Labour Party (Arbeiderpartiet)	4
Progress Party (Fremskrittspartiet)	3
Conservative Party (Høyre)	3
Christian Democratic Party (Kristelig Folkeparti)	6
Centre Party (Senterpartiet)	2
Socialist Left Party (Sosialistisk Venstreparti)	1
Liberal Party (Venstre)	2
Total number of members:	21

Lindesnes kommunestyre 1999–2003
Party name (in Norwegian)	Number of representatives
Labour Party (Arbeiderpartiet)	4
Progress Party (Fremskrittspartiet)	3
Conservative Party (Høyre)	5
Christian Democratic Party (Kristelig Folkeparti)	8
Centre Party (Senterpartiet)	2
Liberal Party (Venstre)	3
Total number of members:	25

Lindesnes kommunestyre 1995–1999
Party name (in Norwegian)	Number of representatives
Labour Party (Arbeiderpartiet)	5
Conservative Party (Høyre)	6
Christian Democratic Party (Kristelig Folkeparti)	6
Centre Party (Senterpartiet)	4
Liberal Party (Venstre)	4
Total number of members:	25

Lindesnes kommunestyre 1991–1995
Party name (in Norwegian)	Number of representatives
Labour Party (Arbeiderpartiet)	5
Conservative Party (Høyre)	8
Christian Democratic Party (Kristelig Folkeparti)	5
Centre Party (Senterpartiet)	4
Liberal Party (Venstre)	3
Total number of members:	25

Lindesnes kommunestyre 1987–1991
Party name (in Norwegian)	Number of representatives
Labour Party (Arbeiderpartiet)	7
Conservative Party (Høyre)	8
Christian Democratic Party (Kristelig Folkeparti)	5
Centre Party (Senterpartiet)	3
Liberal Party (Venstre)	2
Total number of members:	25

Lindesnes kommunestyre 1983–1987
Party name (in Norwegian)	Number of representatives
Labour Party (Arbeiderpartiet)	7
Conservative Party (Høyre)	8
Christian Democratic Party (Kristelig Folkeparti)	6
Centre Party (Senterpartiet)	2
Liberal Party (Venstre)	2
Total number of members:	25

Lindesnes kommunestyre 1979–1983
Party name (in Norwegian)	Number of representatives
Labour Party (Arbeiderpartiet)	5
Conservative Party (Høyre)	10
Christian Democratic Party (Kristelig Folkeparti)	5
Centre Party (Senterpartiet)	3
Liberal Party (Venstre)	2
Total number of members:	25

Lindesnes kommunestyre 1975–1979
Party name (in Norwegian)	Number of representatives
Labour Party (Arbeiderpartiet)	5
Conservative Party (Høyre)	7
Christian Democratic Party (Kristelig Folkeparti)	5
New People's Party (Nye Folkepartiet)	1
Centre Party (Senterpartiet)	4
Liberal Party (Venstre)	2
Cross-party list (Tverrpolitisk Liste)	1
Total number of members:	25

Lindesnes kommunestyre 1971–1975
Party name (in Norwegian)	Number of representatives
Labour Party (Arbeiderpartiet)	7
Conservative Party (Høyre)	2
Christian Democratic Party (Kristelig Folkeparti)	4
Centre Party (Senterpartiet)	5
Liberal Party (Venstre)	7
Total number of members:	25

Lindesnes kommunestyre 1967–1971
Party name (in Norwegian)	Number of representatives
Labour Party (Arbeiderpartiet)	7
Conservative Party (Høyre)	3
Christian Democratic Party (Kristelig Folkeparti)	3
Centre Party (Senterpartiet)	5
Liberal Party (Venstre)	7
Total number of members:	25

Lindesnes kommunestyre 1963–1967
Party name (in Norwegian)	Number of representatives
Labour Party (Arbeiderpartiet)	7
Conservative Party (Høyre)	3
Christian Democratic Party (Kristelig Folkeparti)	2
Centre Party (Senterpartiet)	5
Liberal Party (Venstre)	8
Total number of members:	25

=== Mayors ===
The mayor (Norwegian: ordfører) of Lindesnes Municipality is the political leader of the municipality and the chairperson of the municipal council. The following people have held this position:

- 1964–1967: Gunnar Gulli (V)
- 1968–1971: Daniel Leland (Sp)
- 1972–1975: Knut Lunden (KrF)
- 1976–1979: Terje Gabrielsen (H)
- 1980–1981: Kenneth Skofteland (KrF)
- 1982–1983: Peder Skofteland (H)
- 1984–1987: Kenneth Skofteland (KrF)
- 1988–1993: Ansgar Gabrielsen (H)
- 1993–1999: Oddleiv Skagestad (H)
- 1999–2011: Ivar Lindal (KrF)
- 2011–2019: Janne Fardal Kristoffersen (H)
- 2019–2023: Even Sagebakken (Ap)
- 2023–present: Alf Erik Andersen (FrP)

== Geography ==
Lindesnes is a coastal municipality, with a long stretch of coastline to the south. It borders Lyngdal Municipality to the west, Evje og Hornnes Municipality to the north, both Kristiansand Municipality and Vennesla Municipality to the east, and the Skagerrak strait is to the south. The Lindesnes Lighthouse stands on the southernmost point of the mainland of Norway on the Lindesnes peninsula, nearly 1,700 kilometres (1,100 mi) southwest of Knivskjellodden, the northernmost point of mainland Norway.

The southern coast of Lindesnes Municipality is rugged and includes several fjords such as the Snigsfjorden and Grønsfjorden as well as many islands such as Svinør. The western part of the municipality follows the lower Audnedalen valley through which the river Audna flows south into the Snigsfjorden and the eastern part of the municipality follows the whole Mandalen valley which follows the river Mandalselva to the sea. The highest point in the municipality is the 511.78-metre (1,679.1 ft) tall mountain Ørteknappknuten.

=== Climate ===
Lindesnes Municipality has a temperate oceanic climate (Cfb). The weather station has been recording since January 1863, and is situated near the Lindesnes lighthouse on a peninsula protruding into the sea. It is the southernmost mainland point in Norway. The all-time high temperature is 27.3 °C (81.1 °F) recorded August 1975; the all-time low is −18.1 °C (−0.6 °F) recorded in January 1987. The five months May - September have not seen any overnight freeze, with coldest low 0.6 °C (33.1 °F) in May 1981 (data since 1954).

Climate data for Lindesnes Lighthouse 1991-2020 (extremes 1954-2020)
Month	Jan	Feb	Mar	Apr	May	Jun	Jul	Aug	Sep	Oct	Nov	Dec	Year
Record high °C (°F)	10.2 (50.4)	9.5 (49.1)	14.9 (58.8)	18 (64)	23.2 (73.8)	26.4 (79.5)	27 (81)	27.3 (81.1)	21.3 (70.3)	16.6 (61.9)	13.7 (56.7)	11.4 (52.5)	27.3 (81.1)
Mean daily maximum °C (°F)	4.5 (40.1)	3.7 (38.7)	5 (41)	8.2 (46.8)	12.1 (53.8)	15.1 (59.2)	17.7 (63.9)	18.2 (64.8)	15.4 (59.7)	11.4 (52.5)	7.9 (46.2)	5.7 (42.3)	10.4 (50.8)
Daily mean °C (°F)	2.9 (37.2)	2 (36)	3.2 (37.8)	6.1 (43.0)	9.9 (49.8)	13 (55)	15.6 (60.1)	16.2 (61.2)	13.6 (56.5)	9.8 (49.6)	6.3 (43.3)	4 (39)	8.5 (47.4)
Mean daily minimum °C (°F)	1.2 (34.2)	0.5 (32.9)	1.6 (34.9)	4.4 (39.9)	8.1 (46.6)	11.2 (52.2)	13.9 (57.0)	14.4 (57.9)	11.9 (53.4)	8.1 (46.6)	4.7 (40.5)	2.3 (36.1)	6.9 (44.3)
Record low °C (°F)	−18.1 (−0.6)	−15.1 (4.8)	−11 (12)	−5.5 (22.1)	0.6 (33.1)	4.5 (40.1)	6 (43)	7.8 (46.0)	3.6 (38.5)	−1.6 (29.1)	−8.3 (17.1)	−16.5 (2.3)	−18.1 (−0.6)
Average precipitation mm (inches)	131.2 (5.17)	99.7 (3.93)	87.5 (3.44)	69 (2.7)	63.5 (2.50)	71.9 (2.83)	81.8 (3.22)	101.3 (3.99)	119.1 (4.69)	151.6 (5.97)	132.4 (5.21)	135.2 (5.32)	1,244.2 (48.97)
Average precipitation days	17	13	13	10	10	9	10	12	14	16	16	17	157
Source 1: yr.no/Norwegian Meteorological Institute
Source 2: NOAA - WMO averages 91-2020 Norway

Climate data for Lindesnes Lighthouse 1961-1990
Month	Jan	Feb	Mar	Apr	May	Jun	Jul	Aug	Sep	Oct	Nov	Dec	Year
Mean daily maximum °C (°F)	2.7 (36.9)	2.3 (36.1)	3.7 (38.7)	6.9 (44.4)	11.3 (52.3)	14.9 (58.8)	16.3 (61.3)	16.8 (62.2)	14.2 (57.6)	11.1 (52.0)	7.4 (45.3)	4.7 (40.5)	9.4 (48.9)
Daily mean °C (°F)	1.1 (34.0)	0.5 (32.9)	2.0 (35.6)	4.7 (40.5)	9.0 (48.2)	12.5 (54.5)	14.2 (57.6)	14.8 (58.6)	12.4 (54.3)	9.6 (49.3)	5.6 (42.1)	2.9 (37.2)	7.4 (45.3)
Mean daily minimum °C (°F)	−0.7 (30.7)	−1.3 (29.7)	0.3 (32.5)	2.8 (37.0)	7.3 (45.1)	10.7 (51.3)	12.4 (54.3)	13.0 (55.4)	10.7 (51.3)	7.9 (46.2)	3.8 (38.8)	0.9 (33.6)	5.7 (42.3)
Average precipitation mm (inches)	109 (4.3)	72 (2.8)	83 (3.3)	60 (2.4)	71 (2.8)	65 (2.6)	78 (3.1)	102 (4.0)	125 (4.9)	143 (5.6)	146 (5.7)	105 (4.1)	1,159 (45.6)
Average precipitation days (≥ 1 mm)	14.7	10.2	12.9	9.5	9.5	8.9	8.8	11.4	14.3	15.5	17.4	14.4	147.5
Source: Norwegian Meteorological Institute

== Notable people ==
=== Public service & public thinking ===
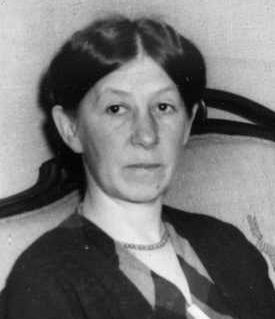
Ellen Gleditsch, 1935

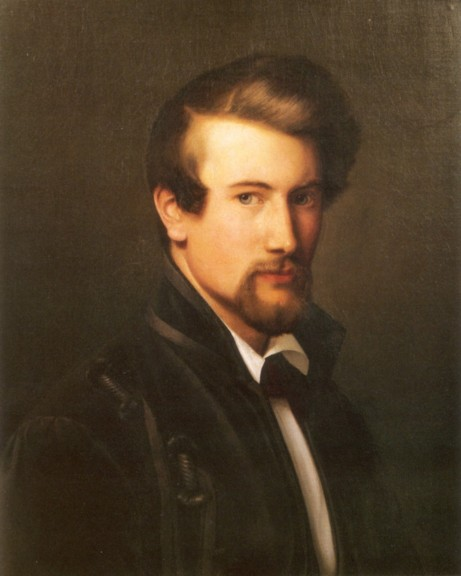
Adolph Tidemand, 1838

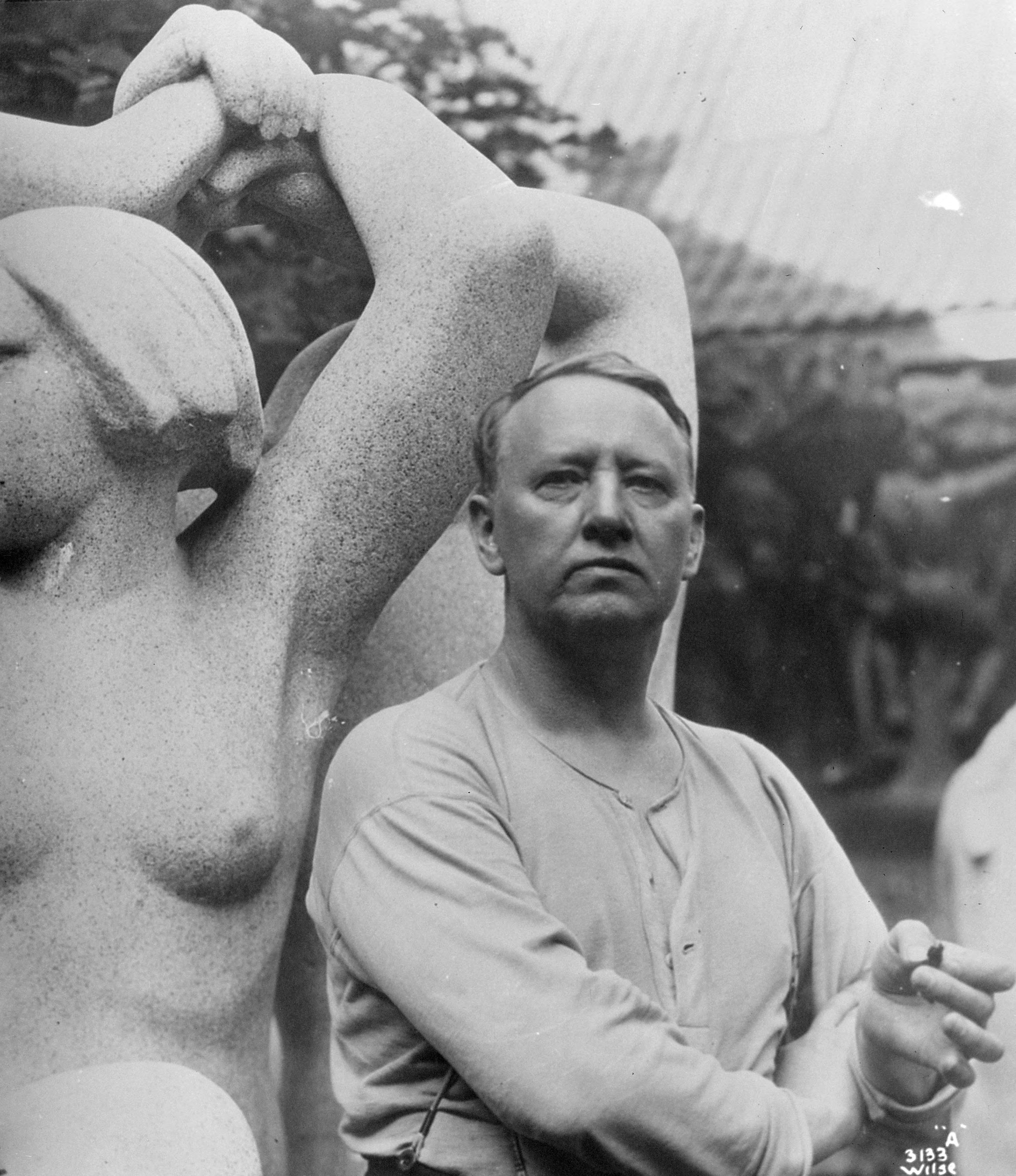
Gustav Vigeland, 1929

- Peder Claussøn Friis (1545–1614), a clergyman and author
- Søren Jaabæk (1814 in Holum – 1894), a farmer and politician who was the longest-serving member of the Norwegian Parliament from 1845 to 1891
- Geirulf Bugge (1862 in Mandal – 1940), a judge and Norwegian Supreme Court Justice
- Ivar An Christensen (1868 in Mandal – 1934), a ship owner with a fleet of eleven steam ships
- Elise Sem (1870–1950), a barrister, women's activist, and sports official who grew up in Manadal
- Ellen Gleditsch (1879 in Mandal – 1968), a radiochemist and Norway's second female professor
- Karen Platou (1879 in Mandal – 1950), a politician who was the first woman elected Member of Parliament
- Arne Askildsen (1898–1982), a politician and bailiff of Mandal and Halse og Harkmark from 1928–1968, except during WWII
- Asbjørn Aavik (1902 in Åvik - 1997), a Church of Norway missionary to China and writer
- Leif Edwardsen (1922 in Mandal - 2002), a Norwegian diplomat
- Knut Aukland (1929 in Vigmostad – 2014), a physiologist
- Ole-Johan Dahl (1931 in Mandal – 2002), Norway's foremost computer scientist
- Ludvig Hope Faye (1931–2017), a politician who was Mayor of Mandal from 1972–1975
- Ansgar Gabrielsen (born 1955 in Mandal), a consultant and former politician
- Janne Haaland Matláry (born 1957), a political scientist, writer, politician, and academic

=== The Arts ===
- Adolph Tidemand (1814 in Mandal – 1876), a romantic nationalism painter
- Olaf Isaachsen (1835 in Madal – 1893), a landscape and genre painter
- Amaldus Nielsen (1838 in Halse – 1932), a painter known as "Norway's first naturalist painter"
- Gustav Vigeland (1869 in Halse og Harkmark - 1943), a sculptor who is associated with the Vigeland Sculptures in Frogner Park in Oslo and designed the Nobel Peace Prize medal
- Emanuel Vigeland (1875 in Halse og Harkmark - 1948), a multi-talented Norwegian artist
- Kjell Askildsen (born 1929 in Mandal), a writer of minimalistic short stories
- Tobias Santelmann (born 1980), a German-born Norwegian actor who grew up in Lindesnes
- Helene Bøksle (born 1981 in Mandal), a singer and actress

=== Sport ===
- Per Arne Nilsen (born 1961 in Mandal), a sailor who participated at the 1984 Summer Olympics
- Bjarne Røyland (born 1971 in Mandal), a bobsledder who competed at the 2002 Winter Olympics
