= Øyslebø Church =

Church in Agder, Norway

- Øyslebø kirke
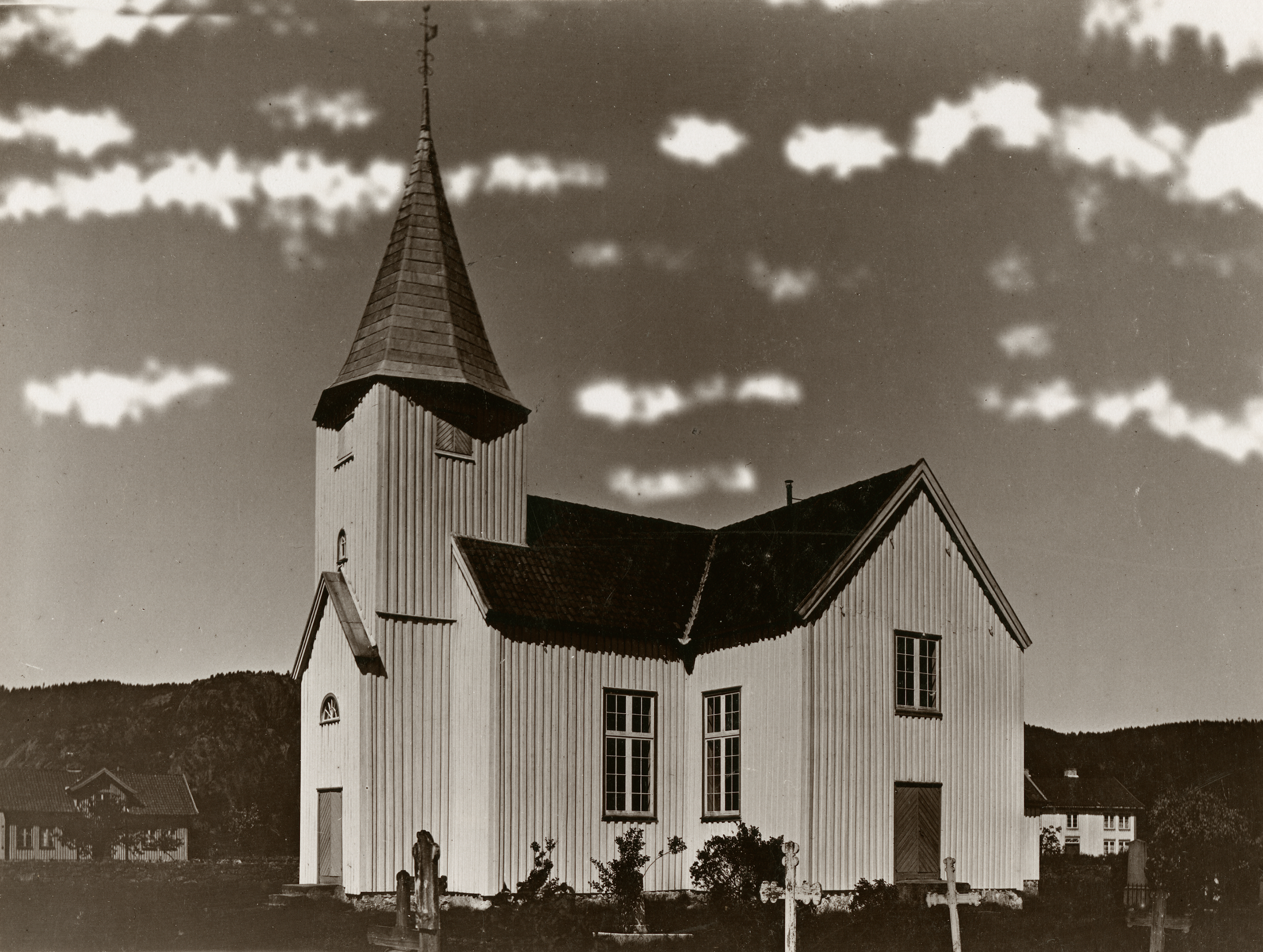
- View of the church
- Øyslebø Church
- 58.16727°N 07.55290°E
- Location: Lindesnes Municipality, Agder
- Country: Norway
- Denomination: Church of Norway
- Previous denomination: Catholic Church
- Churchmanship: Evangelical Lutheran

History
- Status: Parish church
- Founded: 13th century
- Consecrated: 1797

Architecture
- Functional status: Active
- Architect: Ole Vermundson Skjøllingstad
- Architectural type: Cruciform
- Completed: 1797 (229 years ago)

Specifications
- Capacity: 350
- Materials: Wood

Administration
- Diocese: Agder og Telemark
- Deanery: Lister og Mandal prosti
- Parish: Marnardal
- Norwegian Cultural Heritage Site
- Type: Church
- Status: Automatically protected
- ID: 85945

Øyslebø Church (Norwegian: Øyslebø kirke) is a parish church of the Church of Norway in Lindesnes Municipality in Agder county, Norway. It is located in the village of Øyslebø. It is one of the churches for the Marnardal parish which is part of the Lister og Mandal prosti (deanery) in the Diocese of Agder og Telemark. The white, wooden church was built in a cruciform design in 1797 using plans drawn up by the architect Ole Vermundson Skjøllingstad. The church seats about 350 people.

== History ==
The earliest existing historical records of the church date back to the year 1405, but it was not new at that time. The old stave church was likely built in the 13th century. In 1460 (or 1560), the old church was torn down and replaced with a new timber-framed building. A lot of the materials from the old church were reused in the construction of the new church. In 1797, the church building was torn down and a new cruciform church building was constructed on the same site.

== See also ==
- List of churches in Agder og Telemark
