= Mandalselva =

River in Agder, Norway

Mandalselva Mandalsåni / Marna
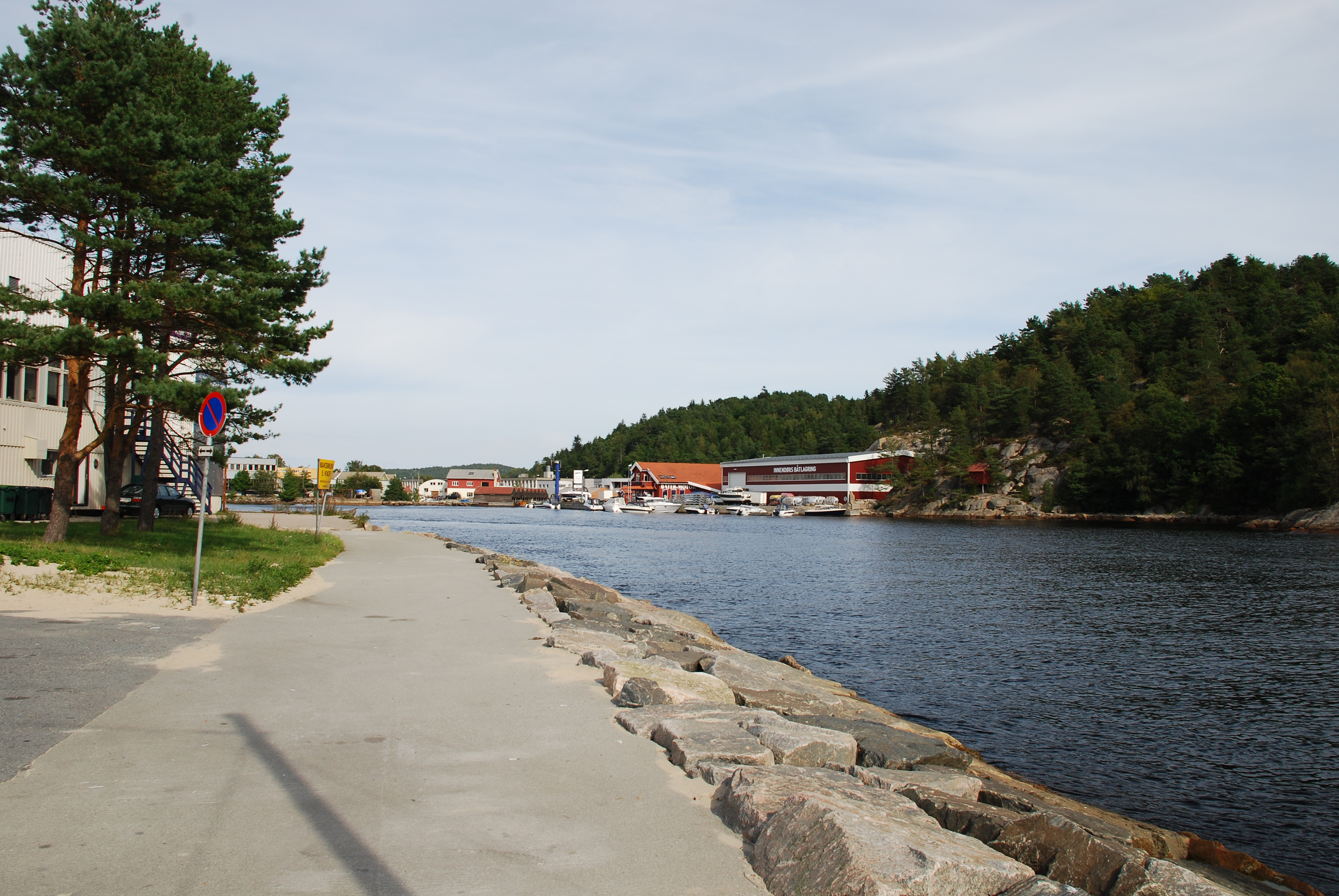
- The river mouth of Mandalselva by Sjøsanden in Mandal

Location
- Country: Norway
- County: Agder
- District: Sørlandet
- Municipality: Åseral Municipality, Lyngdal Municipality, Lindesnes Municipality

Physical characteristics
- Source: Øre lake
  - location: Åseral Municipality, Agder, Norway
  - coordinates: 58°34′42″N 07°23′48″E
  - elevation: 260 m (850 ft)
- Mouth: Mannefjorden
  - location: Mandal, Agder, Norway
  - coordinates: 58°01′12″N 07°27′26″E
  - elevation: 0 m (0 ft)
- Length: 115 km (71 mi)
- Basin size: 1,800 km^{2} (690 sq mi)
- Discharge
  - location: Kjølemo, Mandal
  - average: 85 m^{3}/s (3,000 cu ft/s)
  - maximum: 970 m^{3}/s (34,000 cu ft/s)

Mandalselva, Mandalsåni, or Marna (English: Mandal River, Old Norse: Mǫrn) is a river in Agder county in Norway. The river has its origins in the mountains between Ose in Setesdal and the Upper Sirdalen valley. The river flows south to its mouth at the North Sea at the town of Mandal. The river is 115 kilometres (71 mi) long and flows through Åseral Municipality, Lyngdal Municipality, and Lindesnes Municipality. The largest tributaries are Monn, Logna, Skjerka, Kosåna, Logåna, and Røyselandsbekken. The rivers Skjerka, Monn and Logna all flow into the lake Øre in Åseral Municipality which is considered the beginning of the main Mandalselva river. The river passes through the villages of Kylland, Bjelland, Laudal, Heddeland, Øyslebø, and Krossen.

== Hydropower development ==
Hydropower development of the river on a larger scale started in 1930. At present there are six power plants along the river and its upper tributaries: Logna, Smeland, Skjerka, Håverstad, Bjelland, and Laudal.

The drainage basin covers an area of 1,800 square kilometres (690 mi^{2}). The mean flow of water in the river is 85 cubic metres per second (3,000 cu ft/s). During flooding periods in the spring and autumn, water flow can be far greater. The highest stream flow in recent times were measured in October 1987, when it passed about 970 cubic metres per second (34,000 cu ft/s) at Kjølemoen in Holum.

== Salmon and trout ==
The original salmon stocks are extinct as a result of acid rain, but extensive liming has led to a better environment in the river, and a new salmon stocks are established. It was caught 8,785 kilograms (19,368 lb) of salmon and sea trout in Mandalselva in 2015.

== Media gallery ==
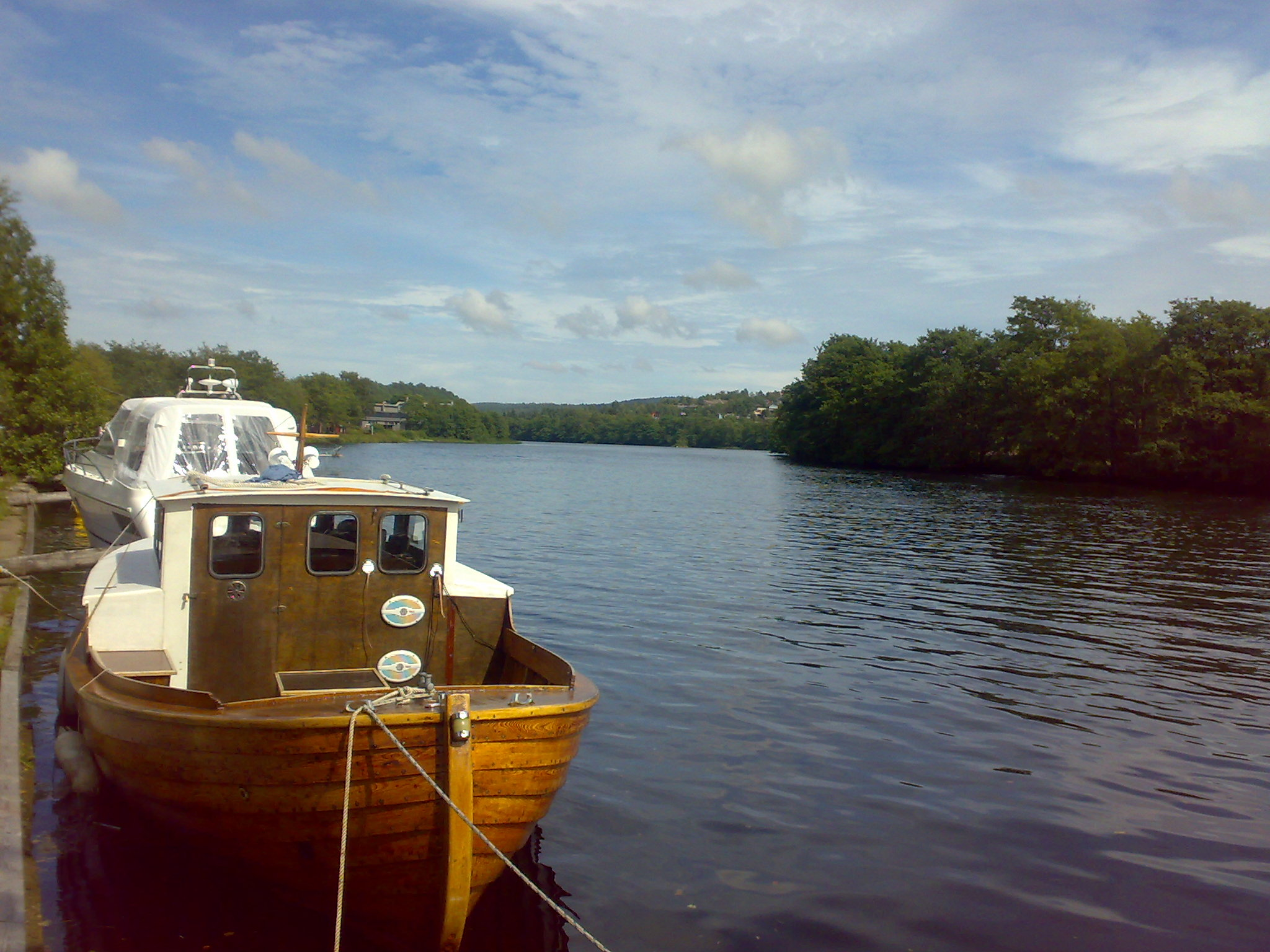
Mandalselva at Buøy

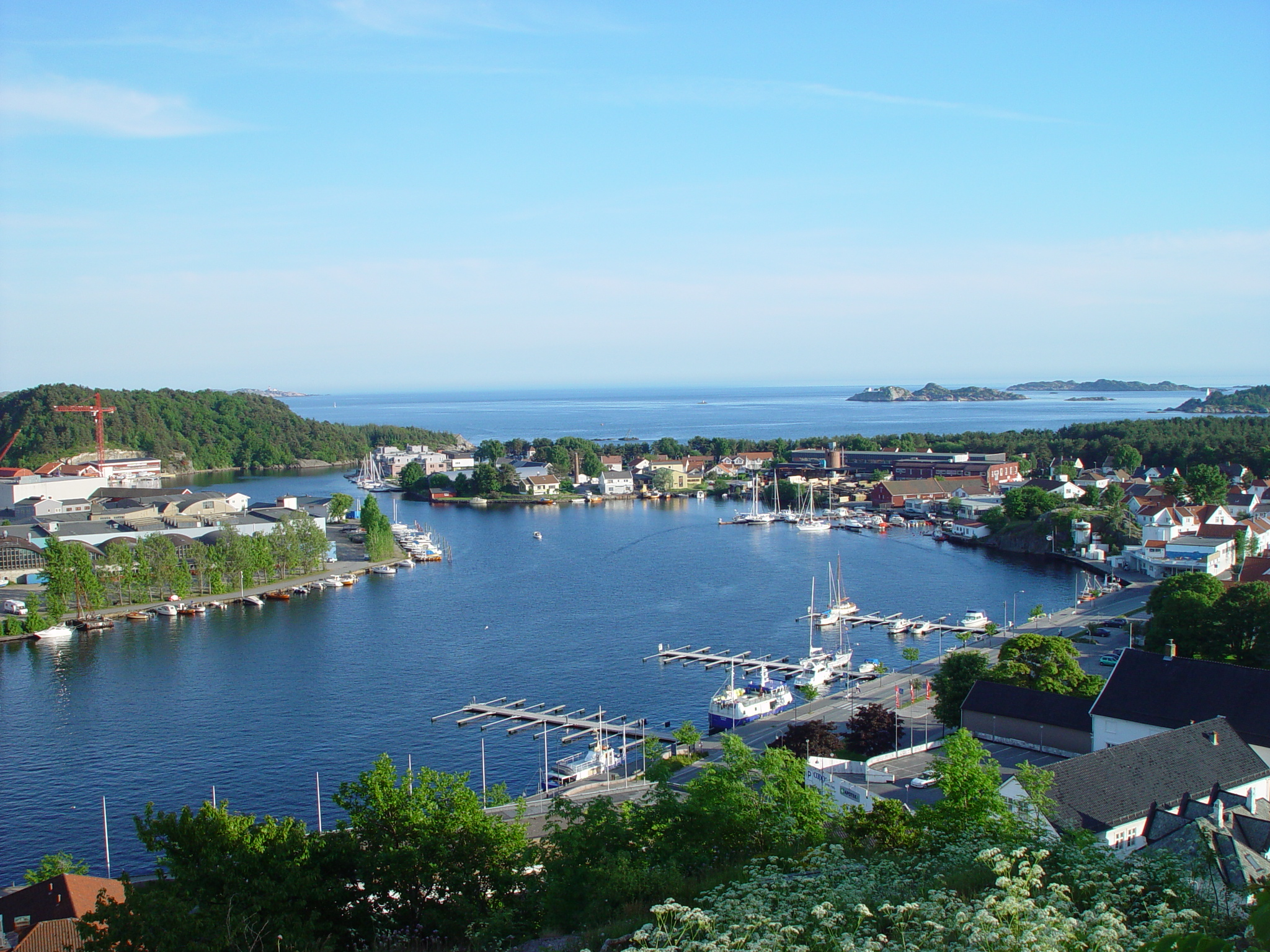
View of the Mandal harbor

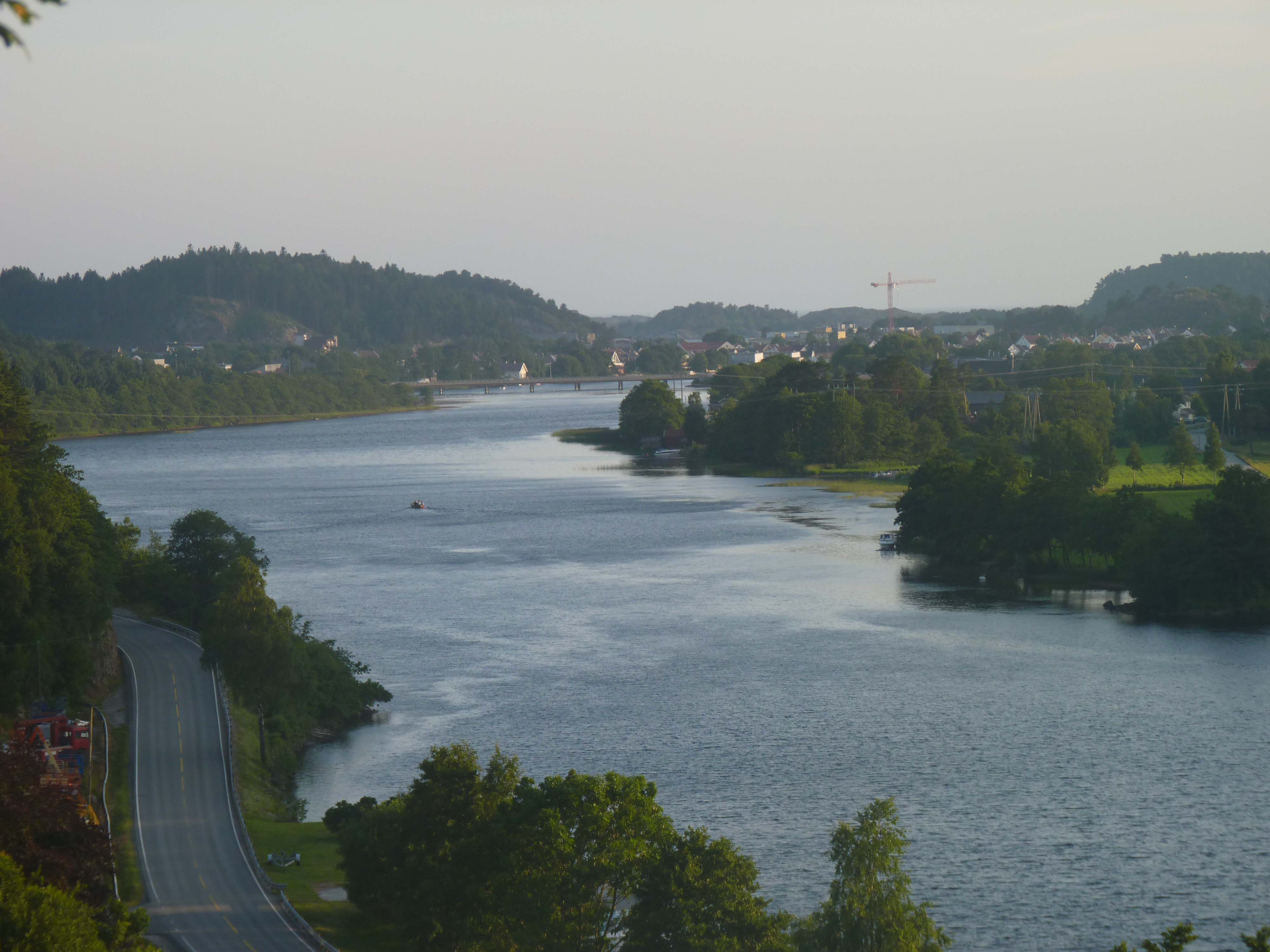
View of the river Marna

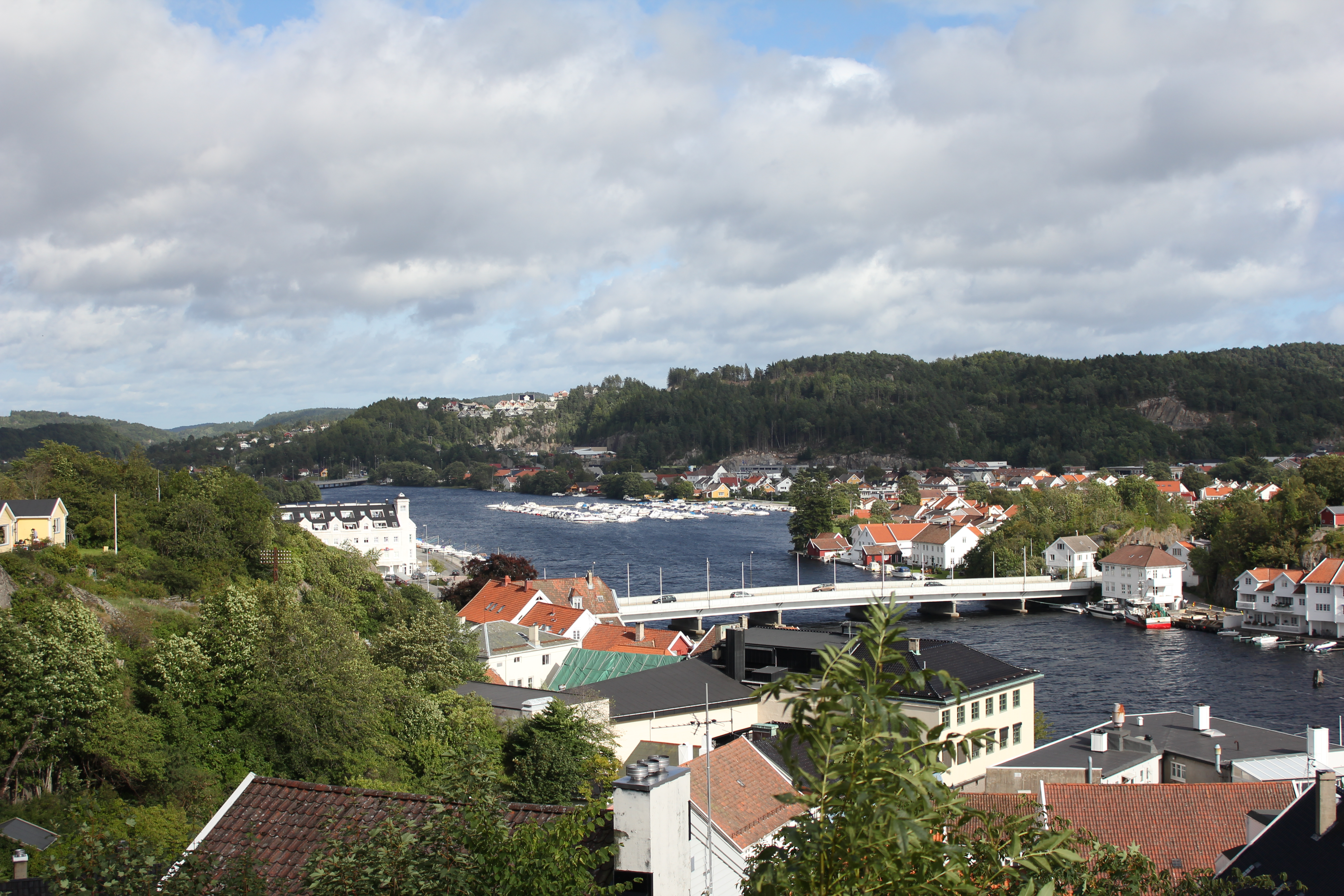
Mandal bridge
