= Øyslebø =

Village in Lindesnes Municipality, Norway

- Village
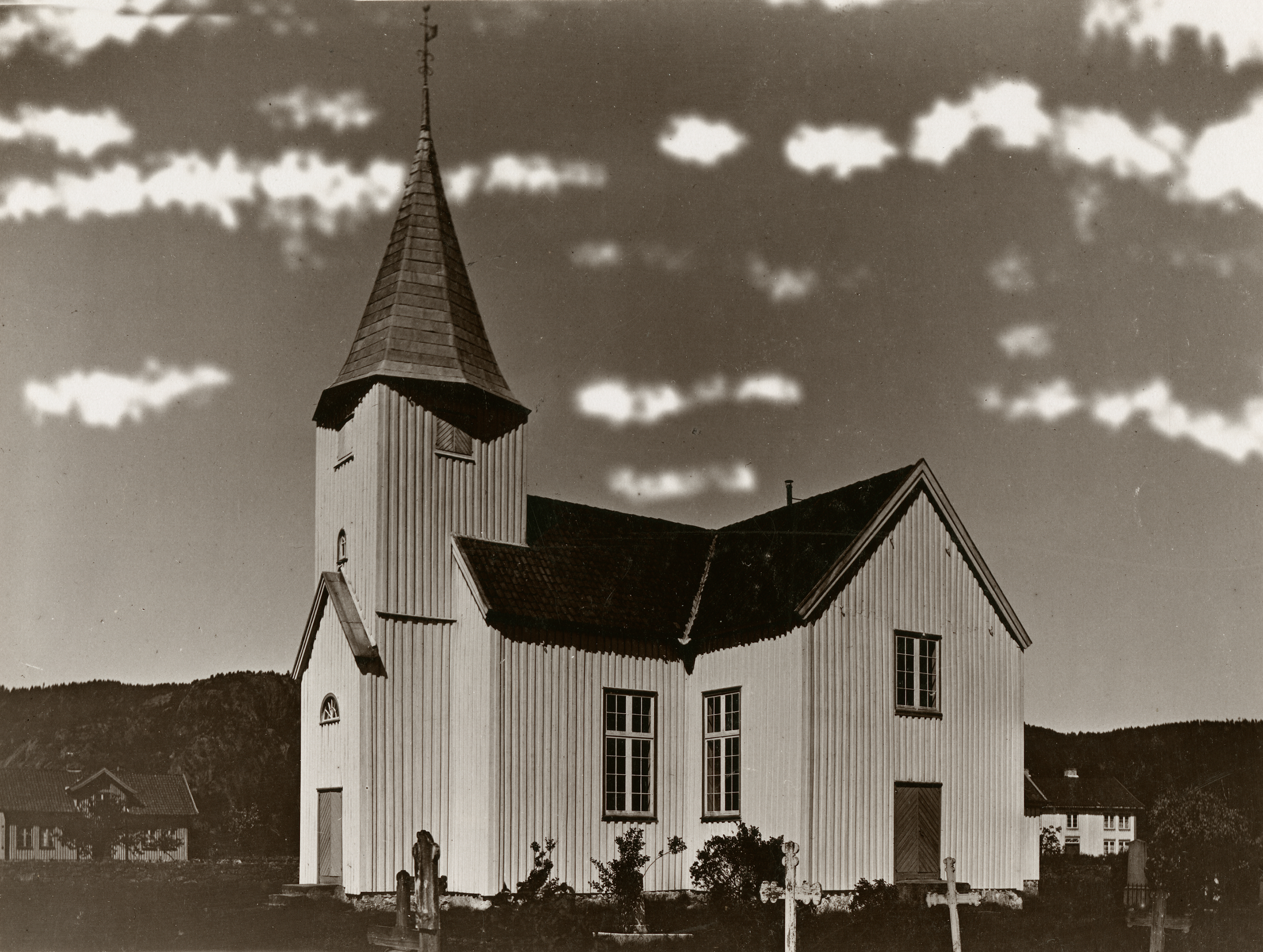
- View of the village church (c. 1900)
- Interactive map of Øyslebø
- Coordinates: 58.16744°N 7.5516°E
- Country: Norway
- Region: Southern Norway
- County: Agder
- Municipality: Lindesnes Municipality

Area
  - Total: 0.4 km^{2} (0.15 sq mi)
- Elevation: 27 m (89 ft)

Population (2025)
  - Total: 361
  - Density: 903/km^{2} (2,340/sq mi)
- Time zone: UTC+01:00 (CET)
  - Summer (DST): UTC+02:00 (CEST)
- Post Code: 4532 Øyslebø

Øyslebø is a village in Lindesnes Municipality in Agder county, Norway. The village is located in the Mandalen valley along the Mandalselva river, about 21 kilometres (13 mi) north of the town of Mandal. The Sørlandet Line passes the village to the north, stopping at the Marnardal Station, about 5 kilometres (3.1 mi) north of Øyslebø on the north side of the village of Heddeland. Øyslebø Church is located in the village.

The 0.4-square-kilometre (99-acre) village has a population (2025) of 361 and a population density of 903 inhabitants per square kilometre (2,340/sq mi).

== History ==
Øyslebø was the administrative centre of the old Øyslebø Municipality which existed from 1899 until 1964.

=== Name ===
The village of Øyslebø (Old Norse: Øyðslubœr) is named after the old Øyslebø farm, where Øyslebø Church is located. The name is derived from the old river name, Øyðsla. The name was historically spelled Øslebø or Øislebø.
