= Bjelland (disambiguation) =

Bjelland may refer to:

== People ==
- Bjelland (surname), a list of people with the surname Bjelland

== Places ==
- Bjelland, a village in Lindesnes Municipality in Agder county, Norway
- Bjelland, Flekkefjord, a village in Flekkefjord Municipality in Agder county, Norway
- Bjelland Church, a church in Lindesnes Municipality in Agder county, Norway
- Bjelland Municipality, a former municipality in the old Vest-Agder county, Norway
- Bjelland og Grindum Municipality, a former municipality in the old Vest-Agder county, Norway
- Bjelland Point, a headland on the island of South Georgia of the British territory of South Georgia and the South Sandwich Islands
