= Audnedal Municipality =

Former municipality in Vest-Agder, Norway

Audnedal Municipality Audnedal kommune
- Former municipality
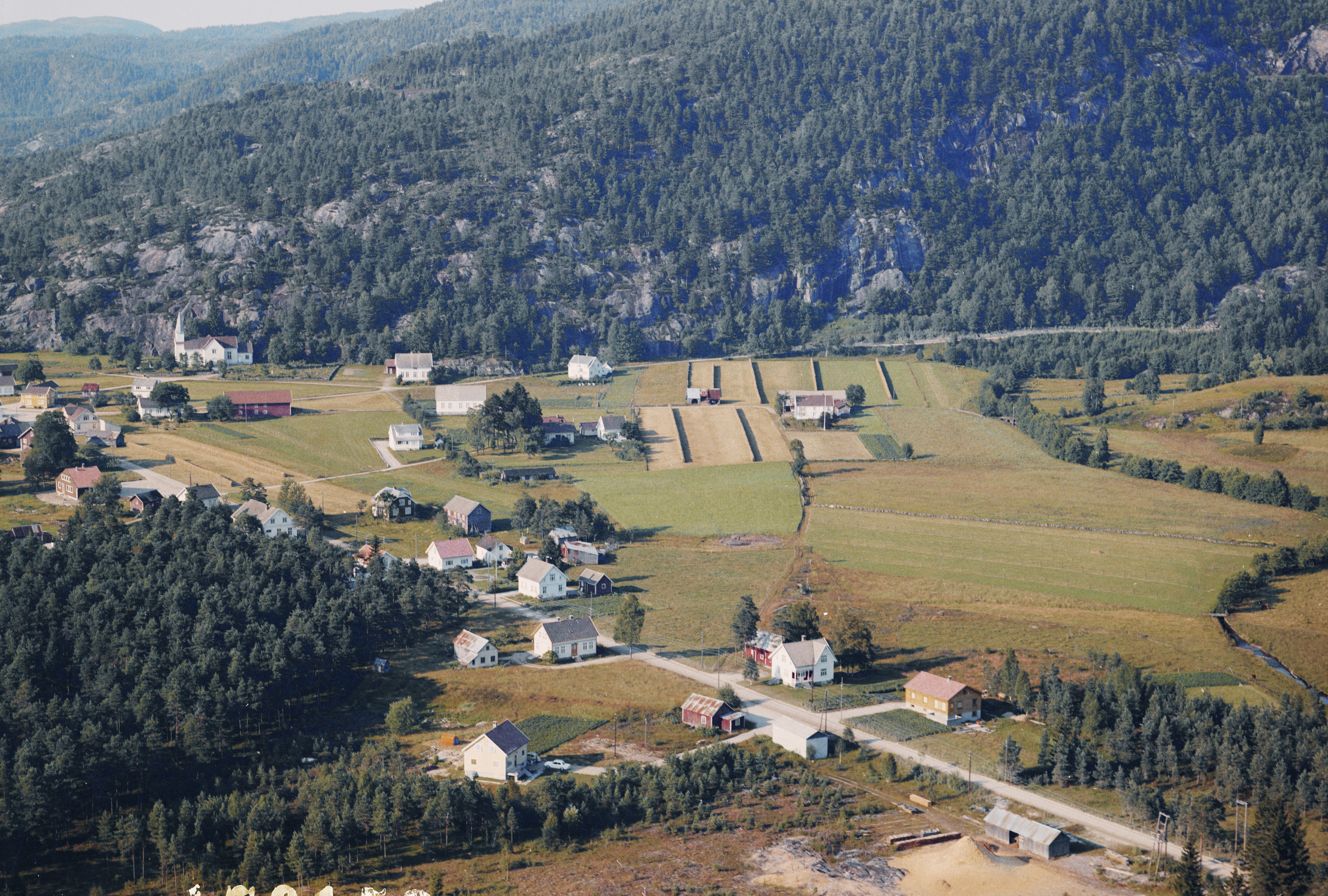
- View of the Konsmo area (c. 1966)

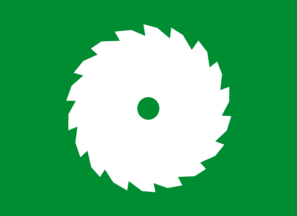
- Flag Coat of arms

- Vest-Agder within Norway

- Audnedal within Vest-Agder
- Coordinates: 58°22′48″N 07°22′12″E
- Country: Norway
- County: Vest-Agder
- District: Sørlandet
- Established: 1 Jan 1964
  - Preceded by: Konsmo Municipality and Grindheim Municipality
- Disestablished: 1 Jan 2020
  - Succeeded by: Lyngdal Municipality
- Administrative centre: Konsmo

Government
  - Mayor (2015–2019): Reidun Bakken (KrF)

Area (upon dissolution)
  - Total: 251.46 km^{2} (97.09 sq mi)
  - Land: 236.05 km^{2} (91.14 sq mi)
  - Water: 15.41 km^{2} (5.95 sq mi)
  - Rank: #302 in Norway
- Highest elevation: 578.1 m (1,897 ft)

Population (2019)
  - Total: 1,780
  - Rank: #338 in Norway
  - Density: 7.5/km^{2} (19/sq mi)
  - Change (10 years): ▲ +9.2%
- Demonym: Audnedøl

Official language
  - Norwegian form: Neutral
- Time zone: UTC+01:00 (CET)
  - Summer (DST): UTC+02:00 (CEST)
- ISO 3166 code: NO-1027

Audnedal is a former municipality in the old Vest-Agder county, Norway. The 251.46-square-kilometre (97.09 sq mi) municipality existed from 1964 until its dissolution in 2020. The area is now part of Lyngdal Municipality in the traditional district of Sørlandet in Agder county. The administrative centre was the village of Konsmo. Other villages in the municipality included Byremo and Vivlemo.

Prior to its dissolution in 2020, the 251.46-square-kilometre (97.09 sq mi) municipality was the 302nd largest by area out of the 422 municipalities in Norway. Audnedal Municipality was the 338th most populous municipality in Norway with a population of about 1,780. The municipality's population density was 7.5 inhabitants per square kilometre (19/sq mi) and its population had increased by 9.2% over the previous 10-year period.

== General information ==
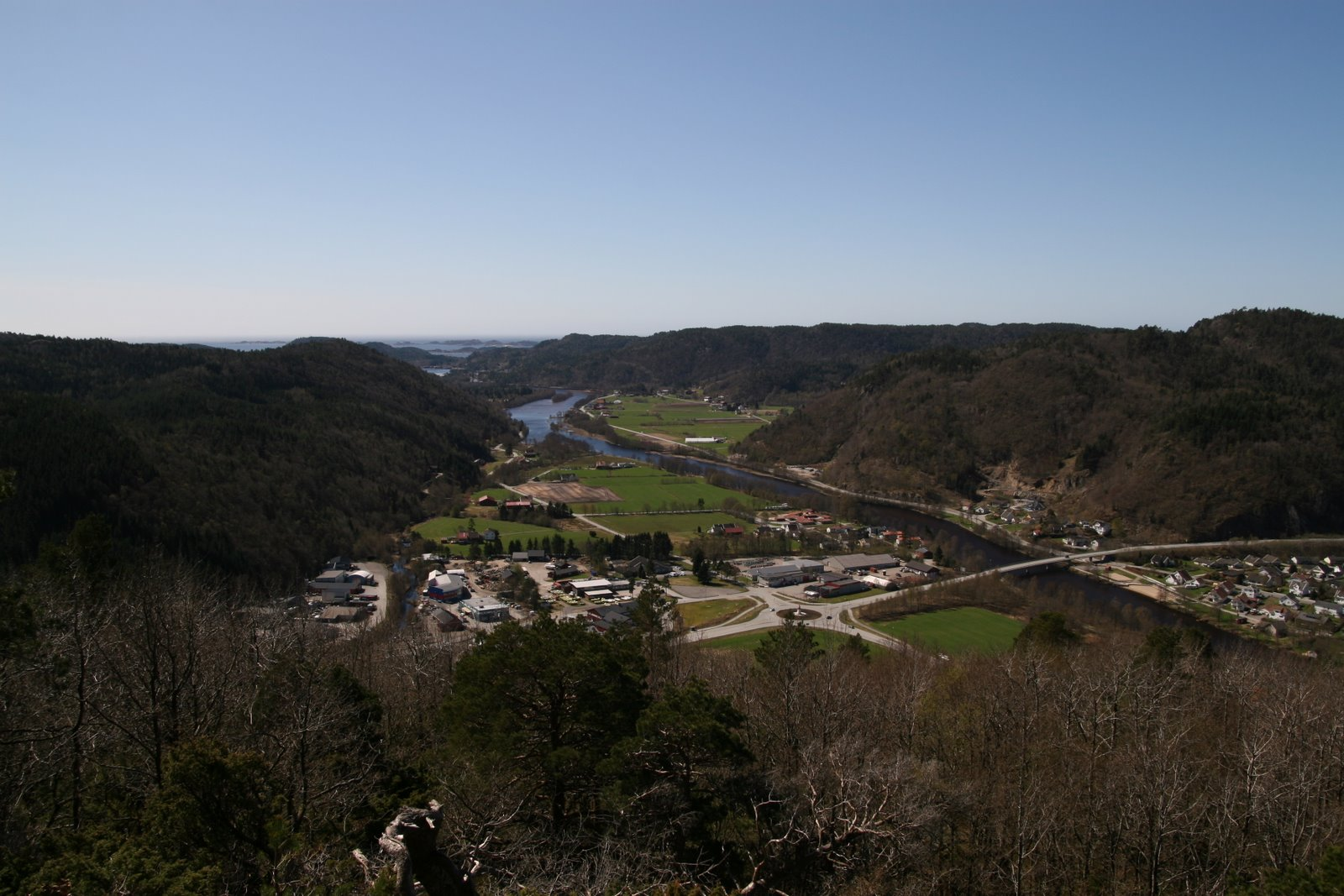
View of the Audnedalen valley

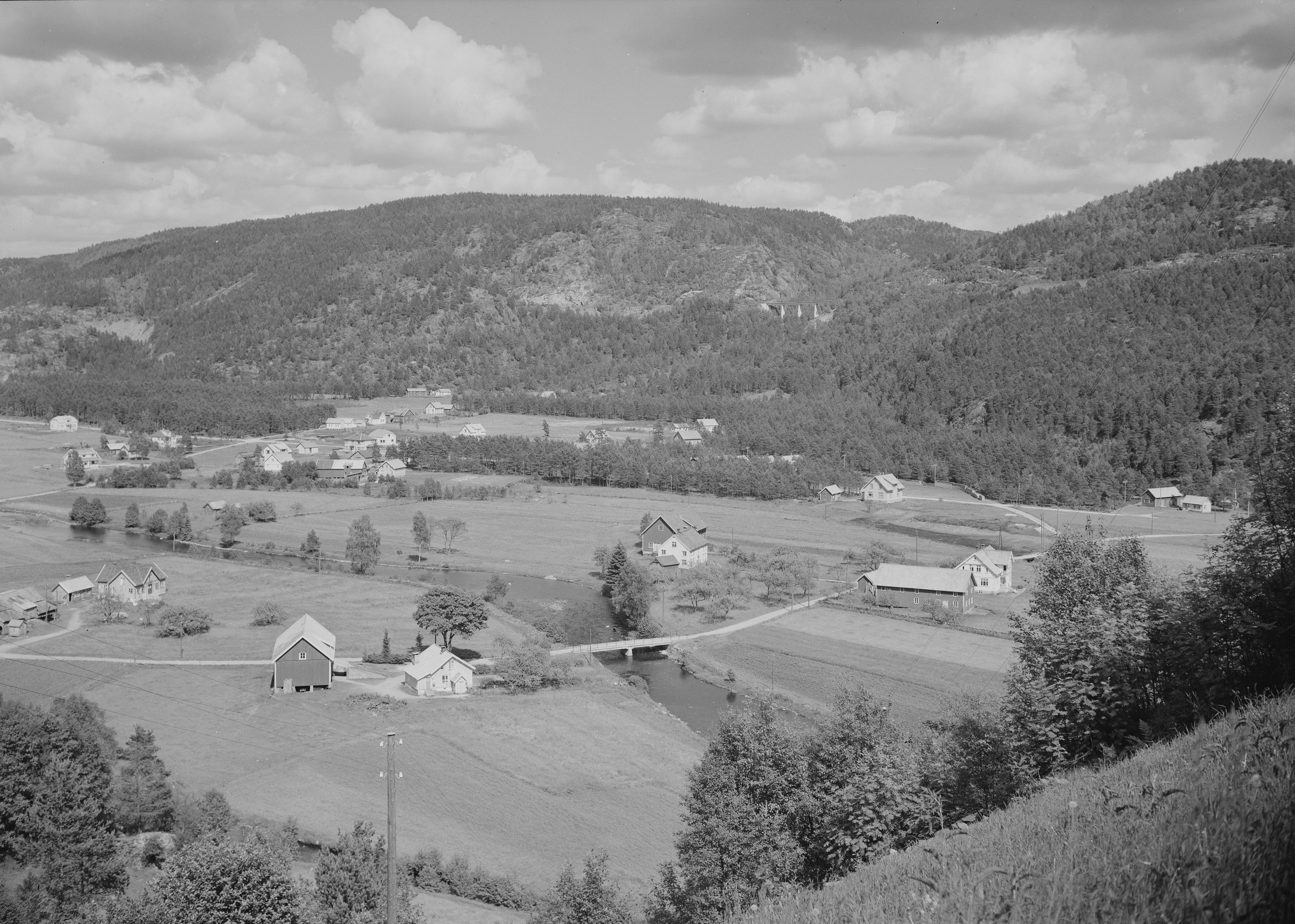
View of the Audnedal area (c. 1953)

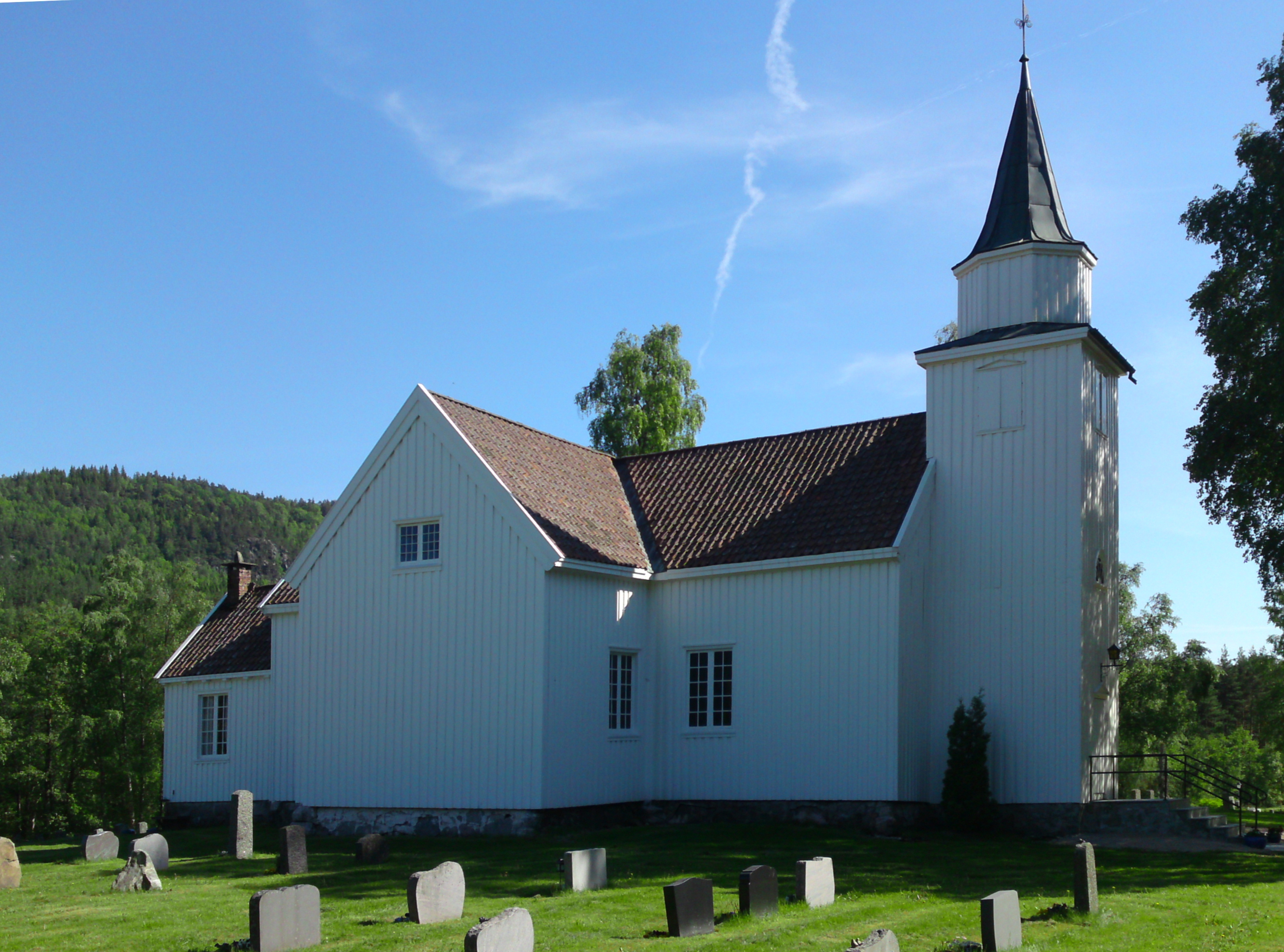
View of the Grindheim Church

The old Undal Municipality was established on 1 January 1838 (see formannskapsdistrikt law). That municipality was short-lived and only existed for seven years. In 1845 it was split into two new municipalities: the rural northern district (population: 802) became the new Nordre Undal Municipality and the southern district (population: 3,893) became the new Søndre Undal Municipality. Those two municipalities were later divided as well. Søndre Undal Municipality was divided into Spangereid Municipality and Sør-Audnedal Municipality in 1899 and Nordre Undal Municipality was divided into Konsmo Municipality and Vigmostad Municipality in 1911.

During the 1960s, there were many municipal mergers across Norway due to the work of the Schei Committee. Audnedal Municipality was established on 1 January 1964 when the following areas were merged to form it. This new Audnedal Municipality mostly corresponded to the historical borders of the old Nordre Undal Municipality.

- all of Konsmo Municipality (population: 712)
- all of Grindheim Municipality (population: 701)
- the Ågedal and Midtbø areas (population: 96) of Bjelland Municipality

On 1 January 2020, Audnedal Municipality was merged with the neighboring Lyngdal Municipality to form a new, larger Lyngdal Municipality.

=== Name ===
The municipality (originally the parish) is named after the Audnedalen valley (Old Norse: Auðnudalr). The first element is the genitive case of the river name Auðna (now Audna). The river name is derived from the word auðn which means "destruction" or "wasteland" (because of the flooding that often happens along the river). The last element is dalr which means "valley" or "dale".

=== Coat of arms ===
The coat of arms was granted on 30 August 1991 and in use until 1 January 2020 when the municipality was dissolved. The official blazon is "Vert, a circular sawblade argent" (Norwegian: I grønt et sølv sirkelsagblad). This means the arms have a green field (background) and the charge is a circular sawblade. The sawblade has a tincture of argent which means it is commonly colored white, but if it is made out of metal, then silver is used. The green color in the field and the sawblade was chosen to represent the importance of the timber and forestry industries in the municipality. The municipal flag has the same design as the coat of arms.

=== Churches ===
The Church of Norway had two parishes (sokn) within Audnedal Municipality. It is part of the Mandal prosti (deanery) in the Diocese of Agder og Telemark.

Churches in Audnedal Municipality
Parish (sokn)	Church name	Location of the church	Year built
Grindheim	Grindheim Church	Byremo	1783
Konsmo	Konsmo Church	Konsmo	1802

== Government ==
While it existed, Audnedal Municipality was responsible for primary education (through 10th grade), outpatient health services, senior citizen services, welfare and other social services, zoning, economic development, and municipal roads and utilities. The municipality was governed by a municipal council of directly elected representatives. The mayor was indirectly elected by a vote of the municipal council. The municipality was under the jurisdiction of the Kristiansand District Court and the Agder Court of Appeal.

=== Municipal council ===
The municipal council (Kommunestyre) of Audnedal Municipality was made up of 17 representatives that were elected to four year terms. The tables below show the historical composition of the council by political party.

Audnedal kommunestyre 2015–2019
Party name (in Norwegian)	Number of representatives
Labour Party (Arbeiderpartiet)	3
Progress Party (Fremskrittspartiet)	1
Conservative Party (Høyre)	1
Christian Democratic Party (Kristelig Folkeparti)	4
Centre Party (Senterpartiet)	3
Local list for Audnedal (Bygdelista for Audnedal)	5
Total number of members:	17
Note: On 1 January 2020, Audnedal Municipality became part of Lyngdal Municipality.

Audnedal kommunestyre 2011–2015
Party name (in Norwegian)	Number of representatives
Labour Party (Arbeiderpartiet)	3
Conservative Party (Høyre)	1
Christian Democratic Party (Kristelig Folkeparti)	5
Centre Party (Senterpartiet)	1
Local list for Upper Audnedal (Bygdelista for øvre del av Audnedal)	7
Total number of members:	17

Audnedal kommunestyre 2007–2011
Party name (in Norwegian)	Number of representatives
Labour Party (Arbeiderpartiet)	2
Conservative Party (Høyre)	1
Christian Democratic Party (Kristelig Folkeparti)	5
Centre Party (Senterpartiet)	2
Local list for Upper Audnedal (Bygdeliste for øvre del av Audnedal)	7
Total number of members:	17

Audnedal kommunestyre 2003–2007
Party name (in Norwegian)	Number of representatives
Labour Party (Arbeiderpartiet)	4
Conservative Party (Høyre)	1
Christian Democratic Party (Kristelig Folkeparti)	5
Centre Party (Senterpartiet)	2
Local list for Upper Audnedal (Bygdeliste for øvre del av Audnedal)	5
Total number of members:	17

Audnedal kommunestyre 1999–2003
Party name (in Norwegian)	Number of representatives
Labour Party (Arbeiderpartiet)	3
Conservative Party (Høyre)	1
Christian Democratic Party (Kristelig Folkeparti)	5
Centre Party (Senterpartiet)	3
Local list for Upper Audnedal (Bygdeliste for Øvre Audnedal)	5
Total number of members:	17

Audnedal kommunestyre 1995–1999
Party name (in Norwegian)	Number of representatives
Labour Party (Arbeiderpartiet)	6
Conservative Party (Høyre)	1
Christian Democratic Party (Kristelig Folkeparti)	5
Centre Party (Senterpartiet)	4
Local list for Upper Audnedal (Bygdeliste for øvre del av Audnedal kommune)	5
Total number of members:	21

Audnedal kommunestyre 1991–1995
Party name (in Norwegian)	Number of representatives
Labour Party (Arbeiderpartiet)	5
Conservative Party (Høyre)	1
Christian Democratic Party (Kristelig Folkeparti)	3
Centre Party (Senterpartiet)	7
Local list for Upper Audnedal (Bygdeliste for øvre del av Audnedal kommune)	5
Total number of members:	21

Audnedal kommunestyre 1987–1991
Party name (in Norwegian)	Number of representatives
Labour Party (Arbeiderpartiet)	7
Conservative Party (Høyre)	2
Christian Democratic Party (Kristelig Folkeparti)	5
Centre Party (Senterpartiet)	7
Total number of members:	21

Audnedal kommunestyre 1983–1987
Party name (in Norwegian)	Number of representatives
Labour Party (Arbeiderpartiet)	7
Conservative Party (Høyre)	2
Christian Democratic Party (Kristelig Folkeparti)	4
Centre Party (Senterpartiet)	8
Total number of members:	21

Audnedal kommunestyre 1979–1983
Party name (in Norwegian)	Number of representatives
Labour Party (Arbeiderpartiet)	8
Conservative Party (Høyre)	2
Christian Democratic Party (Kristelig Folkeparti)	5
Cross-party list (Tverrpolitisk liste)	6
Total number of members:	21

Audnedal kommunestyre 1975–1979
Party name (in Norwegian)	Number of representatives
Labour Party (Arbeiderpartiet)	6
Christian Democratic Party (Kristelig Folkeparti)	5
Centre Party (Senterpartiet)	3
Cross-party list (Tverrpolitisk Liste)	7
Total number of members:	21

Audnedal kommunestyre 1971–1975
Party name (in Norwegian)	Number of representatives
Labour Party (Arbeiderpartiet)	6
Christian Democratic Party (Kristelig Folkeparti)	4
Centre Party (Senterpartiet)	7
Liberal Party (Venstre)	4
Total number of members:	21

Audnedal kommunestyre 1967–1971
Party name (in Norwegian)	Number of representatives
Labour Party (Arbeiderpartiet)	7
Christian Democratic Party (Kristelig Folkeparti)	3
Centre Party (Senterpartiet)	8
Liberal Party (Venstre)	3
Total number of members:	21

Audnedal kommunestyre 1964–1967
Party name (in Norwegian)	Number of representatives
Labour Party (Arbeiderpartiet)	8
Christian Democratic Party (Kristelig Folkeparti)	2
Centre Party (Senterpartiet)	8
Liberal Party (Venstre)	3
Total number of members:	21

=== Mayors ===
The mayor (Nynorsk: ordførar) of Audnedal Municipality was the political leader of the municipality and the chairperson of the municipal council. The following people have held this position:

- 1964–1971: Nils Øydna (Sp)
- 1971–1975: John Seland (Sp)
- 1975–1979: Peder Birkeland (LL)
- 1979–1983: Knut B. Strisland (Ap)
- 1983–1987: Ragnvald Heåk (Sp)
- 1987–1991: Torkel Mydland (KrF)
- 1991–1995: Magne Bråtveit (Sp)
- 1995–1999: Sigrid Bendixen (Ap)
- 1999–2003: Torkel Mydland (KrF)
- 2003-2015: Tønnes Seland (Sp)
- 2015-2019: Reidun Bakken (KrF)

== Geography ==
Audnedal Municipality was an inland municipality, located in the Audnedalen valley which follows the river Audna. Åseral Municipality bordered it to the north, Hægebostad Municipality to the west, Lyngdal Municipality and Lindesnes Municipality to the south, and Marnardal Municipality to the east. To the northeast, Audnedal Municipality bordered Evje og Hornnes Municipality in neighboring Aust-Agder county.

Audnedal Municipality had two large lakes: Ytre Øydnavatnet and Øvre Øydnavatnet. The Mandalselva river also passed through the northern part of the municipality. The highest point in the municipality was the 578.1-metre (1,897 ft) tall mountain Ørnemyrfjellet.

=== Climate ===
Climate data for Konsmo
Month	Jan	Feb	Mar	Apr	May	Jun	Jul	Aug	Sep	Oct	Nov	Dec	Year
Mean daily maximum °C (°F)	−0.1 (31.8)	0.5 (32.9)	2.9 (37.2)	7.3 (45.1)	13.2 (55.8)	17.6 (63.7)	18.6 (65.5)	17.9 (64.2)	13.4 (56.1)	9.3 (48.7)	4.5 (40.1)	1.6 (34.9)	8.9 (48.0)
Daily mean °C (°F)	−2.1 (28.2)	−2.1 (28.2)	0.2 (32.4)	3.6 (38.5)	8.8 (47.8)	12.9 (55.2)	14.2 (57.6)	13.4 (56.1)	9.9 (49.8)	6.6 (43.9)	2.2 (36.0)	−0.7 (30.7)	5.6 (42.1)
Mean daily minimum °C (°F)	−4.7 (23.5)	−5.0 (23.0)	−2.6 (27.3)	0.1 (32.2)	4.8 (40.6)	8.5 (47.3)	9.9 (49.8)	9.5 (49.1)	7.0 (44.6)	3.9 (39.0)	−0.2 (31.6)	−3.1 (26.4)	2.3 (36.1)
Average precipitation mm (inches)	154 (6.1)	104 (4.1)	107 (4.2)	70 (2.8)	104 (4.1)	91 (3.6)	102 (4.0)	146 (5.7)	195 (7.7)	217 (8.5)	210 (8.3)	160 (6.3)	1,660 (65.4)
Average precipitation days (≥ 1 mm)	15.8	10.7	13	9	11	10	10.5	11.9	15.6	16.1	17.7	15.7	157
Source: Norwegian Meteorological Institute

== Attractions ==
- "Blomliknuten" hiking trail
- Sveindal museum
- Fishing for salmon in the Mandalselva river
