= Grindheim =

Grindheim may refer to:

== People ==
- Christian Grindheim (born 1983), a Norwegian footballer

== Places ==
- Grindheim Municipality, a former municipality in the old Vest-Agder county, Norway
- Grindheim, Agder, a small farm area in the northern part of the village of Byremo in Lyngdal Municipality in Agder county, Norway
- Grindheim Church (Agder), a church in Lyngdal Municipality in Agder county, Norway
- Grindheim Church (Vestland), a church in Etne Municipality in Vestland county, Norway

== See also ==
- Bjelland og Grindum Municipality, a former municipality in the old Vest-Agder county, Norway
