= Bjelland og Grindum Municipality =

Former municipality in Vest-Agder, Norway

Bjelland og Grindum Municipality Bjelland og Grindum herred
- Former municipality
- Vest-Agder within Norway

- Bjelland og Grindum within Vest-Agder
- Coordinates: 58°26′24″N 07°25′02″E
- Country: Norway
- County: Vest-Agder
- District: Sørlandet
- Established: 1 Jan 1838
  - Created as: Formannskapsdistrikt
- Disestablished: 1 Jan 1902
  - Succeeded by: Bjelland Municipality and Grindheim Municipality
- Administrative centre: Bjelland

Area (upon dissolution)
  - Total: 294.1 km^{2} (113.6 sq mi)
- Highest elevation: 511.78 m (1,679.1 ft)

Population (1902)
  - Total: 1,816
  - Density: 6.175/km^{2} (15.99/sq mi)
- Demonym(s): Bjelldøl; Grinddøl
- Time zone: UTC+01:00 (CET)
  - Summer (DST): UTC+02:00 (CEST)
- ISO 3166 code: NO-1024

Bjelland og Grindum (or sometimes Bjelland og Grindheim) is a former municipality in the old Vest-Agder county, Norway. The 294.1-square-kilometre (113.6 sq mi) municipality existed from 1838 until its dissolution in 1902. The area is now divided between Lindesnes Municipality and Lyngdal Municipality in the traditional district of Lister in Agder county. The administrative centre was the village of Bjelland where Bjelland Church is located.

== General information ==
The old (large) parish of Bjelland was divided on 1 January 1838 into two municipalities under the new formannskapsdistrikt law. The northern district became Aaseral Municipality and the southern district became the new Bjelland og Grindum Municipality. The area of Bjelland og Grindum had a population of 1,662 in 1835, just before the split.

On 1 January 1902, Bjelland og Grindum Municipality was dissolved and divided into two new municipalities. The eastern areas (population: 907) became the new Bjelland Municipality and the western areas (population: 909) became the new Grindum Municipality. (These municipalities later became parts of Audnedal Municipality and Marnardal Municipality in the 1960s and in 2020, they became part of Lyngdal Municipality and Lindesnes Municipality respectively).

=== Name ===
The old parishes of Bjelland and Grindum were merged in 1838 and the new, resulting municipality was given the compound name Bjelland og Grindum, literally meaning "Bjelland and Grindum".

The parish of Bjelland is named after the old Bjelland farm (Old Norse: Bjárland) since the first Bjelland Church was built there. The first element is the genitive case of the word bœr which means "farm" or "farmstead". The last element is land which means "land" or "district".

The parish of Grindum is named after the old Grindum farm (Old Norse: Grindeimr) since the first Grindheim Church was built there. The first element is grind which means "gate" or "fence". The last element is heimr which means "home" or "abode".

=== Churches ===
The Church of Norway had one parish (sokn) within Bjelland og Grindum Municipality. At the time of the municipal dissolution, it was part of the Bjelland prestegjeld and the Mandal prosti (deanery) in the Diocese of Agder.

Churches in Bjelland og Grindum Municipality
Parish (sokn)	Church name	Location of the church	Year built
Bjelland	Bjelland Church	Bjelland	1793
Grindheim	Grindheim Church	Byremo	1783

== Geography ==
The municipality was located in the upper Mandalen valley, along the border with Nedenes county. The highest point in the municipality was the 511.78-metre (1,679.1 ft) tall mountain Ørteknappknuten. Aaseral Municipality was located to the north, Hornnes Municipality (in Nedenes county) was located to the northeast, Hægeland Municipality was located to the east, Finsland Municipality was located to the southeast, Laudal Municipality was located to the south, Nordre Undal Municipality was located to the southwest, and Hægebostad Municipality was located to the west.

== Government ==
While it existed, Bjelland og Grindum Municipality was governed by a municipal council of directly elected representatives. The mayor was indirectly elected by a vote of the municipal council. The municipality was under the jurisdiction of the Mandal District Court and the Agder Court of Appeal.

=== Mayors ===
The mayor (Norwegian: ordfører) of Bjelland og Grindum Municipality was the political leader of the municipality and the chairperson of the municipal council. The following people have held this position:

- 1838–1838: Torkel Knutsen Foss
- 1839–1841: Torkel T. Roland
- 1842–1843: Reier D. Midbø
- 1844–1851: Torje L. Refsnes
- 1852–1853: Reier D. Midbø
- 1854–1860: H. Carlsen
- 1861–1864: Ole Å. Hesså
- 1865–1873: Kjetil Foss
- 1874–1879: Thore Foss
- 1880–1885: Anders Homme
- 1886–1898: Thore Foss
- 1899–1901: Søren Seland

== See also ==
- List of former municipalities of Norway
