= Audnedalen =

Valley in Agder, Norway

Audnedalen Audnedal
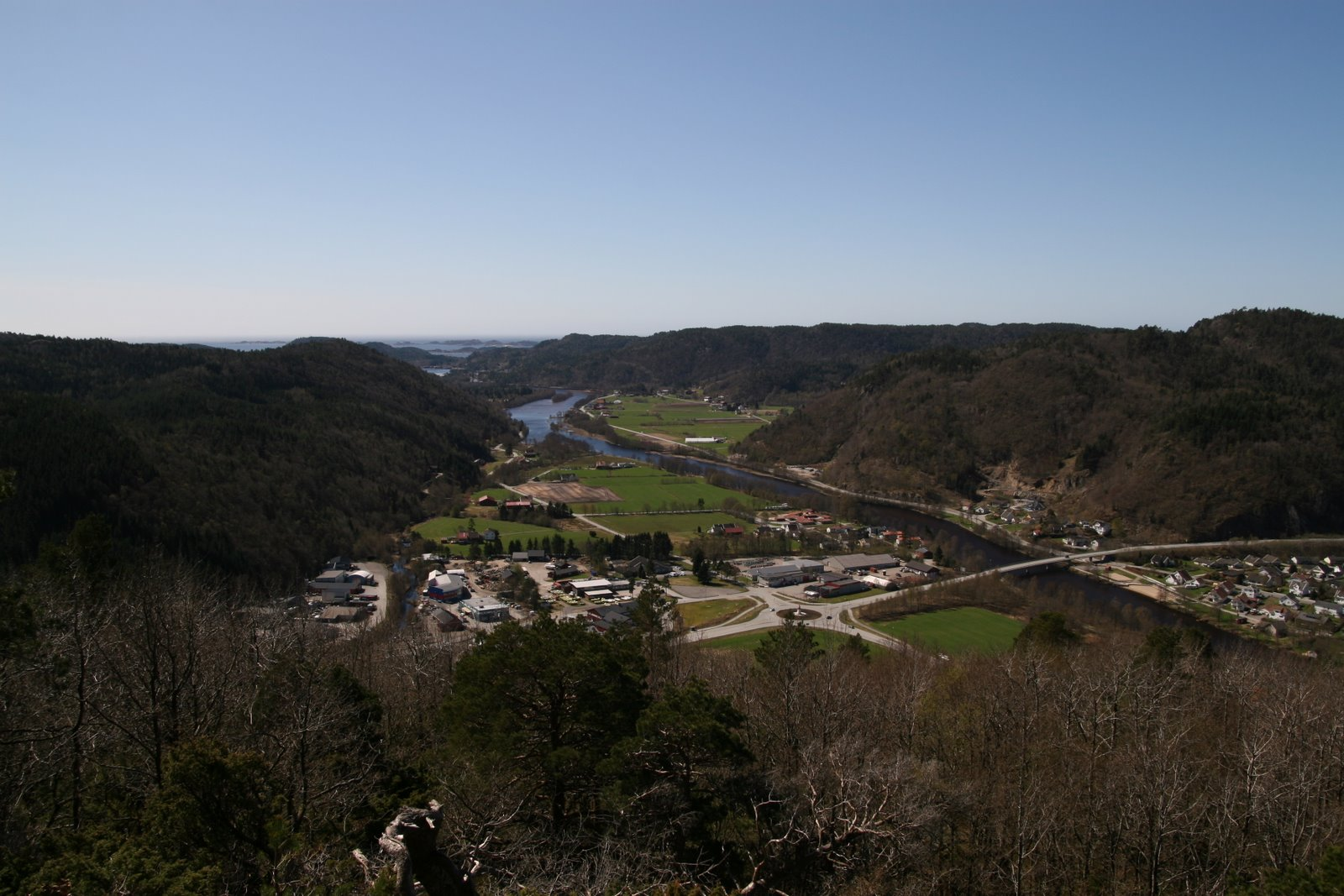
- View of the Audnedalen valley from Gampeheia
- Length: 50 kilometres (31 mi) N-S

Geology
- Type: River valley

Geography
- Location: Agder, Norway
- Population centers: Vigeland, Konsmo, Byremo
- Coordinates: 58°13′07″N 07°21′09″E
- Rivers: Audna

Location
- Interactive map of the valley

Audnedalen or Audnedal is the shortest of the six main north-south valleys in Agder county, Norway. The 50-kilometre (31 mi) long river valley runs through Lyngdal Municipality and Lindesnes Municipality. The river Audna runs through the valley, ending in Snigsfjorden in the south. The valley floor is flat and the sides are relatively steep. Since it is a rather short valley, it does not reach into the high moorland like other such valleys in the county.
