= Konsmo Municipality =

Former municipality in Vest-Agder, Norway

Konsmo Municipality Konsmo herred
- Former municipality
- Vest-Agder within Norway

- Konsmo within Vest-Agder
- Coordinates: 58°17′07″N 07°21′21″E
- Country: Norway
- County: Vest-Agder
- District: Sørlandet
- Established: 1 Jan 1911
  - Preceded by: Nordre Undal Municipality
- Disestablished: 1 Jan 1964
  - Succeeded by: Audnedal Municipality
- Administrative centre: Konsmo

Government
  - Mayor (1960–1963): John K. Gislefos

Area (upon dissolution)
  - Total: 107.2 km^{2} (41.4 sq mi)
  - Rank: #505 in Norway
- Highest elevation: 517 m (1,696 ft)

Population (1963)
  - Total: 714
  - Rank: #655 in Norway
  - Density: 6.7/km^{2} (17/sq mi)
  - Change (10 years): ▼ −17.4%
- Demonym: Konsmosokning

Official language
  - Norwegian form: Bokmål
- Time zone: UTC+01:00 (CET)
  - Summer (DST): UTC+02:00 (CEST)
- ISO 3166 code: NO-1027

Konsmo is a former municipality in the old Vest-Agder county, Norway. The 107.2-square-kilometre (41.4 sq mi) municipality existed from 1911 until its dissolution in 1964. The area is now part of Lyngdal Municipality in the traditional district of Lister in Agder county. The administrative centre was the village of Konsmo where Konsmo Church is located.

Prior to its dissolution in 1963, the 107.2-square-kilometre (41.4 sq mi) municipality was the 505th largest by area out of the 689 municipalities in Norway. Konsmo Municipality was the 655th most populous municipality in Norway with a population of about 714. The municipality's population density was 6.7 inhabitants per square kilometre (17/sq mi) and its population had decreased by 17.4% over the previous 10-year period.

== General information ==
The municipality of Konsmo was established on 1 January 1911 when the old Nordre Undal Municipality was divided into two municipalities: the northern district (population: 782) became the new Konsmo Municipality and the southern district (population: 923) became the new Vigmostad Municipality.

During the 1960s, there were many municipal mergers across Norway due to the work of the Schei Committee. On 1 January 1964, Konsmo Municipality was dissolved and the following areas were merged to form the new Audnedal Municipality:

- all of Grindheim Municipality (population: 701)
- all of Konsmo Municipality (population: 712)
- the Ågedal and Midtbø areas of Bjelland Municipality (population: 96)

=== Name ===
The municipality (originally the parish) is named after the old Konsmo farm (Old Norse: Konungsmór) since the first Konsmo Church was built there. The first element is the genitive case of konungr which means "king". The last element is mór which means "moorland" or "heath". This name in modern Norwegian would be Kongsmoen, meaning "King's moor". Over time, the name was corrupted to Konsmo.

=== Churches ===
The Church of Norway had one parish (sokn) within Konsmo Municipality. At the time of the municipal dissolution, it was part of the Nord-Audnedal prestegjeld and the Mandal prosti (deanery) in the Diocese of Agder.

Churches in Konsmo Municipality
Parish (sokn)	Church name	Location of the church	Year built
Konsmo	Konsmo Church	Konsmo	1802

== Geography ==
The highest point in the municipality was the 517-metre (1,696 ft) tall mountain Feiåsbergan, on the border with Hægebostad Municipality. Grindheim Municipality was located to the north, Bjelland Municipality was located to the northeast, Laudal Municipality was located to the east, Vigmostad Municipality was located to the south, Kvås Municipality was located to the southwest, and Hægebostad Municipality was located to the west.

== Government ==
While it existed, Konsmo Municipality was responsible for primary education (through 10th grade), outpatient health services, senior citizen services, welfare and other social services, zoning, economic development, and municipal roads and utilities. The municipality was governed by a municipal council of directly elected representatives. The mayor was indirectly elected by a vote of the municipal council. The municipality was under the jurisdiction of the Mandal District Court and the Agder Court of Appeal.

=== Municipal council ===
The municipal council (Herredsstyre) of Konsmo Municipality was made up of 13 representatives that were elected to four year terms. The tables below show the historical composition of the council by political party.

Konsmo herredsstyre 1959–1963
Party name (in Norwegian)	Number of representatives
Labour Party (Arbeiderpartiet)	6
Centre Party (Senterpartiet)	5
Liberal Party (Venstre)	2
Total number of members:	13
Note: On 1 January 1964, Konsmo Municipality became part of Audnedal Municipality.

Konsmo herredsstyre 1955–1959
Party name (in Norwegian)	Number of representatives
Labour Party (Arbeiderpartiet)	6
Joint List(s) of Non-Socialist Parties (Borgerlige Felleslister)	7
Total number of members:	13

Konsmo herredsstyre 1951–1955
Party name (in Norwegian)	Number of representatives
Labour Party (Arbeiderpartiet)	5
Joint List(s) of Non-Socialist Parties (Borgerlige Felleslister)	7
Total number of members:	12

Konsmo herredsstyre 1947–1951
Party name (in Norwegian)	Number of representatives
Labour Party (Arbeiderpartiet)	6
Joint List(s) of Non-Socialist Parties (Borgerlige Felleslister)	6
Total number of members:	12

Konsmo herredsstyre 1945–1947
Party name (in Norwegian)	Number of representatives
Labour Party (Arbeiderpartiet)	5
Communist Party (Kommunistiske Parti)	1
Farmers' Party (Bondepartiet)	5
Joint list of the Liberal Party (Venstre) and the Radical People's Party (Radikale Folkepartiet)	1
Total number of members:	12

Konsmo herredsstyre 1937–1941*
Party name (in Norwegian)	Number of representatives
Labour Party (Arbeiderpartiet)	4
List of workers, fishermen, and small farmholders (Arbeidere, fiskere, småbrukere liste)	1
Joint List(s) of Non-Socialist Parties (Borgerlige Felleslister)	7
Total number of members:	12
Note: Due to the German occupation of Norway during World War II, no elections were held for new municipal councils until after the war ended in 1945.

=== Mayors ===
The mayor (Norwegian: ordfører) of Konsmo Municipality was the political leader of the municipality and the chairperson of the municipal council. The following people have held this position:

- 1911–1916: Ånen Olsen Vivlemo
- 1917–1922: T.A. Øidne
- 1923–1931: Ånen Valand
- 1932–1937: T.A. Øidne
- 1938–1945: John K. Gislefos
- 1946–1947: C.G. Påhlmann
- 1948–1951: Bergtor Strisland
- 1952–1955: John K. Gislefos
- 1956–1959: Aanen B. Birkeland
- 1960–1963: John K. Gislefos

== See also ==
- List of former municipalities of Norway
