= Bjelland Municipality =

Former municipality in Vest-Agder, Norway

Bjelland Municipality Bjelland herad
- Former municipality
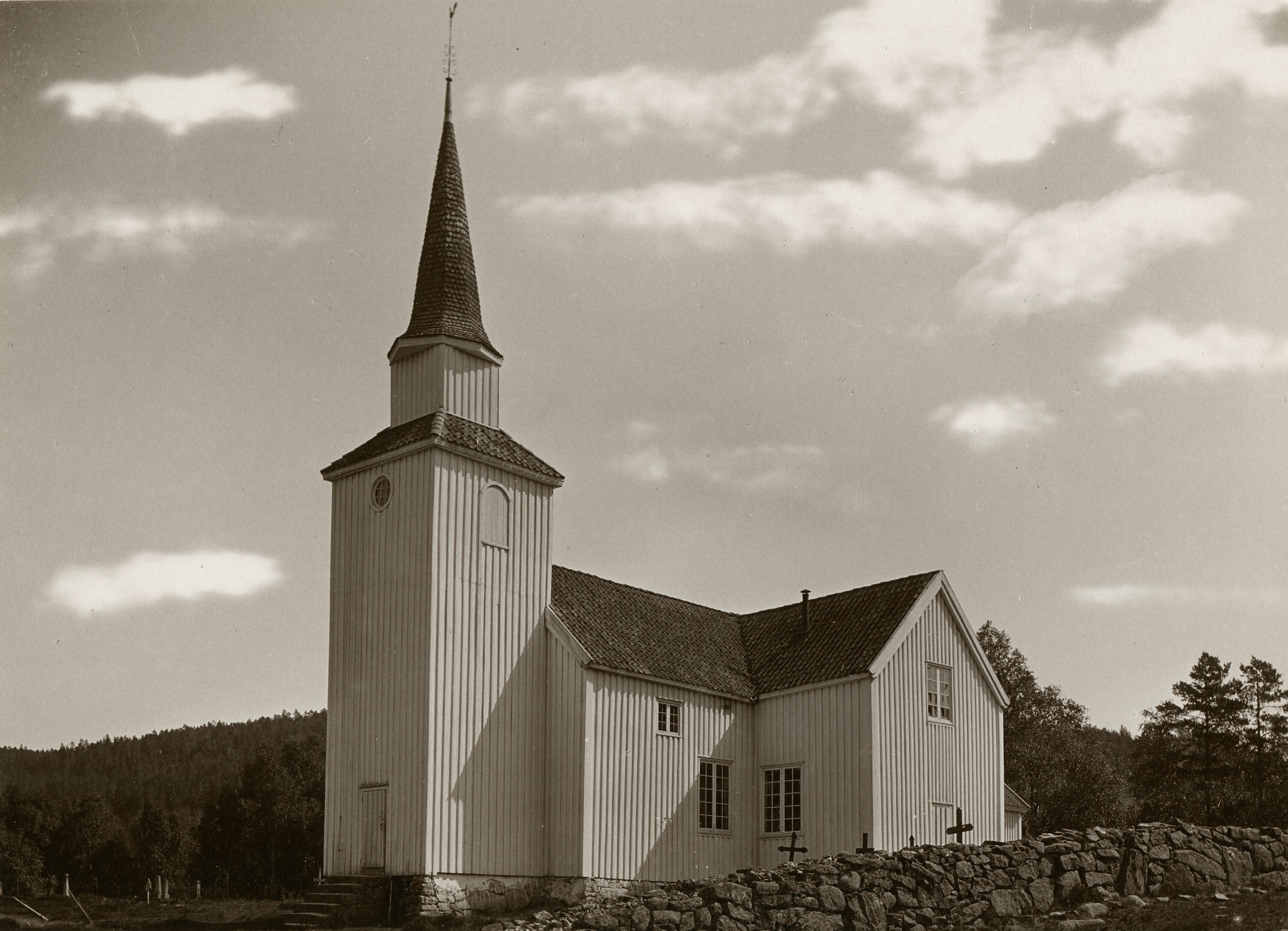
- View of the local Bjelland Church

- Vest-Agder within Norway

- Bjelland within Vest-Agder
- Coordinates: 58°22′48″N 07°31′40″E
- Country: Norway
- County: Vest-Agder
- District: Sørlandet
- Established: 1 Jan 1902
  - Preceded by: Bjelland og Grindum Municipality
- Disestablished: 1 Jan 1964
  - Succeeded by: Marnardal Municipality
- Administrative centre: Bjelland

Government
  - Mayor (1960–1963): Ånund Haugland

Area (upon dissolution)
  - Total: 163.9 km^{2} (63.3 sq mi)
  - Rank: #419 in Norway
- Highest elevation: 511.78 m (1,679.1 ft)

Population (1963)
  - Total: 640
  - Rank: #664 in Norway
  - Density: 3.9/km^{2} (10/sq mi)
  - Change (10 years): ▼ −12.1%
- Demonym: Bjelldøl

Official language
  - Norwegian form: Nynorsk
- Time zone: UTC+01:00 (CET)
  - Summer (DST): UTC+02:00 (CEST)
- ISO 3166 code: NO-1024

Bjelland is a former municipality in the old Vest-Agder county, Norway. The 163.9-square-kilometre (63.3 sq mi) municipality existed from 1902 until its dissolution in 1964. The area is now part of Lindesnes Municipality in Agder county. The administrative centre was the village of Bjelland where Bjelland Church is located.

Prior to its dissolution in 1964, the 163.9-square-kilometre (63.3 sq mi) municipality was the 419th largest by area out of the 689 municipalities in Norway. Bjelland Municipality was the 664th most populous municipality in Norway with a population of about 660. The municipality's population density was 3.9 inhabitants per square kilometre (10/sq mi) and its population had decreased by 12.1% over the previous 10-year period.

== General information ==
The municipality of Bjelland was established on 1 January 1902 when the old Bjelland og Grindum Municipality was divided into two: the eastern district (population: 907) became the new Bjelland Municipality and the western district (population: 909) became the new Grindheim Municipality.

During the 1960s, there were many municipal mergers across Norway due to the work of the Schei Committee. On 1 January 1964, Bjelland Municipality was dissolved and its lands were split up between the newly-created Marnardal Municipality and Audnedal Municipality.

The following areas were merged to form the new Marnardal Municipality:

- most of Bjelland Municipality (population: 535)
- all of Laudal Municipality (population: 560)
- most of Øyslebø Municipality (population: 1,068), except for the Brunvatne area which became part of Søgne Municipality
- the small Kleveland Bru area of Finsland Municipality (population: 40), with the rest of Finsland becoming part of the new Songdalen Municipality

The following areas were merged to form the new Audnedal Municipality:

- the Ågedal and Midtbø area of Bjelland Municipality (population: 96)
- all of Grindheim Municipality (population: 701)
- all of Konsmo Municipality (population: 712)

=== Name ===
The municipality (originally the parish) is named after the old Bjelland farm (Old Norse: Bjárland) since the first Bjelland Church was built there. The first element is the genitive case of the word bœr which means "farm" or "farmstead". The last element is land which means "land" or "district".

=== Churches ===
The Church of Norway had one parish (sokn) within Bjelland Municipality. At the time of the municipal dissolution, it was part of the Bjelland prestegjeld and the Mandal prosti (deanery) in the Diocese of Agder.

Churches in Bjelland Municipality
| Parish (sokn) | Church name | Location of the church | Year built |
|---|---|---|---|
| Bjelland | Bjelland Church | Bjelland | 1793 |

== Geography ==
The municipality was located in the upper Mandalen valley, along the border with Aust-Agder county. The highest point in the municipality was the 511.78-metre (1,679.1 ft) tall mountain Ørteknappknuten. Hornnes Municipality (in Aust-Agder county) was located to the north, Hægeland Municipality was located to the east, Finsland Municipality was located to the southeast, Laudal Municipality was located to the south, Konsmo Municipality was located to the southwest, and Grindheim Municipality was located to the west.

== Government ==
While it existed, Bjelland Municipality was responsible for primary education (through 10th grade), outpatient health services, senior citizen services, welfare and other social services, zoning, economic development, and municipal roads and utilities. The municipality was governed by a municipal council of directly elected representatives. The mayor was indirectly elected by a vote of the municipal council. The municipality was under the jurisdiction of the Mandal District Court and the Agder Court of Appeal.

=== Municipal council ===
The municipal council (Heradsstyre) of Bjelland Municipality was made up of representatives that were elected to four year terms. The tables below show the historical composition of the council by political party.

Bjelland heradsstyre 1959–1963
| Party name (in Nynorsk) | Number of representatives |
|---|---|
| Labour Party (Arbeidarpartiet) | 2 |
| Centre Party (Senterpartiet) | 7 |
| Liberal Party (Venstre) | 4 |
| Total number of members: | 13 |
Note: On 1 January 1964, Bjelland Municipality was divided between Audnedal Municipality and Marnardal Municipality.

Bjelland heradsstyre 1955–1959
| Party name (in Nynorsk) | Number of representatives |
|---|---|
| Labour Party (Arbeidarpartiet) | 2 |
| Farmers' Party (Bondepartiet) | 7 |
| Liberal Party (Venstre) | 4 |
| Total number of members: | 13 |

Bjelland heradsstyre 1951–1955
| Party name (in Nynorsk) | Number of representatives |
|---|---|
| Labour Party (Arbeidarpartiet) | 2 |
| Farmers' Party (Bondepartiet) | 5 |
| Liberal Party (Venstre) | 5 |
| Total number of members: | 12 |

Bjelland heradsstyre 1947–1951
| Party name (in Nynorsk) | Number of representatives |
|---|---|
| Labour Party (Arbeidarpartiet) | 2 |
| Farmers' Party (Bondepartiet) | 6 |
| Liberal Party (Venstre) | 4 |
| Total number of members: | 12 |

Bjelland heradsstyre 1945–1947
| Party name (in Nynorsk) | Number of representatives |
|---|---|
| Labour Party (Arbeidarpartiet) | 3 |
| Farmers' Party (Bondepartiet) | 5 |
| Liberal Party (Venstre) | 4 |
| Total number of members: | 12 |

Bjelland heradsstyre 1937–1941*
| Party name (in Nynorsk) | Number of representatives |
|---|---|
| Labour Party (Arbeidarpartiet) | 2 |
| Farmers' Party (Bondepartiet) | 6 |
| Liberal Party (Venstre) | 4 |
| Total number of members: | 12 |
Note: Due to the German occupation of Norway during World War II, no elections were held for new municipal councils until after the war ended in 1945.

=== Mayors ===
The mayor (Nynorsk: ordførar) of Bjelland Municipality was the political leader of the municipality and the chairperson of the municipal council. The following people have held this position:

- 1902–1929: O.K. Foss
- 1929–1931: Knut Homme
- 1932–1937: Andreas Haugland
- 1938–1942: Lars Tjelland
- 1942–1945: Sigurd Foss (NS)
- 1945–1945: Lars Tjelland
- 1946–1947: Kjetil Foss
- 1948–1951: Lars Skjeggestad
- 1952–1959: Torgeir Hjelmestad
- 1960–1963: Ånund Haugland

== See also ==
- List of former municipalities of Norway
