= Bjelland Point =

Bjelland Point (54°6′S 36°44′W) is a headland on the north coast of South Georgia, immediately south of Second Milestone and 1.5 nautical miles (3 km) east-northeast of Robertson Point. It was surveyed by the South Georgia Survey in the period 1951–57, and named by the UK Antarctic Place-Names Committee for Sigurd L. Bjelland, Manager of the South Georgia Whaling Co station at Leith Harbor for several years beginning in 1951.
