= Ytre Øydnavatnet =

Lake in Agder, Norway

- Ytre Øydnevann
- Interactive map of Ytre Øydnavatnet
- Location: Lyngdal Municipality, Agder
- Coordinates: 58.3553°N 7.37318°E
- Primary inflows: Øvre Øydnavatnet lake
- Primary outflows: Audna river
- Basin countries: Norway
- Max. length: 5.7 kilometres (3.5 mi)
- Max. width: 1 kilometre (0.62 mi)
- Surface area: 3.22 km^{2} (1.24 sq mi)
- Shore length^{1}: 17.5 kilometres (10.9 mi)
- Surface elevation: 96 metres (315 ft)
- References: NVE
- ^{1} Shore length is not a well-defined measure.

Ytre Øydnavatnet is a lake in Lyngdal Municipality in Agder county, Norway. The 3.22-square-kilometre (1.24 sq mi) lake is located along the river Audna, just south of the lake Øvre Øydnavatnet. The lake sits at an elevation of 96 metres (315 ft) above sea level. The 17.5-kilometre (10.9 mi) long lake lies about 5.5 kilometres (3.4 mi) south of the village of Byremo and about 3.6 kilometres (2.2 mi) north of the village of Konsmo.

== See also ==
- List of lakes in Norway
