= Grindheim Municipality =

Former municipality in Vest-Agder, Norway

Grindheim Municipality Grindheim herad
- Former municipality
- Grindum herred (historic name)
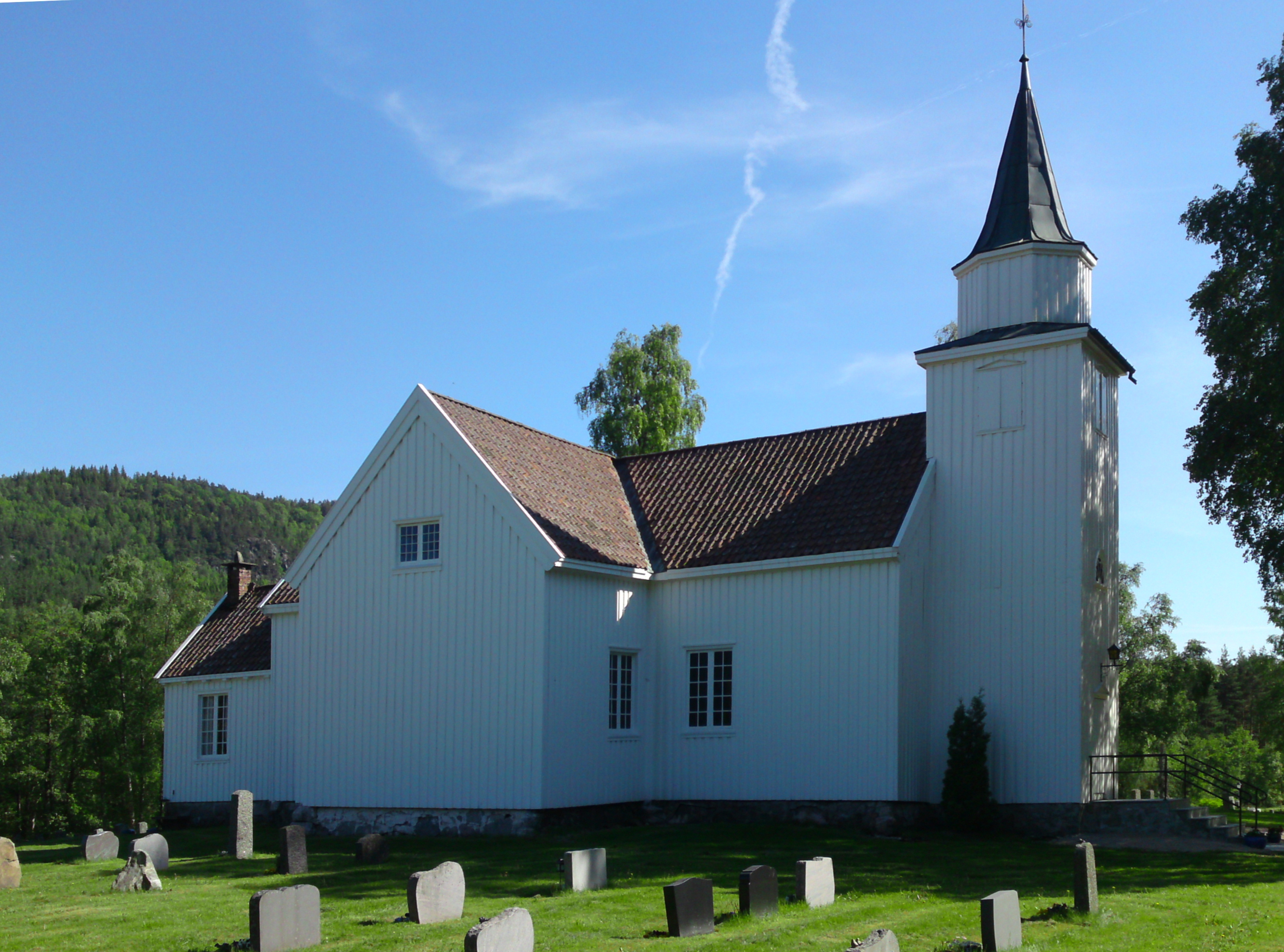
- View of the municipal church

- Vest-Agder within Norway

- Grindheim within Vest-Agder
- Coordinates: 58°26′24″N 07°25′02″E
- Country: Norway
- County: Vest-Agder
- District: Sørlandet
- Established: 1 Jan 1902
  - Preceded by: Bjelland og Grindum Municipality
- Disestablished: 1 Jan 1964
  - Succeeded by: Audnedal Municipality
- Administrative centre: Byremo

Government
  - Mayor (1956–1963): Nils Øydna

Area (upon dissolution)
  - Total: 130.2 km^{2} (50.3 sq mi)
  - Rank: #463 in Norway
- Highest elevation: 578.1 m (1,897 ft)

Population (1963)
  - Total: 717
  - Rank: #654 in Norway
  - Density: 5.5/km^{2} (14/sq mi)
  - Change (10 years): ▲ +2.3%
- Demonym: Grinddøl

Official language
  - Norwegian form: Nynorsk
- Time zone: UTC+01:00 (CET)
  - Summer (DST): UTC+02:00 (CEST)
- ISO 3166 code: NO-1025

Grindheim is a former municipality in the old Vest-Agder county, Norway. The 130.2-square-kilometre (50.3 sq mi) municipality existed from 1902 until its dissolution in 1964. The area is now part of Lyngdal Municipality in the traditional district of Lister in Agder county. The administrative centre was the village of Byremo where Grindheim Church is located.

Prior to its dissolution in 1963, the 130.2-square-kilometre (50.3 sq mi) municipality was the 463th largest by area out of the 689 municipalities in Norway. Grindheim Municipality was the 654th most populous municipality in Norway with a population of about 717. The municipality's population density was 5.5 inhabitants per square kilometre (14/sq mi) and its population had increased by 2.3% over the previous 10-year period.

== General information ==
The municipality of Grindum (later spelled Grindheim) was established on 1 January 1902 when the old Bjelland og Grindum Municipality was divided into two separate municipalities: the western district (population: 909) became Grindum Municipality and the eastern district (population: 907) became Bjelland Municipality.

During the 1960s, there were many municipal mergers across Norway due to the work of the Schei Committee. On 1 January 1964, Grindheim Municipality was dissolved and the following areas were merged to form the new Audnedal Municipality:

- all of Grindheim Municipality (population: 701)
- all of Konsmo Municipality (population: 712)
- the Ågedal and Midtbø areas of Bjelland Municipality (population: 96)

=== Name ===
The municipality (originally the parish) is named after the old Grindem farm (Old Norse: Grindeimr) since the first Grindheim Church was built there. The first element is grind which means "gate" or "fence". The last element is heimr which means "home" or "abode".

Historically, the name of the municipality was spelled Grindem. In 1889, the spelling was changed to Grindum. On 3 November 1917, a royal resolution changed the spelling of the name of the municipality to Grindheim.

=== Churches ===
The Church of Norway had one parish (sokn) within Grindheim Municipality. At the time of the municipal dissolution, it was part of the Bjelland prestegjeld and the Mandal prosti (deanery) in the Diocese of Agder.

Churches in Grindheim Municipality
Parish (sokn)	Church name	Location of the church	Year built
Grindheim	Grindheim Church	Byremo	1783

== Geography ==
The highest point in the municipality was the 578.1-metre (1,897 ft) tall mountain Ørnemyrfjellet. Åseral Municipality was located to the north, Hornnes Municipality was located to the northeast, Bjelland Municipality was located to the east, Konsmo Municipality was located to the south, Hægebostad Municipality was located to the southwest, and Eiken Municipality was located to the west.

== Government ==
While it existed, Grindheim Municipality was responsible for primary education (through 10th grade), outpatient health services, senior citizen services, welfare and other social services, zoning, economic development, and municipal roads and utilities. The municipality was governed by a municipal council of directly elected representatives. The mayor was indirectly elected by a vote of the municipal council. The municipality was under the jurisdiction of the Mandal District Court and the Agder Court of Appeal.

=== Municipal council ===
The municipal council (Heradsstyre) of Grindheim Municipality was made up of 13 representatives that were elected to four year terms. The tables below show the historical composition of the council by political party.

Grindheim heradsstyre 1959–1963
Party name (in Nynorsk)	Number of representatives
Labour Party (Arbeidarpartiet)	3
Christian Democratic Party (Kristeleg Folkeparti)	2
Centre Party (Senterpartiet)	5
Liberal Party (Venstre)	3
Total number of members:	13
Note: On 1 January 1964, Grindheim Municipality became part of Audnedal Municipality.

Grindheim heradsstyre 1955–1959
Party name (in Nynorsk)	Number of representatives
Labour Party (Arbeidarpartiet)	3
Christian Democratic Party (Kristeleg Folkeparti)	2
Joint List(s) of Non-Socialist Parties (Borgarlege Felleslister)	8
Total number of members:	13

Grindheim heradsstyre 1951–1955
Party name (in Nynorsk)	Number of representatives
Labour Party (Arbeidarpartiet)	3
Christian Democratic Party (Kristeleg Folkeparti)	2
Joint List(s) of Non-Socialist Parties (Borgarlege Felleslister)	7
Total number of members:	12

Grindheim heradsstyre 1947–1951
Party name (in Nynorsk)	Number of representatives
Labour Party (Arbeidarpartiet)	3
Christian Democratic Party (Kristeleg Folkeparti)	3
Joint List(s) of Non-Socialist Parties (Borgarlege Felleslister)	6
Total number of members:	12

Grindheim heradsstyre 1945–1947
Party name (in Nynorsk)	Number of representatives
Labour Party (Arbeidarpartiet)	4
Joint List(s) of Non-Socialist Parties (Borgarlege Felleslister)	8
Total number of members:	12

Grindheim heradsstyre 1937–1941*
Party name (in Nynorsk)	Number of representatives
Labour Party (Arbeidarpartiet)	3
Local List(s) (Lokale lister)	9
Total number of members:	12
Note: Due to the German occupation of Norway during World War II, no elections were held for new municipal councils until after the war ended in 1945.

=== Mayors ===
The mayor (Nynorsk: ordførar) of Grindheim Municipality was the political leader of the municipality and the chairperson of the municipal council. The following people have held this position:

- 1902–1903: Søren Seland
- 1904–1913: Abreham Iversen
- 1914–1916: O. Butveit
- 1917–1919: G.S. Øydna
- 1920–1922: E. Refsnes
- 1923–1934: John Seland
- 1935–1937: John Ubostad
- 1938–1944: Søren Seland
- 1945–1945: Lars O. Hårtveit
- 1946–1947: Andrias Øydna
- 1948–1951: John Ubotad
- 1952–1955: Andrias Øydna
- 1956–1963: Nils Øydna

== See also ==
- List of former municipalities of Norway
