= Konsmo =

Village in Lyngdal Municipality, Norway

- Village
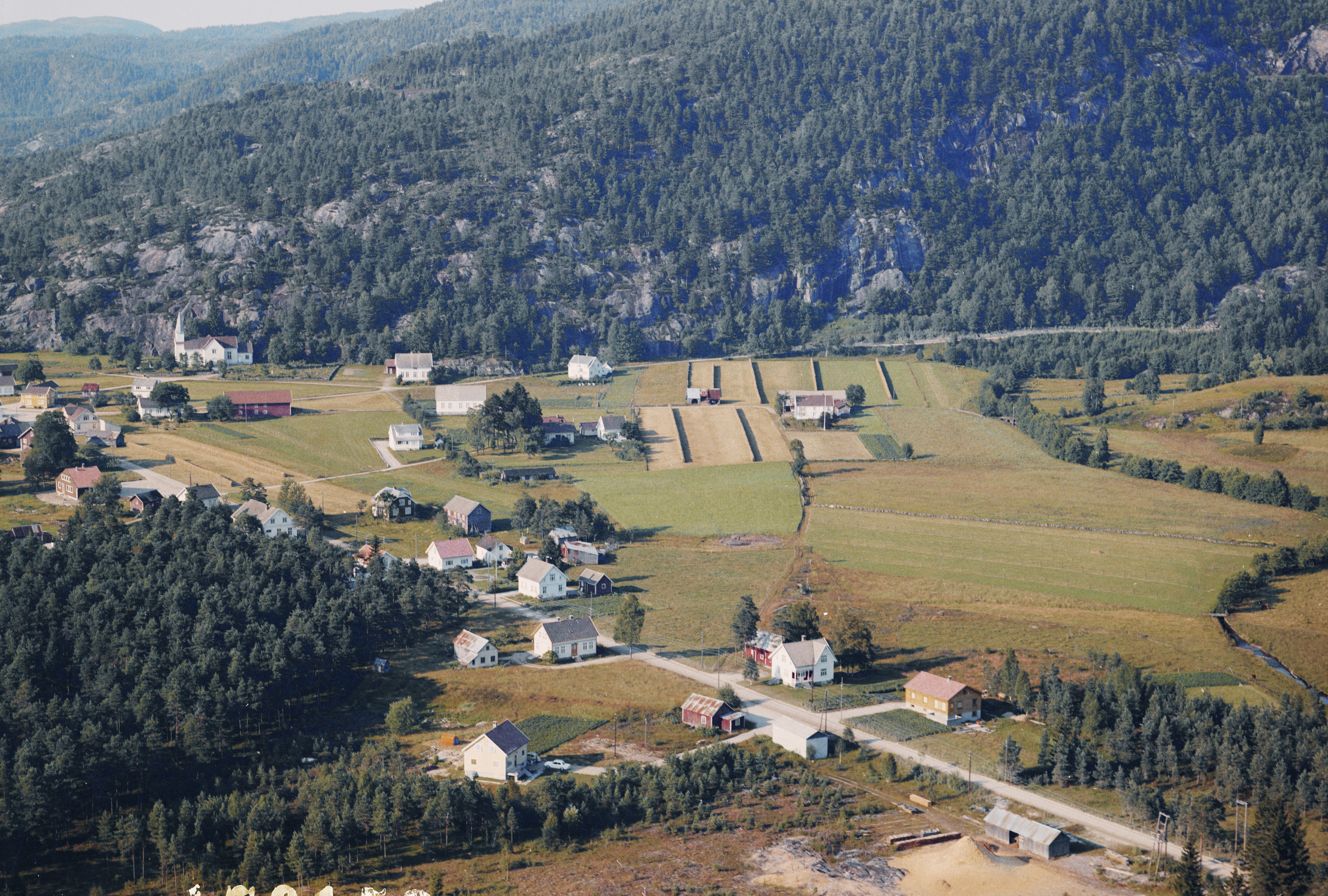
- View of the village (1966)
- Interactive map of Konsmo
- Coordinates: 58.28529°N 7.35601°E
- Country: Norway
- Region: Southern Norway
- County: Agder
- District: Lister
- Municipality: Lyngdal Municipality
- Elevation: 79 m (259 ft)
- Time zone: UTC+01:00 (CET)
  - Summer (DST): UTC+02:00 (CEST)
- Post Code: 4525 Konsmo

Konsmo is a village in Lyngdal Municipality in Agder county, Norway. The village is located south of the lake Ytre Øydnavatnet along the Audna river in the Audnedalen valley. Konsmo Church is located in the village. The small village of Helle is located just 1 kilometre (0.62 mi) north of Konsmo.

== History ==
The village was the administrative centre of the old Konsmo Municipality which existed from 1911 until 1964 and then it was the administrative centre of the Audnedal Municipality from 1964 until 2020 when that area became part of Lyngdal Municipality.

=== Name ===
The municipality (originally the parish) is named after the old Konsmo farm (Old Norse: Konungsmór), since the first Konsmo Church was built there. The name is a corruption of Kongsmoen which means King's moor.
