= Bjelland (surname) =

Bjelland is a surname that is derived from several farms in Norway. It consists of the Old Norse word bær and for a farm or farmstead and the word for land.

Notable people with the surname include:

- Anders Andersen Bjelland (1790–1850), a Norwegian politician
- Andreas Bjelland (born 1988), a Danish footballer
- Christian Bjelland (disambiguation), multiple people
- Kat Bjelland (born 1963), an American musician
- Sveinung Bjelland (born 1970), a Norwegian classical pianist

== See also ==
- Bjelland (disambiguation)
