= Christian Bjelland =

Christian Bjelland may refer to:

- Christian Bjelland I (1858–1927), Norwegian businessman
- Christian Bjelland IV (born 1954), Norwegian industrialist and art collector

== See also ==
- Bjelland (surname)
