= Snigsfjorden =

Fjord in Agder, Norway

- Sniksfjorden
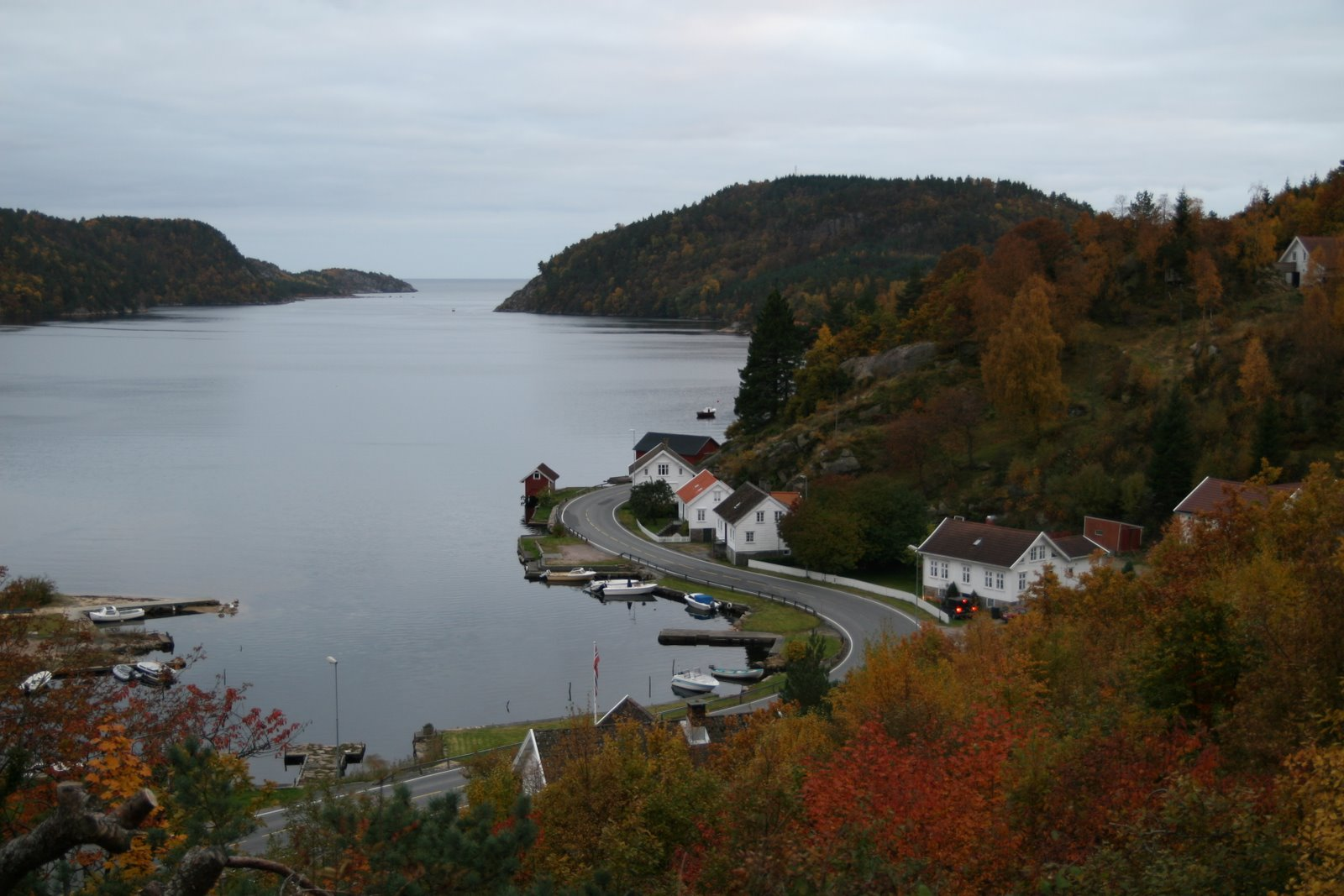
- View of the fjord
- Interactive map of the fjord
- Location: Agder county, Norway
- Coordinates: 58.03511°N 7.27413°E
- Type: Fjord
- Primary inflows: Audna river
- Primary outflows: North Sea
- Basin countries: Norway
- Max. length: 3 kilometres (1.9 mi)

Snigsfjorden is a fjord in Lindesnes Municipality in Agder county, Norway. The 3-kilometre (1.9 mi) long fjord begins at the mouth of the river Audna by the small village of Snig, about 4 kilometres (2.5 mi) south of the village of Vigeland. The fjord heads south to the North Sea. The east side of the fjord is the mainland of Norway and the west side of the fjord is bounded by the island of Unnerøy. The two small islets of Fløyholmen and Tolleknivane are located at the mouth of the fjord. The small Navarsundet strait runs between Unnerøy island and the mainland on the west side of the fjord, connecting it to the nearby Syrdalsfjorden.

== See also ==
- List of Norwegian fjords
