= Vigeland, Norway =

Village in Lindesnes Municipality, Norway

Vigeland
- Village
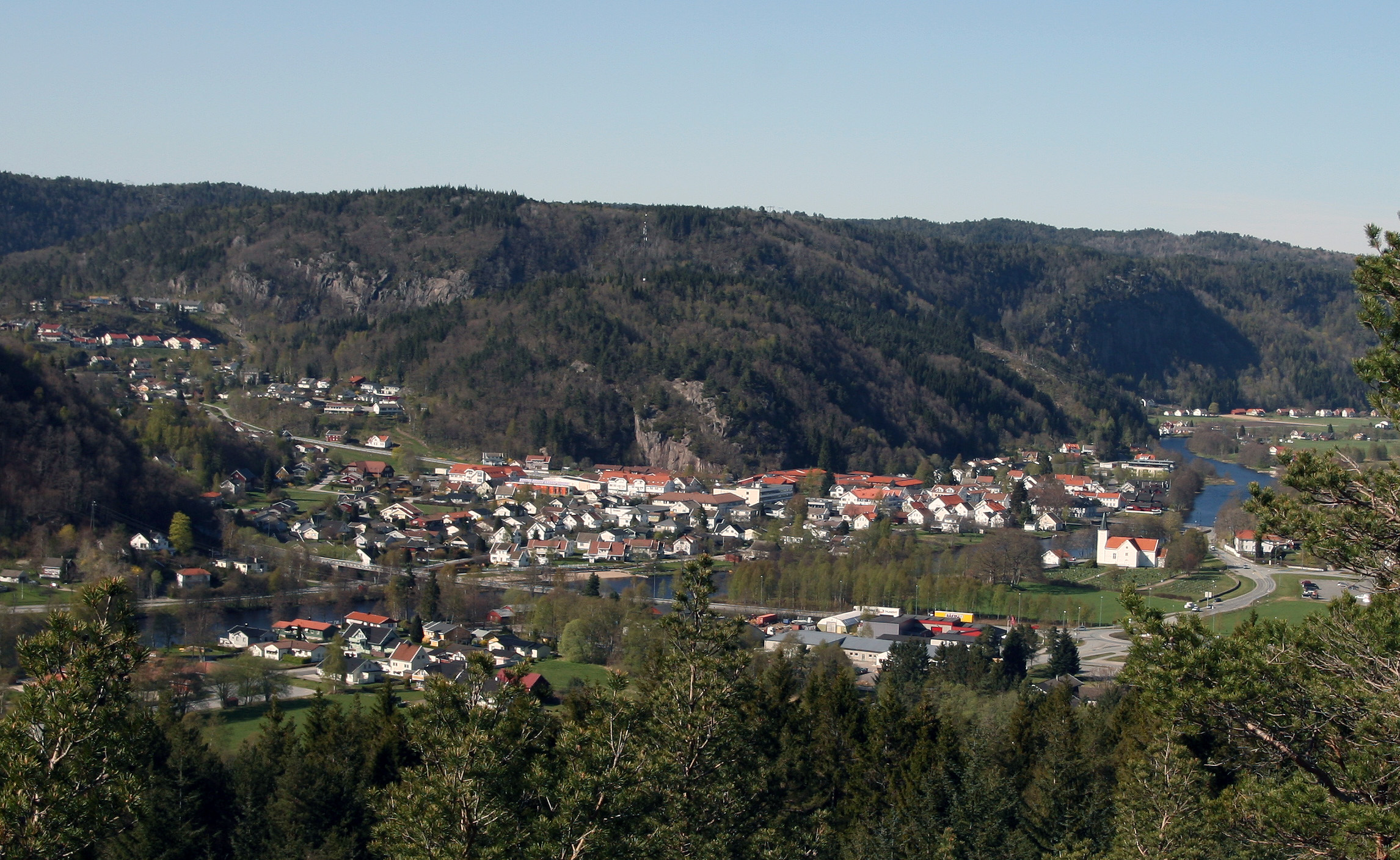
- View of the village seen from Kongsknipen by Herstøl
- Interactive map of Vigeland
- Coordinates: 58.08429°N 7.30509°E
- Country: Norway
- Region: Southern Norway
- County: Agder
- District: Lindesnes
- Municipality: Lindesnes Municipality

Area
  - Total: 1.14 km^{2} (0.44 sq mi)
- Elevation: 4 m (13 ft)

Population (2025)
  - Total: 1,708
  - Density: 1,498/km^{2} (3,880/sq mi)
- Time zone: UTC+01:00 (CET)
  - Summer (DST): UTC+02:00 (CEST)
- Post Code: 4523 Lindesnes

Vigeland is a village in Lindesnes Municipality in Agder county, Norway. The village is located along the river Audna, about 5 kilometres (3.1 mi) north of the river's mouth at the Snigsfjorden. The European route E39 highway runs east-west through Vigeland, connecting it to the town of Mandal, about 12 kilometres (7.5 mi) to the southeast. The 1.14-square-kilometre (280-acre) village has a population (2025) of 1,708 and a population density of 1,498 inhabitants per square kilometre (3,880/sq mi).

== History ==
Prior to 1 January 2020, the village was the administrative center of Lindesnes Municipality. After a municipal merger in 2020, the administrative centre was moved to the nearby town of Mandal.

=== Name ===
The village of Vigeland was named for the historic Vigeland farm which was located where the village is now. The farm was first documented in 1390 (Vikinggaland, meaning "Viking land"). The first element is the genitive case of the Old Norse personal name Víkingi meaning "land owned by (the man) Víkingi". The first element could also be the genitive plural case of the Old Norse word víkingr meaning "Viking" but the use of such a name would be a bit obscure.

== Valle Church ==
Valle Church is located on the east side of the Audna river at Vigeland. It is the church for the Valle parish. The church has a cruciform shape and was built in 1793. It was internally restored for its 200th anniversary in 1993. A statue created by Gustav Vigeland of Peder Claussøn Friis, who was once a priest in Lindesnes, stands outside the Valle Church rectory.

== Media gallery ==
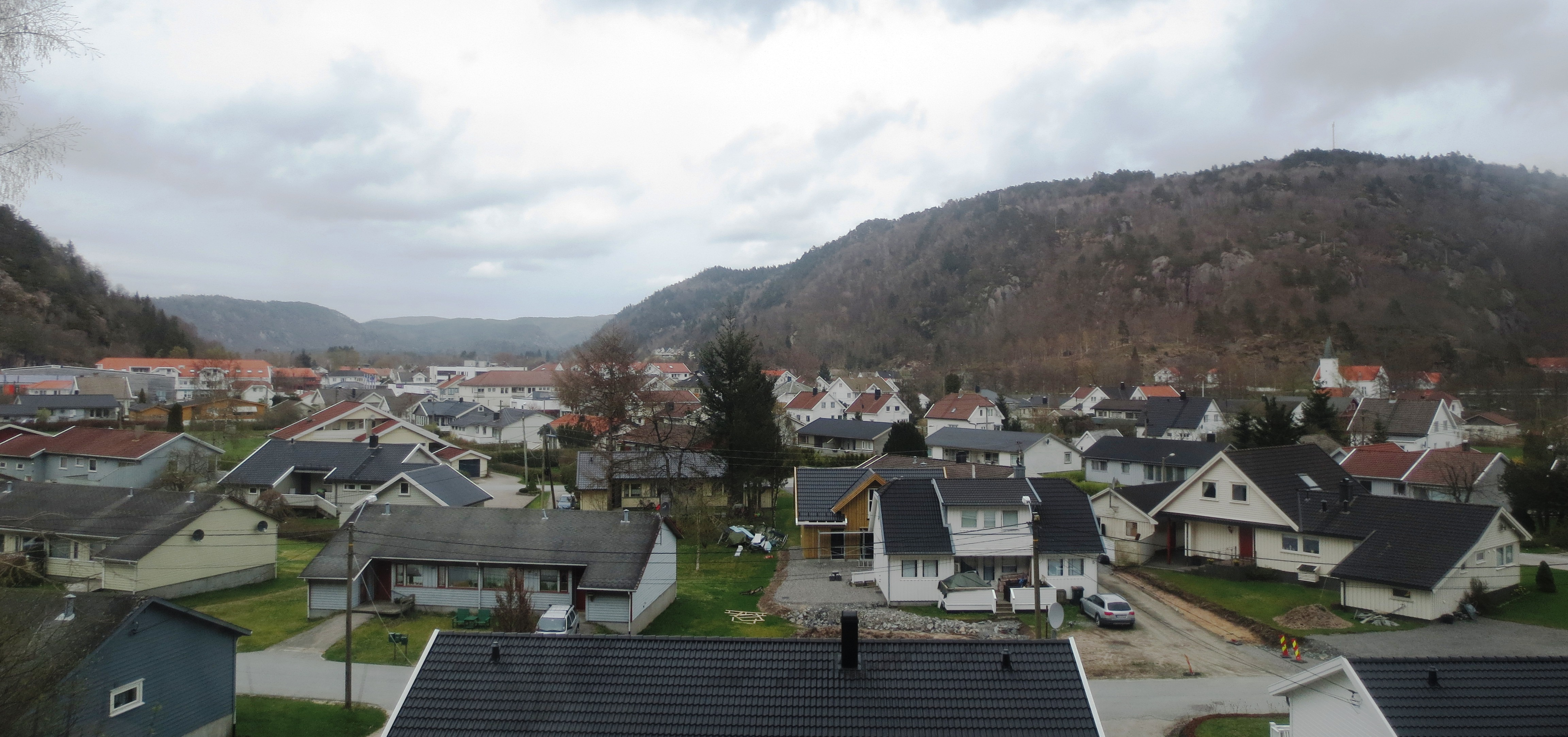
The village of Vigeland

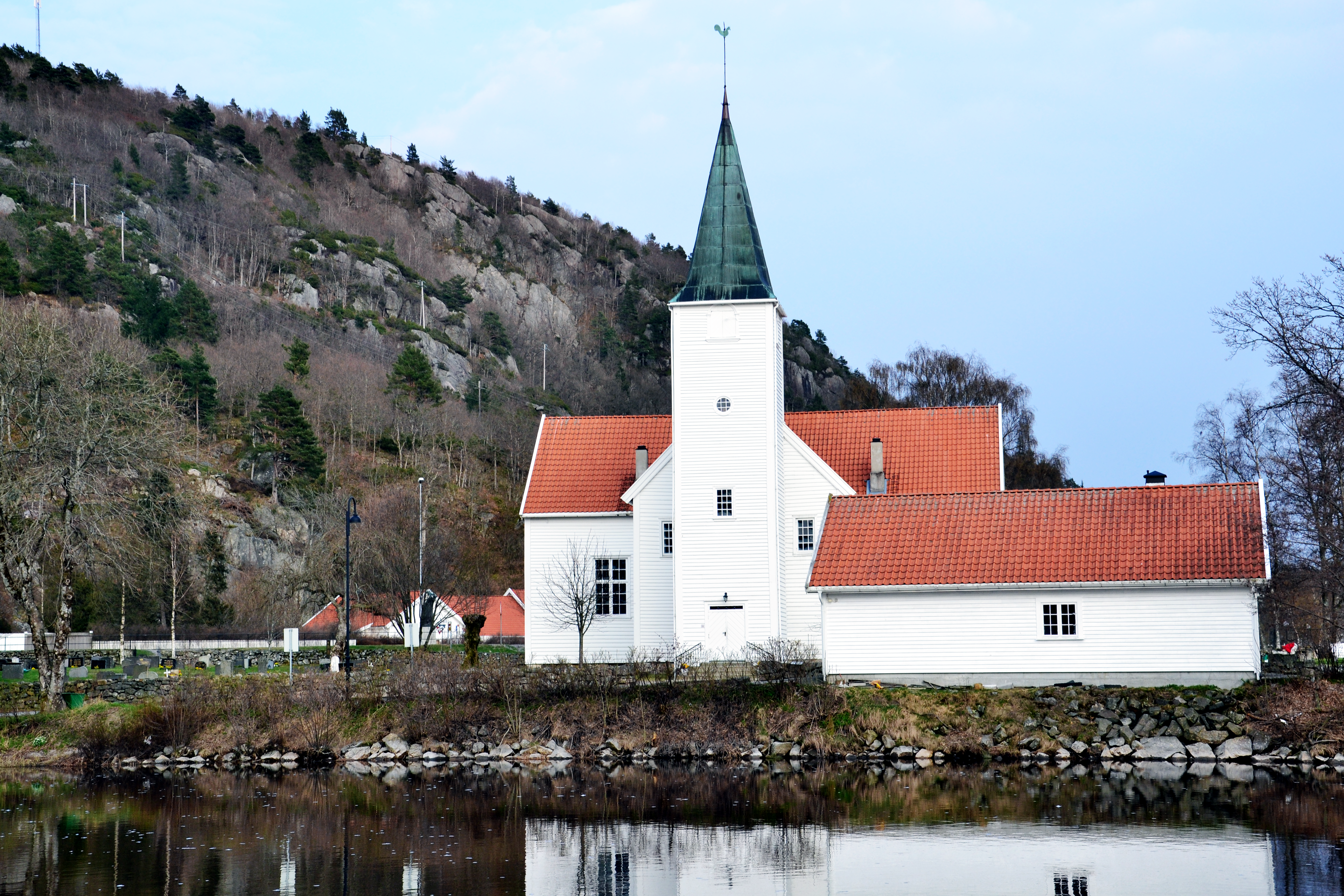
Valle Church at Vigeland

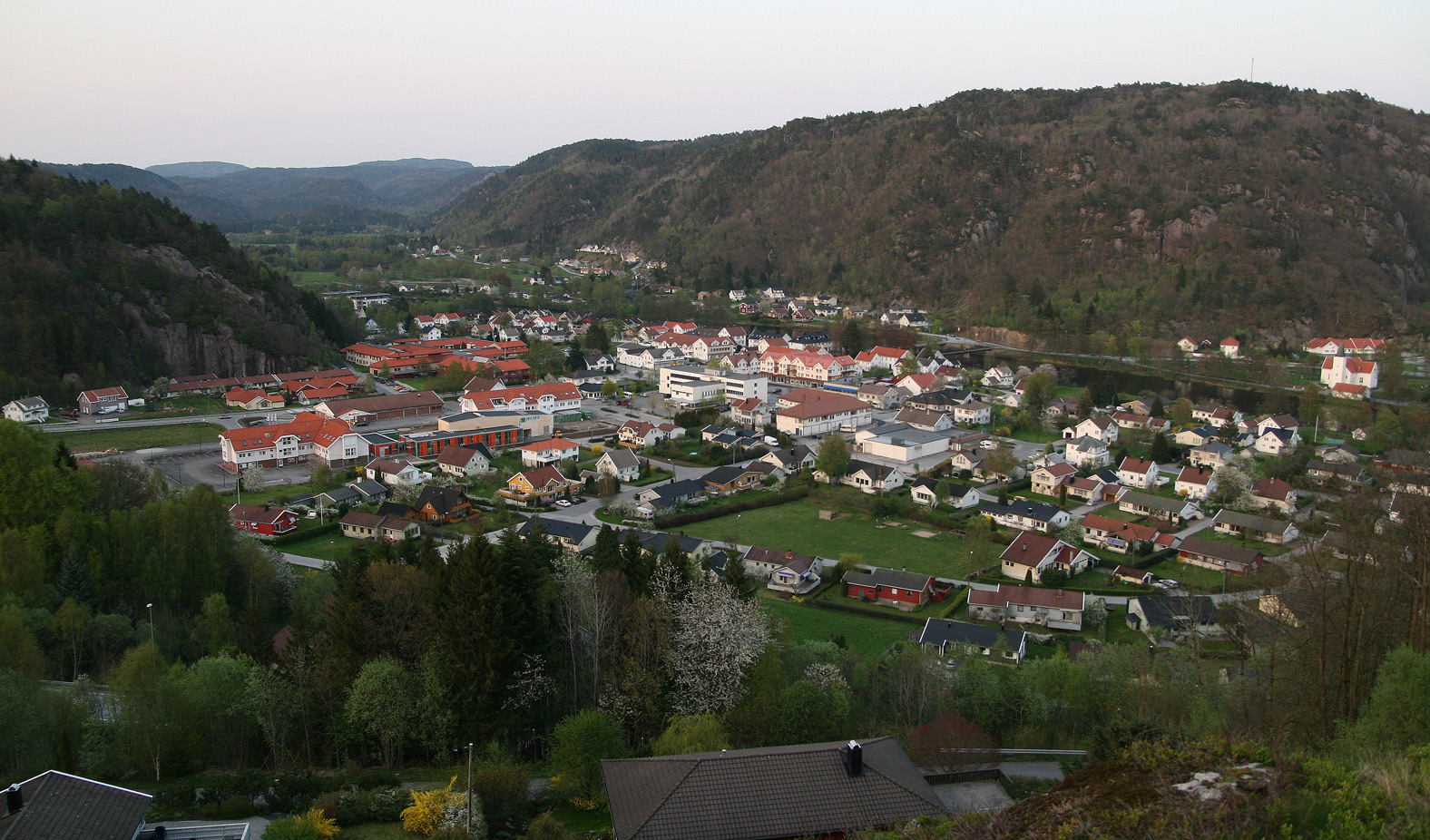
View of the village

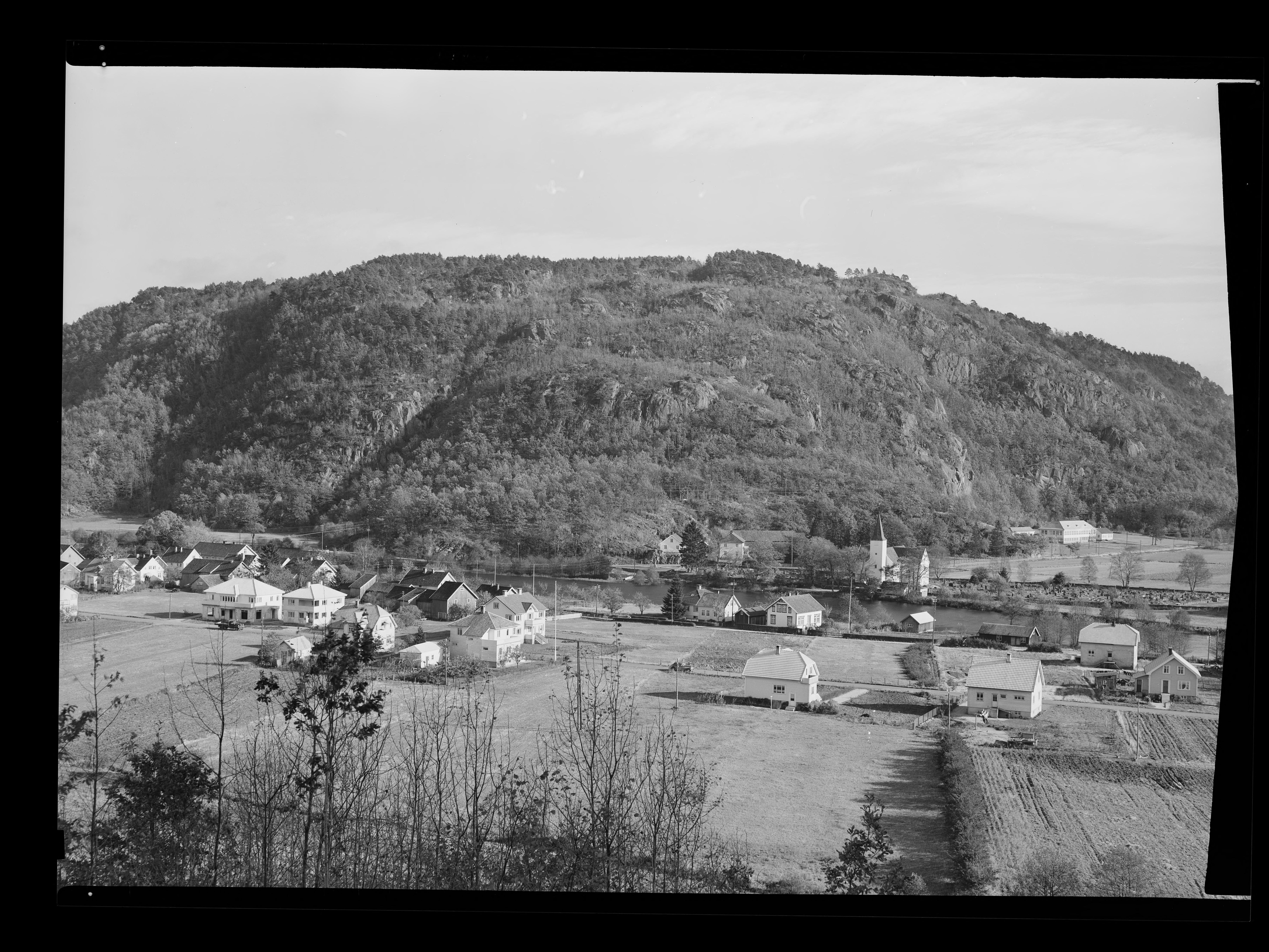
View of the village around 1950

== Notable people ==
The family of the artist Gustav Vigeland and his brother Emanuel both originally came from Vigeland. The brothers both lived for a time with their grandparents on a farm called Mjunebrokka in Vigeland. Both of Gustav Vigeland's parents were buried in the Valle Church cemetery.
