= Second Milestone =

Coordinates: 54°6′S 36°44′W

Second Milestone is a rock marked by breakers, 1.7 nautical miles (3.1 km) east-northeast of Robertson Point, off the north coast of South Georgia. Charted and named by DI personnel during the period 1927–30.
