= Audna =

River in Agder, Norway

Audna Audnedalselva
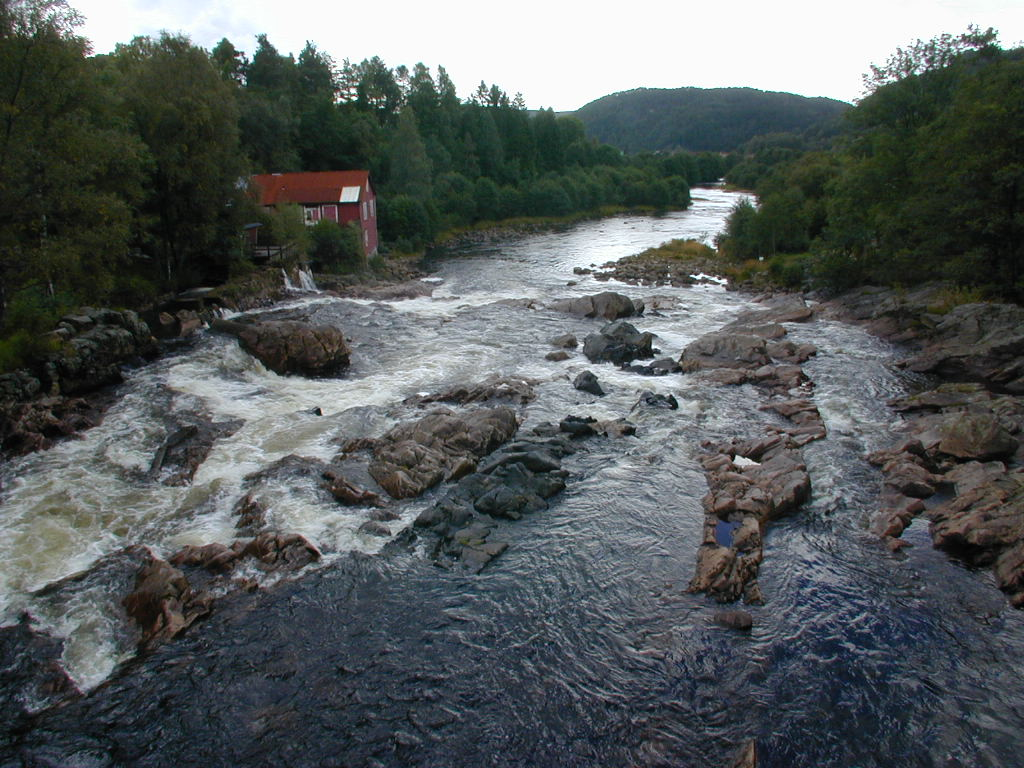
- View of the Melhusfossen waterfall on the river Audna

Location
- Country: Norway
- County: Agder
- Municipalities: Lindesnes Municipality, Lyngdal Municipality

Physical characteristics
- Source: Grindheimsvatnet lake
  - location: Lyngdal Municipality, Norway
  - coordinates: 58°26′50″N 07°25′26″E
  - elevation: 117 m (384 ft)
- Mouth: Snigsfjorden
  - location: Lindesnes Municipality, Norway
  - coordinates: 58°03′18″N 07°16′38″E
  - elevation: 0 m (0 ft)
- Length: 55 km (34 mi)
- Basin size: 438 km^{2} (169 sq mi)
- Discharge
  - average: 20 m^{3}/s (710 cu ft/s)
  - maximum: 183 m^{3}/s (6,500 cu ft/s)

Audna or Audnedalselva is a river in Agder county, Norway. The 55-kilometre (34 mi) long river runs from the lake Grindheimsvatnet, just north of the village of Byremo in Lyngdal Municipality, south through the Audnedalen valley to its mouth at the Snigsfjorden in Lindesnes Municipality. The mouth is located about 4 kilometres (2.5 mi) southwest of the village of Vigeland. The river has a drainage basin that covers 438 square kilometres (169 sq mi). The river runs through two lakes: Øvre Øydnavatnet and Ytre Øydnavatnet.

The river is regulated for hydroelectric power with a total of eight power plants along the river and its tributaries. Together, the river produces an average annual production (2015) of 48.5 gigawatt-hours (175 TJ) of electricity.

== See also ==
- List of rivers in Norway
