= Bjelland =

Village in Lindesnes Municipality, Norway

- Village
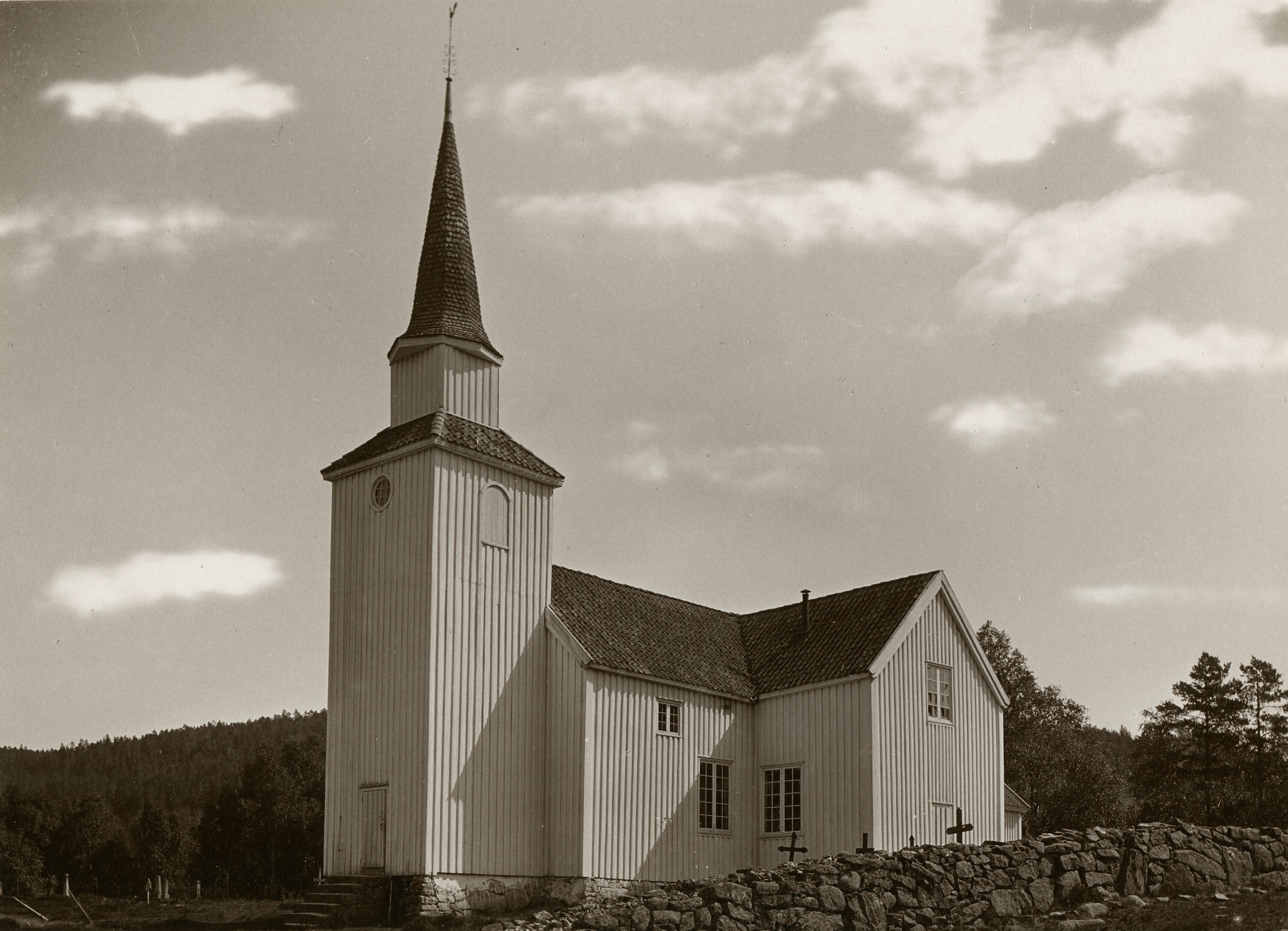
- View of the village church (c. 1900)
- Interactive map of Bjelland
- Coordinates: 58.38407°N 7.52767°E
- Country: Norway
- Region: Southern Norway
- County: Agder
- Municipality: Lindesnes Municipality
- Elevation: 89 m (292 ft)
- Time zone: UTC+01:00 (CET)
  - Summer (DST): UTC+02:00 (CEST)
- Post Code: 4536 Bjelland

Bjelland is a village in Lindesnes Municipality in Agder county, Norway. The village is located along the river Mandalselva, about 10 kilometres (6.2 mi) southeast of the village of Byremo (in Lyngdal Municipality) and about 14 kilometres (8.7 mi) west of the village of Hægeland (in Vennesla Municipality). The village is the site of Bjelland Church.

== History ==
The village was the administrative centre of the old Bjelland Municipality which existed from 1902 until 1964.

== Notable people ==
Notable people that were born or lived in Bjelland include:

- Beate Asserson (1913–2000), an opera singer
- Ole Høiland (1797–1848),a well-known burglar and jail-breaker
- Thore Torkildsen Foss (1841–1913), a Norwegian politician
