= Konsmo Church =

Church in Agder, Norway

- Konsmo kirke
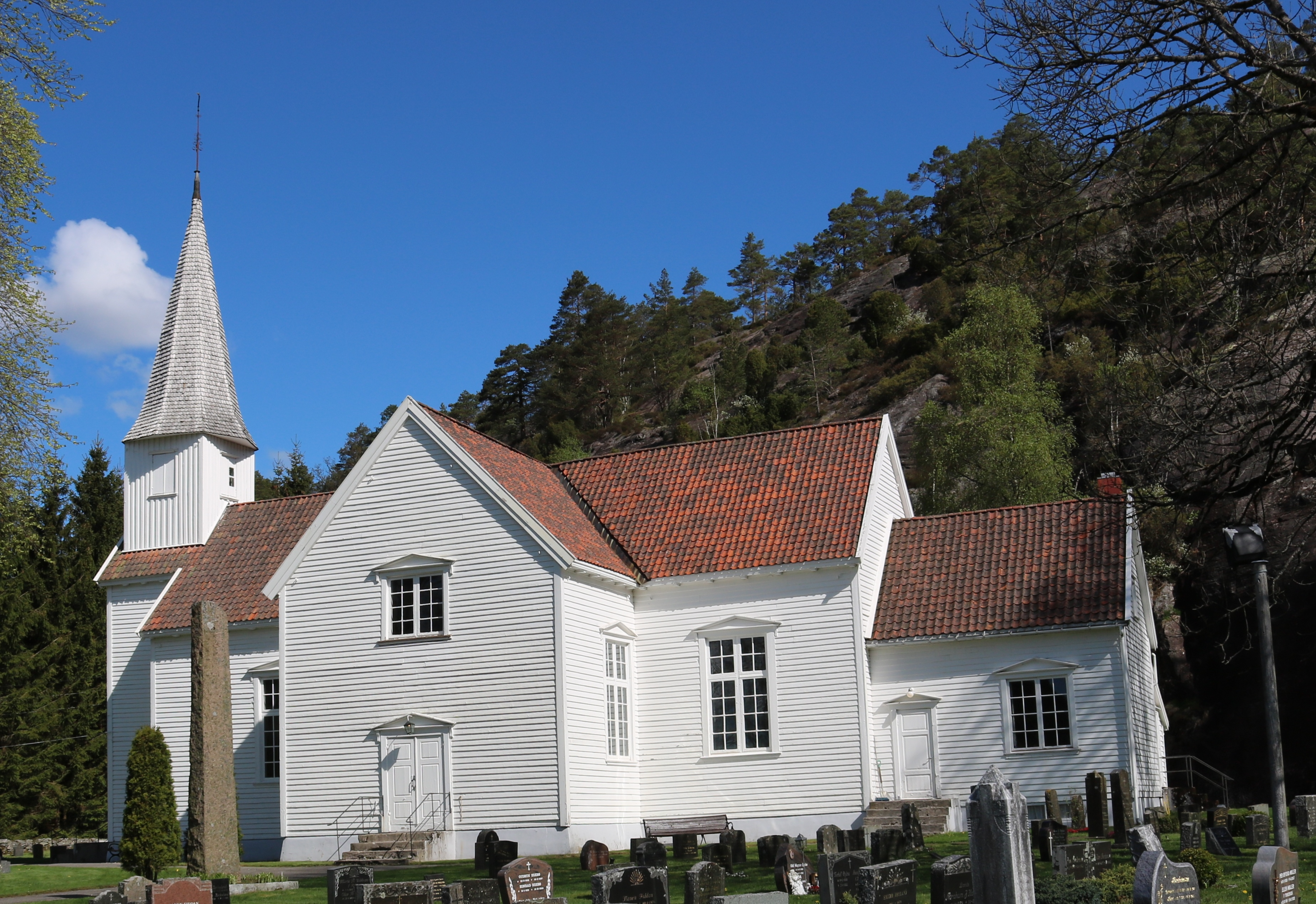
- View of the church
- Konsmo Church
- 58.2863°N 07.3579°E
- Location: Lyngdal Municipality, Agder
- Country: Norway
- Denomination: Church of Norway
- Churchmanship: Evangelical Lutheran

History
- Status: Parish church
- Founded: 13th-century
- Consecrated: 1802

Architecture
- Functional status: Active
- Architect: Arne Listad
- Architectural type: Cruciform
- Completed: 1802; 224 years ago

Specifications
- Capacity: 400
- Materials: Wood

Administration
- Diocese: Agder og Telemark
- Deanery: Lister og Mandal prosti
- Parish: Konsmo
- Norwegian Cultural Heritage Site
- Type: Church
- Status: Automatically protected
- ID: 84816

Konsmo Church (Norwegian: Konsmo kirke) is a parish church of the Church of Norway in Lyngdal Municipality in Agder county, Norway. It is located in the village of Konsmo. It is the church for the Konsmo parish which is part of the Lister og Mandal prosti (deanery) in the Diocese of Agder og Telemark. The white, wooden church was built in a cruciform design in 1802 using plans drawn up by the architect Arne Bjørnson Listad. The church seats about 400 people.

== History ==
The earliest existing historical records of the church date back to the year 1335, but it was not new that year. The medieval church was torn down and replaced with a new building in the mid- to late-1500s. This church was built in a long church design with a short tower on top. Some records show that the church may have been remodeled or expanded in the 1730s. The old church was described as being old and in poor condition and constantly in need of repair. So, in 1802, the older church was torn down and replaced with a new building on the same site. As the old church was torn down, many of the best materials from the previous church were saved and later reused in the construction of the new cruciform church.

In 1814, this church served as an election church (Norwegian: valgkirke). Together with more than 300 other parish churches across Norway, it was a polling station for elections to the 1814 Norwegian Constituent Assembly which wrote the Constitution of Norway. This was Norway's first national elections. Each church parish was a constituency that elected people called "electors" who later met together in each county to elect the representatives for the assembly that was to meet at Eidsvoll Manor later that year.

In 1870, several changes were made inside the church including new and larger windows that were installed, making the church room brighter. Also, the old doors on the pews were removed. In 1947, the roof and tower were repaired. In 1950, the church was wired for electricity and lights were added, for a total cost of 3,000 kr. In 1952, a comprehensive renovation of the bell tower, staircase, and attic was undertaken. In 1954, a sacristy was built on to the church. In 1964, electric heating was added to the church. The old wood stoves are still present in the church, but they are only decorative now. In 1981, the sacristy was enlarged and a bathroom was added.

== See also ==
- List of churches in Agder og Telemark
