= Bjelland Church =

Church in Agder, Norway

- Bjelland kyrkje
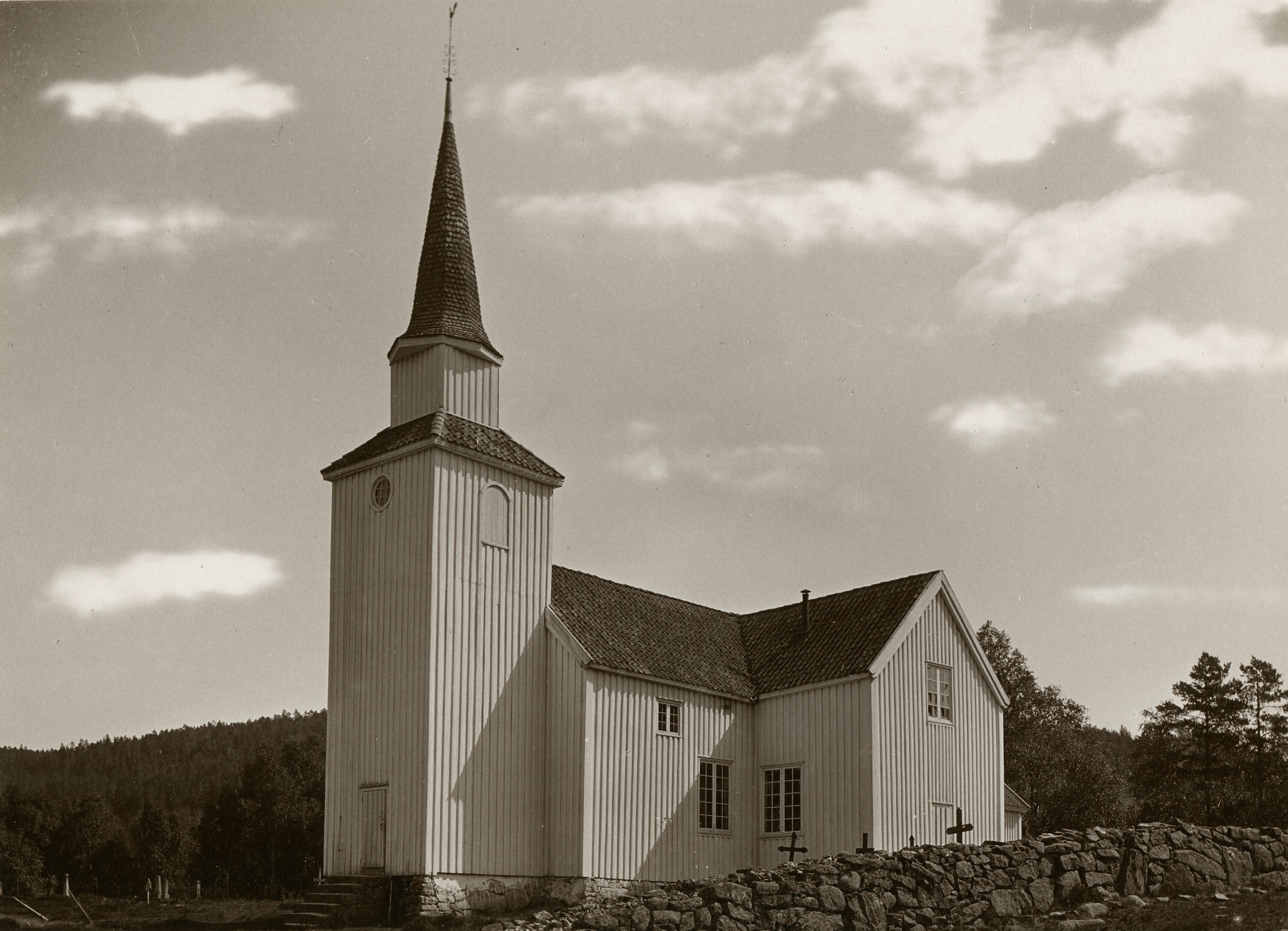
- View of the church
- Bjelland Church
- 58.3800°N 07.5278°E
- Location: Lindesnes Municipality, Agder
- Country: Norway
- Denomination: Church of Norway
- Previous denomination: Catholic Church
- Churchmanship: Evangelical Lutheran

History
- Status: Parish church
- Founded: 14th century
- Consecrated: 1793

Architecture
- Functional status: Active
- Architectural type: Cruciform
- Completed: 1793 (233 years ago)

Specifications
- Capacity: 300
- Materials: Wood

Administration
- Diocese: Agder og Telemark
- Deanery: Lister og Mandal prosti
- Parish: Marnardal
- Norwegian Cultural Heritage Site
- Type: Church
- Status: Automatically protected
- ID: 83894

Bjelland Church (Norwegian: Bjelland kyrkje) is a parish church of the Church of Norway in Lindesnes Municipality in Agder county, Norway. It is located in the village of Bjelland. It is one of the churches for the Marnardal parish which is part of the Lister og Mandal prosti (deanery) in the Diocese of Agder og Telemark. The white, wooden church was built in a cruciform design in 1793 using plans drawn up by an unknown architect. The church seats about 300 people.

== History ==
The earliest existing historical records of the church date back to the year 1413, but it was not new that year. The first church on the site was possibly a stave church and it was torn down around the year 1636 and it was replaced with a new building. In 1793, the church building was described as "so rotten and dilapidated that it is next to useless" (Norwegian: «så forråtten og brøstfeldig at den er neste ubrukelig»). That year, it was torn down and replaced with a new, timber-framed cruciform building.

In 1814, this church served as an election church (Norwegian: valgkirke). Together with more than 300 other parish churches across Norway, it was a polling station for elections to the 1814 Norwegian Constituent Assembly which wrote the Constitution of Norway. This was Norway's first national elections. Each church parish was a constituency that elected people called "electors" who later met together in each county to elect the representatives for the assembly that was to meet at Eidsvoll Manor later that year.

== See also ==
- List of churches in Agder og Telemark
