= Grindheim Church (Agder) =

Church in Agder, Norway

- Grindheim kyrkje
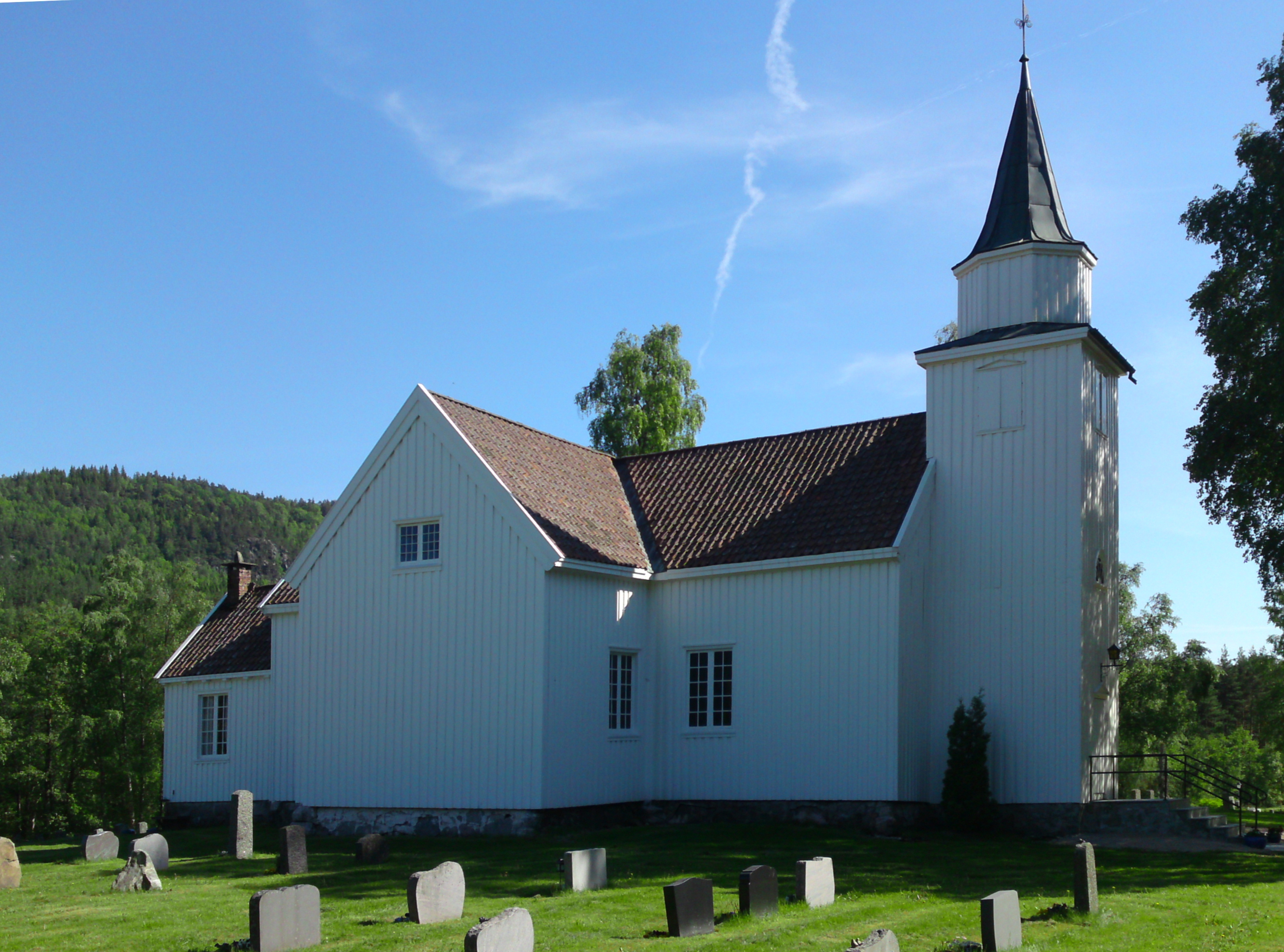
- View of the church
- Grindheim Church
- 58.437528°N 07.416756°E
- Location: Lyngdal Municipality, Agder
- Country: Norway
- Denomination: Church of Norway
- Churchmanship: Evangelical Lutheran

History
- Status: Parish church
- Founded: 14th century
- Consecrated: 1783

Architecture
- Functional status: Active
- Architectural type: Cruciform
- Completed: 1783; 243 years ago

Specifications
- Capacity: 250
- Materials: Wood

Administration
- Diocese: Agder og Telemark
- Deanery: Lister og Mandal prosti
- Parish: Grindheim
- Norwegian Cultural Heritage Site
- Type: Church
- Status: Automatically protected
- ID: 84425

Grindheim Church (Norwegian: Grindheim kyrkje) is a parish church of the Church of Norway in Lyngdal Municipality in Agder county, Norway. It is located in the village of Grindheim. It is the church for the Grindheim parish which is part of the Lister og Mandal prosti (deanery) in the Diocese of Agder og Telemark. The white, wooden church was built in a cruciform design in 1783 using plans drawn up by an unknown architect. The church seats about 250 people.

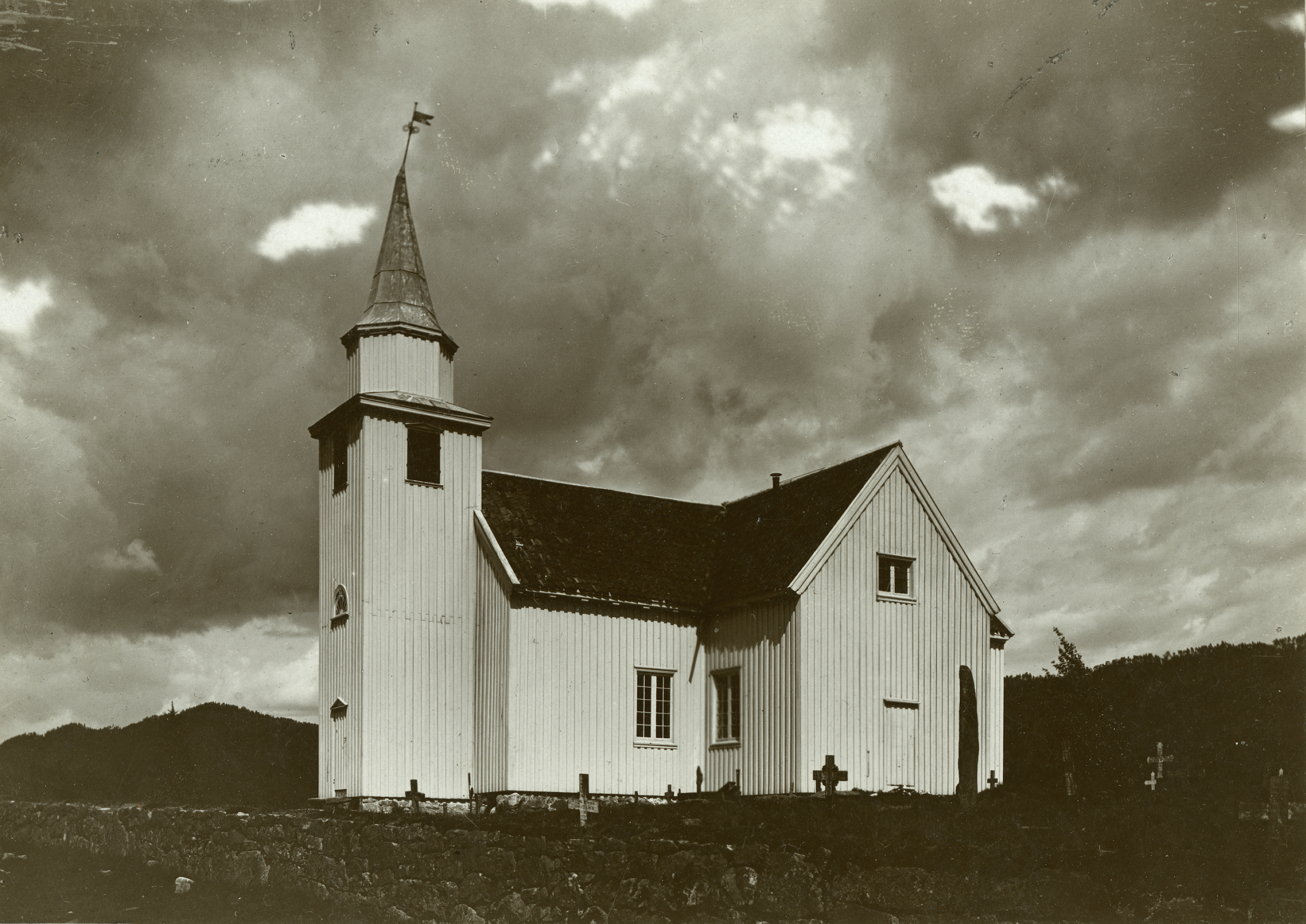
View of the church around the year 1900.

== History ==
The earliest existing historical records of the church date back to the year 1425, but the church was not new that year. The old medieval church was torn down in 1783 and replaced with a new building on the same site. In 1791, the church interior was decorated with rosemåling by Tore Asbjørnson Risøyne. In 1898, the decorations were painted over, because it was felt that the congregation spent too much time looking at them during services. In 1941, the decorations were uncovered as part of a major restoration project.

== See also ==
- List of churches in Agder og Telemark
