= Byremo =

Village in Lyngdal Municipality, Norway

- Village
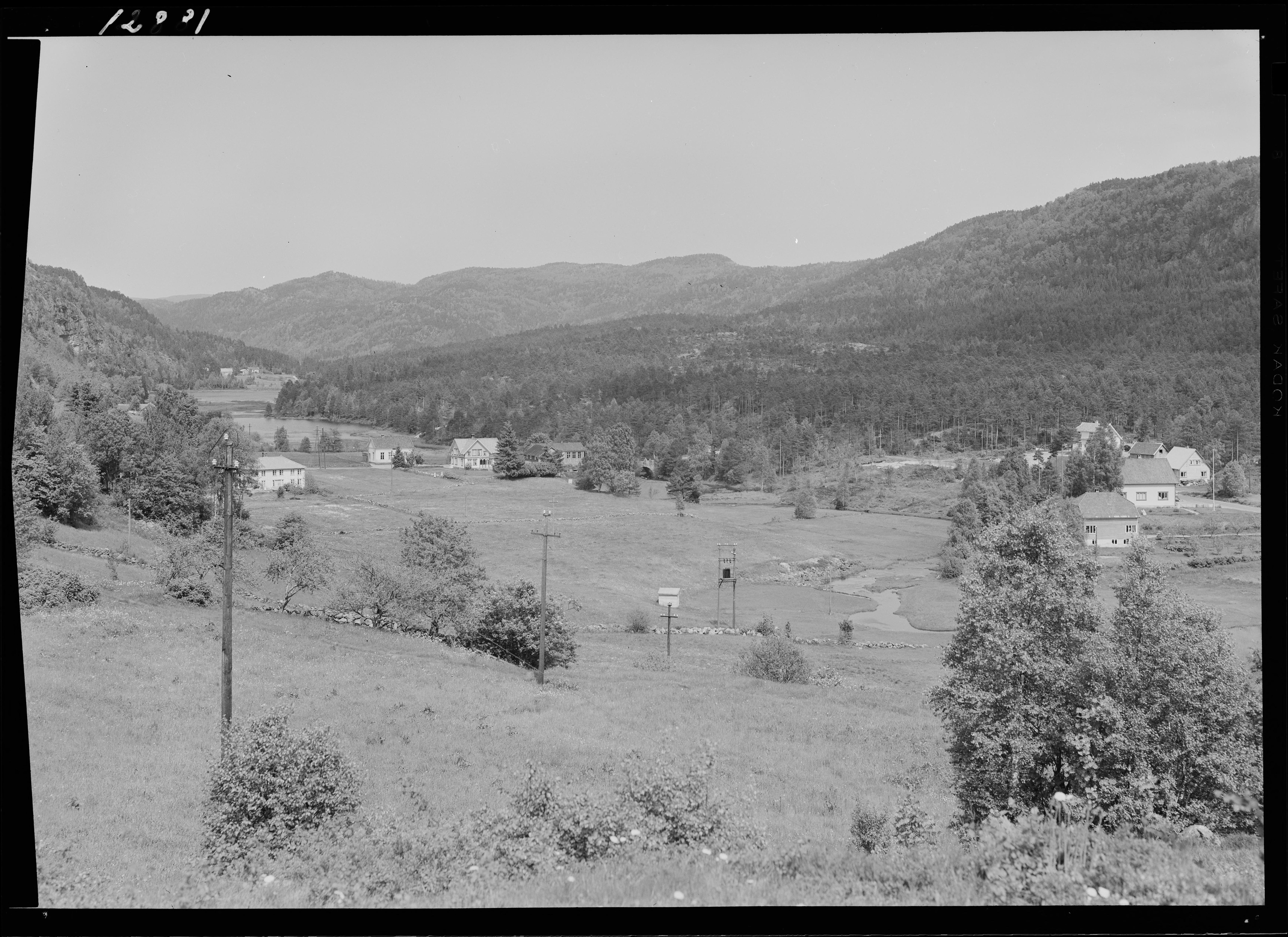
- View of the village farms (c. 1953)
- Interactive map of Byremo
- Coordinates: 58.42139°N 7.40277°E
- Country: Norway
- Region: Southern Norway
- County: Agder
- District: Lister
- Municipality: Lyngdal Municipality

Area
  - Total: 0.31 km^{2} (0.12 sq mi)
- Elevation: 118 m (387 ft)

Population (2019)
  - Total: 279
  - Density: 900/km^{2} (2,300/sq mi)
- Time zone: UTC+01:00 (CET)
  - Summer (DST): UTC+02:00 (CEST)
- Post Code: 4529 Byremo

Byremo is a village in Lyngdal Municipality in Agder county, Norway. The village is located on the north end of the lake Øvre Øydnevatn, about 15 kilometres (9.3 mi) north of the village of Konsmo.

The 0.31-square-kilometre (77-acre) village had a population (2019) of 279 and a population density of 900 inhabitants per square kilometre (2,300/sq mi). Since 2019, the population and area data for this village area has not been separately tracked by Statistics Norway.

Byremo is the site of a medical clinic and a local elementary and high school. There is some timber/lumber industries located in the village, as well as a bank, grocery store, and gas station. The small Grindheim farm lies on the north side of Byremo, and it is the site of Grindheim Church.

== History ==
Byremo was also the administrative centre of the old Grindheim Municipality until its dissolution in 1964.
