= Wulfsberg =

Wulfsberg is a surname. Notable people with the surname include:

- Gregers Winther Wulfsberg (1780–1846), Norwegian jurist and politician
- Henriette Wulfsberg (1843–1906), Norwegian school owner and writer
- Niels Wulfsberg (1775–1852), Norwegian priest, newspaper editor, and publisher

== See also ==
- Wolfsberg (disambiguation)
