= Nord-Audnedal Municipality =

Former municipality in Vest-Agder, Norway

Nord-Audnedal Municipality Nord-Audnedal herred
- Former municipality
- Nordre Undal herred (historic name)
- Vest-Agder within Norway

- Nord-Audnedal within Vest-Agder
- Coordinates: 58°12′10″N 07°20′02″E
- Country: Norway
- County: Vest-Agder
- District: Sørlandet
- Established: 1845
  - Preceded by: Undal Municipality
- Disestablished: 1 Jan 1911
  - Succeeded by: Vigmostad Municipality and Konsmo Municipality
- Administrative centre: Vigmostad

Government
  - Mayor (1905–1910:): Aanen Olson Viblemo

Area (upon dissolution)
  - Total: 198.8 km^{2} (76.8 sq mi)
- Highest elevation: 517 m (1,696 ft)

Population (1911)
  - Total: 1,705
  - Density: 8.576/km^{2} (22.21/sq mi)
- Time zone: UTC+01:00 (CET)
  - Summer (DST): UTC+02:00 (CEST)
- ISO 3166 code: NO-1027

Nord-Audnedal or Nordre Undal is a former municipality in the old Vest-Agder county, Norway. The 198.8-square-kilometre (76.8 sq mi) municipality existed from 1845 until its dissolution in 1911. The area is now divided between Lindesnes Municipality and Lyngdal Municipality in the traditional district of Lister in Agder county. The administrative centre was the village of Vigmostad where Vigmostad Church is located.

== General information ==
The municipality of Nordre Undal was established in 1845 when the old Undal Municipality was divided into two parts: the southern part (population: 3,893) became Søndre Undal Municipality and the northern part (population: 802) became Nordre Undal Municipality.

On 1 January 1911, Nordre Undal Municipality ceased to exist when it was divided into two municipalities: the northern district (population: 782) became the new Konsmo Municipality and the southern district (population: 923) became the new Vigmostad Municipality.

=== Name ===
The municipality (originally the parish) is named after an older name for the Audnedalen valley (Old Norse: Auðnudalr). The prefix nord or nordre means "northern" since it is the northern part of the valley. The first element of the name is the genitive case of the river name Auðna (now Audna). The river name is derived from the word auðn which means "destruction" or "wasteland" (because of the flooding that often happens along the river). The last element is dalr which means "valley" or "dale".

During its existence, the name of the municipality was Nordre Undal Municipality (an older version of the valley name that was a shortened and corrupted version of the original Old Norse name). The municipality ceased to exist in 1911, but on 3 November 1917, a royal resolution changed the spelling of many names in Norway and the church parish name was changed to Nord-Audnedal. This was a more modern spelling of the name which was introduced to bring back the historical Old Norse spelling of the name. During its existence, the municipality was never called Nord-Audnedal Municipality, but since 1917, the old municipality has been known as Nord-Audnedal.

=== Churches ===
The Church of Norway had one parish (sokn) within Nordre Undal Municipality. At the time of the municipal dissolution, it was part of the Nordre Undal prestegjeld and the Mandal prosti (deanery) in the Diocese of Agder.

Churches in Nordre Undal Municipality
Parish (sokn)	Church name	Location of the church	Year built
Nordre Undal	Vigmostad Church	Vigmostad	1848
Nordre Undal	Konsmo Church	Konsmo	1802

== Geography ==
The highest point in the municipality was the 517-metre (1,696 ft) tall mountain Feiåsbergan, on the border with Hægebostad Municipality. Grindum Municipality was located to the north, Bjelland Municipality was located to the northeast, Laudal Municipality was located to the east, Øyslebø Municipality was located to the southeast, Søndre Undal Municipality was located to the south, Lyngdal Municipality was located to the southwest, Kvaas Municipality was located to the west, and Hægebostad Municipality was located to the northwest.

== Government ==
While it existed, Nordre Undal Municipality was governed by a municipal council of directly elected representatives. The mayor was indirectly elected by a vote of the municipal council. The municipality was under the jurisdiction of the Mandal District Court and the Agder Court of Appeal.

=== Mayors ===
The mayor (Norwegian: ordfører) of Nordre Undal Municipality was the political leader of the municipality and the chairperson of the municipal council. The following people have held this position:

- 1845–1845: Salve Eirikson Ougland
- 1846–1847: Leiv Person Spilling
- 1848–1851: Abraham Tønnesson Landås
- 1852–1853: Per Person Spilling
- 1854–1863: Aanen Egeland
- 1864–1867: Knud Olsen Vigmostad
- 1868–1873: Kristian Knudsen Gislefos
- 1874–1877: Ola Simonson Mosland
- 1878–1879: Per Aanenson Vigmostad
- 1880–1904: Per Person Spilling
- 1905–1910: Aanen Olson Vivlemo

== See also ==
- List of former municipalities of Norway
