= Tiden =

Tiden is the Norwegian, Swedish and Danish word for "the time". It may refer to:

- Tiden (Christiania newspaper), Norwegian newspaper, published 1808–11 and 1813–14
- Tiden (magazine), Swedish theoretical political magazine
- Tiden (Arendal newspaper), Norwegian newspaper, published 1906–41 and 1945–82
- Drammens Tidende, Norwegian newspaper, formerly called Tiden, published starting 1832
- Tiden Norsk Forlag, Norwegian publisher
