= Ragnvald Gjerløw =

Norwegian priest and writer

Ragnvald Gjerløw (17 June 1853 – 1936) was a Norwegian priest and writer.

He was born in Aurland Municipality as a son of Jens Larsen Gjerløw and Anne Marie Nitter Ohnstad. He was a brother of Mons Klingenberg Gjerløw. He spent some time at sea and took secondary education before enrolling in higher education. He graduated with the cand.theol. degree in 1881, and worked as a teacher and school manager until 1887, when he became curate at Kvinnherad Church. He was then vicar in Lunde Church in Telemark from 1895 to 1906, in St. Johannes Church, Stavanger, from 1906 to 1909 and in Stavanger Cathedral from 1909 to 1918. He then became dean in the Diocese of Christianssand, and in 1925 he was acting bishop of the newly created Diocese of Stavanger. On 1 July 1925 he resigned and moved to Oslo. He has been credited for playing a main role in re-establishing the Diocese of Stavanger, having agitated for it since 1919, and presented the case for Rogaland county council. In 1923 he was part of a delegation (together with County Governor Thorvald Andreas Larsen and school inspector Tveteraas) to the Parliament of Norway. They met with the President of the Parliament and politician Tjalve Gjøstein, and also won the support of politician Lars Oftedal.

Gjerløw was a member of the board of the trade union Norwegian Association of Clergy, and also of the Norwegian Missionary Society. He wrote some books, including Bibelske skisser and Korte søndagsbetragtninger, and contributed to the works Bibelen med forklaringer and Stavangerboken 1814–1914. He also translated Alfred Edersheim's seven-volume Bible History to Norwegian. He wrote several articles in newspapers and magazines, and favored Morgenbladet, where his nephew Olaf Gjerløw was editor-in-chief from 1920. He was also an uncle of Lilli Gjerløw. In September 1885 he married Laura Flood at Heddal Stave Church. She was the sister of Immanuel Flood and Jørgen W. Flood. He died in 1936.
