= Lilli Gjerløw =

Norwegian archivist and liturgical historian

Lilli Gjerløw (19 June 1910 – 4 December 1998) was a Norwegian archivist and liturgical historian. She was employed at the National Archives of Norway for 45 years.

== Biography ==
She was born in Nordre Undal Municipality as a daughter of vicar John Jenssøn Gjerløw (1856–1915) and Agnes Christine Boye. The family (after the father's death) moved to Arendal when she was young. She was a niece of Mons Klingenberg Gjerløw and Ragnvald Gjerløw and a first cousin of Olaf Gjerløw. From 1946 to 1949 she was married to Albert Lange Fliflet (1908–2001).

She took the examen artium in 1929 in Arendal and then the preparatory tests at the University of Oslo. She studied palaeography at the École Nationale des Chartes from 1932 to 1935. In 1937 she did archival studies in Sweden, Finland and Scotland, and in 1938 in the Vatican Archives. She worked at Norsk Historisk Kjeldeskriftinstitutt, a department of the National Archives of Norway from 1935 to 1980. She took the dr.philos. degree in 1962 on the thesis Adoratio Crucis. The Regularis Concordia and the Decreta Lanfranci about the Regularis Concordia. Her specialty was the unveiling of medieval liturgical texts from the countries around the North Sea. In the series Libri liturgici provinciae Nidrosiensis medii aevi she published volume two, Ordo Nidrosiensis Ecclesiae (Orðubók) in 1968, and volume three, Antiphonarium Nidrosiensis Ecclesiae in 1979. Her two-volume Liturgica Islandica from 1980 constitutes the volumes 35 and 36 of Bibliotheca Arnamagnaeana. She also studied the history of the Hebrides from 1952 to 1953 with a NAVF scholarship, and contributed to the encyclopedia Kulturhistorisk leksikon for nordisk middelalder.

In 1982, Gjerløw was awarded the Fridtjof Nansen Prize for Outstanding Research and in 1984 she was elected to the Norwegian Academy of Science and Letters. She died in December 1998 in Oslo.

== Selected works ==
- Etude sur la littérature scandinave qui dérive de la Karlamagnússaga (1935)
- Adoratio Crucis. The Regularis Concordia and the Decreta Lanfranci (1961)
- Ordo Nidrosiensis Ecclesiae (1968)
- Antiphonarium Nidrosiensis Ecclesiae (1979)
- Liturgica Islandica (1980)
