= Adresse-Tidende =

Norwegian newspaper

Adresse-Tidende for Brevig, Stathelle, Langesund, Bamble og Eidanger (nicknamed Brevigs Adresse) was a Norwegian newspaper, published in Brevik in Telemark county.

== History and profile ==
Adresse-Tidende was started on 18 June 1849, in a city which was conspicuously small for hosting a newspaper. The newspaper also covered Brevik's surrounding districts. The founder and first editor-in-chief was William Thrane, theologian, former journalist in Statsborgeren and first cousin of Marcus Thrane.

The theologian Thrane had a conservative tint, but had an unconventional style of writing. He sometimes had feuds with Herman Bagger, editor of Correspondenten, even though Adresse-Tidende and Correspondenten strictly belonged to different cities. After Thrane's death in 1878, his widow published the newspaper until it went defunct on 3 May 1898.
