= Vigmostad Municipality =

Former municipality in Vest-Agder, Norway

Vigmostad Municipality Vigmostad herad
- Former municipality
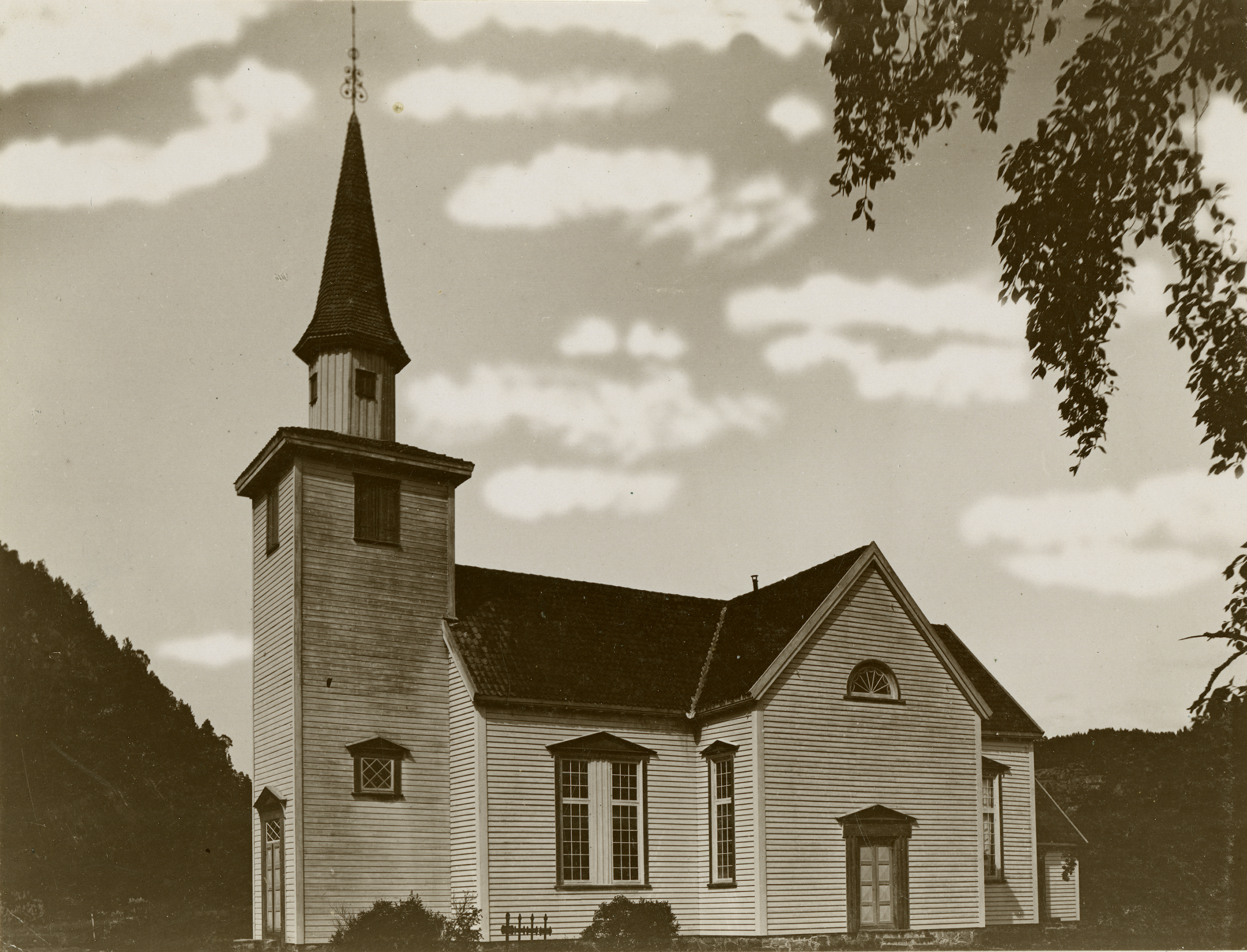
- View of Vigmostad Church in the early 1900s

- Vest-Agder within Norway

- Vigmostad within Vest-Agder
- Coordinates: 58°12′10″N 07°20′02″E
- Country: Norway
- County: Vest-Agder
- District: Sørlandet
- Established: 1 Jan 1911
  - Preceded by: Nordre Undal Municipality
- Disestablished: 1 Jan 1964
  - Succeeded by: Lindesnes Municipality
- Administrative centre: Vigmostad

Government
  - Mayor (1960–1964): Torleif Gabrielsen (Sp)

Area (upon dissolution)
  - Total: 91.6 km^{2} (35.4 sq mi)
  - Rank: #527 in Norway
- Highest elevation: 368 m (1,207 ft)

Population (1963)
  - Total: 603
  - Rank: #668 in Norway
  - Density: 6.6/km^{2} (17/sq mi)
  - Change (10 years): ▼ −8.6%
- Demonym: Vigmostadfolk

Official language
  - Norwegian form: Nynorsk
- Time zone: UTC+01:00 (CET)
  - Summer (DST): UTC+02:00 (CEST)
- ISO 3166 code: NO-1028

Vigmostad is a former municipality in the old Vest-Agder county, Norway. The 91.6-square-kilometre (35.4 sq mi) municipality existed from 1911 until its dissolution in 1964. The area is now part of Lindesnes Municipality in Agder county. The administrative centre was the village of Vigmostad where Vigmostad Church is located.

Prior to its dissolution in 1964, the 91.6-square-kilometre (35.4 sq mi) municipality was the 527th largest by area out of the 689 municipalities in Norway. Vigmostad Municipality was the 668th most populous municipality in Norway with a population of about 603. The municipality's population density was 6.6 inhabitants per square kilometre (17/sq mi) and its population had decreased by 8.6% over the previous 10-year period.

== General information ==
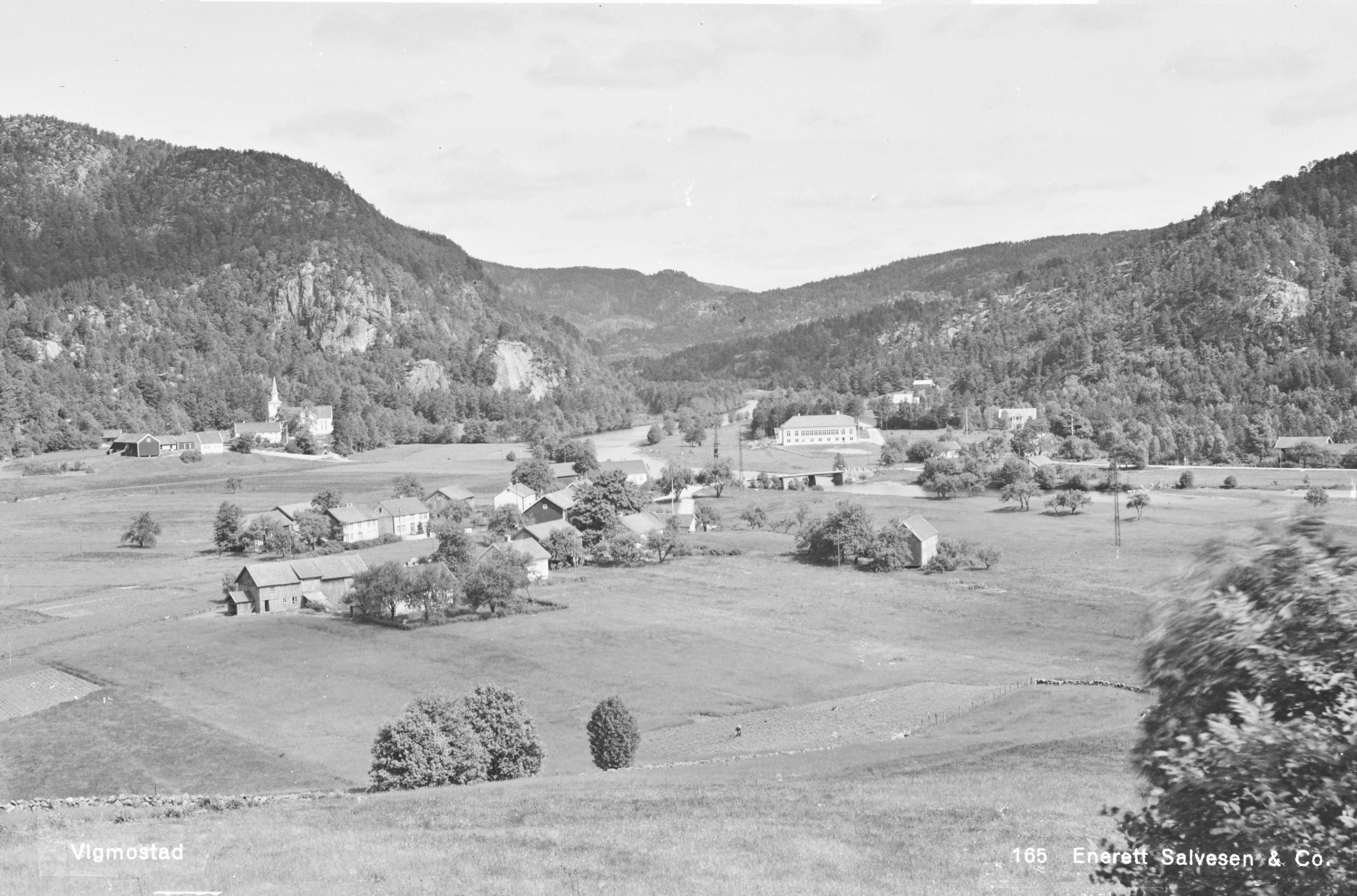
View of the Vigmostad area in 1941

The municipality of Vigmostad was established on 1 January 1911 when the old Nordre Undal Municipality was divided into two: the southern district (population: 923) became the new Vigmostad Municipality and the northern district (population: 782) became the new Konsmo Municipality.

During the 1960s, there were many municipal mergers across Norway due to the work of the Schei Committee. On 1 January 1964, Vigmostad Municipality was dissolved and the following areas were merged to form the new Lindesnes Municipality:

- all of Vigmostad Municipality (population: 589)
- all of Spangereid Municipality (population: 899)
- all of Sør-Audnedal Municipality (population: 2,323)

=== Name ===
The municipality (originally the parish) is named after the old Vigmostad farm (Old Norse: Vígmundarstaðir or Vígmarstaðir) since the first Vigmostad Church was built there. The first element is derived from an old male given name, either Vígmundr or Vigmarr. The last element is the plural form of staðr which means "place" or "abode".

=== Churches ===
The Church of Norway had one parish (sokn) within Vigmostad Municipality. At the time of the municipal dissolution, it was part of the Nord-Audnedal prestegjeld and the Mandal prosti (deanery) in the Diocese of Agder.

Churches in Vigmostad Municipality
Parish (sokn)	Church name	Location of the church	Year built
Vigmostad	Vigmostad Church	Vigmostad	1848

== Geography ==
The municipality was located in the lower Audnedalen valley, through which the river Audna flows. The highest point in the municipality was a 368-metre (1,207 ft) point near the peak of the mountain Bronehei (the peak was in the neighboring Lyngdal Municipality and the municipal border was just east of the peak). Konsmo Municipality was located to the north, Laudal Municipality was located to the northeast, Øyslebø Municipality was located to the east, Sør-Audnedal Municipality was located to the south, Lyngdal Municipality was located to the southwest, and Kvås Municipality was located to the west.

== Government ==
While it existed, Vigmostad Municipality was responsible for primary education (through 10th grade), outpatient health services, senior citizen services, welfare and other social services, zoning, economic development, and municipal roads and utilities. The municipality was governed by a municipal council of directly elected representatives. The mayor was indirectly elected by a vote of the municipal council. The municipality was under the jurisdiction of the Mandal District Court and the Agder Court of Appeal.

=== Municipal council ===
The municipal council (Heradsstyre) of Vigmostad Municipality was made up of representatives that were elected to four year terms. The tables below show the historical composition of the council by political party.

Vigmostad heradsstyre 1959–1963
Party name (in Nynorsk)	Number of representatives
Labour Party (Arbeidarpartiet)	2
Centre Party (Senterpartiet)	7
Liberal Party (Venstre)	4
Total number of members:	13
Note: On 1 January 1964, Vigmostad Municipality became part of Lindesnes Municipality.

Vigmostad heradsstyre 1955–1959
Party name (in Nynorsk)	Number of representatives
Labour Party (Arbeidarpartiet)	3
Farmers' Party (Bondepartiet)	7
Liberal Party (Venstre)	3
Total number of members:	17

Vigmostad heradsstyre 1951–1955
Party name (in Nynorsk)	Number of representatives
Labour Party (Arbeidarpartiet)	3
Farmers' Party (Bondepartiet)	6
Liberal Party (Venstre)	3
Total number of members:	12

Vigmostad heradsstyre 1947–1951
Party name (in Nynorsk)	Number of representatives
Labour Party (Arbeidarpartiet)	3
Joint List(s) of Non-Socialist Parties (Borgarlege Felleslister)	9
Total number of members:	12

Vigmostad heradsstyre 1945–1947
Party name (in Nynorsk)	Number of representatives
Labour Party (Arbeidarpartiet)	3
Farmers' Party (Bondepartiet)	6
Joint list of the Liberal Party (Venstre) and the Radical People's Party (Radikale Folkepartiet)	3
Total number of members:	12

Vigmostad heradsstyre 1937–1941*
Party name (in Nynorsk)	Number of representatives
Labour Party (Arbeidarpartiet)	2
Farmers' Party (Bondepartiet)	7
Liberal Party (Venstre)	3
Total number of members:	12
Note: Due to the German occupation of Norway during World War II, no elections were held for new municipal councils until after the war ended in 1945.

=== Mayors ===
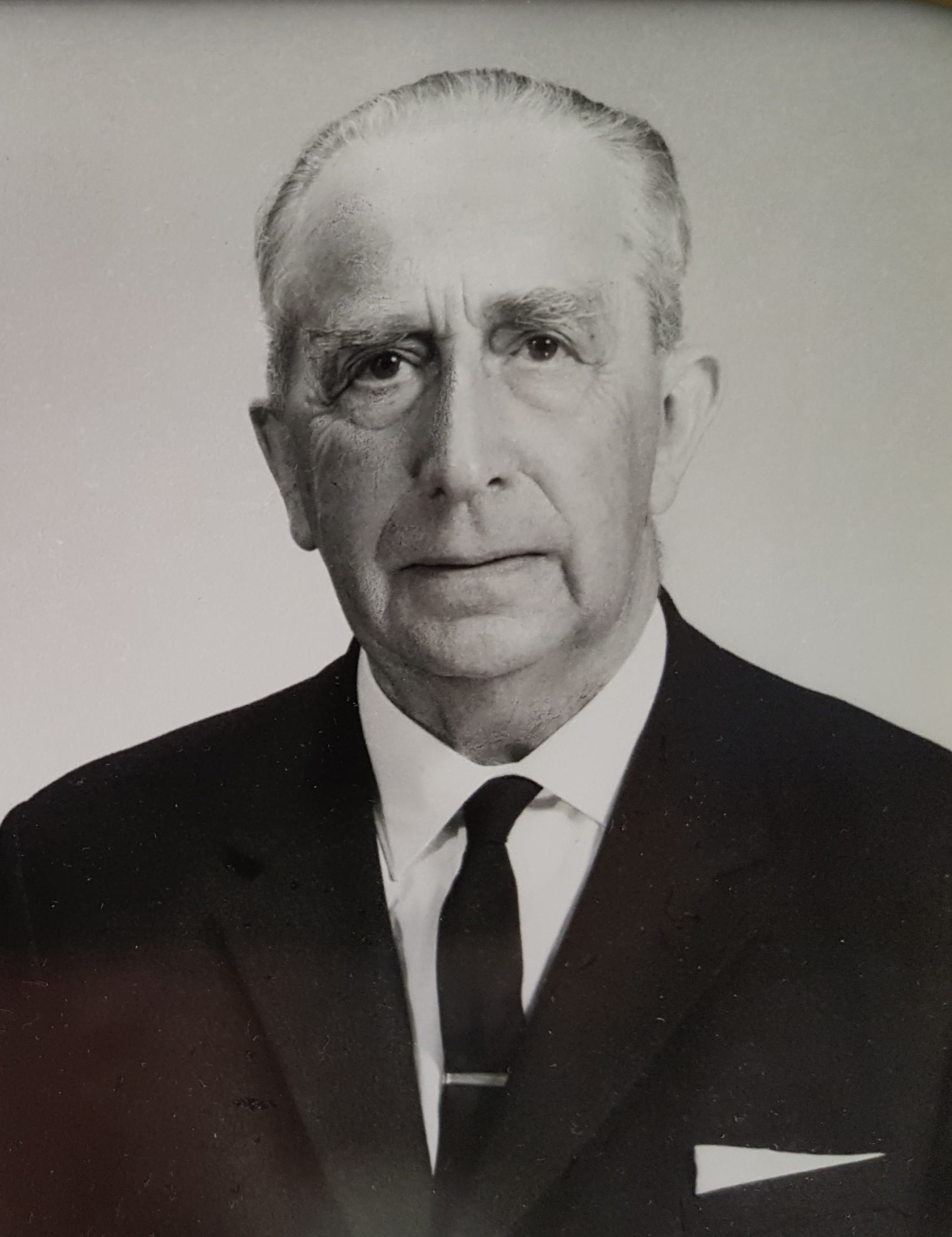
Sverre Aukland, mayor from 1948 until 1951

The mayor (Nynorsk: ordførar) of Vigmostad Municipality was the political leader of the municipality and the chairperson of the municipal council. The following people have held this position:

- 1911–1919: Per Einar Person Spilling
- 1920–1934: Ola Askildson Spilling
- 1935–1941: Daniel Ekeland (V)
- 1941–1944: Per Person Spilling
- 1944–1945: Stian Person Opsal
- 1945–1947: Daniel Ekeland (V)
- 1948–1951: Sverre Aukland (V)
- 1952–1955: Per Person Spilling
- 1956–1960: Olav Løland (Bp)
- 1960–1963: Torleif Gabrielsen (Sp)

== See also ==
- List of former municipalities of Norway
