= Egil Werner Erichsen =

Norwegian politician

Egil Werner Erichsen (4 October 1901 – 3 March 2000) was a Norwegian corporate director and politician for the Conservative Party.

He was born in Holt Municipality outside Tvedestrand in Nedenes county as a son of district physician Stian Erichsen (1867–1953) and his wife Magdalene Susanne Werner (1870–1967). His older brother was the future newspaper editor Rolv Werner Erichsen (1899–1988). During the First World War, Erichsen was hit by the Spanish flu, but did not spend one day in bed. In 1921–22, he studied economics at the University of Caen, and was thereupon employed by the American Express Company in Paris. In 1926, he graduated from the University of Oslo with a cand.oecon. degree. Between 1926 and 1937, he headed the financial redaction of the Morgenbladet newspaper. He was also editor-in-chief of the journal Økonomisk Revy from 1955 to 1970. He married Giske Rasmussen in 1930.

From 1948 to 1963, Erichsen was a member of the Oslo city council. He served as a deputy representative to the Norwegian Parliament from Oslo during the 1954–1957 term. In 1963, he was appointed chairman of the board in the light rail company Holmenkolbanen, where he stayed until 1972. In addition to this, he was deputy chairman of Oslo Sporveier from 1956 to 1967. From 1937 to 1970, Erichsen was employed in the banking association Forretningsbankenes Konjunkturinstitutt.

Erichsen wrote one book on the history of the Holmenkollen Line in 1948, and one about the Holmenkolbanen company in 1973. He also wrote several books on the history of fabric and watermill industry in Norway. In 1971, he was decorated with the St. Hallvard's Medal for his work at Holmenkolbanen.

After his retirement from politics, Erichsen continued to attend the Conservative Party's national conventions. In the 1990s, he wrote several op-eds in newspapers, in which he criticised the Norwegian media for their anti-EU sentiment and their treatment of the Conservative Party. He died on 3 March 2000, and was described in his obituary by Johan Wahl as a "man with a firm conservative attitude of the old school".

== Works ==
- Et møllefirmas historie: Moss aktiemøller gjennom 50 år 1891–1941, 1941
- Møllene ved Akerselven: Bjølsen valsemølle 1884–1944: fra vannhjulsmølle til storindustri, 1946
- 75 år i norsk tekstil. Aalgaards Uldvarefabrikker – A/S De Forenede Ullvarefabrikker D.F.U. 1870–1945, 1947
- Holmenkolbanen gjennom 50 år, 1948
- Kjøbmandsbanken: 1913–1963, 1963
- Aktieselskabet Holmenkolbanen 1948–1973, 1973
