= Henriette Wulfsberg =

Norwegian school owner and writer (1843–1906)

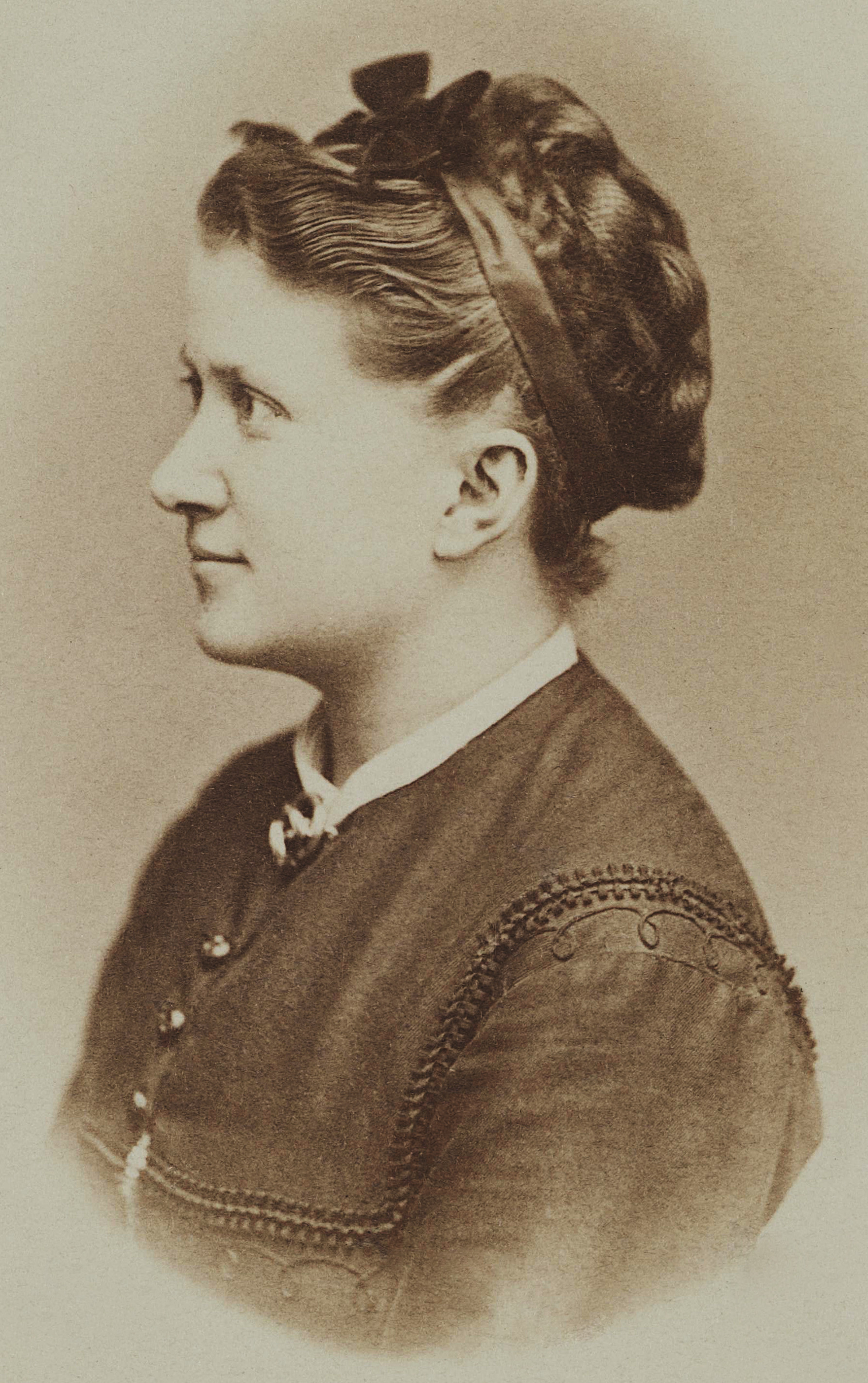
- Born: 6 June 1843; Drammen, Buskerud, Norway
- Died: 9 October 1906 (aged 63); Oslo, Norway
- Education: Hartvig Nissen School
- Relatives: Niels Wulfsberg (grandfather)
- Writing career
- Pen name: Claus

Henriette Wulfsberg (6 June 1843 – 9 October 1906) was a Norwegian educator, writer and translator.

== Early and personal life ==
Wulfsberg was born on 6 June 1843 in Drammen to Mantzine Margrethe Seeberg (1812–1883) and printer and newspaper publisher Jacob Wulfsberg (1809–1882), son of Morgenbladet's founder Niels Wulfsberg. She never married.

== Career ==
At the age of 12 or 14, she had already started to write small notices in her father's newspaper, Jacob Wulfsberg's newspaper Drammens Tidende and later wrote several articles for the paper.

After completing her education at Ms. Houbens school in Drammen, she spent a year as a governess to a Dr. Wolf in Hadeland. With savings from this job, she travelled to London, where she acted as a London correspondent for Aftenbladet, writing about everyday life in the city. When she returned to Norway in 1866, she took the governess exam at Hartvig Nissen School. She made 16 trips abroad in total to England, France, Belgium, Italy, Denmark and Sweden. Several of the trips were purely study trips, but she was also invited on multiple occasions to give lectures. trips, but she was invited on several occasions to give lectures.

In 1868, she became a teacher at Miss S. Bauer's school in Christiania and was for a short period an inspector at Bøckman's Girls' School. In 1878, she took over Ms. Bauer's school in Drammen and had a new school building built. The school was merged with Thora Bordo's school in 1886, and she set about realising building plans to provide the school with a more modern building. Despite limited funds, Wulfsberg personally supervised the construction of the new building on site. A carpenter on site said, "That miss is good for two men". Wulfsberg travelled to France and Belgium the same year to study the school system there. In 1889, she studied domestic economics in Belgium, before setting up a school kitchen on her return to Drammen. This was among the first in Norway and Wulfsberg is credited with introducing the school kitchen scheme in the country.

As a headmistress, she eagerly participated in the debate on women's further education, asking the Storting to allocate money for female teacher seminars, common schools and for higher education for girls. As well as that, she pointed out the disproportinate number of male and female teachers and the unsatisfactory pay conditions of female teachers. In 1890, she became a member of a ministerial committee to deal with questions relating the higher schools, where she spoke in favour of girls schools.

Wulfsberg was also a pioneer in teaching materials. At her request, her brother-in-law Christian Lund dictated a legal textbook to the students at Wulfsberg's girls' school. This was the first printed Norwegian textbook in jurisprudence for school students. She participated on the Act on Higher Public Schools of 1896, representing girls' school alongside Ragna Nielsen and Bernhard Pauss.

In 1896, Wulfsberg retired from the school in Drammen due to ill health. Four years later, the book Om den nye Ordning af Middelskoleexamen for Piger og Huslig Økonomi som Undervisningsfag was published, containing two of Wulfsberg's lectures. In 1884, she wrote and illustrated the book Skolehistorier with her own pen drawings using the pseudonym Claus. From 1894, she was employed by the magazine Husmoderen as well as contributing to various other magazines and newspapers.

== Later life ==
Wulfsberg died on 9 October 1906 in Oslo, after a long illness, at the age of 63. She was buried at Bragernes Cemetery
