= Correspondenten =

Norwegian newspaper

Correspondenten was a Norwegian newspaper, published in Skien in Telemark county.

Bratsberg Amts Correspondent was started on 1 January 1844, and changed its name in August 1846. It was the project of politician Herman Bagger. In 1842 he had started the newspaper Skiensposten, but he grew tired and resigned as chief editor later that year. Skiensposten survived for the time being, but went defunct in 1843. The same year, however, Bagger returned to the newspaper business, as co-editor of Bratsberg Amtstidende, founded by Peter Feilberg in 1840. The name was changed to Bratsberg Amtstidende og Correspondent. Bagger left already in 1844, to form Correspondenten while Feilberg's newspaper reverted to the name Bratsberg Amtstidende. Correspondenten was printed by Jens Melgaard, a rival of Feilberg who was also a printer. Bagger was a rival of Feilberg and Feilberg's friend (and Bagger's political competitor) Frederik Charlow Sophus Borchsenius, but also of the Adresse-Tidende editor William Thrane based in nearby city Brevik.

After Bagger retired, Correspondenten ceased to be the largest newspaper in Skien. Varden was founded in the same year and gradually took over. Correspondenten existed until December 1883. Its further history was complicated. Bratsberg Amtstidende had changed its name to Skiensposten in 1864, but absorbed its former rival Correspondenten in 1884 to again form the newspaper Bratsberg Amtstidende, which existed until 1901.
