= Lasse Midttun =

Norwegian journalist

Lasse Midttun (born 1960) is a Norwegian journalist in the weekly newspaper Morgenbladet. He does book reviews and literary critiques.

== Publications ==
- Veien til vestfronten. Essays fra en reise, 2002
