= André Kolve =

Norwegian politician

André Rajan Kolve

State Secretary
- In office December 2015 – December 2016
- Minister: Siv Jensen

Personal details
- Born: 1978 (age 47–48)
- Party: Progress Party
- Occupation: Journalist, politician

André Rajan Kolve (born 1978) is a Norwegian journalist and politician for the Progress Party.

== Biography ==
Kolve was adopted from India at a young age. Among others, he was a journalist in Porsgrunns Dagblad before starting as a communications adviser for the Progress Party parliamentary caucus. Among others, he worked closely with deputy leader Per Sandberg. At times, Kolve was accosted and accused of being an Uncle Tom figure, glossing over what the critics perceived as the Progress Party's hostile policy on immigration. The newspaper Natt & Dag made a satire on them sharing a cab, which Kolve and Sandberg found malicious. They brought the case in for the Norwegian Press Complaints Commission, who chose not to deplore Natt & Dag's piece.

When the Progress Party managed to form Solberg's Cabinet in October 2013, Kolve was appointed as a political adviser in the Ministry of Justice and Public Security. In December 2015 he made the change to was appointed State Secretary for Siv Jensen in the Ministry of Finance. He left in December 2016, citing that one could not lead a life in top-level politics indefinitely. He became a PR adviser in Gambit Hill & Knowlton, later changing bureau to Try in 2017. In 2023, he returned to journalism, working for NRK locally in Telemark.
