= Vatne =

Vatne may refer to:

== People ==
- Vatne (surname)

== Places ==
- Vatne Church, a church in Ålesund municipality, Møre og Romsdal county, Norway
- Vatne, Farsund, a village in Farsund municipality, Agder county, Norway
- Vatne, Hægebostad, a village in Hægebostad municipality, Agder county, Norway
- Vatne, Lindesnes, a village in Lindesnes municipality, Agder county, Norway
- Vatne, Møre og Romsdal, a village in Haram municipality, Møre og Romsdal county, Norway
- Vatne Municipality, a former municipality in Møre og Romsdal county, Norway
- Vatne, Rogaland, a village in Sandnes municipality, Rogaland county, Norway
- Vatne, Ørsta, a village in Ørsta municipality, Møre og Romsdal county, Norway
