= Olaf Gjerløw =

Norwegian newspaper editor (1885–1949)

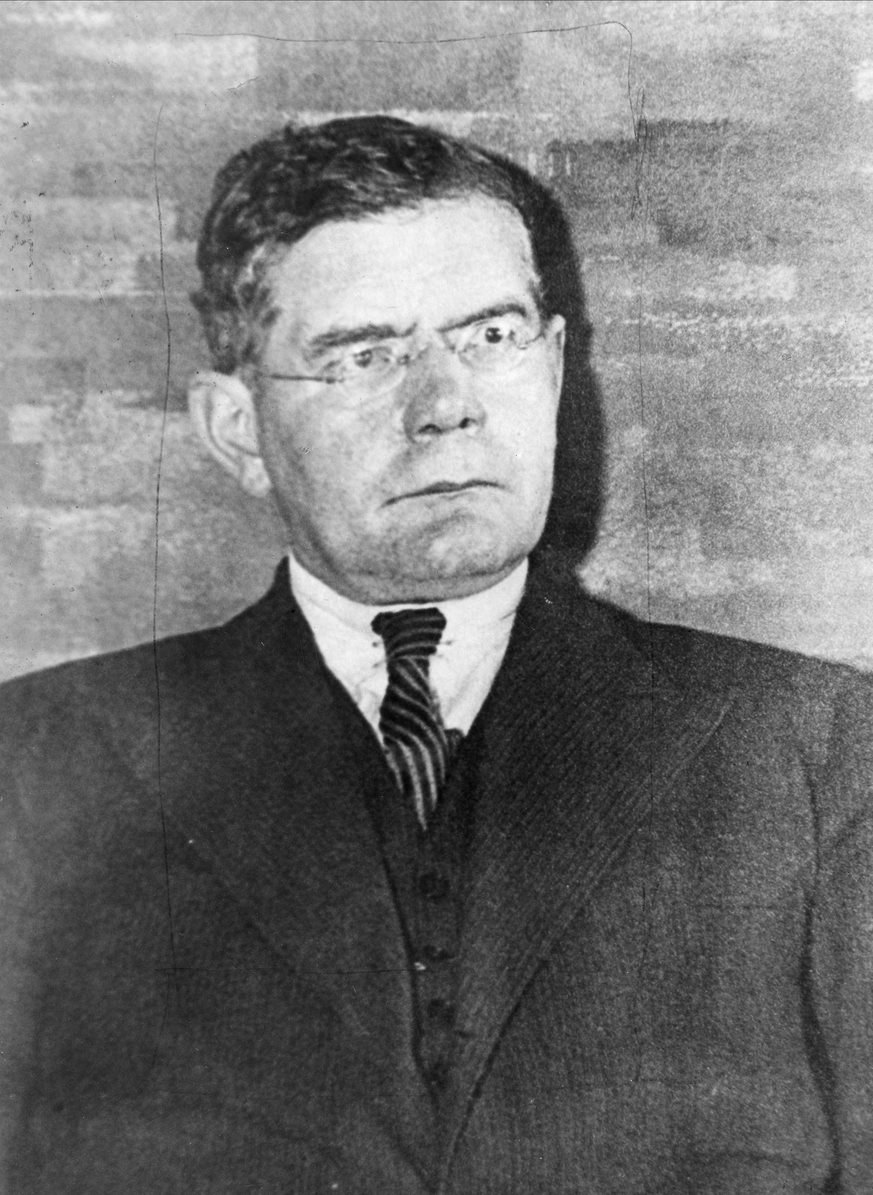
Jens Olaf Gjerløw, ca. 1935.

Jens Olaf Gjerløw (20 March 1885 – 5 December 1949) was a Norwegian newspaper editor. He was editor for the newspaper Morgenbladet from 1920 until his death in 1949, except for a period in German prisons during World War II.

== Personal life ==
Gjerløw was born in Stavanger as a son of vicar Ole Ohnstad Jensen Gjerløw (1845–1924) and Agnethe Hermine Brun (1854–1936). He grew up in Hamarøy Municipality and Vågan Municipality, where his father was stationed. He was a nephew of Mons Klingenberg Gjerløw and Ragnvald Gjerløw and a first cousin of Lilli Gjerløw. From 1914 to 1920 he was married to Gretchen Scheen (1890–1981), and from February 1924 he was married to Dagmar Helene Jæger (1889–1979), a daughter of Henrik Bernhard Jæger. He was the maternal grandfather of Socialist politician Tora Aasland.

== Career ==
Gjerløw finished his secondary education in 1903, and graduated from the Royal Frederick University in 1909 with the cand.philol. degree. In 1910 he was hired in the conservative newspaper Fredrikstad Tilskuer. After half a year he was hired in Høires Pressekontor, a centralized office that helped conservative newspapers with articles. In 1916 he went on to be sub-editor in Morgenbladet, and in 1918 he became acting editor-in-chief, succeeding Carl Joachim Hambro. He was appointed editor for the newspaper in 1920, and remained editor until 1949, except for some years during the occupation of Norway by Nazi Germany. He chaired the Conservative Press Association from 1925 to 1936. Following the milk strike in September 1941, he was arrested for "anti-German sentiments" and sentenced to fifteen years in jail. He was imprisoned at Grini concentration camp from 13 September to 8 October, then at Akershus Fortress for a week, then at Hamburg-Fuhlsbüttel from 16 October 1941 to April 1942. He was released, but kept under close scrutiny, and Morgenbladet was stopped between 1943 and 1945. Gjerløw was then editor again from 1945 to his death, when he was succeeded by Rolv Werner Erichsen.

He also wrote the conservative-tinted history work Norges politiske historie, released in three volumes between 1934 and 1936. The purpose of the work was to discredit the "Liberal Party version" of the political history, represented by Ernst Sars' works. Specifically, Gjerløw wanted to show that the Conservative Party did not lack nationalist goals. The accusations of lacking such goals stemmed from the party's attitudes to the Union between Sweden and Norway. After the war Gjerløw became less of a Conservative Party supporter; he advocated broad political cooperation and was against NATO membership. He died in December 1949 in Oslo.
