= Fremskridt =

Norwegian newspaper

Fremskridt ("Progress") was a Norwegian newspaper, published in Skien in Telemark county. It was founded in 1885, but from 1931 to 1954 it was named Fylkesavisen.

Fremskridt was started on 1 December 1885, in a situation where Skien had two major newspapers: the outspokenly liberal Varden and the more conservative Bratsberg Amtstidende. Fremskridt, which tried to occupy a middle ground, was innovative in that it became Skien's first daily newspaper in 1889; Varden followed suit in 1895. It also had a weekly edition with more in-depth coverage between 1896 and 1911, which has become popular in the 21st century. The first editor, from 1885 to 1913, was Mons Klingenberg Gjerløw, who came straight from the editor chair in Bratsberg Amtstidende.

Fremskridt absorbed Bratsberg Amtstidende in 1901. It soon shifted to become more conservative, especially after Telemark Arbeiderblad was founded in 1921. In 1931 Fremskridt changed its name to Fylkesavisen, and was synchronized with two other conservative newspapers in the district, Grenmar and Breviks Dagblad. The newspapers had the same editor, and during parts of the Second World War a Nazi editor. Varden bought the three in 1954, and all in all lost most of its liberal colour, instead supporting the Conservatives. Fylkesavisen's last edition was on 30 June 1954.

Marked editors include the first editor-in-chief, Mons Gjerløw from 1885 to 1913, and Herman Smitt Ingebretsen from 1919 to 1920.
