= Sun Heidi Sæbø =

Norwegian newspaper editor

- Born: 2 July 1980 (age 45); South Korea
- Education: Comparative politics
- Alma mater: University of Bergen; University of Shanghai
- Occupation: Newspaper editor
- Employer(s): Dagbladet; Morgenbladet

Sun Heidi Sæbø (born 2 July 1980) is a Norwegian journalist, newspaper editor, and non-fiction writer. Since 2020 she is editor-in-chief of Morgenbladet.

== Early and personal life ==
Born in South Korea on 2 July 1980, Sæbø studied comparative politics at the University of Bergen. She has also studied at the University of Shanghai.

== Career ==
From 2005 to 2019 Sæbø was assigned to the newspaper Dagbladet, assuming various editorial positions. She was appointed societal editor at the newspaper Morgenbladet in 2019. In October 2019, the day after the resignment of Anna Børve Jenssen due to internal conflicts, Sæbø was temporarily assigned as chief editor of Morgenbladet, and from January 2020 she was appointed editor-in-chief and managing director of the newspaper.

Her books include Kims lek from 2015, a biography of Kim Jong Un from 2018, and Kina – den nye supermakten from 2019.

Media offices
Preceded by Anna Børve Jenssen	Chief editor of Morgenbladet; 2020–	Succeeded by
