= Breviks Dagblad =

Norwegian newspaper

Breviks Dagblad was a Norwegian newspaper, published in Brevik in Telemark county. It was named Bratsberg Blad from 1891 to 1924.

It had a predecessor of sorts in the newspaper Telefon, started in Porsgrunn on 22 May 1889. It had the same editor as Skien newspaper Varden. Telefon went defunct after its last issue on 12 July 1890. The press in which Telefon was printed was bought by Georg Bye and moved to Brevik, whereas the rest of the newspaper was bought by Grenmar.

With his newly bought printing press, Georg Bye started Bratsberg Blad on 3 February 1891. In 1898 it absorbed the year-old competing newspaper Langesund Blad—Bratsberg Blad tried to cover Langesund, Stathelle, and Kragerø in addition to Brevik. The name was changed to Breviks Dagblad on 1 July 1924. The newspaper itself considered this to be the start of Breviks Dagblad.

Breviks Dagblad was conservative. From September 1931 it was synchronized with two other conservative newspapers in the district, Fylkesavisen (until then known as Fremskridt) from Skien and Grenmar from Porsgrunn. The newspapers had the same editor, and during parts of the Second World War a Nazi editor. Skien newspaper Varden bought the three in 1954, and all in all lost most of its liberal colour, instead supporting the Conservatives. Breviks Dagblad's last edition was on 30 June 1954.
