= Bratsberg Amtstidende =

Norwegian newspaper

Bratsberg Amtstidende was a Norwegian newspaper, published in Skien in Telemark county. It also held the names Ugeblad for Skien og Omegn (1830 to 1840), Bratsberg Amtstidende og Correspondent (1843 to 1844) and Skiensposten (1863 to 1884).

== The first ten years ==
Ugeblad for Skien, Skiens-Fjord og Omegn was started as a weekly newspaper on 1 January 1830, and omitted the "Skiens-Fjord" from its name already in July 1830. It was the project of printing press owner Peter Feilberg, who with "Ugebladet" had started the first newspaper in Skien. "Ugebladet" had no competing newspapers during its existence, the most nearby "rival" being Jarlsbergs og Laurvigs Amtstidende in Laurvig.

Feilberg and "Ugebladet" was notably convicted of libel in 1837 and sentenced to pay 60 speciedaler; the complaint had been filed by County Governor Frederik Wilhelm Wedel Jarlsberg. For comparison, a yearly subscription to Skiens Ugeblad cost 2 speciedaler. The legal case contributed to the newspaper's demise, but after releasing its final issue on 28 December 1839, it resurfaced already on 3 January 1840 under the name Bratsberg Amtstidende.

== Later history ==
Bratsberg Amtstidende soon got a competitor. Its journalist with somewhat radical political ambitions, Herman Bagger, left the newspaper in 1842 and started a competitor Skiensposten. Skiensposten survived for the time being, but went defunct in 1843. The same year, Bagger returned to Bratsberg Amtstidende as co-editor. The name was changed to Bratsberg Amtstidende og Correspondent. Bagger left already in 1844, to form Bratsberg Amts Correspondent (from 1846 Correspondenten) while Feilberg's newspaper reverted to the name Bratsberg Amtstidende.

It became the number-two-newspaper in Skien. After Feilberg's death in August 1863, it even went defunct. New publishers managed to revive it in the first half of 1864, but then with the name Skiensposten. Together with Correspondenten it eventually lost terrain to Varden (founded 1874). Despite a merger between the two old rivals to once again form Bratsberg Amtstidende in 1884, it soon lost terrain to another new newspaper Fremskridt (founded 1885). Fremskridt absorbed Bratsberg Amtstidende after the latter's last issue on 23 February 1901. At that time, the editor of Fremskridt was Mons Klingenberg Gjerløw, who had edited Bratsberg Amtstidende from 1884 to 1885.
