= Tiden (Christiania newspaper) =

19th-century Norwegian newspaper

Tiden, et offentlig Blad af blandet Indhold (English: The Time, a Public Magazine of Mixed Content) was a royalist and secessionist newspaper in 19th-century Norway. The first issue was published on 28 January 1808 in Christiania (now Oslo); the founding editor was Niels Wulfsberg. Its predecessor was Efterretninger og Opmuntringer angaaende de nærværende Krigsbegivenheder, a military periodical which was published in 43 issues in the autumn of 1807. Great Britain's blockade of Norway during the Napoleonic Wars prevented Copenhagen newspapers from being imported to Christiania; Wulfsberg started both newspapers to fill the resulting lack of information.

Tiden was published twice a week between 1808 and 1811. Wulfsberg was an impetuous editor-in-chief, occasionally printing articles critical of the governing authorities. He used the newspaper to propagate his own views on royalty and secession from Denmark—on 29 January 1810 he published an issue fully devoted to Christian August, heir to the Swedish throne. Later the same year he drew the ire of King Frederick VI, who during one of Wulfsberg's visits to Copenhagen said: "Be on guard, I don't like your paper, be on guard, I have the power to stop it." Bemoaning the high costs of paper and the low subscription incomes, Wulfsberg decided to cease Tiden's publication in 1811. The newspaper did, however, recommence publication in 1813, chiefly owing to Wulfsberg's subservient support of stattholder Christian Fredrick's governance in Norway. Press historian Svennik Høyer writes that Wulfsberg was subsequently "paid and persuaded by the political key players."

In 1814, Tiden ceased publication again; however, in the next year, Den Norske Rigstidende was established as a sequel to the paper. It was edited by Wulfsberg and Christian Døderlein. The latter person was the key player in the newspaper, whilst Wulfsberg was primarily occupied with his newly established paper Morgenbladet. Following the cessation of Den Norske Rigstidende's publication in 1832, Wulfsberg started a new newspaper named Tiden, without any obvious connection to the former newspaper. It is still published as of 2020 under the name Drammens Tidende.
