= Fredriksstad Tilskuer =

Norwegian newspaper

Fredriksstad Tilskuer was a Norwegian newspaper, published in Fredrikstad in Østfold county.

Fredriksstads Tilskuer was started in 1867 From 1879 to 1902 it was edited by landowner Harald Stabell, who turned the newspaper in a conservative direction. An anti-newspaper was established, named Fredriksstads Blad. However, Fredriksstads Tilskuer was innovative as well; from 1898 to 1902 it was the first daily newspaper in Østfold. The editor from 1902 to 1907 was Sølfest Ørn, and Sven Elvestad had a short journalist career but was fired. Another writer who started his career here was Olaf Gjerløw.

In 1902 the newspaper absorbed Fredrikstad-Posten, and in 1908 the newspaper changed its name to Fredriksstad Tilskuer. It was published from March 1912 to 30 December 1916 as Fredrikstad og Omegn Tidende, but then went defunct. It was absorbed by Fredriksstads Blad.
