= Rolv Werner Erichsen =

Norwegian newspaper editor

- Born: 2 December 1899; Holt, Norway
- Died: 22 August 1988 (aged 88); Oslo, Norway
- Occupation: Chairman of the Norwegian Press Association

Rolv Werner Erichsen (2 December 1899 – 22 August 1988) was a Norwegian newspaper editor. He was born in Holt Municipality outside Tvedestrand in Nedenes county.

== Career ==
He was born as the eldest son of district physician Stian Erichsen (1867–1953) and his wife Magdalene Susanne Werner (1870–1967). His brother was the future politician and director Egil Werner Erichsen (1901–2000). After a failed examen artium in 1919 he decided to make a journalistic career, and was employed as a night assistant by the Morgenbladet newspaper. In the 1920s, Erichsen worked as a journalist in the Parliament of Norway, notably covering the impeachment case against former Prime Minister Abraham Berge in 1926 and 1927. In addition to this, he edited the Akersposten newspaper from 1925 to 1931. A noted conservative, he established an office for the administration of the Conservative Party's newspapers in Oslo. In 1925, he was appointed secretary of the Conservative Press Association. He married Hella Tornøe the same year.

In the 1930s, Erichsen advanced positions in Morgenbladet; he became editorial secretary in 1932 and leader of the newspaper's news department in 1938. He was also leader of the editorial board together with Olaf Gjerløw. Following Gjerløw's imprisonment during the Second World War, Erichsen became alone responsible for Morgenbladet's enterprise; he was its managing director from 1939 to 1947 and its editor-in-chief from 1941 to 1943. Eventually he was also sent to the Grini concentration camp by the German occupants, which meant the immediate cessation of Morgenbladet's printings. He remained at Grini from September 1944 to April 1945.

Erichsen returned to his business after the war, acting as editor-in-chief of Morgenbladet until 1958. Before becoming managing director of the Norwegian News Agency in 1961, he penned three books on the press history of Norway. He became later secretary general of the Association of Norwegian Editors, acting from 1971 to 1978. He chaired the Norwegian Press Association from 1947 to 1954, having formerly been a board member from 1934 to 1939, and also chaired the Norwegian News Agency from 1959 to 1961 and the Norwegian Journalist Academy.

== Honours and death ==
In 1954, Erichsen was decorated as a Knight, First Class of the Order of St. Olav. He was also decorated as a Knight of the Order of the Dannebrog, the Order of the White Rose of Finland and the Order of Vasa. He died on 22 August 1988 in Oslo, and was cremated at Vestre gravlund one week later.

Media offices
Preceded by Olav Larssen	Chairman of the Norwegian Press Association; 1947–1954	Succeeded by Per Monsen
