= Mons Klingenberg Gjerløw =

Norwegian editor

Mons Klingenberg Gjerløw (11 November 1850 – 1935) was a Norwegian editor.

He was born in Aurland Municipality as a son of Jens Larsen Gjerløw and Anne Marie Nitter Ohnstad. He was a brother of Ragnvald Gjerløw. He took secondary education as well as the entrance exam at the university, but then followed a career in the press. His first article was printed in Almuevennen in 1867. He became the editor-in-chief of Illustreret Familielæsning in 1882. From 1 January 1884 to November 1885 he was the editor of Bratsberg Amtstidende, from 1 December 1885 to 1913 editor of Fremskridt, and from 1913 editor of the self-published magazine Kikut.

He was a conservative person, and steered his newspaper Fremskridt in such a direction. He was also known for his petites and causeries. Articles were collected and published in 1880, twice in 1883 and in 1893. Also in his time, Fremskridt absorbed the struggling Bratsberg Amtstidende, in 1901.

In October 1895 in Skien he married Sophie Borchgrevink. He was an uncle of Olaf Gjerløw, another conservative newspaper editor, and of Lilli Gjerløw. He died in 1935.
