= Grenmar (newspaper) =

Defunct Norwegian newspaper

Grenmar was a Norwegian newspaper, published in Porsgrunn in Telemark county.

== History and profile ==
Grenmar was started on 3 January 1878, after two trial issues in December 1877. It absorbed the much older newspaper Porsgrunds Blad in 1886 (and was named Grenmar Porsgrunds Blad for a while), and then Telefon which existed only from 1889 to 1890. Grenmar, which was conservative, got a liberal competitor in Porsgrunds Dagblad in 1914.

The newspaper stopped in April 1931. In September it was revived and synchronized with two other conservative newspapers in the district, Fylkesavisen (until then known as Fremskridt) from Skien and Breviks Dagblad from Brevik. The newspapers had the same editor, and during parts of the Second World War a Nazi editor. Skien newspaper Varden bought the three in 1954, and all in all lost most of its liberal colour, instead supporting the Conservatives. Grenmar's last edition was on 30 June 1954.
