= Skiensposten =

Norwegian newspaper from 1842 to 1843)

Skiensposten was a Norwegian newspaper, published in Skien.

Skiensposten was started in 1842 by Herman Bagger, a Danish immigrant who had worked as a jurist, teacher, farmer and politician. Before the end of the year, however, he grew tired and resigned as chief editor. Skiensposten survived for the time being, but faced competition from Bratsberg Amtstidende, a newspaper founded in 1840 by Peter Feilberg. The new owners of Skiensposten tried to halve the price, and changed its name to Skiens Adressetidende. However, this was not enough to keep it in circulation, and it went defunct near the end of 1850.

It was pressed by Jens Melgaard, a printing press rival of Peter Feilberg.
