= Porsgrunns Dagblad =

Norwegian newspaper

- Type: Daily newspaper (five days a week)
- Owner: A-pressen
- Editor: Erik Enger
- Founded: 1 December 1914
- Political alignment: Liberal (1914–?); Independent
- Headquarters: Jernbanegata 12, Porsgrunn, Norway
- Website: www.pd.no

Porsgrunns Dagblad is a Norwegian newspaper, published in Porsgrunn in Telemark county, Norway.

== History and profile ==
Porsgrunds Dagblad was started on 1 December 1914, and later modernized its name. The first editor Daniel H. Grini was an experienced press worker, and came from Varden in the neighboring city. He made Porsgrunds Dagblad into a local newspaper. In a city where the liberal newspapers Porsgrunds Blad and Porsgrunds Tidende had struggled, and the conservative newspaper Grenmar was well established, Porsgrunds Dagblad became the city's new organ for the Liberal Party. It bought both Breviksposten in 1916 and later Langesunds Blad and Skiens Dagblad. It prevailed over Grenmar, which went defunct in 1954, but faced tougher competition from the Skien-based regional newspapers Varden and Telemark Arbeiderblad.

It struggled financially, and in 1983 its Saturday edition was discontinued. It was owned by Trygve Hegnar for a period, but since 1999 it has been owned by Østlands-Posten (and A-pressen). The Saturday edition was re-established in 2009, but the Monday edition was removed at the same time. Thus it is published five days a week. Since 2004 it is a morning newspaper.

Bjørg Vik and Jahn Otto Johansen started their careers in Porsgrunns Dagblad, and the newspaper also printed feuilletons which later became books by Jon Flatabø and Karen Sundt. The current editor is Erik Enger.
