= Hroar Hansen =

Norwegian industrial leader and politician

Hroar Anton Hansen (24 April 1947 – 31 October 2015) was a Norwegian industrial leader and politician.

Hansen was known for having been the owner of the newspapers Morgenbladet and Søndag Søndag. He was a known entrepreneur during the 1980s and 1990s, having founded Norsk LCD AS in 1981, Hansen vakumrør as well as Ask. Politically he was the second deputy leader of the Progress Party from 1985 to 1991, and deputy mayor of Drammen from 1988 to 1991.
