= Anna Børve Jenssen =

Norwegian Journalist and newspaper editor

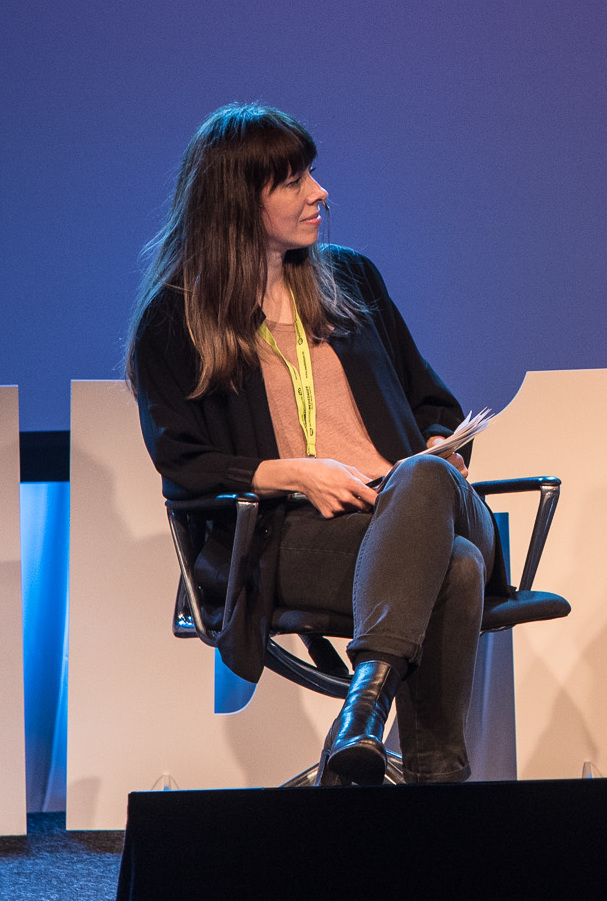
- Born: 26 September 1975 (age 50)
- Education: Norsk Journalisthøgskole
- Occupations: Journalist and newspaper editor
- Employer(s): Dagens Næringsliv; Morgenbladet

Anna Børve Jenssen (born 26 September 1975) is a Norwegian journalist and newspaper editor. She was chief editor of Morgenbladet from 2012 to 2019.

== Career ==
Born on 26 September 1975, Jenssen graduated from Norsk Journalisthøgskole in 2002. She worked for the newspaper Morgenbladet from 2002, and for Dagens Næringsliv from 2006 to 2012. She was co-editor of the anthology Nesten! in 2004. She was appointed chief editor of Morgenbladet in 2012, taking over from Alf van der Hagen, and resigned as editor in October 2019 after internal conflicts.

Media offices
| Preceded by Alf van der Hagen | Chief editor of Morgenbladet; 2012–2019 | Succeeded by Sun Heidi Sæbø |
