= Alf van der Hagen =

Norwegian newspaper editor

Alf van der Hagen (born 18 May 1962) is a Norwegian journalist.

He was the editor-in-chief of Morgenbladet in the period 2003 – 2012, leaving his position in March 2012, when Anna B. Jenssen eventually took over as chief editor. He previously worked in the Norwegian Broadcasting Corporation as a journalist, and in the book club Den norske Bokklubben. He has a cand.philol. degree, majoring in history of ideas.
