= Christian Christensen (editor) =

Norwegian intelligence officer (1922–1994)

Christian "C. C." Christensen (15 March 1922 – 5 November 1994) was a Norwegian military intelligence officer and newspaper editor.

He was born in Bærum, grew up in Stabekk, took his examen artium in 1942 and commerce school in 1943. The same year he had to flee to Sweden because of resistance work during the ongoing German occupation of Norway. He worked at the Norwegian Legation in Stockholm. From 1945 to 1955 he worked in the Norwegian Intelligence Service. He advanced from second lieutenant to major during this time. In 1948 he married Tulla Traheim (1922–1989).

From 1956 Christensen was organizational manager of the libertarian organization Libertas. In 1963 he left to become editor-in-chief of Morgenbladet, which he left in 1982. He was never uncontroversial as an editor. He was hired due to connections between Morgenbladet and Libertas, and in 1983 Libertas bought the newspaper. In 1993, however, Morgenbladet was completely reshaped.

Christensen also chaired the local branch of the Association of Norwegian Editors. He issued several books, mostly relating to his old job as an intelligence officer. He died in November 1994 in Oslo.
