= Vatne (surname) =

Vatne is a Norwegian surname. Notable people with the surname include:

- Bjarne Karsten Vatne (1926–2009), Norwegian politician for the Labour Party
- Hans Vatne (1923–1985), Norwegian newspaper editor
- Jenny Vatne (born 1997), Norwegian sports shooter
- Oddbjørn Vatne (born 1948), Norwegian politician for the Centre Party
- Paul Einar Vatne (1941–2021), Norwegian journalist, editor and non-fiction writer
- Stian Vatne (born 1974), Norwegian handball player
