= Paul Einar Vatne =

Norwegian journalist (1941–2021)

Paul Einar Vatne (28 February 1941 – 4 April 2021) was a Norwegian journalist, editor and non-fiction writer.

He was born in Hillesøy Municipality, but grew up in Ørsta Municipality. Following a short stint in Unge Høyre in 1963, he was a subeditor in Farsunds Avis from 1964 to 1967 before attending the Journalist Academy. He was hired as a journalist in the magazine Nå in 1968, then in the newspaper Fædrelandsvennen in 1970 and Sunnmørsposten in 1973. In 1976 he returned to the magazine industry to work for Allers.

From 1981 to 1985 Vatne served as editor-in-chief of Gjengangeren, then held the same position in Morgenbladet from 1985 to 1987. He was then a journalist covering politics in Aftenposten until 1993, when he took a job in Dyno Industrier. He was also chief executive officer of Bulls Press before retiring in 2008.

Vatne issued the novel Den veike og dei sterke in 1969 as well as the non-fiction books Ukjent ubåt. Tragedien i Gryllefjord (1968) and Jeg var russisk spion: historien om Selmer Nilsen (1981). His novel, published by Aschehoug, was extensively reviewed in the Norwegian press, albeit mostly with moderate to negative opinions on the book.

Vatne was married, had three children and last resided in Melsomvik.

Media offices
Preceded by Odd Gisholt (acting)	Editor-in-chief of Morgenbladet; 1985–1987	Succeeded by Hans Geelmuyden
