= Peter Feilberg =

Norwegian politician and newspaper editor

Peter Fredrik Feilberg (7 April 1800 – 5 August 1863) was a Norwegian newspaper editor, bookseller and printer, who also served as mayor of Skien Municipality.

== Biography ==
He was born in Tønsberg in Jarlsberg og Laurvig county, Norway. He was the son of Jacob Feilberg (1753–1816) and Anna Granberg (1761-1854). His family had immigrated from Flensburg, Southern Schleswig in 1787. Peter Feilberg was a dyer by education. He also operated a printing press, ran a book shop and later a rental library.

In 1830 Feilberg started Skiens Ugeblad which was the first newspaper in Skien. He was notably convicted of libel in 1837 and sentenced to pay 60 speciedaler; the complaint having been filed by County Governor Frederik Wilhelm Wedel Jarlsberg (1787-1863). Feilberg's defender Pavels Hielm (1781-1846) was also convicted of inappropriate procedure and was sentenced to pay a fine of 10 speciedaler for having recited a poem during the final speech of the defence.

Skiens Ugeblad was liquidated in 1839, but in January 1840 he started another newspaper Bratsberg Amtstidende. In 1843 Herman Bagger (1800-1880) was brought in as co-editor and the name of the newspaper was changed to Bratsberg Amtstidende og Correspondent. In 1844, Bagger left to form his own newspaper Bratsberg Amts Correspondent (later changed to Correspondenten) which was pressed by Jens Melgaard who owned a pressing plant rivaling that of Feilberg. At that time, Feilberg's newspaper reverted to its former name of Bratsberg Amtstidende. Bratsberg Amtstidende and Correspondenten would maintain a fierce rivalry.

In 1837, when local government was introduced in Norway, Feilberg was elected to the first city council of Skien. This was made possible in part when County Governor Wedel Jarlsberg stepped down that same year. Feilberg had allied with Frederik Charlow Sophus Borchsenius (1808-1880) who was a member of parliament. Feilberg then served as mayor of Skien from 1838 to 1840. Herman Bagger, who had previously served as mayor of Gjerpen Municipality, later became mayor of Skien Municipality and also a long serving member of parliament.

== Personal life ==
In 1824, he with married to his cousin Henrikke Fransiska Feilberg (1800-1872). His daughter Eleonora Amanda Feilberg (1833-1883) and her son Peter Fredrik Feilberg-Hansen (1862-1935) were also photographers. The son Karl-Fredrik Feilberg (1828-190 ) was Rector of Kristiansand Cathedral School.
