= Herman Bagger =

Norwegian newspaper editor and politician

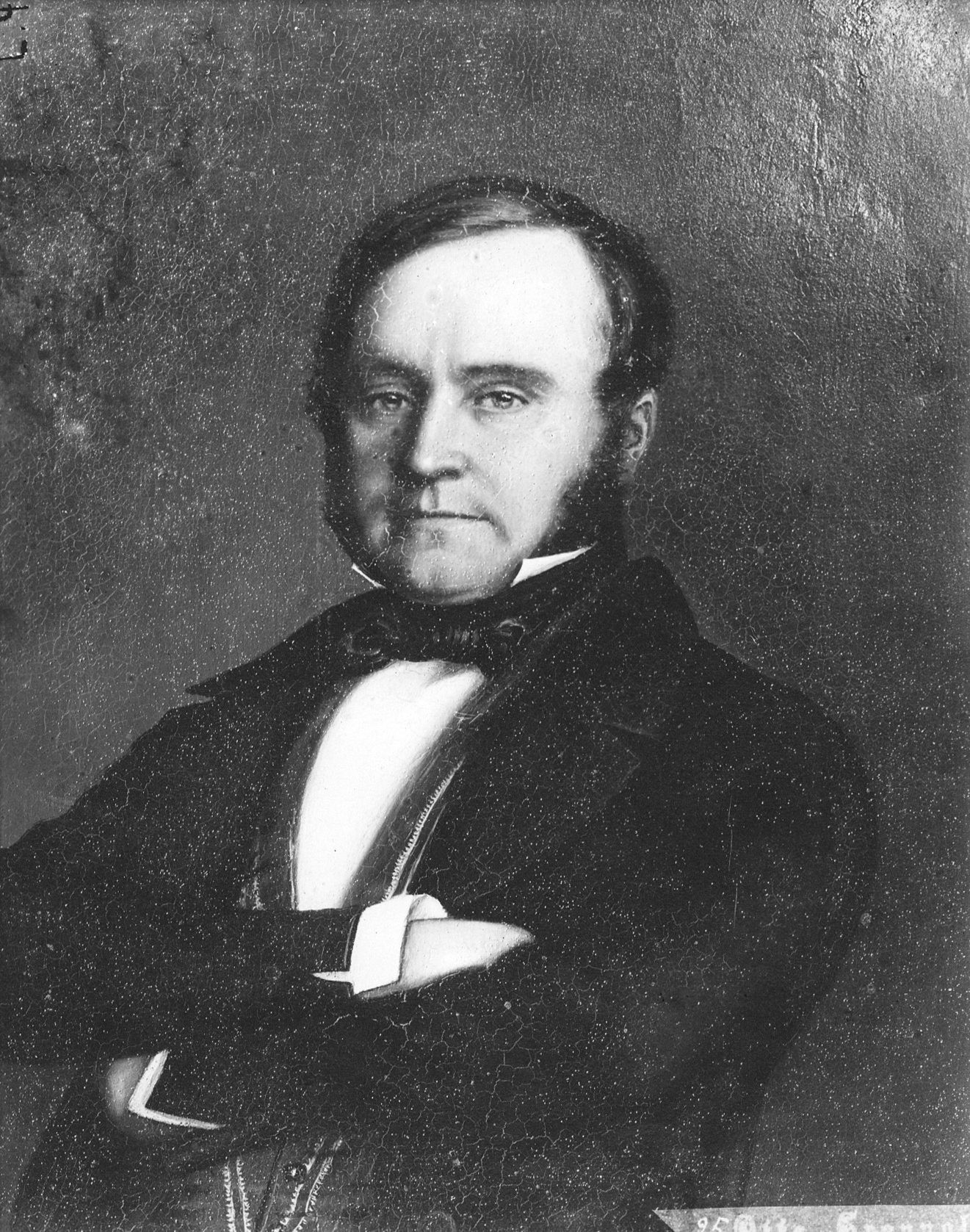
- Born: July 20, 1800; Lemvig
- Died: November 24, 1880 (aged 80)

Herman Bagger (20 July 1800 – 24 November 1880) was a Norwegian-Danish newspaper editor and politician.

== Personal life ==
Herman Bagger was born in Lemvig in Jutland, Denmark to physician Eggert Christian Bagger (1768–1812) and his wife Claudine Margrethe (1774–1838), née Borgen. He had one older brother and three younger siblings.

On 9 June 1829 he married Marthe Elise Winther (1802–1870). The couple had five sons and one daughter.

== Career ==
Bagger was a jurist by education. At the time of his marriage, he worked as a headmaster at a school in Drøbach.

In 1837, the year local government was introduced in Norway, Bagger was elected as the first mayor of Gjerpen Municipality. He held this position until 1841. He was elected to the Norwegian Parliament in 1839, representing the rural constituency of Bratsberg Amt. However, he was not re-elected in 1842. The seat was taken by Frederik Charlow Sophus Borchsenius.

In 1842 Bagger started the newspaper Skiensposten, but he grew tired and resigned as chief editor later that year. Skiensposten survived for the time being, but went defunct in 1843. The same year, however, Bagger returned to the newspaper business, as co-editor of Bratsberg Amtstidende, founded by Peter Feilberg in 1840. The name was changed to Bratsberg Amtstidende og Correspondent. Bagger left already in 1844. He formed his own newspaper Bratsberg Amts Correspondent, later renamed Correspondenten. At the same time, Feilberg's newspaper reverted its name to Bratsberg Amtstidende. Bratsberg Amtstidende and Correspondenten would from now on become fierce rivals. Correspondenten, like Skiensposten before it, was pressed by Jens Melgaard, who owned a pressing plant rivalling that of Peter Feilberg. Bagger used his newspaper for political purposes, such as when he stood for election in 1844. He attacked the incumbent Frederik Charlow Sophus Borchsenius, who in turn was defended by Feilberg in the Bratsberg Amtstidende. In the end, Borchsenius was elected, not Bagger.

By that time Bagger had moved to the nearby city of Skien. He had several supporters there, and was able to be elected mayor of that city. He served as mayor from 1847 to 1848 and 1850 to 1851, alternating with his friend Hans Severin Arentz. When living in Skien, which was a constituency of its own, Bagger was elected to the Norwegian Parliament in 1848, 1851, 1854, 1862 and 1868. His rival Borchsenius was elected as well, from Bratsbergs Amt in 1848, 1854, 1857 and 1862.

Throughout this period, Bagger edited the Correspondenten. He notably supported the radical politician Peter Bøyesen, and supported Hans and Hans Eleonardus Møller during the feud in the marine insurance business of Porsgrund. In his later years Bagger became more politically conservative. Bagger retired in 1874. Varden, which was founded in 1874, would later take over as the number one newspaper in Skien.

He died in 1880.
