= Vigmostad =

Village in Lindesnes Municipality, Norway

Vigmostad Nedre Vigmostad
- Village
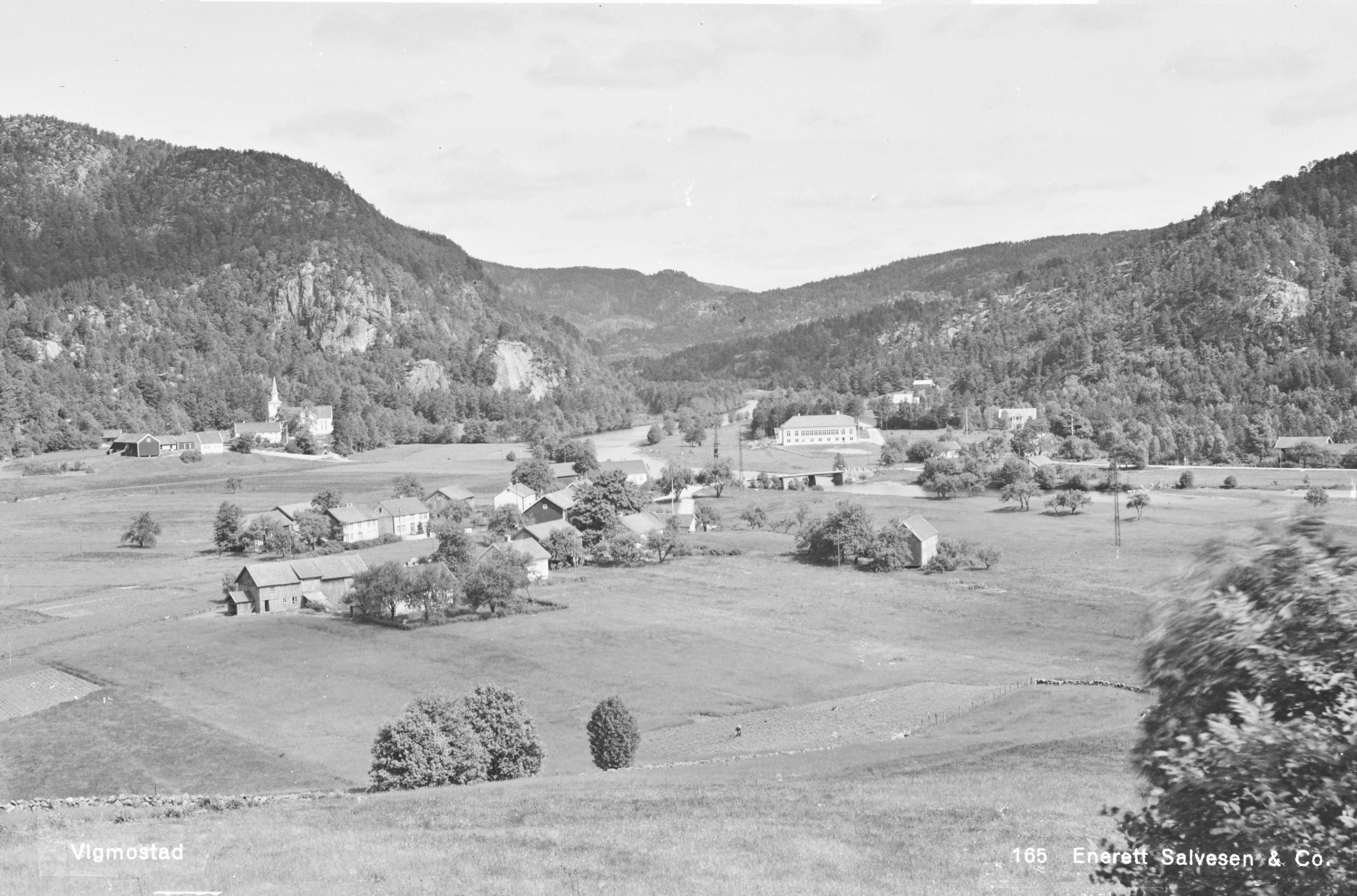
- View of the village in 1941
- Interactive map of Vigmostad
- Coordinates: 58.19958°N 7.33602°E
- Country: Norway
- Region: Southern Norway
- County: Agder
- District: Lindesnes
- Municipality: Lindesnes Municipality
- Elevation: 31 m (102 ft)
- Time zone: UTC+01:00 (CET)
  - Summer (DST): UTC+02:00 (CEST)
- Post Code: 4520 Lindesnes

Vigmostad is a village in Lindesnes Municipality in Agder county, Norway. The village is located along the Audna river in the Audnedalen valley. The village of Konsmo lies about 10 kilometres (6.2 mi) to the north and about 15 kilometres (9.3 mi) north of the village of Vigeland. Vigmostad Church is located in the village.

== History ==
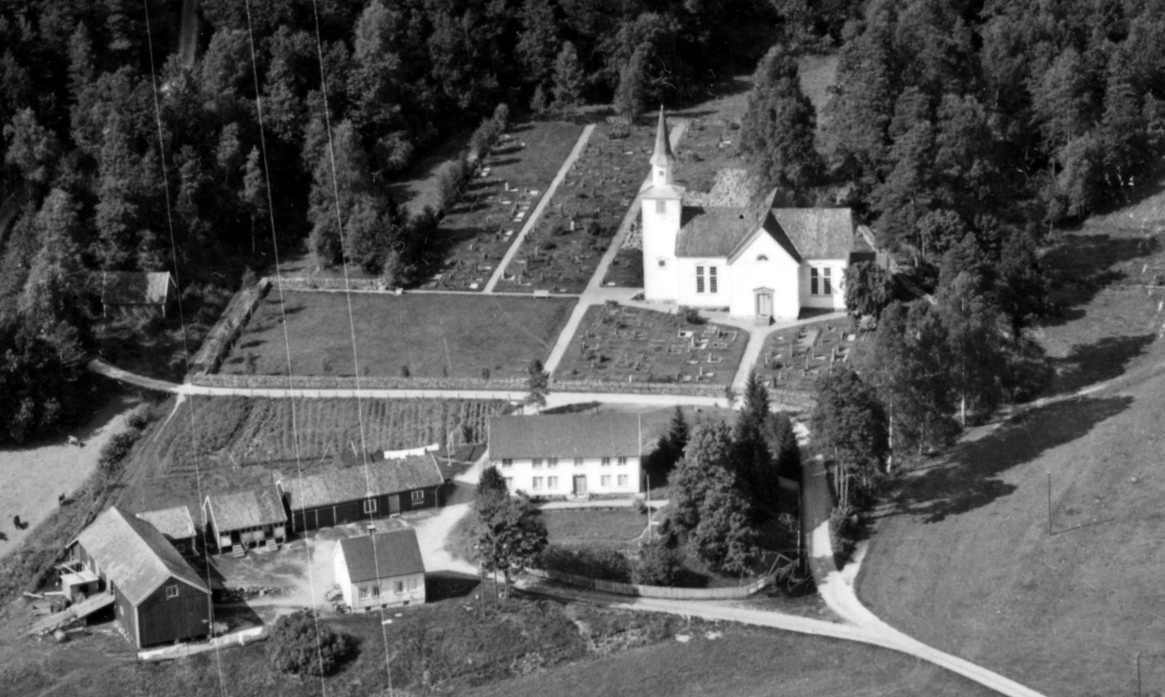
Vigmostad Church in 1953

The village was the administrative centre of the old Vigmostad Municipality which existed from 1911 until its dissolution in 1964.

=== Name ===
The village (and the parish) is named after the old Vigmostad farm (Old Norse: Vígmundarstaðir), since that is the location of Vigmostad Church. The first element of the name is the old male name Vígmundr (river-mouth) or Vígmarr (river-mare(sea)) and the last element is the nominative plural form of the word staðr which means "homestead" or "farm".
