= Porsgrunds Blad =

Norwegian newspaper

Porsgrunds Blad was a Norwegian newspaper, published in Porsgrunn in Telemark county, first established on the 1 May 1846 as Ugeblad for Porsgrund og Omegn. Initially apolitical, it became conservative-leaning, facing competition from the more clear-cut conservative newspaper, Grenmar. After a short time Porsgrunds Blad tried a liberal agenda, it went defunct in 1886 and was absorbed by Grenmar. Its last issue was printed on 31 March 1886.

== History ==
Ugeblad for Porsgrund og Omegn was started as a weekly newspaper on 1 May 1846. It struggled economically, and was auctioned in late 1848. From 4 January 1849 its name was Posttidende ("Postal Times"), from 1858 Porsgrunds Blad.

== Demise ==
It was first apolitical, then conservative-leaning, but from 1878 it faced competition from a more clear-cut conservative newspaper, Grenmar. After a short time when Porsgrunds Blad tried a liberal agenda, it went defunct in 1886 and was absorbed by Grenmar. Its last issue came on 31 March 1886.
