= Vigmostad Church =

Church in Agder, Norway

- Vigmostad kirke
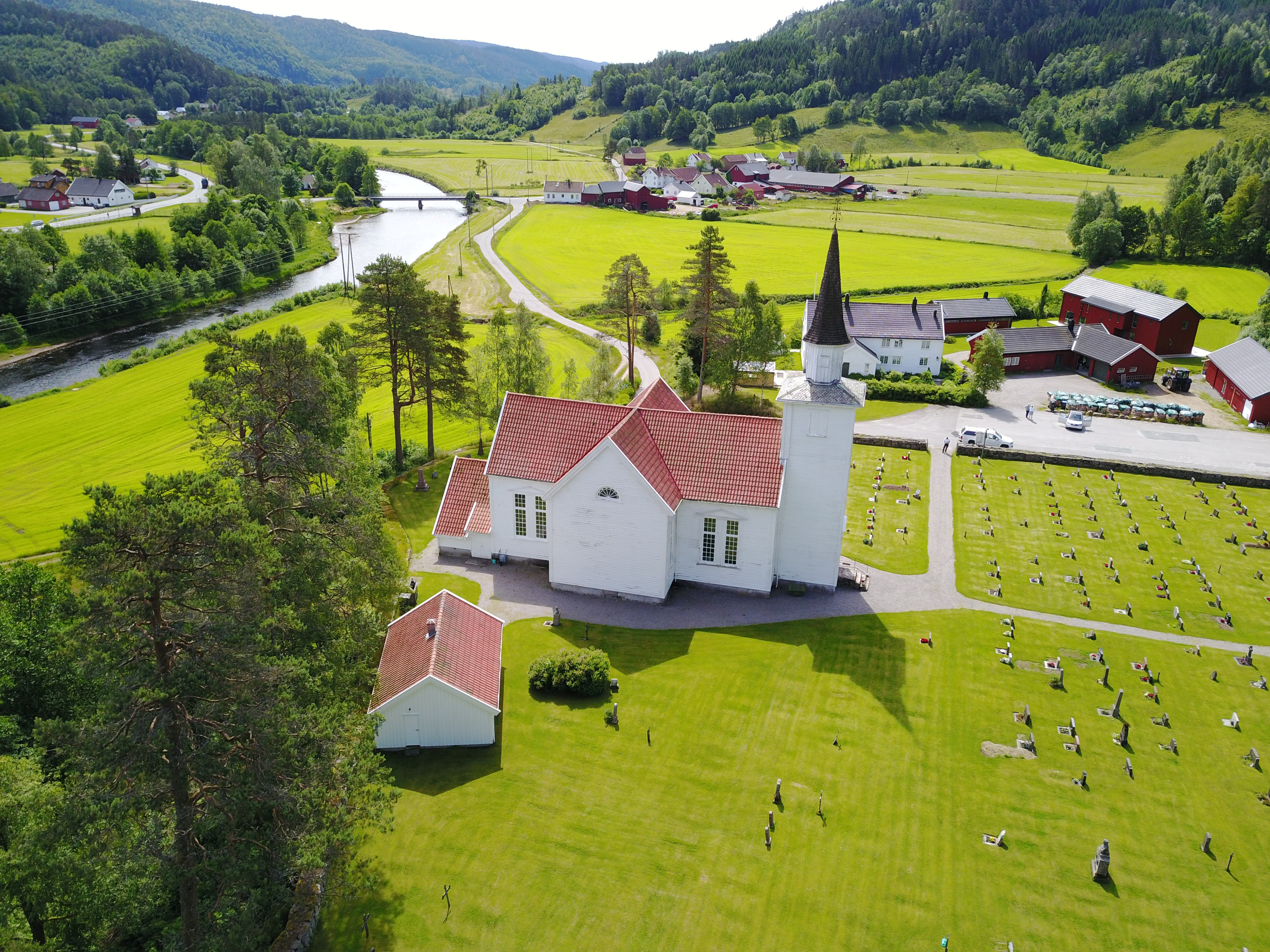
- View of the church
- Vigmostad Church
- 58.20261°N 07.334003°E
- Location: Lindesnes Municipality, Agder
- Country: Norway
- Denomination: Church of Norway
- Previous denomination: Catholic Church
- Churchmanship: Evangelical Lutheran

History
- Status: Parish church
- Founded: 13th century
- Consecrated: 1848

Architecture
- Functional status: Active
- Architect(s): Hans Linstow and Nils Jensson Lassen
- Architectural type: Cruciform
- Completed: 1848 (178 years ago)

Specifications
- Capacity: 400
- Materials: Wood

Administration
- Diocese: Agder og Telemark
- Deanery: Lister og Mandal prosti
- Parish: Lindesnes
- Norwegian Cultural Heritage Site
- Type: Church
- Status: Automatically protected
- ID: 85831

Vigmostad Church (Norwegian: Vigmostad kirke) is a parish church of the Church of Norway in Lindesnes Municipality in Agder county, Norway. It is located in the village of Vigmostad. It is one of the churches for the Lindesnes parish which is part of the Lister og Mandal prosti (deanery) in the Diocese of Agder og Telemark. The white, wooden church was built in a cruciform design in 1848 by the parish priest Nils Jensson Lassen using plans by the famous Norwegian architect Hans Linstow. The church seats about 400 people.

== History ==
The earliest existing historical records of the church date back to the year 1369, but it was not new that year. The first church building here was likely a stave church. In 1781, the old church was torn down and replaced with a new timber-framed building. In 1848, a new church was built immediately to the north of the old building. After the new building was completed, the old church was torn down.

In 1814, this church served as an election church (Norwegian: valgkirke). Together with more than 300 other parish churches across Norway, it was a polling station for elections to the 1814 Norwegian Constituent Assembly which wrote the Constitution of Norway. This was Norway's first national elections. Each church parish was a constituency that elected people called "electors" who later met together in each county to elect the representatives for the assembly that was to meet at Eidsvoll Manor later that year.

== Media gallery ==
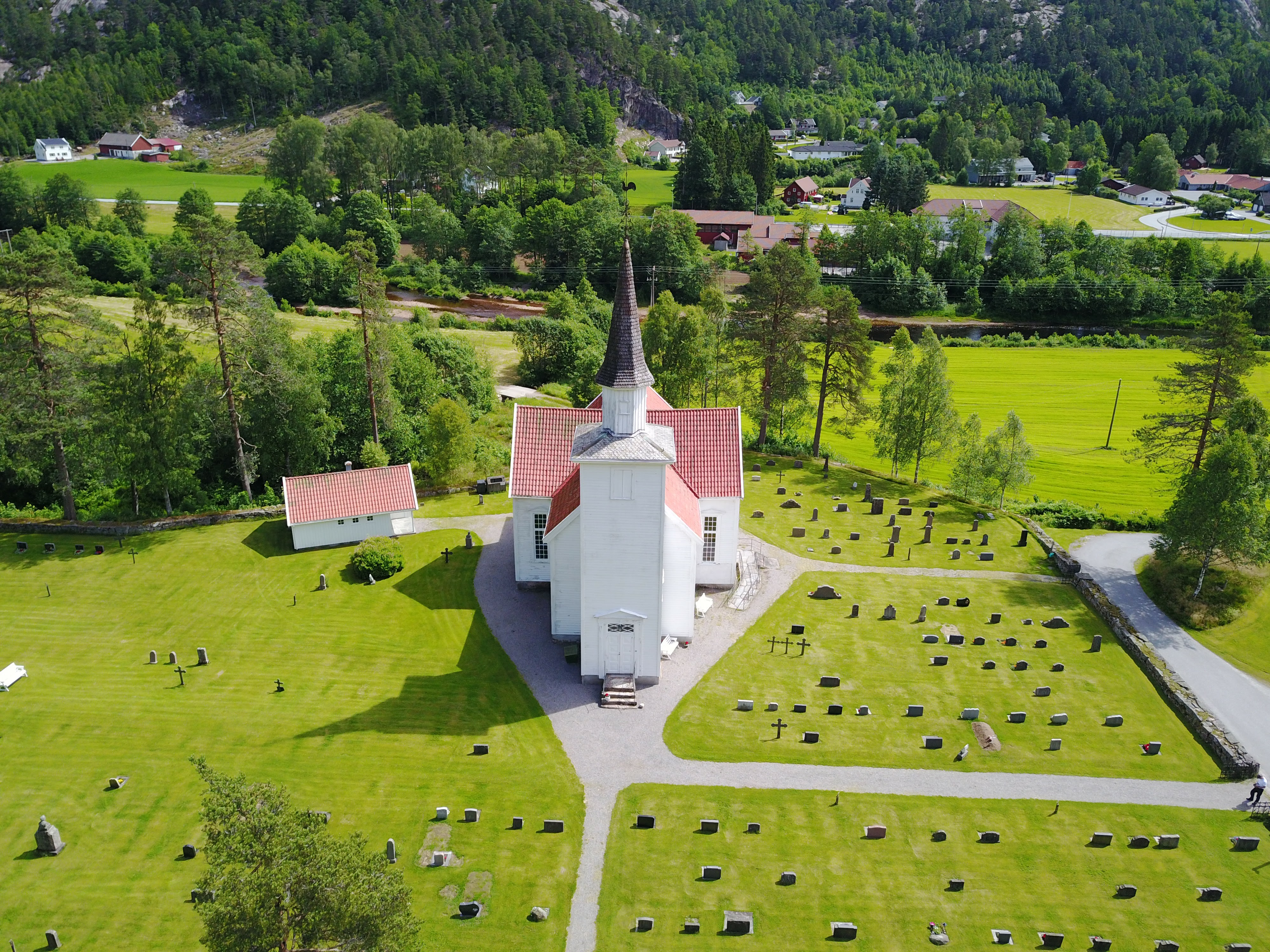

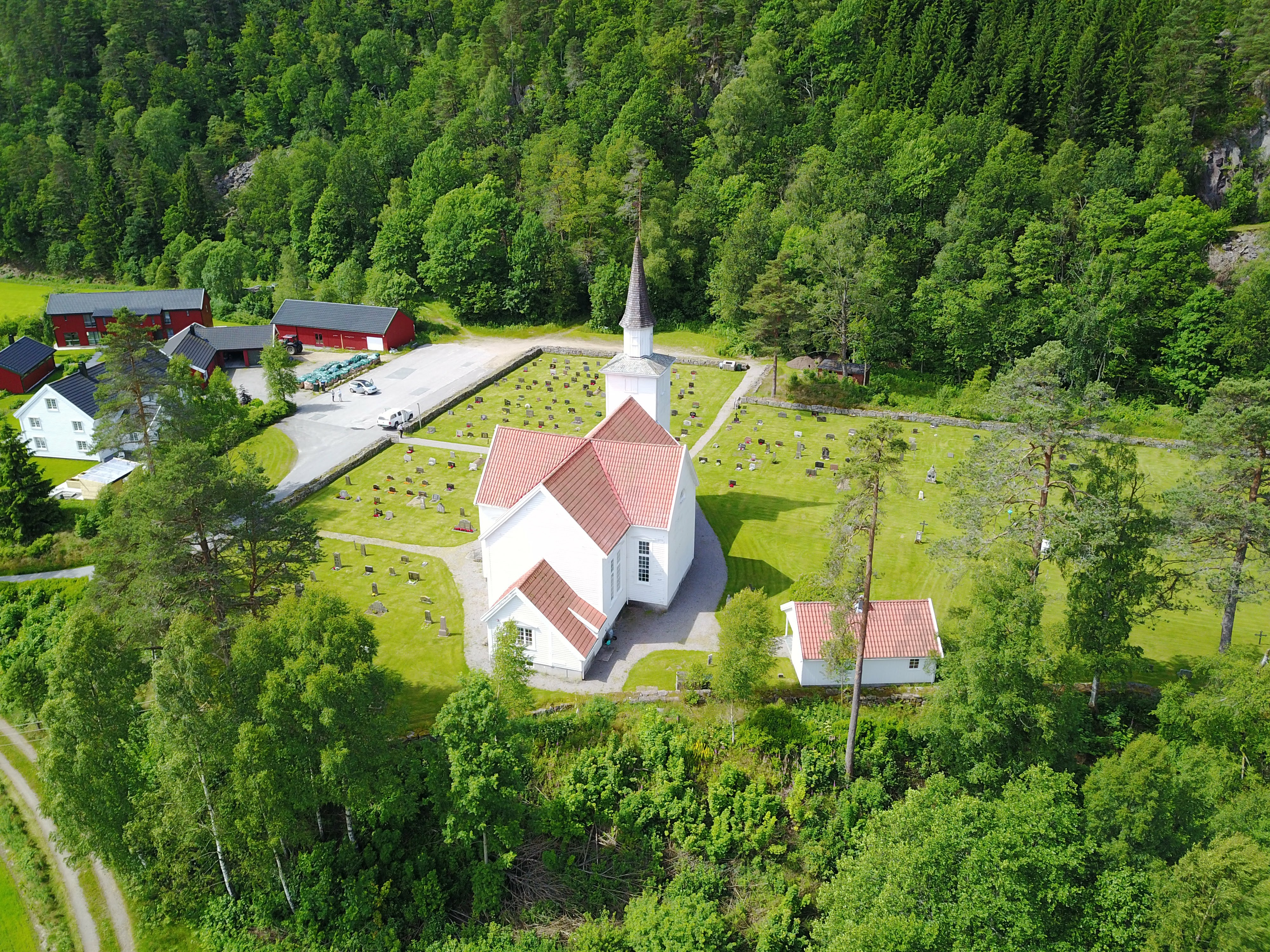

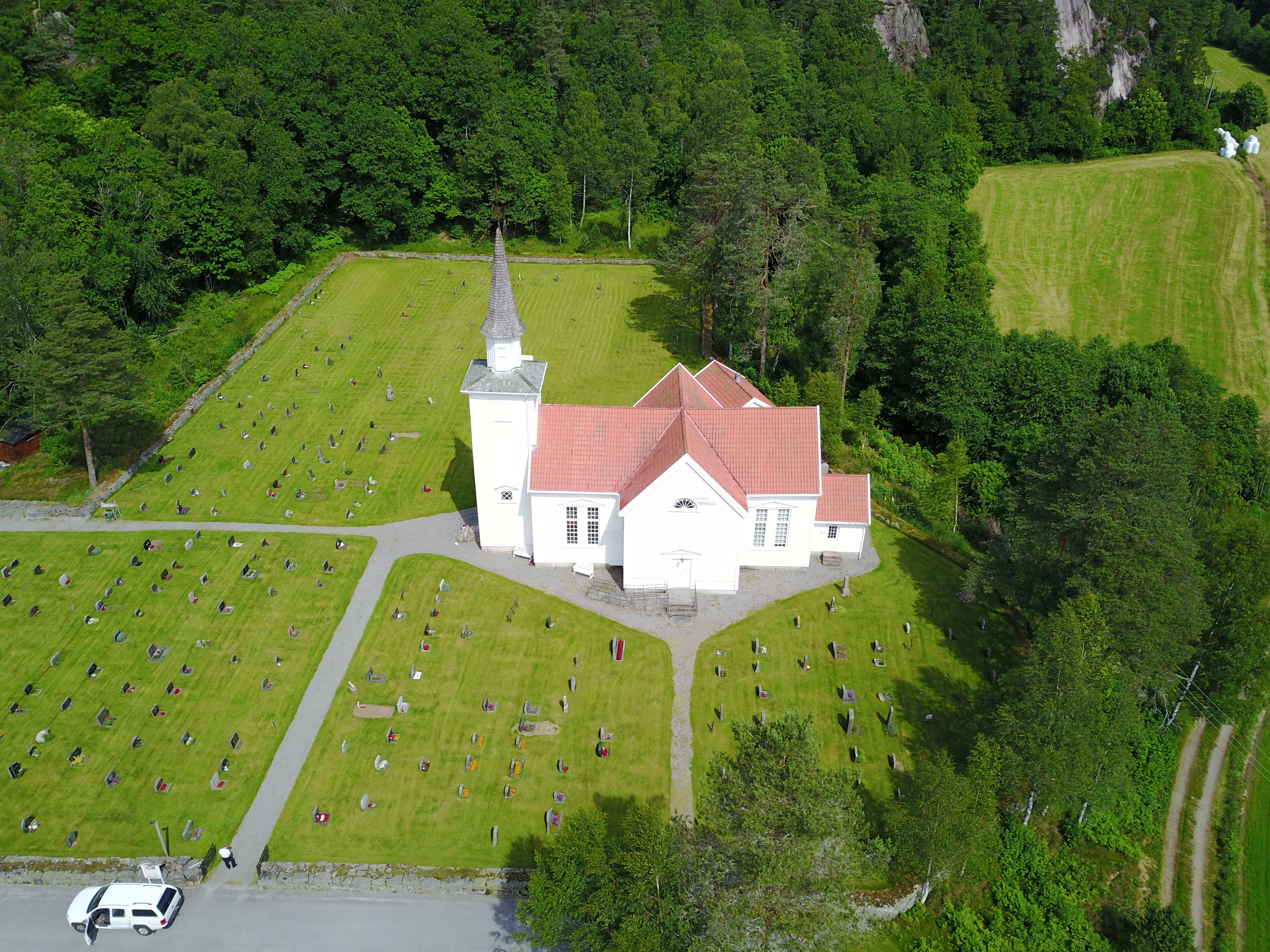

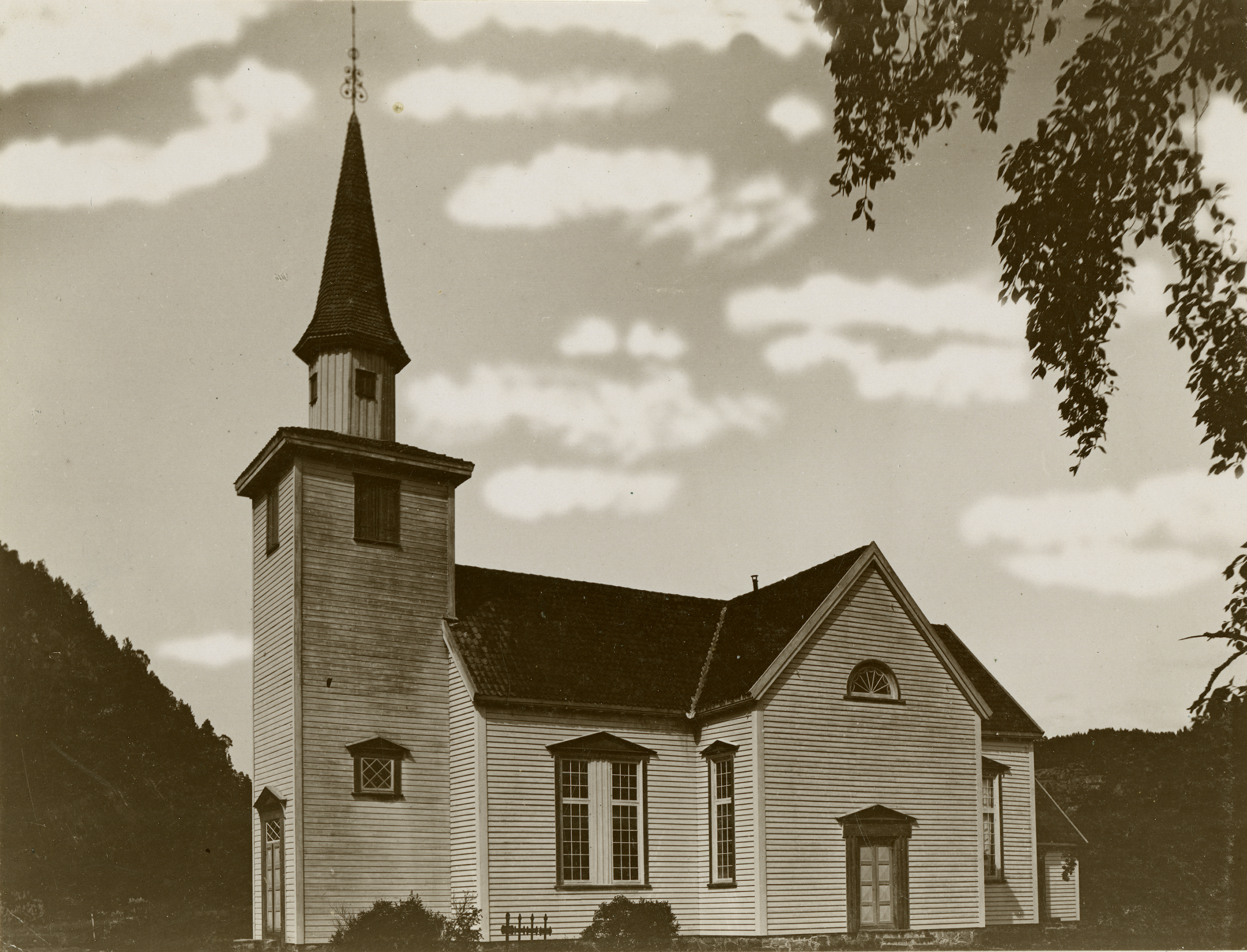

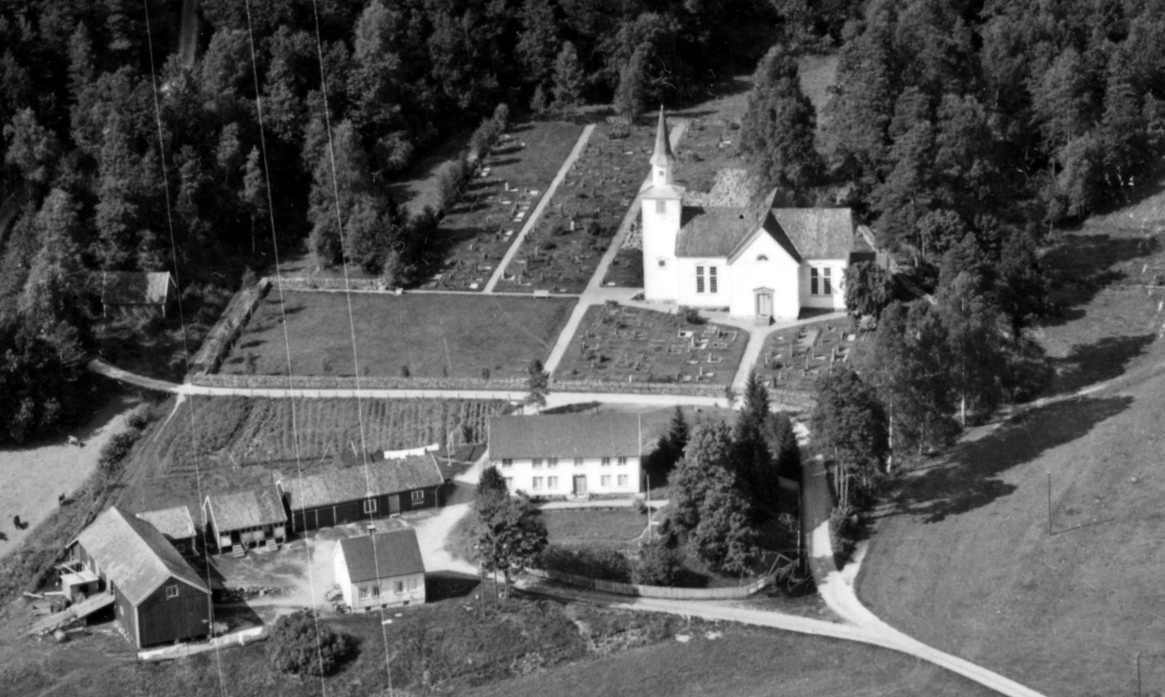

== See also ==
- List of churches in Agder og Telemark
