= Hans Geelmuyden =

Norwegian astronomer

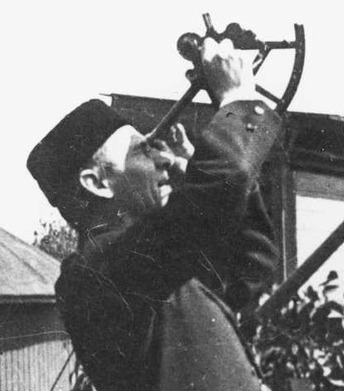
- Born: 10 January 1844; Stavern, Norway
- Died: 1 May 1920 (aged 76)

Academic work
- Discipline: astronomy
- Institutions: University of Kristiania

Hans Geelmuyden (10 January 1844 – 1 May 1920) was a Norwegian astronomer.

He was born in Stavern. He was a relative of Ivar Christian Sommerschild Geelmuyden and Carl Victor Emanuel Geelmuyden, and the family had migrated from the Dutch Republic during the seventeenth century. Hans Geelmuyden was a grandfather of the writer of the same name.

From 1890 to 1919 Hans Geelmuyden was a professor of astronomy at the University of Kristiania as well as the director of the observatory there. From 1892 to his death he edited the official Norwegian almanac. In all three positions he was succeeded by Jens Fredrik Schroeter.
