= Niels Wulfsberg =

Norwegian priest, newspaper editor and publisher (1775–1852)

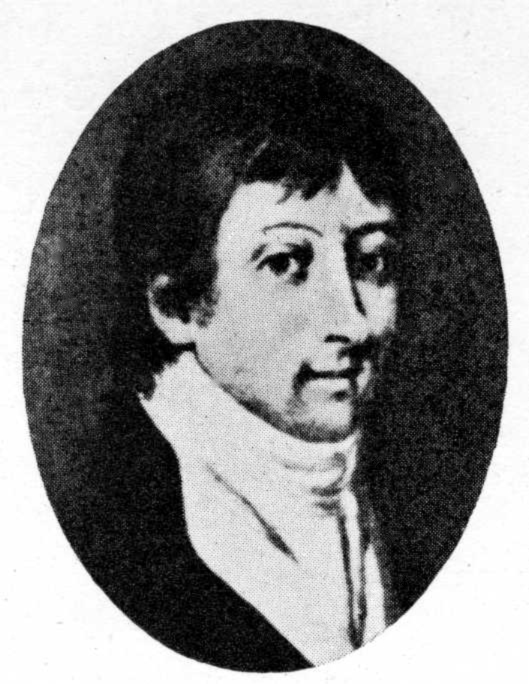
Niels Wulfsberg

Niels Wulfsberg (29 August 1775 – 25 June 1852) was a Norwegian priest, newspaper editor and publisher. Born in Tønsberg, the son of a bailiff, he gained little respect as a priest in Christiania, owing to his libidinous lifestyle. He became known as the founding editor of the Morgenbladet and Tiden newspapers, in which he espoused a monarchistic and secessionist stance.

== Biography ==
Wulfsberg was born in Tønsberg, Vestfold, the son of Jacob Wulfsberg (1751–1826), merchant, bailiff, police chief and circuit judge, and his wife, Inger Helvig, née Seeberg (1752–97). Growing up in Aamot in Hedmark county, he passed his university entrance examination, the examen artium, in 1796. After having studied theology in Copenhagen, he arrived in Christiania in 1801, where he was appointed third priest of Our Savior's Church. He lived a dissolute life together with his wife in the centre of Christiania; a bishop once said that Wulfsberg had a "boisterous and crapulous character he daily soars into, whereby he debases himself as a man". With reducing reverence in the biblical community, he decided to open a bookstore and a printing-house in the city. In the autumn of 1807, he published 43 issues of the military periodical Efterretninger og Opmuntringer angaaende de nærværende Krigsbegivenheder ("News and Incentives relating to the Present War Events"), which has been considered a forerunner of the newspaper Tiden, et offentlig Blad af blandet Indhold ("Time, a Public Newspaper of Mixed Content"). The latter newspaper was first published on 28 January 1808, and championed secession from Denmark, either maintaining Norwegian independence with support from England, or creating a personal union with Sweden. In 1811, Wulfsberg took the initiative to establish Selskabet for Christiania Byes Vel, a heritage association for Christiania.

Before being installed as archivist in the Norwegian council department in Stockholm, Wulfsberg published three issues of a periodical titled Journal for Rigsforfatning, Lovgivning og Politie ("Journal of National Constitution, Legislation and Policy"), to stimulate the debate surrounding the 1814 Constitution. The Tiden newspaper had ceased publication in 1814, owing to a shortage of funds. Whilst still in Sweden, Wulfsberg and Christian Døderlein started a Swedish-friendly paper under the title Den norske Rigstidende ("The Norwegian National Gazette"), which later has been assessed as a sequel to Tiden. On his return from Stockholm, he established the Morgenbladet newspaper. This newspaper offered readers reports from the parliament, domestic and foreign news, as well as literary criticism. In 1823, Wulfsberg fell ill and was obliged to convalesce in Drammen. There, he republished the Tiden newspaper together with his son Jacob Wulfsberg (1809–82); the newspaper is still published as Drammens Tidende. He died in the city on 25 June 1852, at age 76.
