= Morgenbladet =

Norwegian newspaper

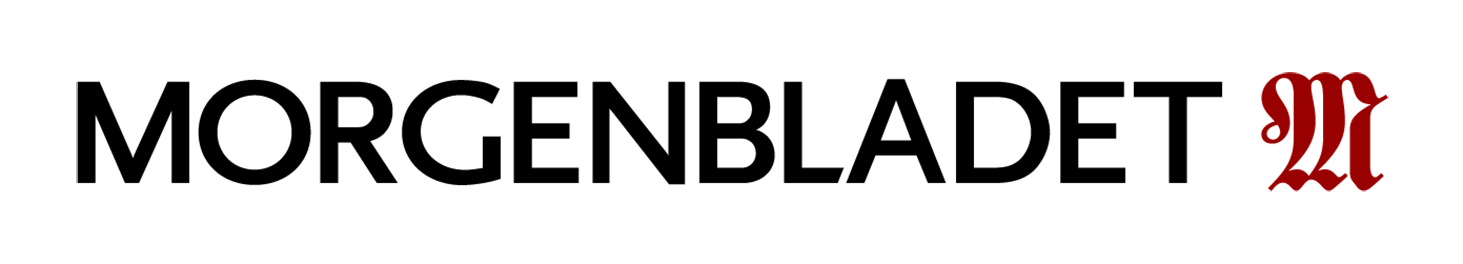
- Type: Newspaper
- Format: Compact (Tabloid)
- Owner(s): Mentor Medier (99,8%); Others (0,2%)
- Editor: Sun Heidi Sæbø
- Founded: 1819
- Political alignment: None
- Language: Norwegian
- Headquarters: Oslo, Norway
- Circulation: 32,313 (2022)
- Website: www.morgenbladet.no

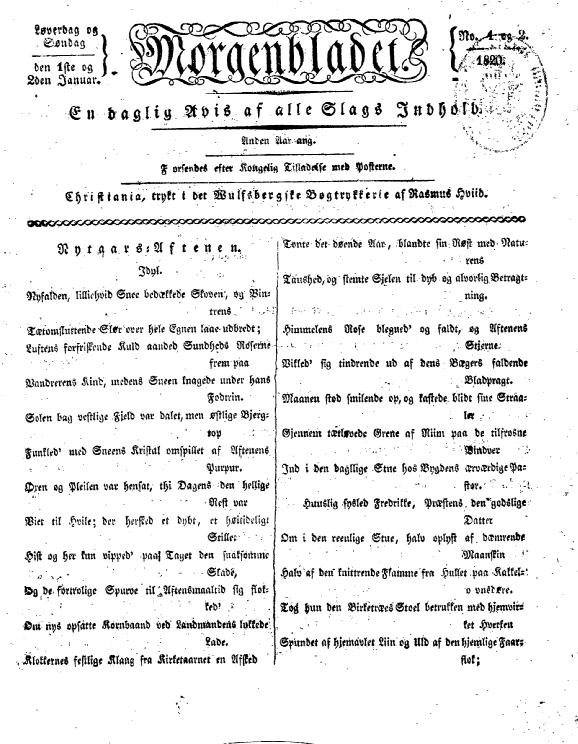
Morgenbladet front page of 2 January 1820

Morgenbladet is Norway's oldest daily newspaper, covering politics, culture and science, now a weekly news magazine primarily directed at well-educated readers. The magazine is notable for its opinion section featuring contributions exclusively from Norwegian academics and other intellectuals.

== Current profile ==
On its front page, Morgenbladet describes itself as "an independent newspaper about politics, culture and academics". It has been described as similar in character to the German Die Zeit and Danish Weekendavisen.

Its target demographic is the well educated and culture-oriented, with 68% of readers having more than four years of university or college education. The newspaper aims to be "a meeting place for ideas, a room for reflection and debate, and a place for the long thoughts that are a necessary part of a critical, public debate, but that falls outside of the rhythm of daily newspapers and online outlets". The newspaper is divided into four major sections: current events, ideas, culture and books.

It was the first major news website in Norway to make the switch to encrypted-only access, through HTTPS.

European Newspaper Award named it weekly newspaper of the year for 2018, the jury commending its "unmistakable profile content- and designwise".

The newspaper receives some economic support from the Norwegian Government.

== History ==
Morgenbladet was founded in 1819 by the book printer Niels Wulfsberg. The paper is the country's first daily newspaper; however, Adresseavisen was founded earlier. For a long time, Morgenbladet was also the country's top-ranking newspaper by circulation. Adolf Bredo Stabell, chief editor from 1831 to 1857, made Morgenbladet an important force of opposition, both in politics and literature. Among its writers during this period was the author Henrik Wergeland.

The leadership of Christian Friele, from 1857 to 1893, turned Morgenbladet into the leading conservative news outlet in Norway. It was read by most people of authority and became the newspaper of high-ranking bureaucrats. It was soon challenged by new competition: Aftenposten (1860), catering to the merchant class, and Verdens Gang (1868) and Dagbladet (1869), representing opposition to the ruling classes.

Connections to the conservative party grew even stronger after the turn of the century. C. J. Hambro, who later went on to be chairman of the Conservative party for eight years and president of the Storting for eighteen years, was editor of Morgenbladet from 1913 to 1919.

After resisting the directions imposed by the occupants during World War II, its chief editor Olaf Gjerløw and news editor Fredrik Ramm were arrested by the Germans in 1941. When the new chief editor Rolv Werner Erichsen was sent to the Grini detention camp by the German occupying force in 1943, the newspaper was discontinued for the remainder of the war.

After the war Morgenbladet struggled to survive, partly because it refused to give in to commercialism and carry ads. The conservative and libertarian business organisation Libertas owned the newspaper from 1983 to 1987. It was relaunched as an independent commentary newspaper in 1987 under editor Hans Geelmuyden, who resigned along with most of the editorial staff after numerous conflicts with the owner Hroar Hansen. From 1988 on, Hansen aligned the newspaper with the Norwegian Progress Party.

This era came to an end in 1993, when Morgenbladet was bought by Truls Lie. Lie turned the newspaper back into a broadsheet weekly newspaper, now more highbrow in tone, with emphasis on culture, art, literature and anti-neoliberal politics, in the style of French monthly newspaper Le Monde diplomatique.

In 2003 ownership once again changed, when the newspaper was bought by Fritt Ord (a free speech foundation), Forlagskonsult AS/Bjørn Smith-Simonsen and Dagsavisen. Alf van der Hagen became publisher, and the newspaper reintroduced the tabloid format. Anna B. Jenssen replaced van der Hagen as publisher in September 2012.

During the period 2003 to 2014, the circulation more than trebled, reaching 29,382 in 2014, which makes it the largest weekly newspaper in Norway by circulation, and the ninth largest of all newspapers.

In a string of purchases from 2013 to 2016, NHST Media Group bought more than 90 percent of the shares in Morgenbladet AS. From 2016, Morgenbladet's headquarters are co-located with NHST Media Group and Dagens Næringsliv at Akerselva Atrium.

== Circulation ==
Numbers from the Norwegian Media Businesses' Association, Mediebedriftenes Landsforening.

- 1995: 5,057
- 1999: 5,720
- 2000: 6,021
- 2001: 6,746
- 2002: 7,229
- 2003: 8,255
- 2004: 11,608
- 2005: 13,870
- 2006: 15,720
- 2007: 18,735
- 2008: 21,560
- 2009: 22,808
- 2010: 23,637
- 2011: 26,365
- 2012: 28,605
- 2013: 29,337
- 2014: 29,382
- 2015: 29,046
- 2016: 28,870
- 2017: 28,998
- 2018: 29,090
- 2019: 29,070
- 2020: 27,730
- 2021: 29,750
- 2022: 32,313

== Chief editors ==
- Niels Wulfsberg (1819–1821)
- Rasmus Hviid (1821–1831)
- Adolf Bredo Stabell (1831–1857)
- Christian Friele (1857–1894)
- Nils Vogt (1894–1913)
- C.J. Hambro (1913–1919)
- Olaf Gjerløw (1919–1941, 1945–1949)
- Rolv Werner Erichsen (1941–1943)
- Birger Kildal (1958–1963)
- Christian Christensen (1963–1982)
- Sverre M. Gunnerud (1982–1984)
- Odd Gisholt (1984–1985)
- Paul Einar Vatne (1985–1987)
- Hans Geelmuyden (1987–1988)
- Hroar Hansen (1988–1993)
- Truls Lie (1993–2003)
- Alf van der Hagen (2003–2012)
- Anna Børve Jenssen (2012–2019)
- Sun Heidi Sæbø (2019–)

== See also ==
- List of Norwegian newspapers
