= Spangereid =

Spangereid may refer to:

== Places ==
- Spangereid, Lindesnes, a village in Lindesnes Municipality in Agder county, Norway
- Spangereid Church, a church in Lindesnes Municipality in Agder county, Norway
- Spangereid Municipality, a former municipality in the old Vest-Agder county, Norway
