= Undal Municipality =

Former municipality in Vest-Agder, Norway

Undal Municipality Undal herred
- Former municipality
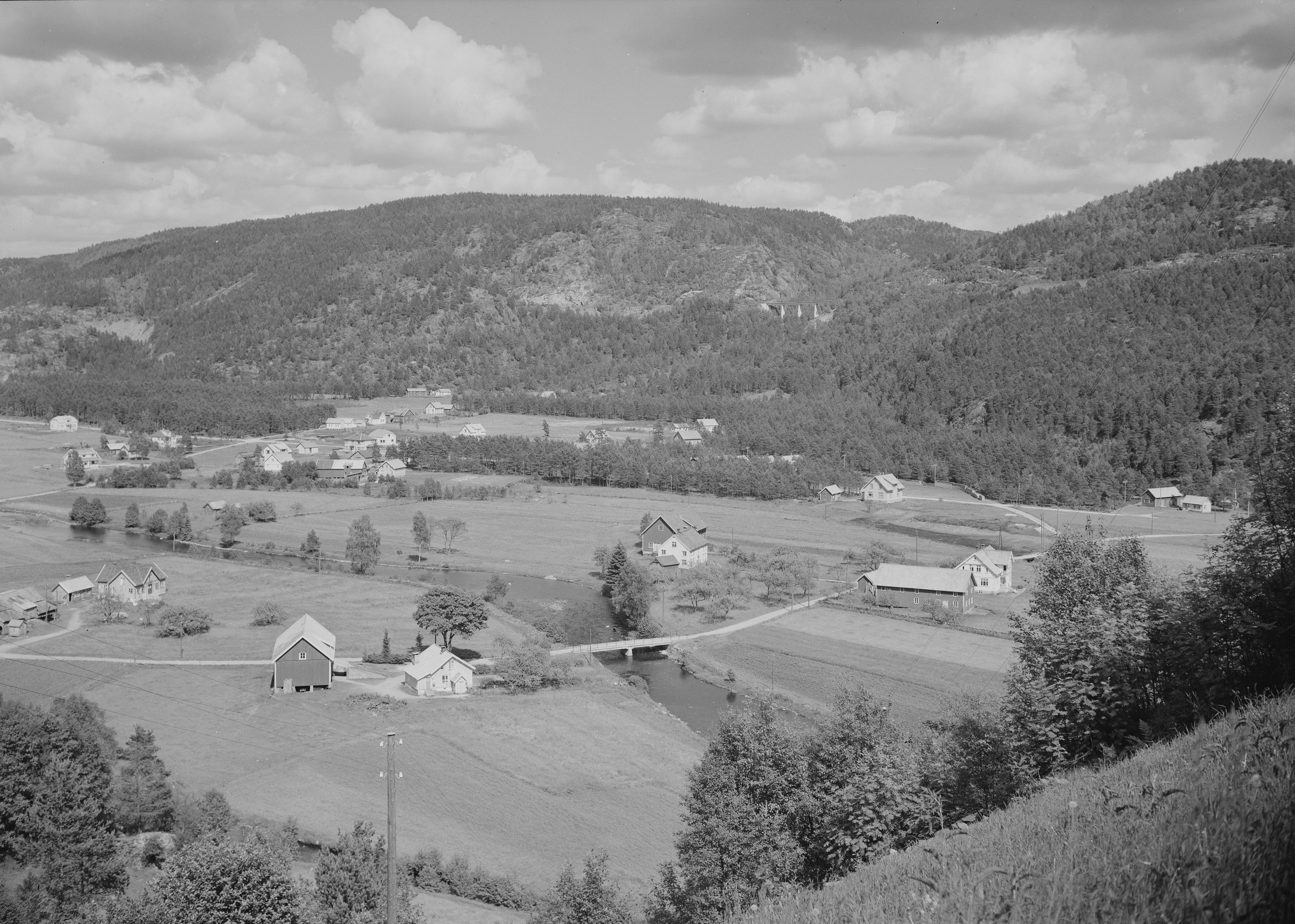
- View of the Undal valley

- Vest-Agder within Norway

- Undal within Vest-Agder
- Coordinates: 58°17′07″N 07°21′21″E
- Country: Norway
- County: Vest-Agder
- District: Sørlandet
- Established: 1 Jan 1838
  - Created as: Formannskapsdistrikt
- Disestablished: 1 Jan 1845
  - Succeeded by: Nordre Undal Municipality and Søndre Undal Municipality
- Administrative centre: Vigeland

Government
  - Mayor (1841–1844): Bertel Person Roland

Area
  - Total: 368 km^{2} (142 sq mi)
- Highest elevation: 517 m (1,696 ft)

Population (1845)
  - Total: 4,695
  - Density: 12.8/km^{2} (33.0/sq mi)
- Time zone: UTC+01:00 (CET)
  - Summer (DST): UTC+02:00 (CEST)
- ISO 3166 code: NO-1027

Undal is a former municipality in the old Vest-Agder county, Norway. The 368-square-kilometre (142 sq mi) municipality existed from 1838 until its dissolution in 1845. The area is now divided between Lindesnes Municipality and Lyngdal Municipality in the traditional district of Lister in Agder county. The administrative centre was the village of Vigeland.

== General information ==
The parish of Undal was established as a municipality on 1 January 1838 (see formannskapsdistrikt law). This municipality was short-lived and only existed for seven years. In 1845 it was split into two new municipalities: the rural northern district (population: 802) became the new Nordre Undal Municipality and the southern district (population: 3,893) became the new Søndre Undal Municipality.

=== Name ===
The municipality (originally the parish) is named after the Audnedalen valley (Old Norse: Auðnudalr), but over time the name was shorted due to a corruption of the language. The first element is the genitive case of the river name Auðna (now Audna). The river name is derived from the word auðn which means "destruction" or "wasteland" (because of the flooding that often happens along the river). The last element is dalr which means "valley" or "dale". The municipality was dissolved in 1848, but the name lived on. In the early 20th century, the name Undal was Norwegianized to Audnedal, bringing back its more original spelling, and in 1964, a new Audnedal Municipality was re-created in this area.

=== Churches ===
The Church of Norway had one parish (sokn) within Undal Municipality. At the time of the municipal dissolution, it was part of the Undal prestegjeld and the Mandal prosti (deanery) in the Diocese of Agder.

Churches in Undal Municipality
Parish (sokn)	Church name	Location of the church	Year built
Undal	Valle Church	Vigeland	1793
Undal	Konsmo Church	Konsmo	1802
Undal	Spangereid Church	Høllen	c. 1140
Undal	Vigmostad Church	Vigmostad	1859

== Geography ==
The municipality encompassed most of the Audnedalen valley which follows the river Audna southwards to the sea. The highest point in the municipality was the 517-metre (1,696 ft) tall mountain Feiåsbergan, on the border with Hægebostad Municipality. Bjelland og Grindum Municipality was located to the north, Øyslebø og Laudal Municipality was located to the east, Holum Municipality was located to the east-southeast, Halse og Harkmark Municipality was located to the southeast, the North Sea was located to the south, Lyngdal Municipality was located to the west, and Hægebostad Municipality was located to the northwest.

== Government ==
While it existed, Undal Municipality was governed by a municipal council of directly elected representatives. The mayor was indirectly elected by a vote of the municipal council. The municipality was under the jurisdiction of the Lyngdal District Court and the Agder Court of Appeal.

=== Mayors ===
The mayor (Norwegian: ordfører) of Undal Municipality was the political leader of the municipality and the chairperson of the municipal council. The following people have held this position:

- 1838–1841: Rev. P.B. Lassen
- 1841–1844: Bertel Person Roland

== See also ==
- List of former municipalities of Norway
