= Peder Claussøn Friis =

Norwegian clergyman and writer

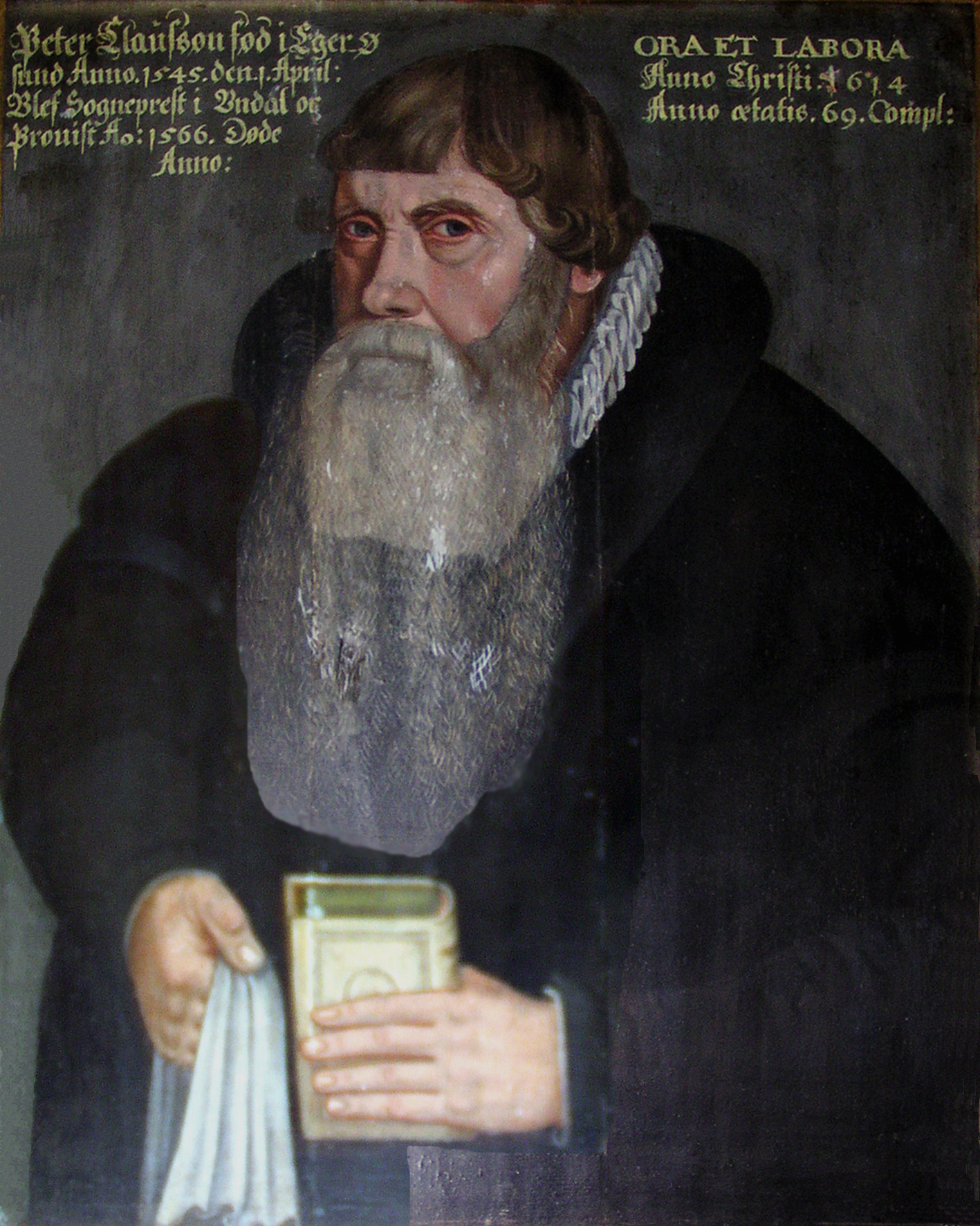
Peder Claussøn Friis

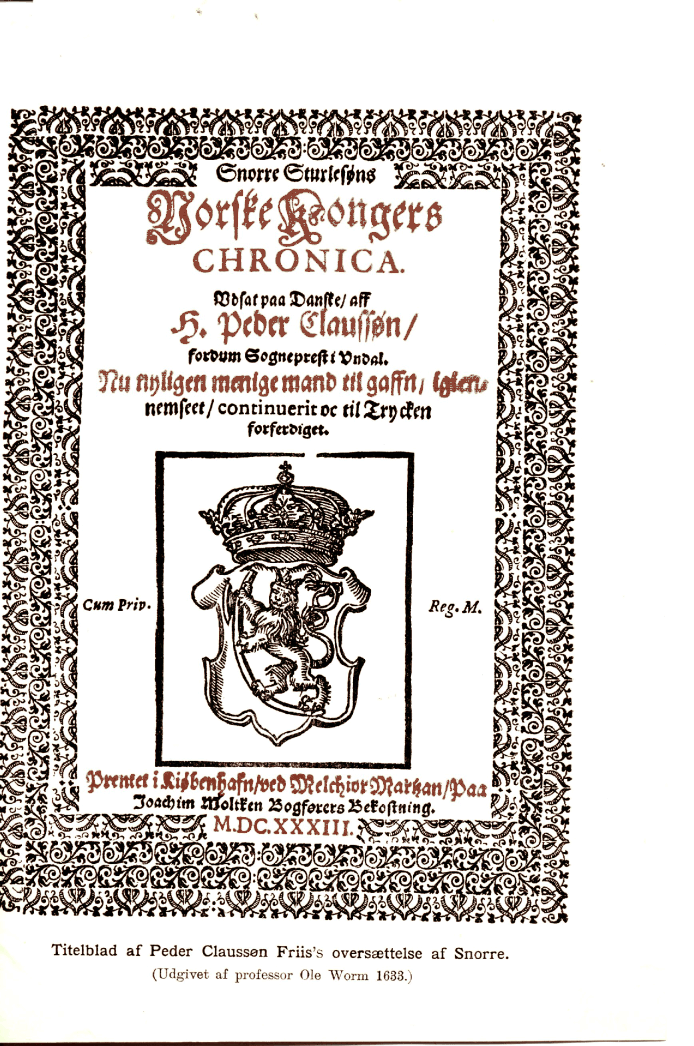
Title page from Peder Claussøn Friis: Norske Kongers Chronica (1633)

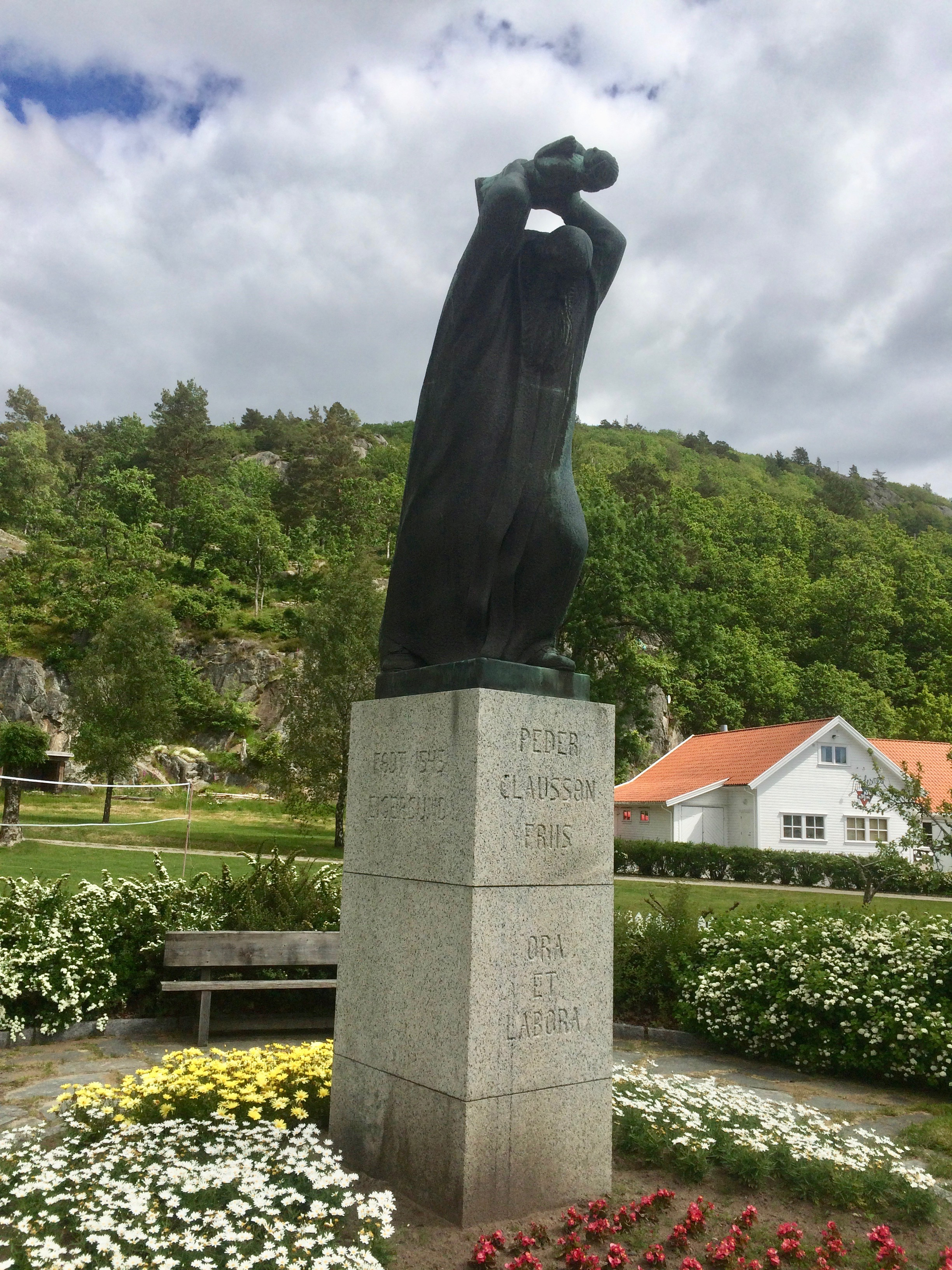
Statue of Peder Claussøn Friis made by Gustav Vigeland

Peder Claussøn Friis (1 April 1545 – 15 October 1614) was a Norwegian clergyman, author and historian. He is most associated with his translation of Snorre Sturlessøns Norske Kongers Chronica.

Peder Claussen Friis grew up in the prestegjeld of Audnedal in Lister og Mandal county, Norway. Dating from about 1550, his father, Claus Friis, had been a minister in the Sør-Audnedal parish (now part of Lindesnes Municipality in western Agder county). Friis received his initial education under the direction of the bishop of Diocese of Stavanger. Friis started his duties as a priest at age 20 as chaplain under his father. When his father died in 1566, Friis took over the position as vicar and was the same year appointed as provost of the Lister prosti (deanery). Sør-Audnedal was a sizable parish, covering the Lindesnes peninsula and the lower part of the Audnedal valley, west of the town of Mandal including Valle Church, Vigmostad Church and Spangereid Church. By 1575, Friis was made a member of the Cathedral chapter in Stavanger. Before 1590, he received the title of archdeacon.

His early writings included descriptions of Iceland (1580), Faroe Islands (1592), Greenland (1596) and Norwegian natural history (1599). In 1599, Axel Gyldenstjerne, Governor-general of Norway, gave him the task of translating Old Norse transcripts, including the Bagler sagas and works by Snorri Sturluson including Norske Kongers Chronica. None of the publications of Peder Claussen were printed while he was alive. The first publication of Norske kongers chronic was printed in Copenhagen during 1632.

Historian Frederik Winkel Horn said of him: "He rendered great services to the history of Norway by his translation of the old sagas of the kings. Like Vedel's, his work is marked by its excellent style. This also applies to his other writings, as for instance his Norriges og omliggende Oers Beskrivelse—a description of Norway and adjacent islands—in which is found historical material of value. His language is remarkably pure and his style is even and artless."

== Primary sources ==
A prime source of information regarding Peder Claussøn Friis can be found in Om Peder Claussøn Friis og hans skrifter by Gustav Storm (1881).
