= Spangereid Municipality =

Former municipality in Vest-Agder, Norway

Spangereid Municipality Spangereid herad
- Former municipality
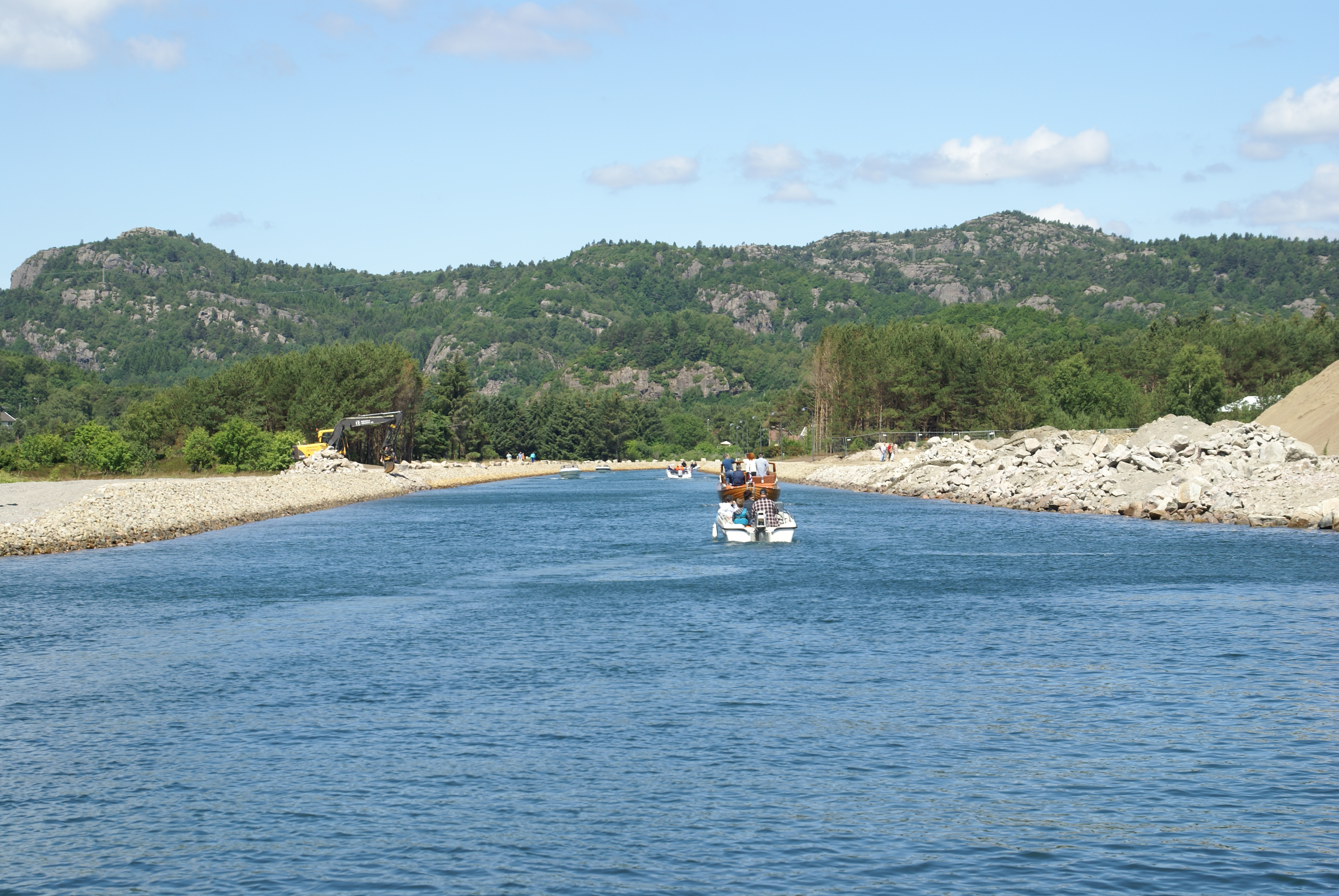
- View of the Spangereid canal

- Vest-Agder within Norway

- Spangereid within Vest-Agder
- Coordinates: 58°02′42″N 07°08′34″E
- Country: Norway
- County: Vest-Agder
- District: Sørlandet
- Established: 1 Jan 1889
  - Preceded by: Søndre Undal Municipality
- Disestablished: 1 Jan 1964
  - Succeeded by: Lindesnes Municipality
- Administrative centre: Høllen

Government
  - Mayor (1960–1963): Abraham Lindland

Area (upon dissolution)
  - Total: 63.1 km^{2} (24.4 sq mi)
  - Rank: #569 in Norway
- Highest elevation: 247 m (810 ft)

Population (1963)
  - Total: 903
  - Rank: #627 in Norway
  - Density: 14.3/km^{2} (37/sq mi)
  - Change (10 years): ▼ −19.4%
- Demonym: Spangereidfolk

Official language
  - Norwegian form: Nynorsk
- Time zone: UTC+01:00 (CET)
  - Summer (DST): UTC+02:00 (CEST)
- ISO 3166 code: NO-1030

Spangereid is a former municipality in the old Vest-Agder county, Norway. The 63.1-square-kilometre (24.4 sq mi) municipality existed from 1889 until its dissolution in 1964. The area is now part of Lindesnes Municipality in Agder county. The administrative centre was the village of Høllen where the Spangereid Church is located.

Prior to its dissolution in 1964, the 63.1-square-kilometre (24.4 sq mi) municipality was the 569th largest by area out of the 689 municipalities in Norway. Spangereid Municipality was the 627th most populous municipality in Norway with a population of about 903. The municipality's population density was 14.3 inhabitants per square kilometre (37/sq mi) and its population had decreased by 19.4% over the previous 10-year period.

The area is one of Norway's richest archaeological sites. The abundant remnants from the Bronze Age and Viking Age show the Spangereid was a very important place at that time. Spangereid is strategically connected at the Lindesnes peninsula, Norway's southernmost point, where the east coast meets the west coast.

== General information ==
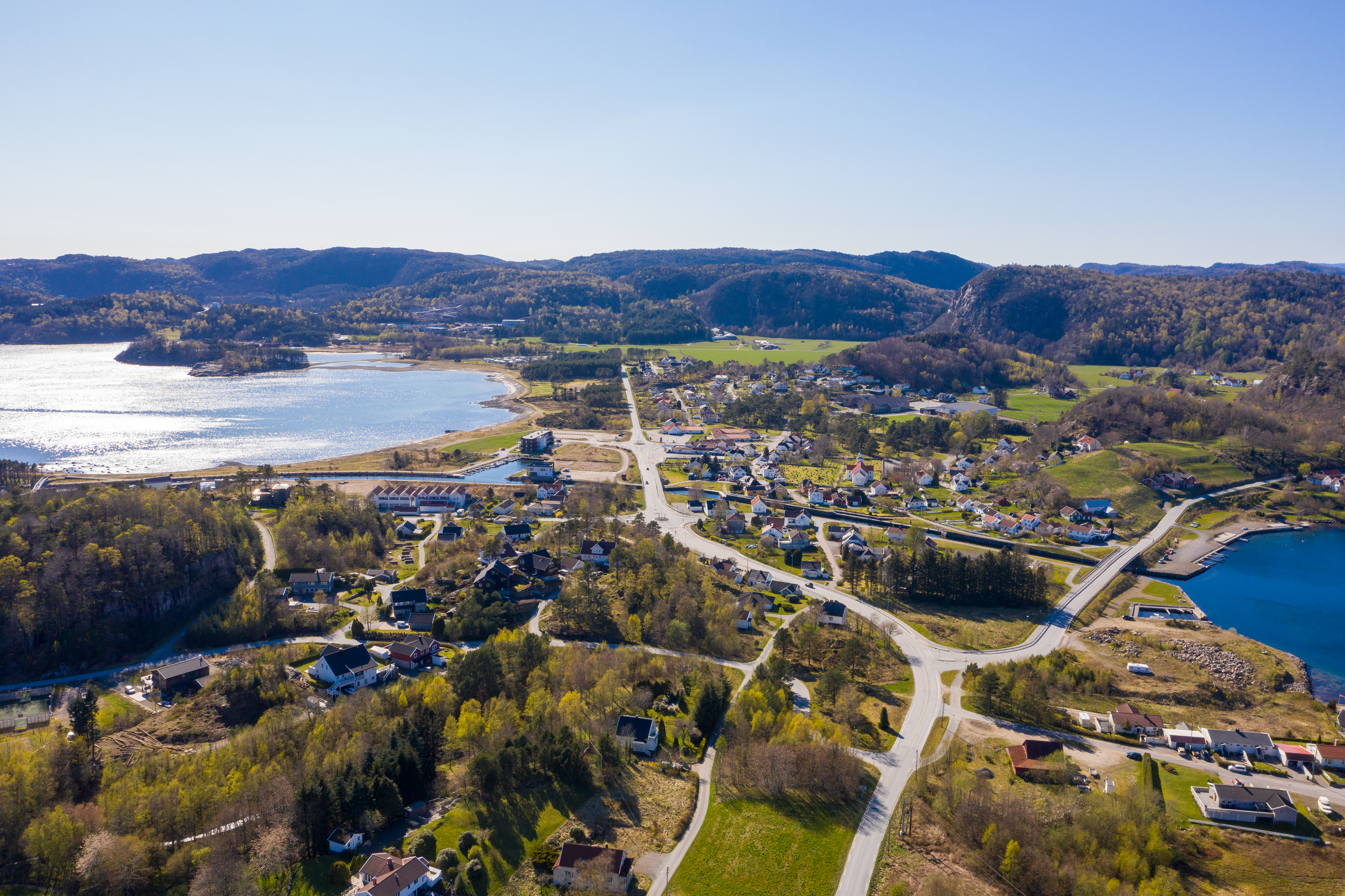
Aerial view of Spangereid

Map of the Spangereid area (Lindesnes peninsula), showing the Spangereid canal

The municipality of Spangereid was established on 1 January 1899 when Søndre Undal Municipality was divided into two: the southwestern district (population: 1,734) became the new Spangereid Municipality and the northeastern district (population: 2,958) continued as a smaller Søndre Undal Municipality.

During the 1960s, there were many municipal mergers across Norway due to the work of the Schei Committee. On 1 January 1963, the Gitlevåg area (population: 103) of Spangereid Municipality was transferred to the neighboring Lyngdal Municipality (this was the only part of the municipality that was located across the Grønsfjorden). On 1 January 1964, Spangereid Municipality was dissolved and the following areas were merged to form the new Lindesnes Municipality:

- all of Spangereid Municipality (population: 899)
- all of Sør-Audnedal Municipality (population: 2,323)
- all of Vigmostad Municipality (population: 589)

=== Name ===
The municipality (originally the parish) is named after a local isthmus called Spangereid (Old Norse: Spangarheið) since it connected the mainland to the large Lindesnes peninsula and the local Spangereid Church is located upon it. The first element is spǫng which means "small piece of land". The last element is eið which means "isthmus".

=== Churches ===
The Church of Norway had one parish (sokn) within Spangereid Municipality. At the time of the municipal dissolution, it was part of the Sør-Audnedal prestegjeld and the Mandal prosti (deanery) in the Diocese of Agder.

Churches in Spangereid Municipality
Parish (sokn)	Church name	Location of the church	Year built
Spangereid	Spangereid Church	Høllen	c. 1140

== Geography ==
The municipality included the whole Lindesnes peninsula, plus part of the mainland adjacent to the narrow isthmus which connects the peninsula to the mainland. The highest point in the municipality was the 247-metre (810 ft) tall mountain Bjørnsheia. Lyngdal Municipality was located to the north, Sør-Audnedal Municipality was located to the east, the Skagerrak strait was located to the south, and Austad Municipality was located to the west.

== Government ==
While it existed, Spangereid Municipality was responsible for primary education (through 10th grade), outpatient health services, senior citizen services, welfare and other social services, zoning, economic development, and municipal roads and utilities. The municipality was governed by a municipal council of directly elected representatives. The mayor was indirectly elected by a vote of the municipal council. The municipality was under the jurisdiction of the Mandal District Court and the Agder Court of Appeal.

=== Municipal council ===
The municipal council (Heradsstyre) of Spangereid Municipality was made up of representatives that were elected to four year terms. The tables below show the historical composition of the council by political party.

Spangereid heradsstyre 1959–1963
Party name (in Nynorsk)	Number of representatives
Labour Party (Arbeidarpartiet)	2
Conservative Party (Høgre)	2
Centre Party (Senterpartiet)	4
Liberal Party (Venstre)	5
Total number of members:	13
Note: On 1 January 1964, Spangereid Municipality became part of Lindesnes Municipality.

Spangereid heradsstyre 1955–1959
Party name (in Nynorsk)	Number of representatives
Labour Party (Arbeidarpartiet)	3
Conservative Party (Høgre)	1
Farmers' Party (Bondepartiet)	2
Liberal Party (Venstre)	7
Total number of members:	13

Spangereid heradsstyre 1951–1955
Party name (in Nynorsk)	Number of representatives
Labour Party (Arbeidarpartiet)	2
Conservative Party (Høgre)	1
Liberal Party (Venstre)	7
Local List(s) (Lokale lister)	2
Total number of members:	12

Spangereid heradsstyre 1947–1951
Party name (in Nynorsk)	Number of representatives
Labour Party (Arbeidarpartiet)	3
Conservative Party (Høgre)	2
Joint list of the Liberal Party (Venstre) and the Radical People's Party (Radikale Folkepartiet)	7
Total number of members:	12

Spangereid heradsstyre 1945–1947
Party name (in Nynorsk)	Number of representatives
Labour Party (Arbeidarpartiet)	1
Joint List(s) of Non-Socialist Parties (Borgarlege Felleslister)	4
Local List(s) (Lokale lister)	7
Total number of members:	12

Spangereid heradsstyre 1937–1941*
Party name (in Nynorsk)	Number of representatives
Labour Party (Arbeidarpartiet)	2
Liberal Party (Venstre)	7
Joint List(s) of Non-Socialist Parties (Borgarlege Felleslister)	3
Total number of members:	12
Note: Due to the German occupation of Norway during World War II, no elections were held for new municipal councils until after the war ended in 1945.

=== Mayors ===
The mayor (Nynorsk: ordførar) of Spangereid Municipality was the political leader of the municipality and the chairperson of the municipal council. The following people have held this position:

- 1899–1912: Johannes P. Solaas
- 1913–1918: O.J. Njerve
- 1919–1928: Olav Hansen Svennevik
- 1929–1931: Hans O. Daland (Bp)
- 1932–1934: Leonard Aanensen
- 1935–1937: Helmer Fjeldsgaard
- 1938–1940: August E. Fjeldskaar
- 1940–1944: Leonard Aanensen
- 1944–1945: Julius T. Ramsland
- 1945–1948: Gunnar Gulli (V)
- 1948–1959: Martin Løvdal
- 1960–1963: Abraham Lindland

== Media gallery ==
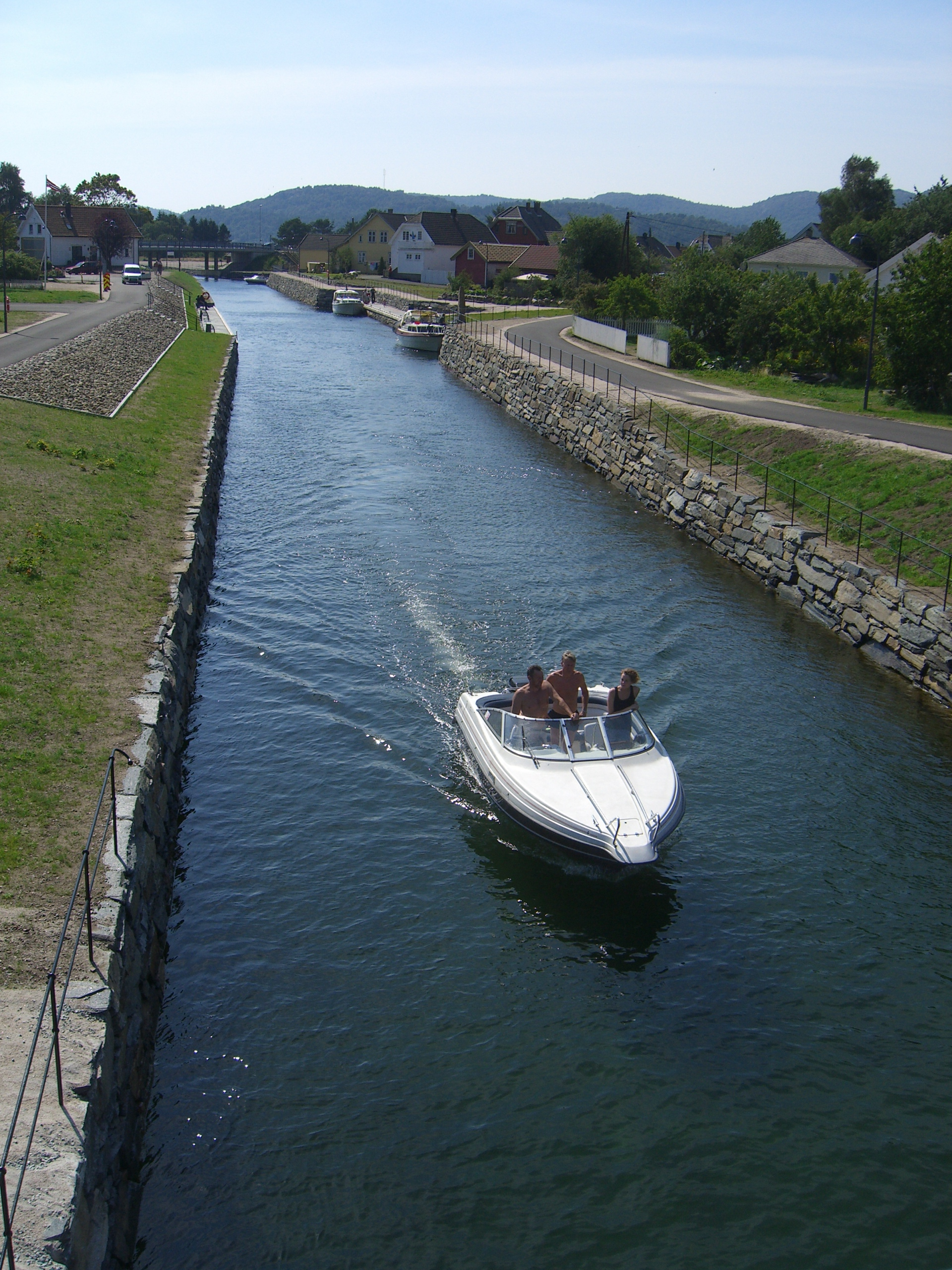
Spangereid Canal

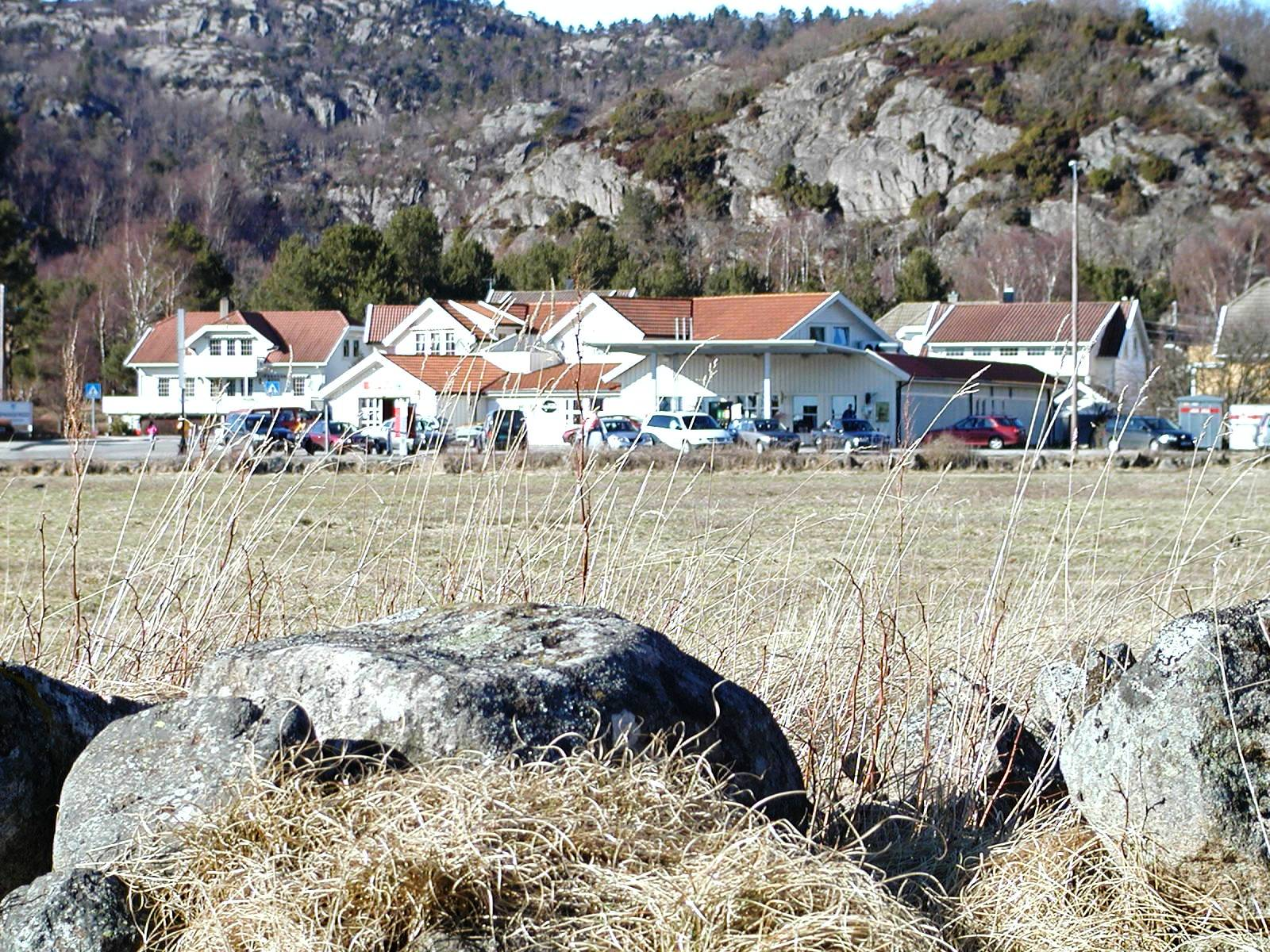
Central part of Høllen

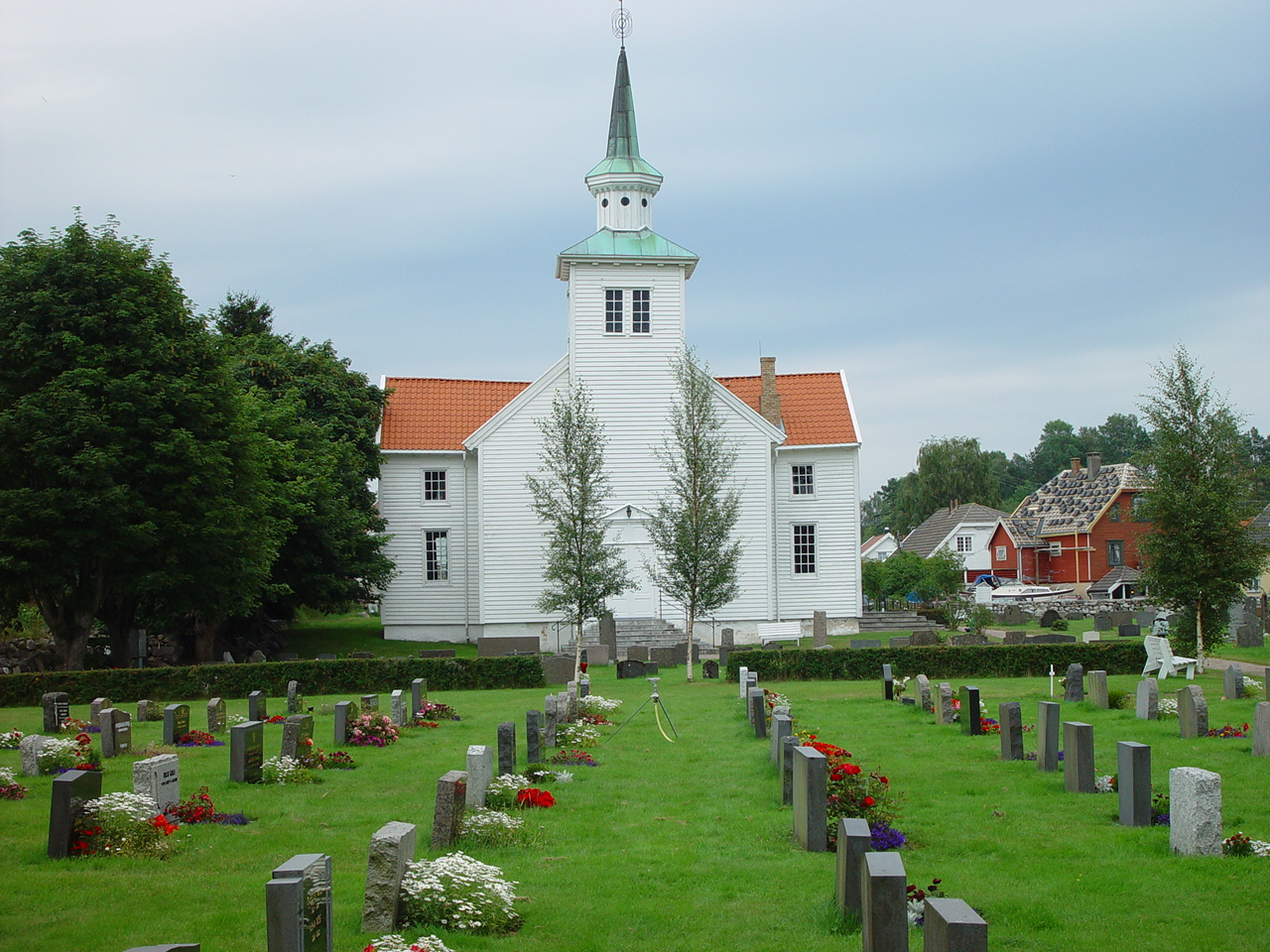
Spangereid Church

== See also ==
- List of former municipalities of Norway
