= Sør-Audnedal Municipality =

Former municipality in Vest-Agder, Norway

Sør-Audnedal Municipality Sør-Audnedal herred
- Former municipality
- Søndre Undal herred (historic name)
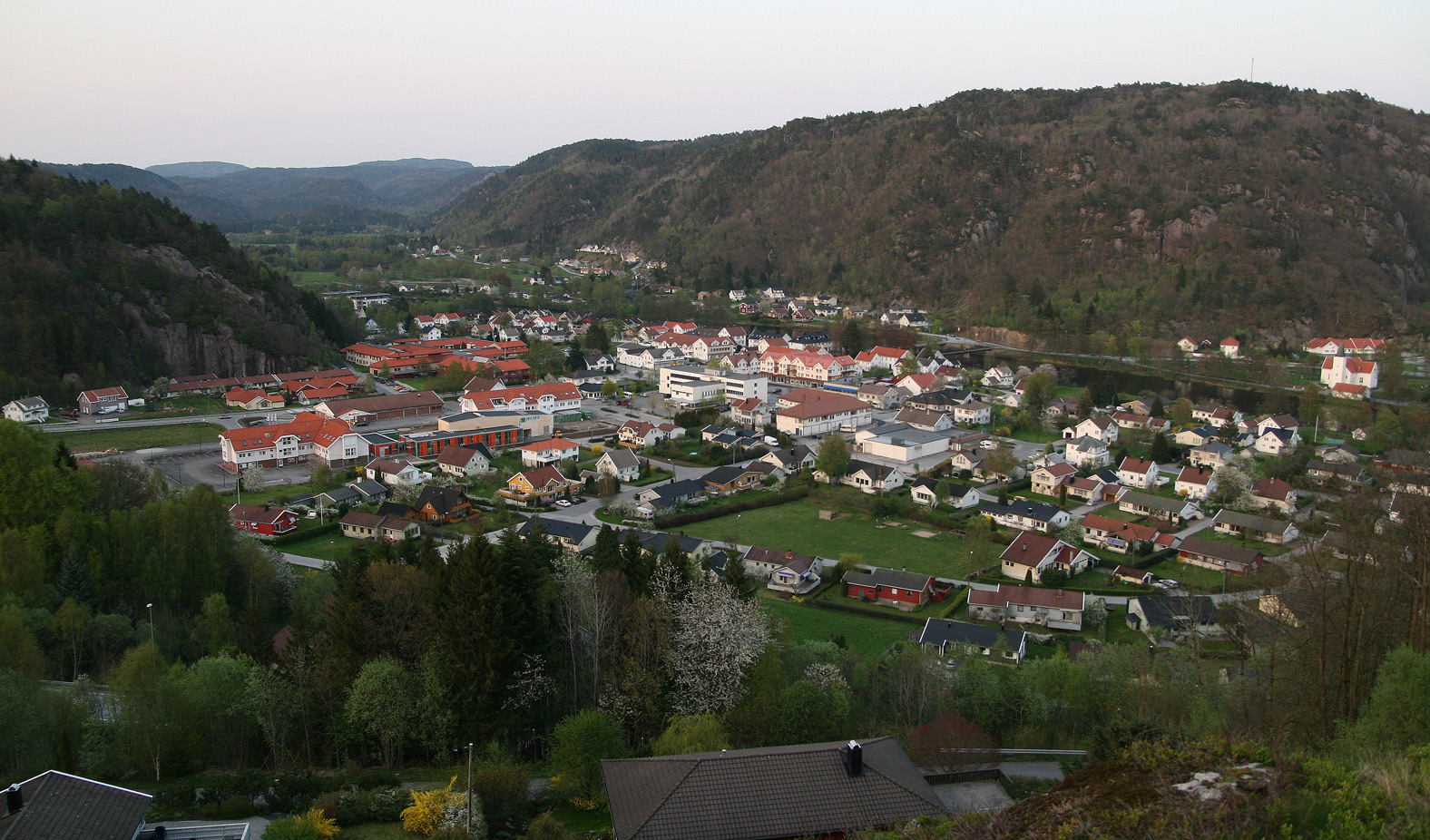
- View of the village of Vigeland

- Vest-Agder within Norway

- Sør-Audnedal within Vest-Agder
- Coordinates: 58°05′03″N 07°18′17″E
- Country: Norway
- County: Vest-Agder
- District: Sørlandet
- Established: 1845
  - Preceded by: Undal Municipality
- Disestablished: 1 Jan 1964
  - Succeeded by: Lindesnes Municipality
- Administrative centre: Vigeland

Government
  - Mayor (1960–1963): August Hoven

Area (upon dissolution)
  - Total: 172 km^{2} (66 sq mi)
  - Rank: #408 in Norway
- Highest elevation: 344.2 m (1,129 ft)

Population (1963)
  - Total: 2,351
  - Rank: #384 in Norway
  - Density: 13.7/km^{2} (35/sq mi)
  - Change (10 years): ▼ −4.7%
- Demonym: Sør-Audnedøl

Official language
  - Norwegian form: Neutral
- Time zone: UTC+01:00 (CET)
  - Summer (DST): UTC+02:00 (CEST)
- ISO 3166 code: NO-1029

Sør-Audnedal (historic: Søndre Undal) is a former municipality in the old Vest-Agder county, Norway. The 172-square-kilometre (66 sq mi) municipality existed from 1845 until its dissolution in 1964. The area is now part of Lindesnes Municipality in Agder county. The administrative centre was the village of Vigeland where Valle Church is located.

Prior to its dissolution in 1964, the 172-square-kilometre (66 sq mi) municipality was the 408th largest by area out of the 689 municipalities in Norway. Sør-Audnedal Municipality was the 384th most populous municipality in Norway with a population of about 2,351. The municipality's population density was 13.7 inhabitants per square kilometre (35/sq mi) and its population had decreased by 4.7% over the previous 10-year period.

== General information ==
The municipality of Søndre Undal (later spelled Sør-Audnedal) was established in 1845 when the old Undal Municipality was divided into two: the southern district (population: 3,893) became the new Søndre Undal Municipality and the northern district (population: 802) became the new Nordre Undal Municipality.

On 1 January 1899, Søndre Undal Municipality was divided as follows: the 63-square-kilometre (24 sq mi) western district (population: 1,734) became the new Spangereid Municipality and the eastern district (population: 2,958) continued as a smaller 171.7-square-kilometre (66.3 sq mi) Søndre Undal Municipality.

During the 1960s, there were many municipal mergers across Norway due to the work of the Schei Committee. On 1 January 1964, Sør-Audnedal Municipality was dissolved and the following areas were merged to form the new Lindesnes Municipality:

- all of Sør-Audnedal Municipality (population: 2,323)
- all of Spangereid Municipality (population: 899)
- all of Vigmostad Municipality (population: 589)

=== Name ===
The municipality (originally the parish) is named after the Audnedalen valley (Old Norse: Auðnudalr). The prefix sør means "southern" since it is the southern part of the valley. The first element of the name is the genitive case of the river name Auðna (now Audna). The river name is derived from the word auðn which means "destruction" or "wasteland" (because of the flooding that often happens along the river). The last element is dalr which means "valley" or "dale".

Historically, the name of the municipality was spelled Søndre Undal (an older version of the valley name that was a shortened and corrupted version of the original Old Norse name). On 3 November 1917, a royal resolution changed the spelling of the name of the municipality to Sør-Audnedal. This more modern name was introduced to bring back the historical spelling of the name.

=== Churches ===
The Church of Norway had one parish (sokn) within Sør-Audnedal Municipality. At the time of the municipal dissolution, it was part of the Sør-Audnedal prestegjeld and the Mandal prosti (deanery) in the Diocese of Agder.

Churches in Sør-Audnedal Municipality
Parish (sokn)	Church name	Location of the church	Year built
Valle	Valle Church	Vigeland	1793

== Geography ==
The municipality was located in the lower Audnedalen valley, through which the river Audna flows. The highest point in the municipality was the 344.2-metre (1,129 ft) tall mountain Eikeråsheia, located along the border with Lyngdal Municipality. Vigmostad Municipality was located to the north, Øyslebø Municipality was located to the northeast, Holum Municipality was located to the east, Halse og Harkmark Municipality was located to the southeast, the Skagerrak strait was located to the south, Spangereid Municipality was located to the southwest, and Lyngdal Municipality was located to the west.

== Government ==
While it existed, Sør-Audnedal Municipality was responsible for primary education (through 10th grade), outpatient health services, senior citizen services, welfare and other social services, zoning, economic development, and municipal roads and utilities. The municipality was governed by a municipal council of directly elected representatives. The mayor was indirectly elected by a vote of the municipal council. The municipality was under the jurisdiction of the Mandal District Court and the Agder Court of Appeal.

=== Municipal council ===
The municipal council (Herredsstyre) of Sør-Audnedal Municipality was made up of representatives that were elected to four year terms. The tables below show the historical composition of the council by political party.

Sør-Audnedal herredsstyre 1959–1963
Party name (in Norwegian)	Number of representatives
Labour Party (Arbeiderpartiet)	4
Conservative Party (Høyre)	2
Christian Democratic Party (Kristelig Folkeparti)	2
Centre Party (Senterpartiet)	4
Liberal Party (Venstre)	5
Total number of members:	17
Note: On 1 January 1964, Sør-Audnedal Municipality became part of Lindesnes Municipality.

Sør-Audnedal herredsstyre 1955–1959
Party name (in Norwegian)	Number of representatives
Labour Party (Arbeiderpartiet)	5
Conservative Party (Høyre)	2
Christian Democratic Party (Kristelig Folkeparti)	2
Farmers' Party (Bondepartiet)	4
Liberal Party (Venstre)	4
Total number of members:	17

Sør-Audnedal herredsstyre 1951–1955
Party name (in Norwegian)	Number of representatives
Labour Party (Arbeiderpartiet)	4
Conservative Party (Høyre)	2
Christian Democratic Party (Kristelig Folkeparti)	3
Farmers' Party (Bondepartiet)	3
Liberal Party (Venstre)	4
Total number of members:	16

Sør-Audnedal herredsstyre 1947–1951
Party name (in Norwegian)	Number of representatives
Labour Party (Arbeiderpartiet)	3
Conservative Party (Høyre)	2
Christian Democratic Party (Kristelig Folkeparti)	2
Farmers' Party (Bondepartiet)	4
Liberal Party (Venstre)	5
Total number of members:	16

Sør-Audnedal herredsstyre 1945–1947
Party name (in Norwegian)	Number of representatives
Labour Party (Arbeiderpartiet)	5
Conservative Party (Høyre)	2
Farmers' Party (Bondepartiet)	3
Joint list of the Liberal Party (Venstre) and the Radical People's Party (Radikale Folkepartiet)	6
Total number of members:	16

Sør-Audnedal herredsstyre 1937–1941*
Party name (in Norwegian)	Number of representatives
Labour Party (Arbeiderpartiet)	4
Conservative Party (Høyre)	3
Farmers' Party (Bondepartiet)	4
Liberal Party (Venstre)	5
Total number of members:	16
Note: Due to the German occupation of Norway during World War II, no elections were held for new municipal councils until after the war ended in 1945.

=== Mayors ===
The mayor (Nynorsk: ordførar) of Sør-Audnedal Municipality was the political leader of the municipality and the chairperson of the municipal council. The following people have held this position:

- 1845–1846: Hans Thronsen Roland
- 1846–1847: Thomas Christensen Sletten
- 1848–1851: Hans Thronsen Roland
- 1852–1855: Aanen Gjetsen Udland
- 1856–1859: Hans Thronsen Roland
- 1860–1871: Aanen Gjetsen Udland
- 1872–1897: Hans Braadland
- 1897–1898: P.E. Tjersland
- 1899–1904: Jens Smith
- 1905–1913: P.E. Tjersland
- 1914–1916: Jens Smith
- 1917–1919: Rev. N.T. Tønnessen
- 1920–1922: T.G. Tørresen
- 1923–1923: G.O. Roland
- 1924–1925: Hans Foss
- 1926–1928: W.O. Skyllingstad
- 1929–1931: Andreas Hoven
- 1932–1934: W.O. Skyllingstad
- 1935–1940: G.O. Roland
- 1940–1945: Arne Opsal
- 1945–1955: Karl Norum
- 1956–1956: Bjarne Finstad
- 1956–1959: Alf Udland
- 1960–1963: August Hoven

== See also ==
- List of former municipalities of Norway
