= Valle Church (Lindesnes) =

Church in Agder, Norway

- Valle kirke
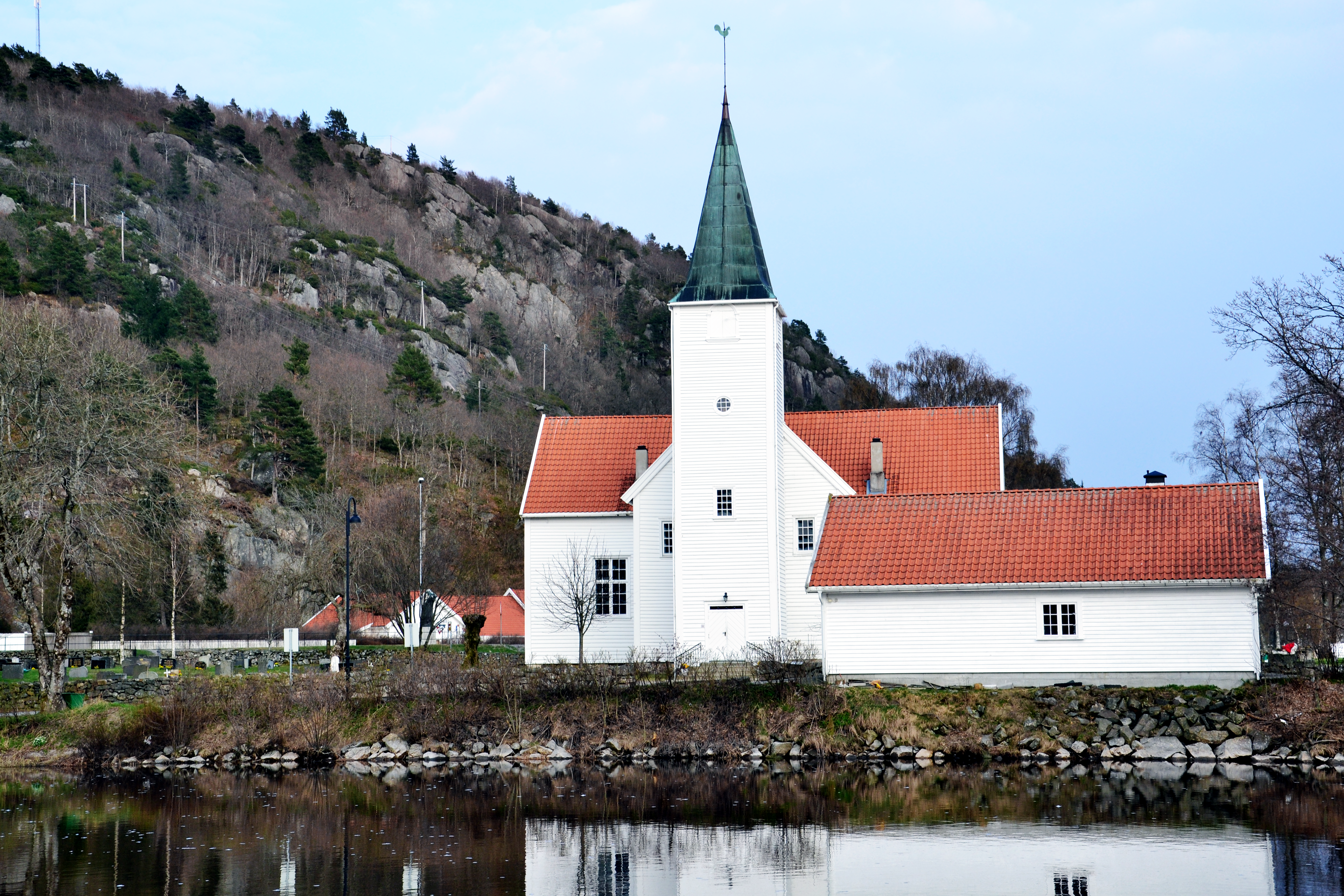
- View of the church
- Valle Church
- 58.081722°N 07.30756°E
- Location: Lindesnes Municipality, Agder
- Country: Norway
- Denomination: Church of Norway
- Previous denomination: Catholic Church
- Churchmanship: Evangelical Lutheran

History
- Status: Parish church
- Founded: 14th century
- Consecrated: 1793

Architecture
- Functional status: Active
- Architect: Prost Saxe
- Architectural type: Cruciform
- Completed: 1793 (233 years ago)

Specifications
- Capacity: 600
- Materials: Wood

Administration
- Diocese: Agder og Telemark
- Deanery: Lister og Mandal prosti
- Parish: Lindesnes
- Norwegian Cultural Heritage Site
- Type: Church
- Status: Not protected
- ID: 85749

Valle Church (Norwegian: Valle kirke) is a parish church of the Church of Norway in Lindesnes Municipality in Agder county, Norway. It is located in the village of Vigeland. It is one of the churches for the Lindesnes parish which is part of the Lister og Mandal prosti (deanery) in the Diocese of Agder og Telemark. The white, wooden church was built in a cruciform design in 1793 using plans drawn up by the local Provost Saxe. The church seats about 600 people.

== History ==
The earliest existing historical records of the church date back to the year 1390, but it was not new that year. The medieval building was likely a stave church, and it was probably located about 60 metres (200 ft) north of the present church site, at the north end of the present church cemetery. In 1577, the local parish priest, Peder Claussøn Friis, built a new church on the same site as the previous church. From 1678-1680, the church was enlarged by adding onto the sides, creating a cruciform design. In 1793, a new church was constructed about 60 metres (200 ft) to the south of the old church. After the new church was completed, the old church was torn down. The new church also had a cruciform design.

In 1814, this church served as an election church (Norwegian: valgkirke). Together with more than 300 other parish churches across Norway, it was a polling station for elections to the 1814 Norwegian Constituent Assembly which wrote the Constitution of Norway. This was Norway's first national elections. Each church parish was a constituency that elected people called "electors" who later met together in each county to elect the representatives for the assembly that was to meet at Eidsvoll Manor later that year.

== Media gallery ==
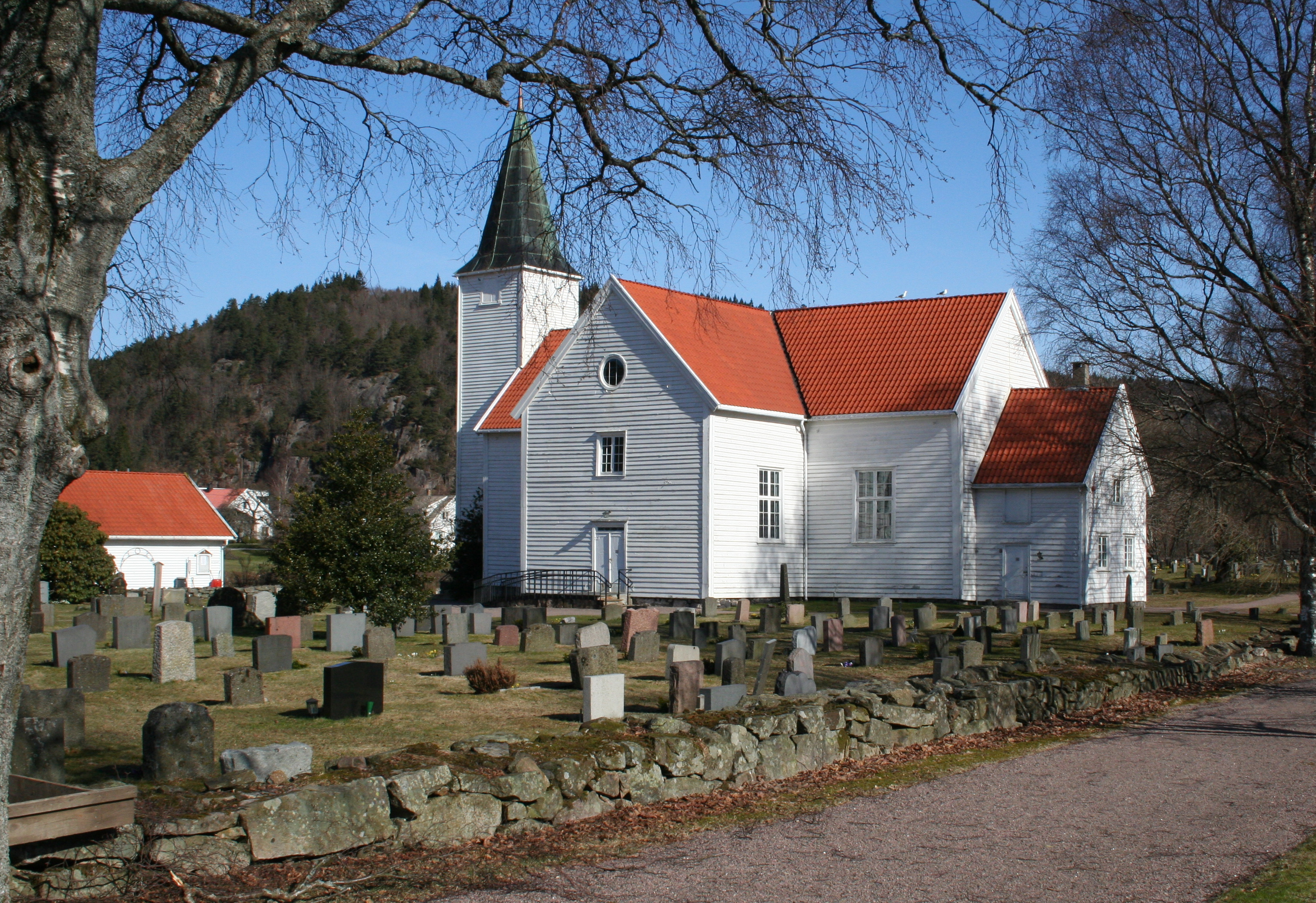

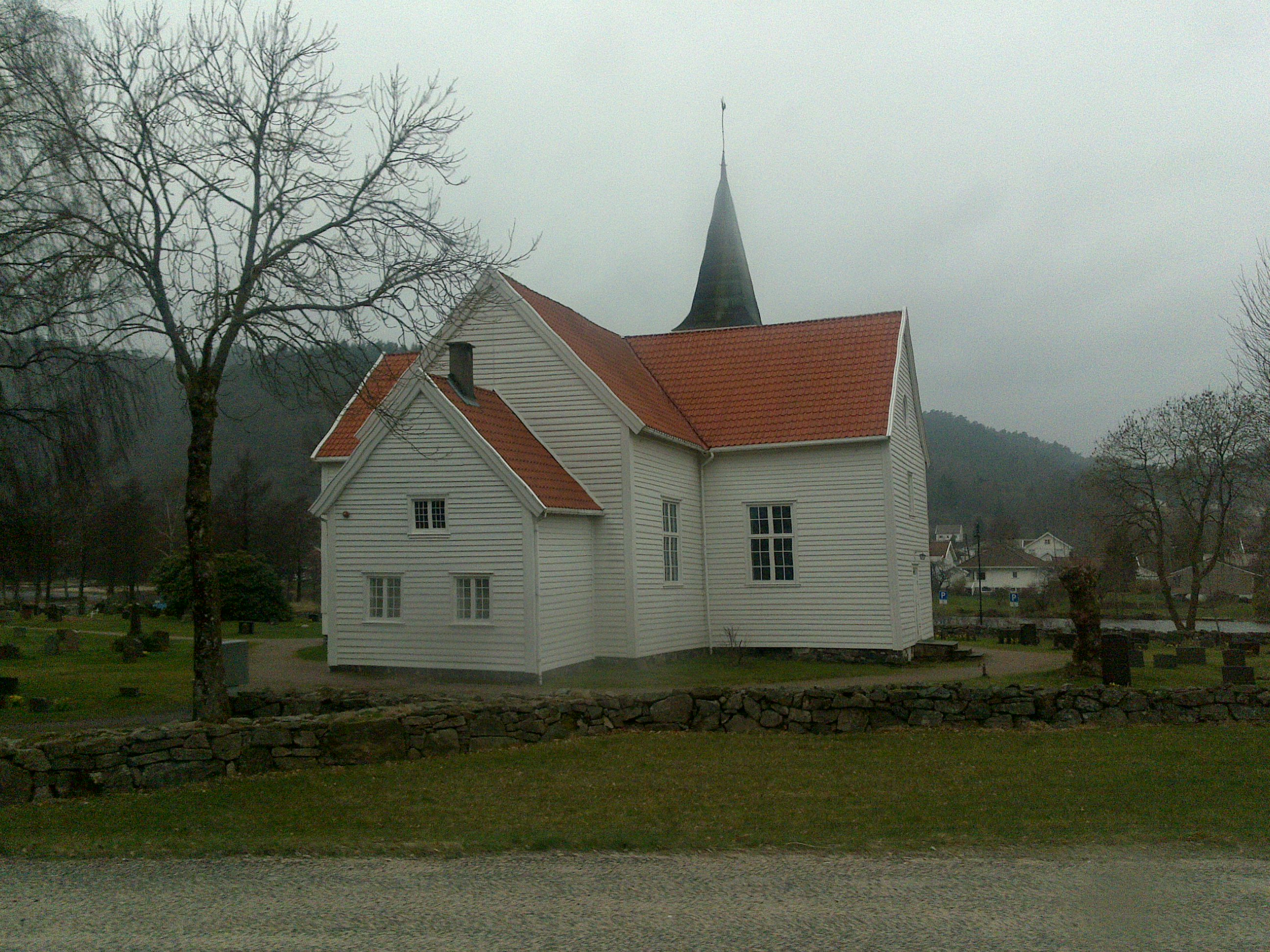

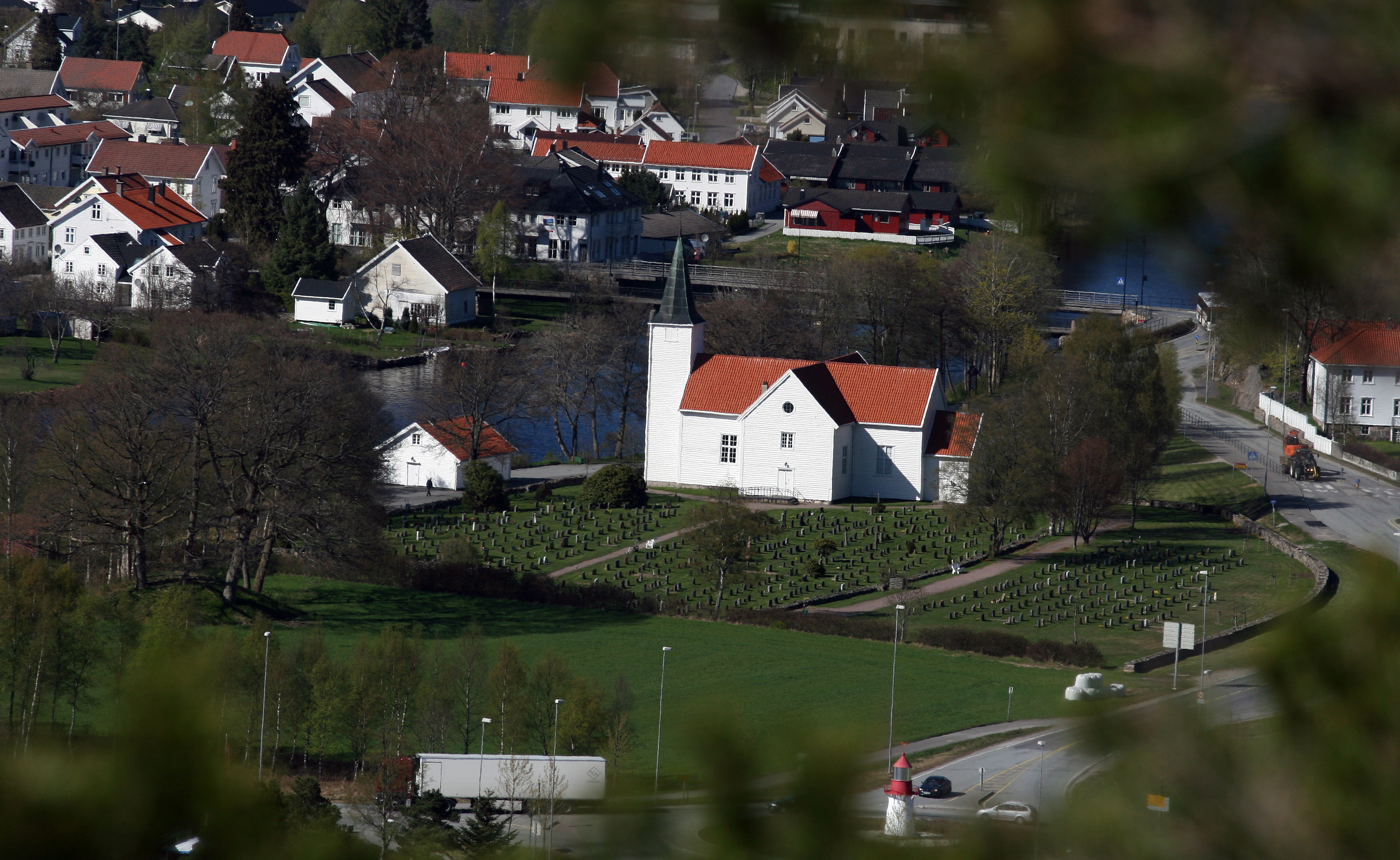

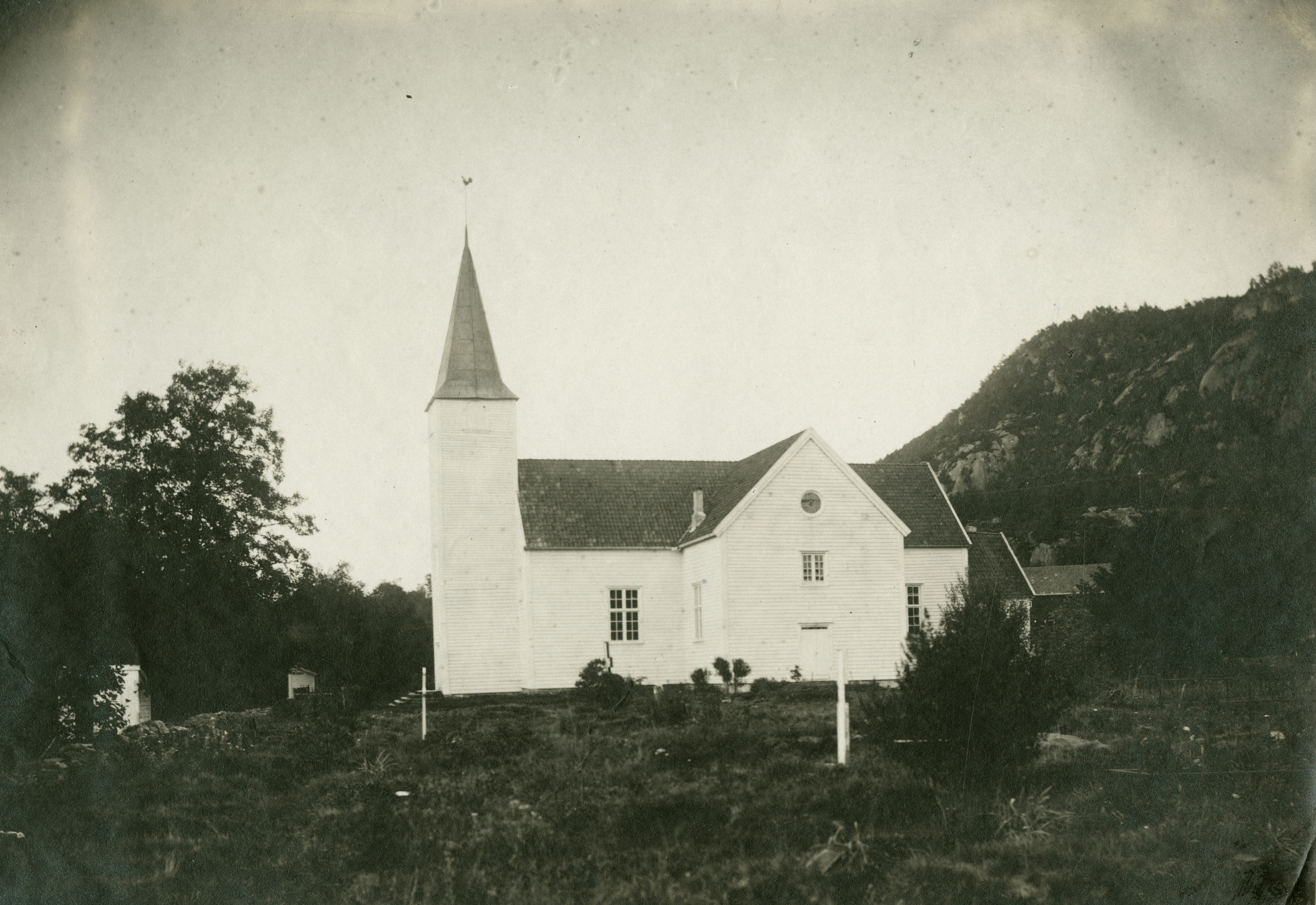

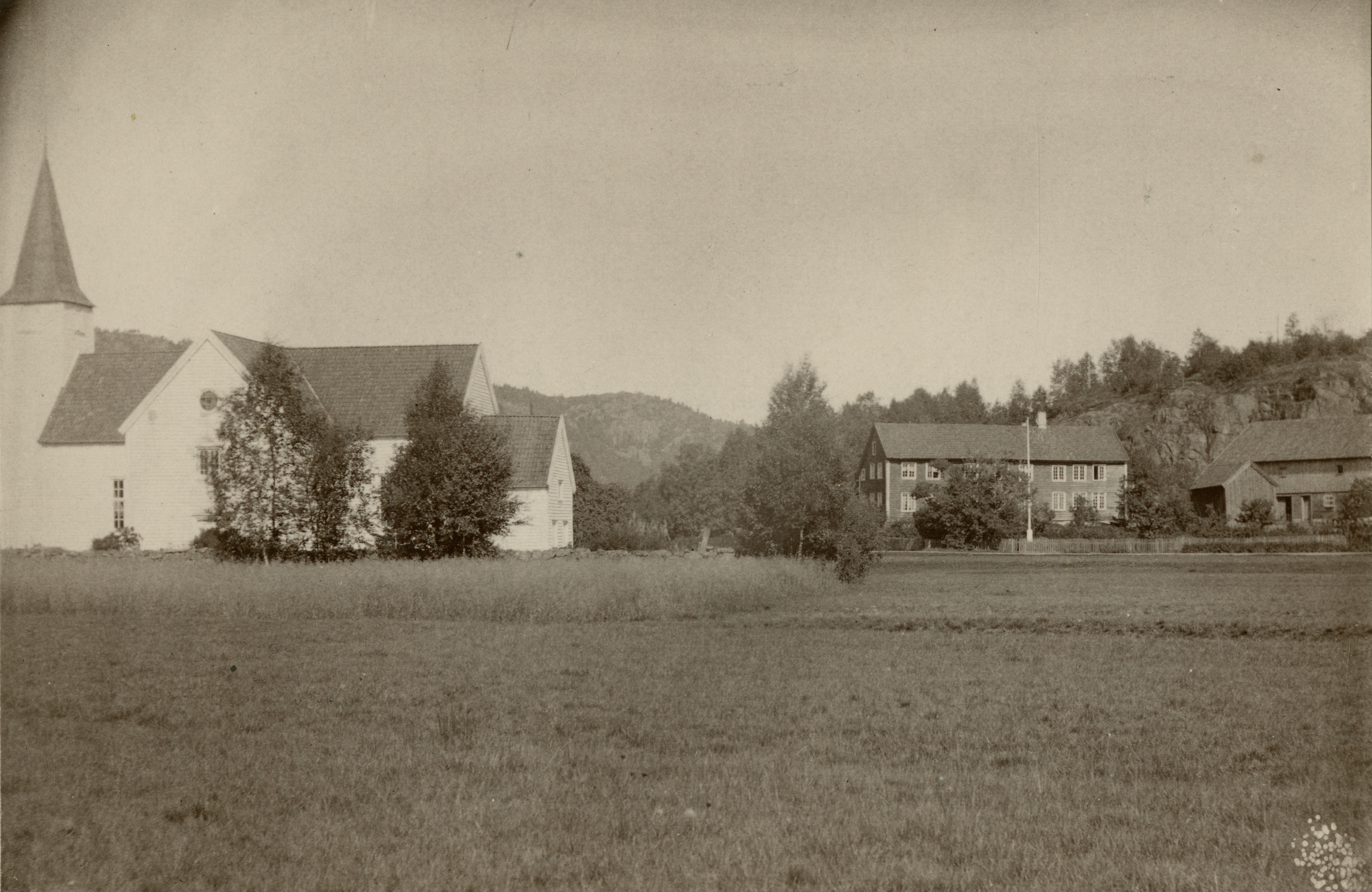

== See also ==
- List of churches in Agder og Telemark
