= Høllen, Lindesnes =

Village in Lindesnes Municipality, Norway

Høllen Spangereid
- Village
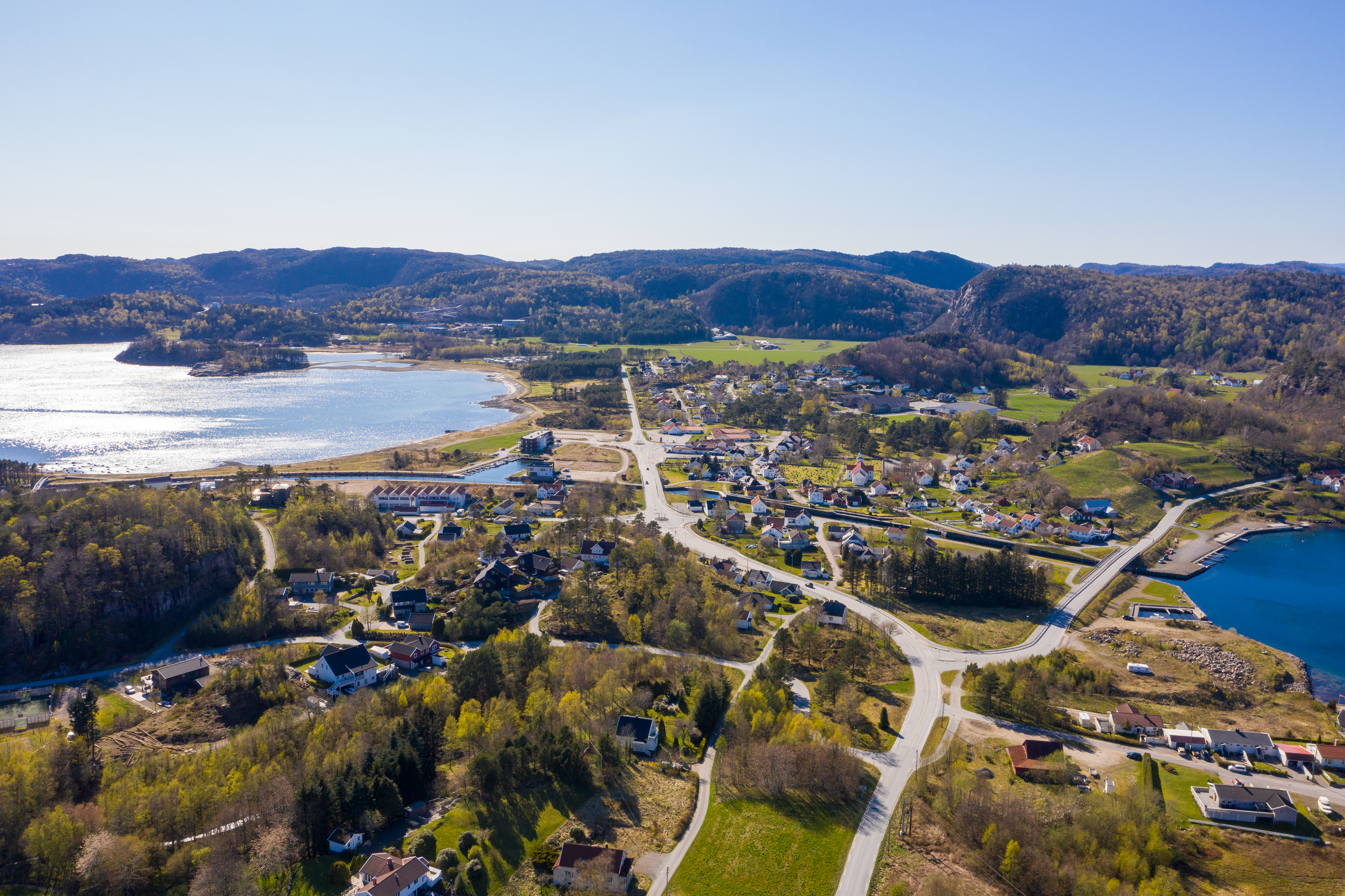
- View of the village
- Interactive map of Høllen
- Coordinates: 58.04543°N 7.14407°E
- Country: Norway
- Region: Southern Norway
- County: Agder
- District: Lindesnes
- Municipality: Lindesnes Municipality

Area
  - Total: 0.81 km^{2} (0.31 sq mi)
- Elevation: 3 m (9.8 ft)

Population (2025)
  - Total: 731
  - Density: 902/km^{2} (2,340/sq mi)
- Time zone: UTC+01:00 (CET)
  - Summer (DST): UTC+02:00 (CEST)
- Post Code: 4521 Lindesnes

Høllen or Spangereid is a village in Lindesnes Municipality in Agder county, Norway. The village is located on the narrow isthmus connecting the Lindesnes peninsula to the mainland, about 5 kilometres (3.1 mi) west of the village of Svennevik. The 0.81-square-kilometre (200-acre) village has a population (2025) of 731 and a population density of 902 inhabitants per square kilometre (2,340/sq mi).

== History ==
The area is one of Norway's richest archaeological sites. The abundant remnants from the Bronze Age and Viking Age show the Spangereid was a very important place at that time. Today, the village is a popular tourist destination for Norwegians and Europeans alike.

Høllen was the administrative centre of the old Spangereid Municipality which existed from 1889 until 1965. The village is also known as Spangereid since it was the centre of Spangereid for nearly a century and prior to that it was the seat of the parish of Spangereid since Spangereid Church is located in Høllen.

In 2007, the Spangereid Canal was completed through the centre of Høllen. The 0.93-kilometre (0.58 mi) long canal crosses the isthmus connecting the Lindesnes peninsula to the mainland. The canal connects the Lenesfjorden to the North Sea.

== Photo gallery ==
Map of the Spangereid area

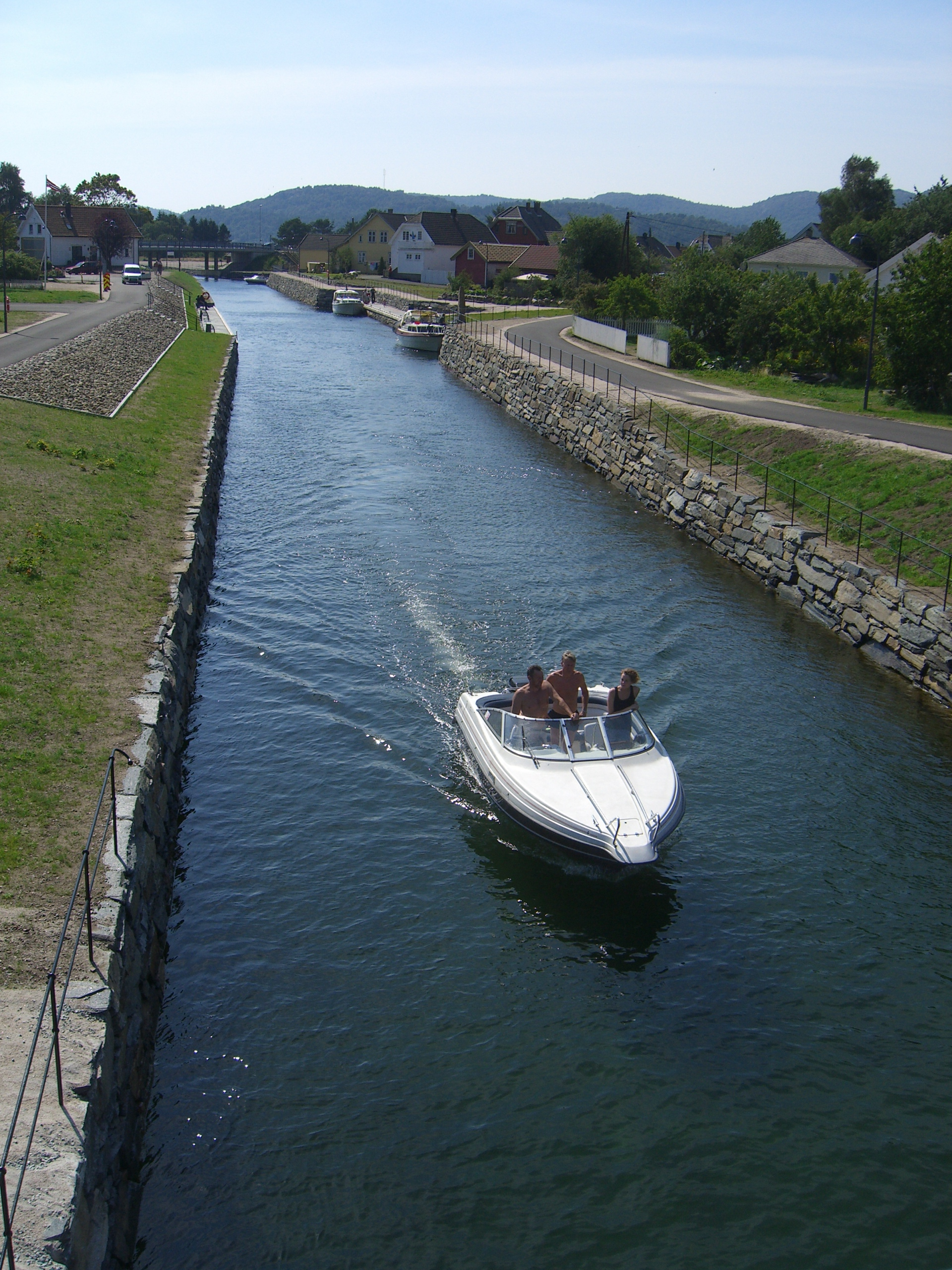
Spangereid Canal

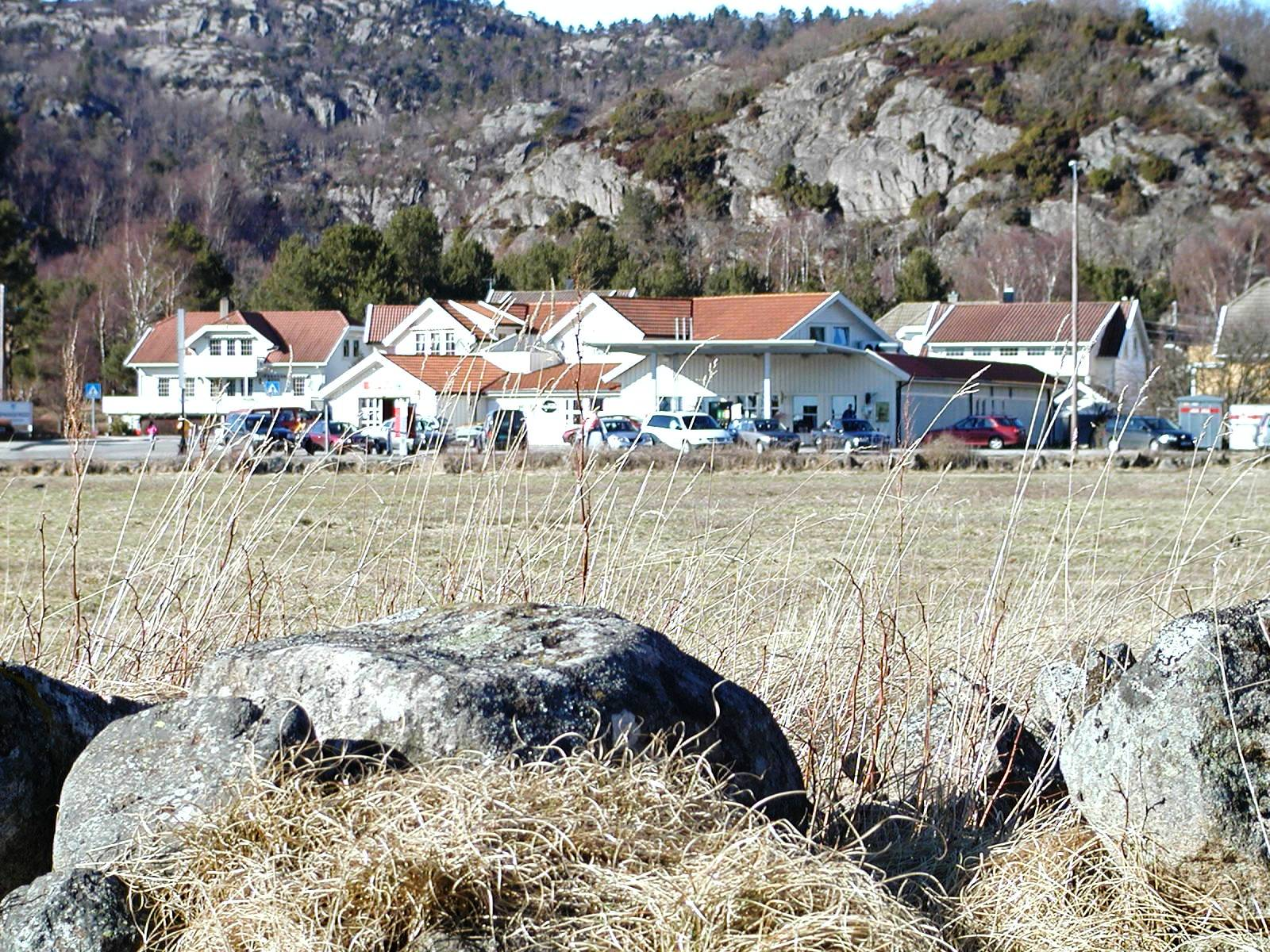
Central part of Høllen

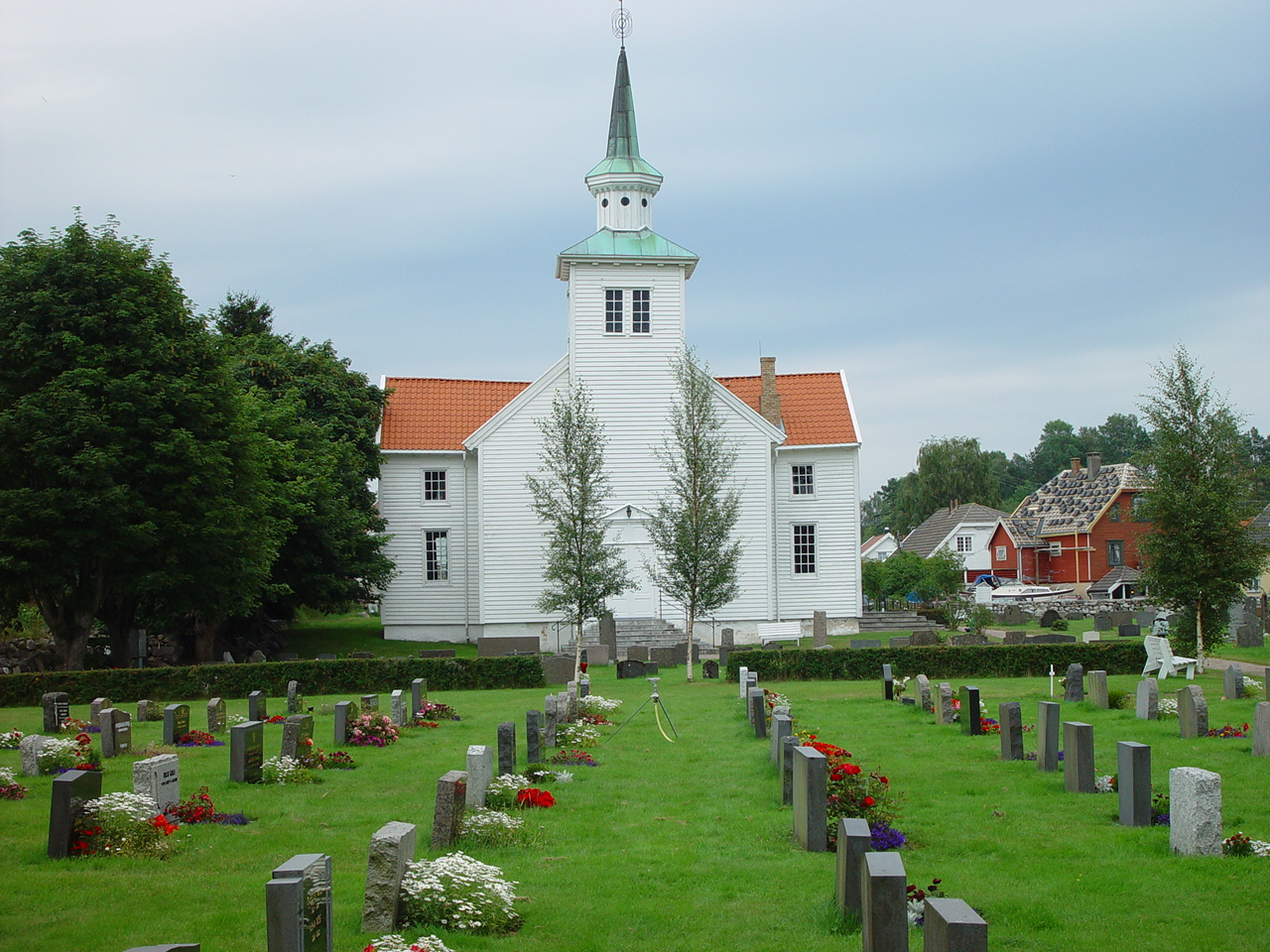
Spangereid Church
