= Lindesnes (peninsula) =

Southernmost cape in Norway

Lindesnes The Naze (historic English name)
- Peninsula
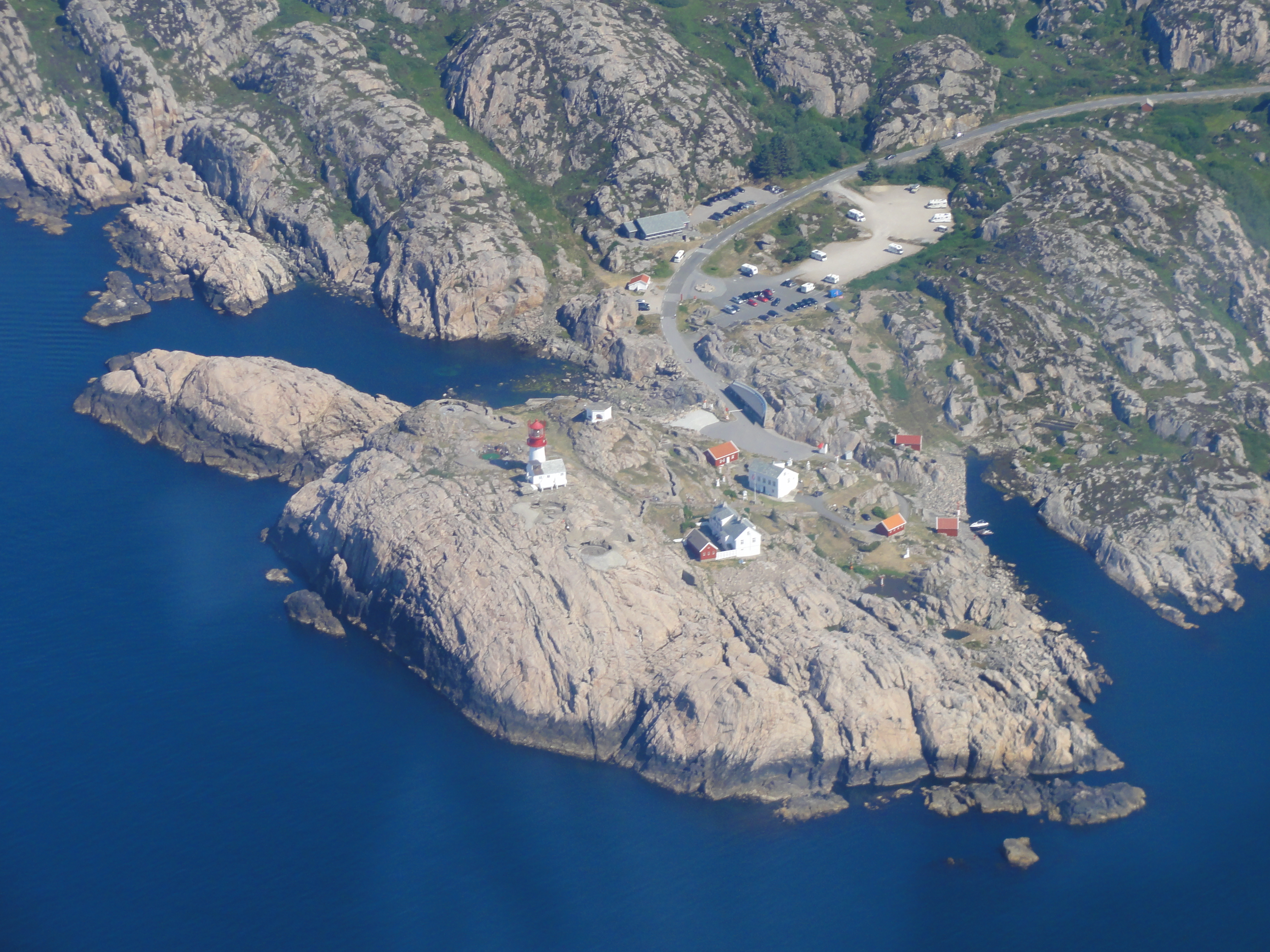
- View of the southern tip and lighthouse
- Interactive map of Lindesnes
- Coordinates: 58.00861°N 7.06189°E
- Location: Agder, Norway
- Water bodies: North Sea

Lindesnes is a peninsula and cape in Lindesnes Municipality in Agder county, Norway. The southern tip of Lindesnes is the site of the Lindesnes Lighthouse, the southernmost point of mainland Norway. It is 1,752 kilometres (1,089 mi) from Kinnarodden, the northernmost point in mainland Norway. The Lindesnes peninsula forms the boundary between the sea areas (and weather forecast areas): the Skagerrak is to the east and the North Sea is to the west.

== History ==
The area is one of Norway's richest archaeological sites. The abundant remnants from the Bronze Age and Viking Age show this area (especially the area around Høllen) was a very important place at that time. The burial grounds were investigated by Oluf Rygh and Anders Lorange in 1879. In 1977 and 1978, Jan Henning Larsen excavated a handful of boat graves under flat ground; all of them were from the Viking Age.

=== Name ===
The oldest Old Norse form of the name was Líðandi. That name is derived from the verb líða which means "lead to an end" or "go to the end" and the meaning of this name is probably just "the end", referring to its location at the southern tip of Norway. A later form was Líðandisnes where the word nes which means "headland" was added (a word that is related to the English forms ness and naze). The traditional/historic English language version of the name is just the Naze, derived from ness meaning headland.

== Island ==
From just after 9:00 am on 21 June 2007 when the Spangereid Canal in Høllen was finished being excavated, the Lindesnes peninsula technically became an artificial island. On that date, the Lindesnes peninsula was redefined from a peninsula to an island by the Norwegian Mapping Authority. Norway's southernmost point on the mainland then became Odden, located on the north side of Skjernøysund in Mandal Municipality, about 4 kilometres (2.5 mi) southeast of the town of Mandal (58°00′12.599″N 07°30′47.689″E). However, in February 2008, the Norwegian Mapping Authority reconsidered its initial decision and reversed it, so that Lindesnes is still considered Norway's southernmost point on the mainland. The Norwegian Mapping Authority decided to follow the UN definition, which states that since the Spangereid Canal is a man-made construction, the Lindesnes Peninsula cannot be considered an island.

== See also ==
- List of islands of Norway
