= Spangereid Church =

Church in Agder, Norway

- Spangereid kirke
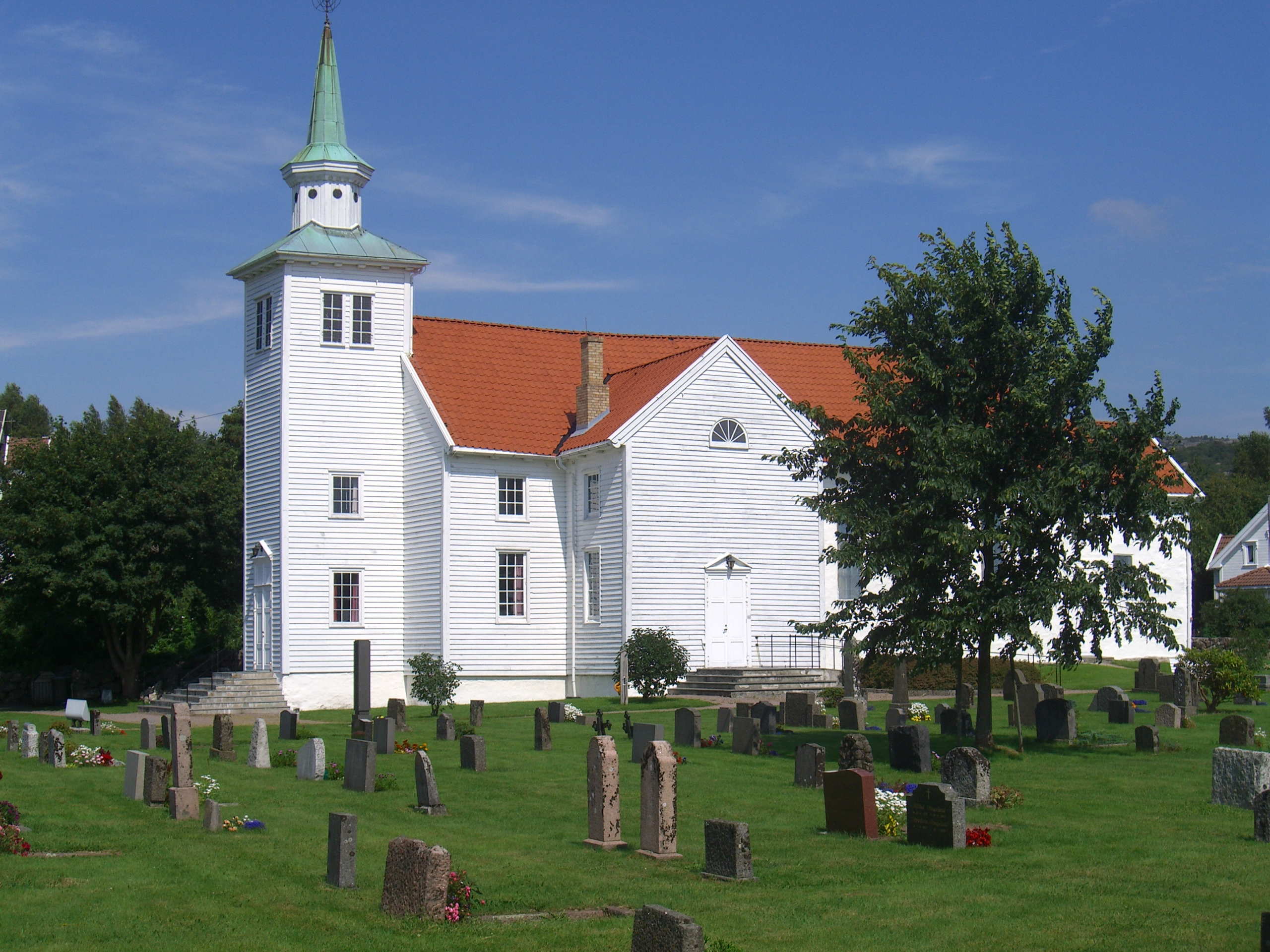
- View of the church
- Spangereid Church
- 58.046483°N 07.141807°E
- Location: Lindesnes Municipality, Agder
- Country: Norway
- Denomination: Church of Norway
- Previous denomination: Catholic Church
- Churchmanship: Evangelical Lutheran

History
- Status: Parish church
- Founded: 1140
- Events: Expanded in 1830

Architecture
- Functional status: Active
- Architectural type: Cruciform
- Style: Romanesque
- Completed: 1140 (886 years ago)

Specifications
- Capacity: 300
- Materials: Stone

Administration
- Diocese: Agder og Telemark
- Deanery: Lister og Mandal prosti
- Parish: Lindesnes
- Norwegian Cultural Heritage Site
- Type: Church
- Status: Automatically protected
- ID: 85529

Spangereid Church (Norwegian: Spangereid kirke) is a parish church of the Church of Norway in Lindesnes Municipality in Agder county, Norway. It is located in the village of Høllen. It is one of the churches for the Lindesnes parish which is part of the Lister og Mandal prosti (deanery) in the Diocese of Agder og Telemark. The white, stone church was built in a Romanesque cruciform design around the year 1140 using plans drawn up by an unknown architect. The church seats about 300 people.

== History ==
The earliest existing historical records of the church date back to the year 1328, but the church construction has been dated to approximately the year 1140. The Romanesque stone church originally had a rectangular nave and a narrower, square chancel. During the 1830s, the western wall of the church was removed and the church was lengthened and small additions were built to the north and south, creating a cruciform design, nearly doubling the size of the church. A tower over the new western entrance was also constructed during this expansion project.

In 1814, this church served as an election church (Norwegian: valgkirke). Together with more than 300 other parish churches across Norway, it was a polling station for elections to the 1814 Norwegian Constituent Assembly which wrote the Constitution of Norway. This was Norway's first national elections. Each church parish was a constituency that elected people called "electors" who later met together in each county to elect the representatives for the assembly that was to meet at Eidsvoll Manor later that year.

== Media gallery ==
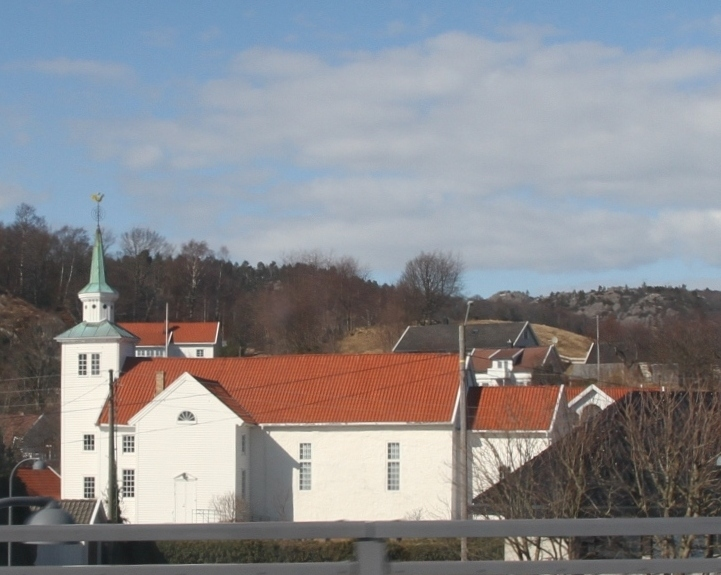
Side view of the church

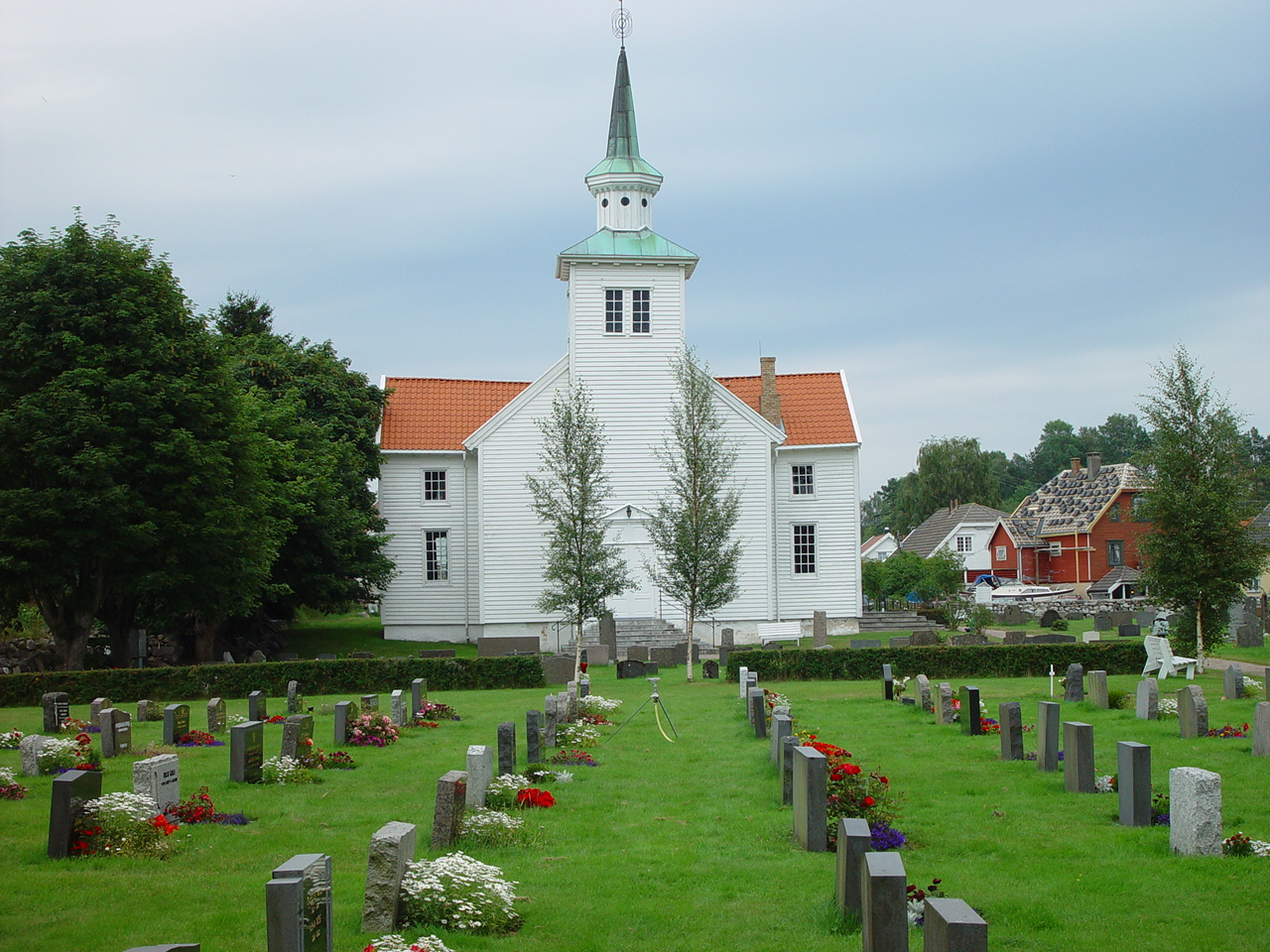
End view of the church

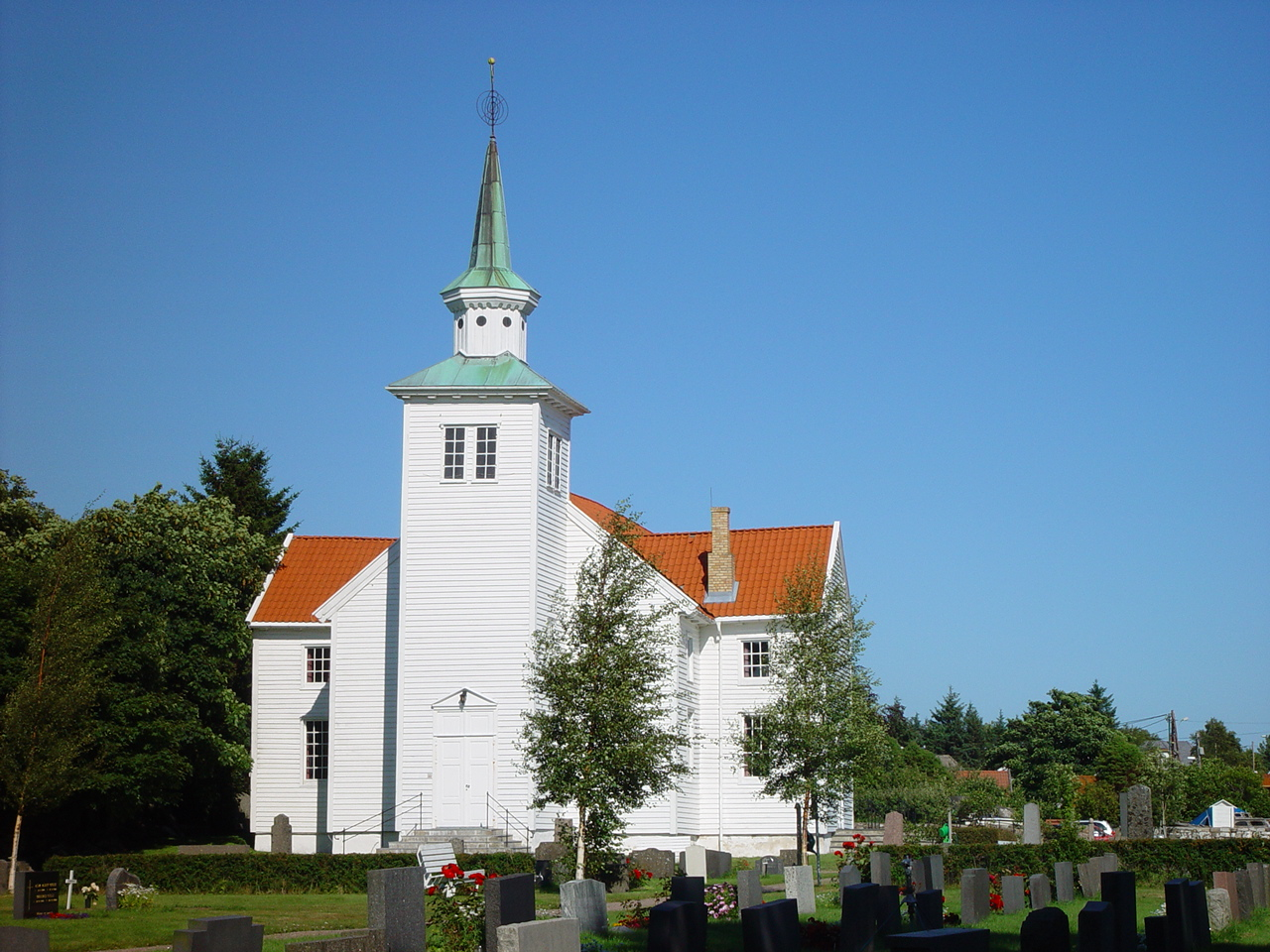
Front view of the church

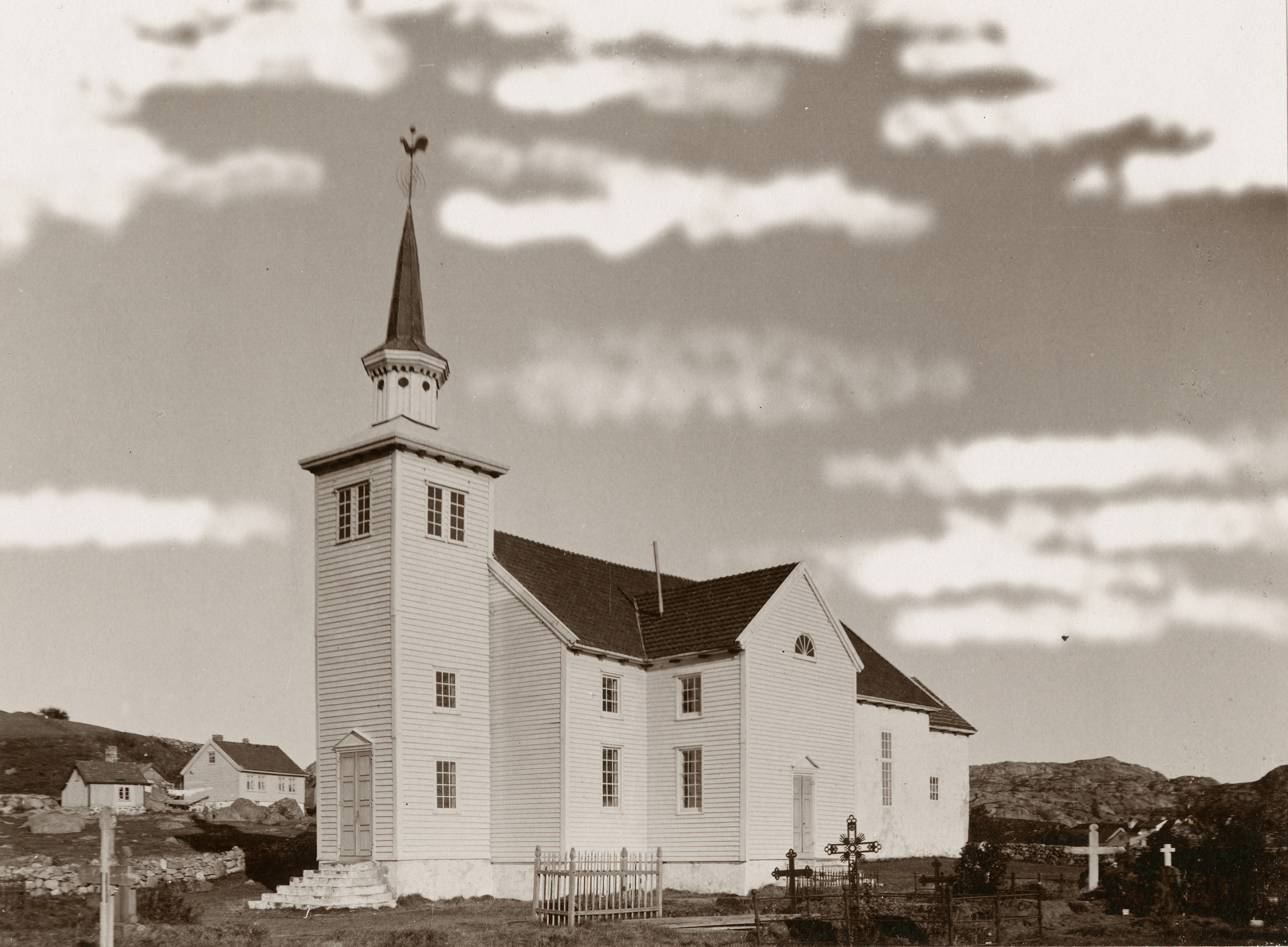
Historic view of the church

== See also ==
- List of churches in Agder og Telemark
