= Sira Station =

Railway station in Flekkefjord, Norway

Sira
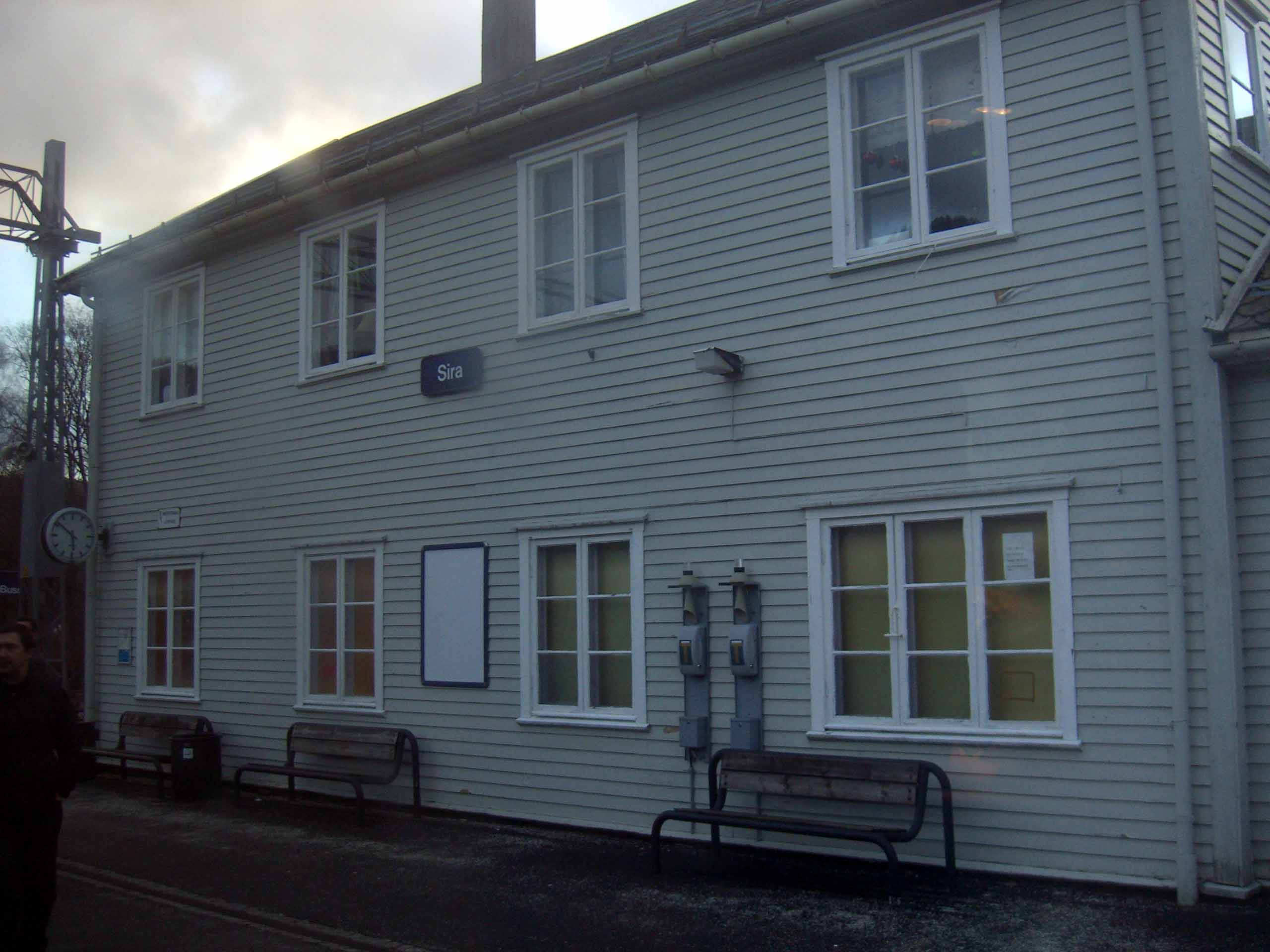

General information
- Location: Sira, Flekkefjord Municipality; Norway
- Coordinates: 58°25′04″N 6°39′39″E
- Elevation: 72.7 m (239 ft) AMSL
- Owner: Bane NOR
- Operator: Go-Ahead Norge
- Line: Sørlandet Line
- Distance: 468.63 km (291.19 mi)

Other information
- Station code: SIR

History
- Opened: 1943
Location

Sira Station (Norwegian: Sira stasjon) (IATA: XOQ) is a railway station located at the village of Sira in Flekkefjord Municipality, Norway on the railway Sørlandet Line. The station is served by regional trains operated by Go-Ahead Norge to Stavanger and Kristiansand.

== History ==
The station was opened in 1904 when the Jæren Line was extended from Egersund to Flekkefjord. In 1943 the current station was built when it became part of the Sørlandet Line, making Flekkefjord Line a branch line terminating at Sira.

Preceding station	Express trains	Following station
Moi towards Stavanger	F5	Gyland towards Oslo S
