= Stordrange =

Stordrange is a Norwegian surname. Notable people with the surname include:

- Bjørn Stordrange (born 1956), Norwegian jurist and politician
- Kolbjørn Stordrange (1924–2004), Norwegian politician
