= Sigmund Kroslid =

Norwegian politician

Sigmund Kroslid (born 11 October 1947) is a Norwegian politician for the Christian Democratic Party, best known for being the mayor of Flekkefjord Municipality for fourteen years.

== Career ==
He was born in Flekkefjord as a son of David Kroslid and Mathilde Heskestad. The family, which had its roots in Gyland Municipality, moved to Lista Municipality when Kroslid was three years old. After finishing secondary education in Farsund in 1967, he worked one year as an electrician's apprentice in the Flekkefjord Slipp & Maskinfabrikk factory. He then spent three years at Stavanger Technical School, and then returned to Flekkefjord Slipp & Maskinfabrikk where he has spent the rest of his professional career. Since 1997 he has been the market director of the company. However, he did not work full-time during his time as mayor.

Kroslid became involved in politics as leader of the local Youth of the Christian People's Party branch in 1972. From 1975 to 1976 he chaired the regional chapter in Vest-Agder. Kroslid was then a member of the municipal council of Flekkefjord Municipality from 1975 to 2007, serving as deputy mayor from 1990 to 1991 and mayor from 1987 to 1989 and 1995 to 2007. He stepped down ahead of the Norwegian local elections in 2007 to spend more time with his family, and to resume his career at Flekkefjord Slipp & Maskinfabrikk. Nationally, he served as a deputy representative to the Parliament of Norway from his county Vest-Agder for four terms, from 1993–1997, 1997–2001, 2001–2005 and 2005–2009. He has also been a deputy member of the Vest-Agder county council.

He has been a board member and chair of the local branches of the Norwegian State Food Authority and the Norwegian Association of Local and Regional Authorities. For the latter organization he was a member of the national board from 1999 to 2003. He has also been involved in several local companies and bodies, and since late 2005 he is the chair of Agder Energi. One of his first actions as chair was to hire Christian Rynning-Tønnesen as the new CEO in February 2006; however Rynning-Tønnesen changed his mind in early June and went to Norske Skog.

== Personal life ==
Kroslid is married and has three children; the two oldest are twins. He is an active adherent of Methodism, a denomination with slightly more than 11,000 followers in Norway. He has been a member of the central committee of the Methodist Church in Norway, as well as the union of Methodist churches in Northern Europe.
