= Bakke Municipality =

Former municipality in Southern Norway

Bakke Municipality Bakke herred
- Former municipality
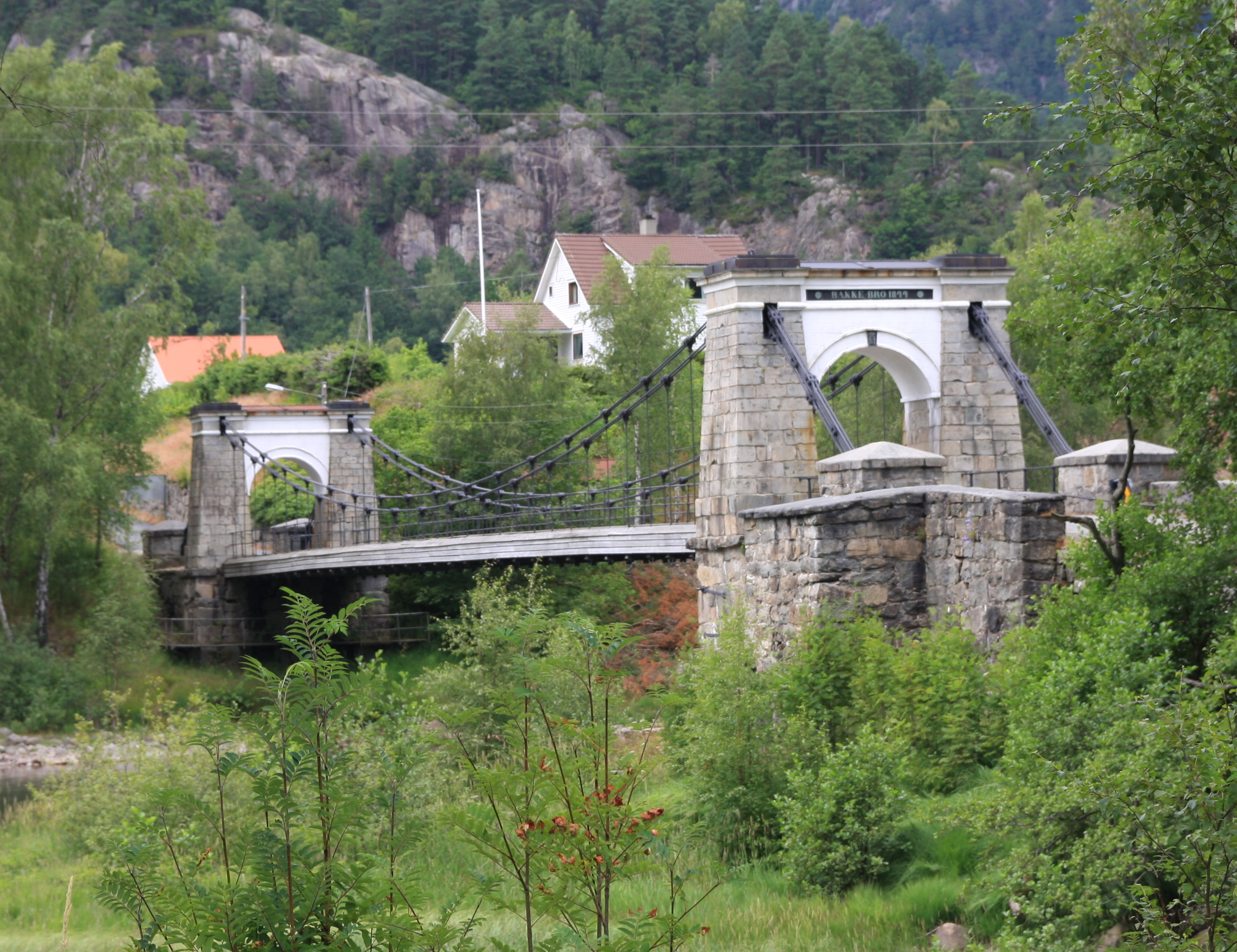
- View of a bridge in Bakke

- Vest-Agder within Norway

- Bakke within Vest-Agder
- Coordinates: 58°24′40″N 06°39′27″E
- Country: Norway
- County: Vest-Agder
- District: Lister
- Established: 1 Jan 1838
  - Created as: Formannskapsdistrikt
- Disestablished: 1 Jan 1965
  - Succeeded by: Flekkefjord Municipality and Sirdal Municipality
- Administrative centre: Sira

Area (upon dissolution)
  - Total: 250 km^{2} (97 sq mi)
  - Rank: #304 in Norway
- Highest elevation: 758 m (2,487 ft)

Population (1964)
  - Total: 923
  - Rank: #490 in Norway
  - Density: 3.7/km^{2} (9.6/sq mi)
  - Change (10 years): ▼ −29.3%

Official language
  - Norwegian form: Neutral
- Time zone: UTC+01:00 (CET)
  - Summer (DST): UTC+02:00 (CEST)
- ISO 3166 code: NO-1045

Bakke is a former municipality in the old Vest-Agder county, Norway. The 250-square-kilometre (97 sq mi) municipality existed from 1838 until its dissolution in 1965. The area is now divided between Sirdal Municipality and Flekkefjord Municipality in the traditional district of Lister in Agder county. The administrative centre was the village of Sira where Bakke Church is located.

Prior to its dissolution in 1965, the 250-square-kilometre (97 sq mi) municipality was the 304th largest by area out of the 525 municipalities in Norway. Bakke Municipality was the 490th most populous municipality in Norway with a population of about 923. The municipality's population density was 3.7 inhabitants per square kilometre (9.6/sq mi) and its population had decreased by 29% over the previous 10-year period.

== General information ==
The large church parish of Bakke (population: 2,378 in 1835) was split into three civil municipalities on 1 January 1838: Vestre Bakke Municipality (in Stavanger county), Østre Bakke Municipality, and Gyland Municipality (both in Lister og Mandal county). This division occurred because the main church parish of Bakke contained land in both the counties of Stavanger and Lister og Mandal and they had to be divided according to the newly-passed formannskapsdistrikt law. This situation was very rare in Norway - most parishes were only in one county. Due to the very low populations of the three municipalities, this arrangement did not last long. In August 1838, the county border was moved westwards to its current position, and Østre Bakke Municipality and Vestre Bakke Municipality were merged to form Bakke Municipality. Then about a year later, in November 1839, Gyland Municipality was merged (back) into Bakke Municipality.

In 1849, Bakke Municipality was divided: the northern district (population: 1,804) became the new Sirdal Municipality and the southern district (population: 2,597) remained as a smaller Bakke Municipality. On 31 December 1893, Bakke Municipality was divided again. The southeastern district (population: 1,085) was separated to become the new Gyland Municipality and the remaining areas (population: 1,368) continued on as a smaller Bakke Municipality.

During the 1960s, there were many municipal mergers across Norway due to the work of the Schei Committee. On 1 January 1960, the Øksendal area (population: 226) was removed from northern Bakke Municipality and merged with the following areas to form a new Sirdal Municipality:

- all of Tonstad Municipality (population: 651)
- all of Øvre Sirdal Municipality (population: 549)
- the Øksendal area of Bakke Municipality (population: 226)

On 1 January 1965, Bakke Municipality was dissolved and the following areas were merged to form a new, larger Flekkefjord Municipality:

- the town of Flekkefjord (population: 3,163)
- all of Hidra Municipality (population: 1,277)
- all of Nes Municipality (population: 2,757)
- all of Gyland Municipality (population: 691)
- all of Bakke Municipality (population: 925)

=== Name ===
The municipality (originally the parish) is named after the old Bakke farm (Old Norse: Bakkar), located on the south side of the present-day village of Sira since the first Bakke Church was built there. The name is the plural form of bakki which means "river bank" or "ridge".

=== Churches ===
The Church of Norway had one parish (sokn) within Bakke Municipality. At the time of the municipal dissolution, it was part of the Bakke prestegjeld and the Flekkefjord prosti (deanery) in the Diocese of Agder.

Churches in Bakke Municipality
Parish (sokn)	Church name	Location of the church	Year built
Bakke	Bakke	Sira	1865
Bakke	Haughom Chapel	Haughom	1930

== Geography ==
The municipality included the southern part of the Sirdalen valley along the lake Sirdalsvatnet down to the lake Lundevatnet in the south. The highest point in the municipality was the 758-metre (2,487 ft) tall mountain Solhomheia, located near the eastern border with Fjotland Municipality. Sirdal Municipality was located to the north/northeast, Gyland Municipality was located to the southeast, Nes Municipality was located to the south, and Lund Municipality was located to the west (in Rogaland county).

== Government ==
While it existed, Bakke Municipality was responsible for primary education (through 10th grade), outpatient health services, senior citizen services, welfare and other social services, zoning, economic development, and municipal roads and utilities. The municipality was governed by a municipal council of directly elected representatives. The mayor was indirectly elected by a vote of the municipal council. The municipality was under the jurisdiction of the Flekkefjord District Court and the Agder Court of Appeal.

=== Municipal council ===
The municipal council (Herredsstyre) of Bakke Municipality was made up of 15 representatives that were elected to four year terms. The tables below show the historical composition of the council by political party.

Bakke herredsstyre 1963–1964
Party name (in Norwegian)	Number of representatives
Labour Party (Arbeiderpartiet)	5
Christian Democratic Party (Kristelig Folkeparti)	2
Centre Party (Senterpartiet)	2
Liberal Party (Venstre)	4
Local List(s) (Lokale lister)	2
Total number of members:	15
Note: On 1 January 1965, Bakke Municipality became part of Flekkefjord Municipality.

Bakke herredsstyre 1959–1963
Party name (in Norwegian)	Number of representatives
Labour Party (Arbeiderpartiet)	4
Christian Democratic Party (Kristelig Folkeparti)	2
Centre Party (Senterpartiet)	2
Liberal Party (Venstre)	4
Local List(s) (Lokale lister)	3
Total number of members:	15

Bakke herredsstyre 1955–1959
Party name (in Norwegian)	Number of representatives
Labour Party (Arbeiderpartiet)	4
Christian Democratic Party (Kristelig Folkeparti)	2
Joint List(s) of Non-Socialist Parties (Borgerlige Felleslister)	6
Local List(s) (Lokale lister)	3
Total number of members:	15

Bakke herredsstyre 1951–1955
Party name (in Norwegian)	Number of representatives
Labour Party (Arbeiderpartiet)	2
Christian Democratic Party (Kristelig Folkeparti)	2
Local List(s) (Lokale lister)	8
Total number of members:	12

Bakke herredsstyre 1947–1951
Party name (in Norwegian)	Number of representatives
Labour Party (Arbeiderpartiet)	2
Local List(s) (Lokale lister)	10
Total number of members:	12

Bakke herredsstyre 1945–1947
Party name (in Norwegian)	Number of representatives
Labour Party (Arbeiderpartiet)	3
Local List(s) (Lokale lister)	9
Total number of members:	12

Bakke herredsstyre 1937–1941*
Party name (in Norwegian)	Number of representatives
Labour Party (Arbeiderpartiet)	2
Local List(s) (Lokale lister)	10
Total number of members:	12
Note: Due to the German occupation of Norway during World War II, no elections were held for new municipal councils until after the war ended in 1945.

=== Mayors ===
The mayor (Norwegian: ordfører) of Bakke Municipality was the political leader of the municipality and the chairperson of the municipal council. Since Bakke was located in two counties when it was established in 1838, the eastern part (Østre Bakke) and the western part (Vestre Bakke) each had their own mayor and municipal council. In the fall of 1838, the county border was moved so that all of Bakke could be one municipality starting in 1839. The following people have held this position:

- 1838–1838: Torkell Aanensen Birkeland (Mayor of Østre Bakke Municipality)
- 1838–1838: Ommund Carlsen Fintland (Mayor of Vestre Bakke Municipality)
- 1839–1841: Per Svensen Nedland
- 1842–1854: Brynjulv Johnsen Sandsmark
- 1855–1856: Nils Gabriel Salvesen Ranestad
- 1857–1860: Per Tjøstelsen Oftedal
- 1861–1862: Sigbjørn S. Modal
- 1863–1866: Per Tjøstelsen Oftedal
- 1867–1868: Henrik Eiriksen Skibelid
- 1869–1871: Per Tjøstelsen Oftedal
- 1871–1874: Henrik Eiriksen Skibelid
- 1875–1876: Tønnes Svensen Hegland
- 1877–1878: Evert Tollaksen Sporkeland
- 1879–1892: Tønnes Svensen Hegland
- 1893–1907: Gabriel Rolfsen Ersdal
- 1908–1910: Staale Lenne
- 1911–1922: Gabriel Rolfsen Ersdal
- 1922–1923: Anton Ersdal
- 1924–1928: Nils A. Sandsmark
- 1929–1931: Staale Lenne
- 1932–1934: Nils A. Sandsmark
- 1934–1940: Reinert Ersdal
- 1945–1947: Ole A. Modalsli

== See also ==
- List of former municipalities of Norway
