= Anders Beer (shipowner) =

Norwegian shipowner and tanner

Anders Beer (15 January 1801 – 24 January 1863) was a Norwegian ship-owner and tanner.

He was born in Flekkefjord as a son of ship-owner and consul Christopher Beer (1770–1839) and Anne Malene Tjørsvaag (1772–1820). He was a younger brother of Jens Henrik Beer, and a grandson of Jens Henrik Beer, Sr.

He attended Christianssand Cathedral School, and also stayed in France for some time before becoming a businessman in his hometown. Like many others in the town, he made a living out of the herring fishing industry as well as shipbuilding. He also operated a small tobacco factory and a mill in the district Tjørsvågstranden. After 1838 the herring fishing in South Norway declined rapidly, and Beer sold his ships and developed small industry at Tjørsvågstranden. He opened an oil press (linseed oil and other types), a sawmill, a bakery and a tannery. The tannery became especially successful, and Beer has been credited with founding the tanning industry in Norway. (Note: Norwegian: Anders Beer grunnla garveriindustrien i Norge da han anla det første garveri for sålelær i Flekkefjord. (Norsk biografisk leksikon)) He was the first to import hides to Norway. He exported to Sweden, in addition to covering the South Norwegian market with his products. The export was conducted with three ships owned by Beer, one sloop and two lesser vessels.

Beer was a consul of France from 1829 to 1837 and Denmark from 1853 to 1858. He was also the mayor of Flekkefjord Municipality for the year of 1843, being preceded by Johan Andreas Kraft and succeeded by L. L. Ross. In 1855 he paid for a road connection between Flekkefjord and Tjørsvågstranden.

Beer was married twice, first to Kirstine Dorothea Lassen (1803–1843) and then to Thea Smith (1822–1914). He was a maternal grandfather of Anders Beer Wilse. He died in January 1863 in Flekkefjord. His company went bankrupt shortly after his death, but other tanneries in the town survived. A road in Flekkefjord, Anders Beers gate, has been named after him.
