= Gudmund Seland =

Editor

Gudmund Seland (11 November 1907 – 1996) was a Norwegian resistance member and newspaper editor.

Seland was born in Flekkefjord. He worked as a book printer before the Second World War, but together with his brother Johannes Seland he was involved in the resistance movement during the occupation of Norway by Nazi Germany.

Seland was arrested on 4 April 1944, and was held at Gestapo Headquarters in Kristiansand (in what had been the State Archive building). From 5 August 1944 until Victory in Europe Day (8 May 1945) Seland was imprisoned in Grini concentration camp.

After the war he became deputy mayor of Nes Municipality, serving as mayor from 1952 to 1956. He was an editor for the newspaper Agder from 1954. He stepped down and sold the newspaper in 1970. Seland also wrote books on local history. He died in 1996.
