= Bjørn Stordrange =

Norwegian Conservative party politician

Bjørn Stordrange (born 13 January 1956 in Flekkefjord) is a Norwegian jurist and politician for the Conservative Party. His father Kolbjørn Stordrange was a member of parliament before him, representing the same party.

Bjørn Stordrange served as a deputy representative to the Norwegian Parliament from Vest-Agder during the terms 1981–1985, 1985–1989 and 1989–1993. From 1981 to 1983 he served as a regular representative, covering for Tore Austad who was a member of the first cabinet Willoch.

Outside politics Stordrange graduated as cand.jur. in 1982. He served his military service at the elite Russian language program of the Norwegian Armed Forces. At the University of Oslo he was hired as researcher in 1983 and associate professor (førsteamanuensis) in 1986. He took the doctorate degree in 1988, and was appointed district stipendiary magistrate (sorenskriver) in Flekkefjord Municipality from 1988 to 1992. He was assistant professor (professor II) at the University of Tromsø from 1989 to 1992, and at the Norwegian School of Management from 1997. He has also been a practising lawyer.

From 1989 to 1990, during the Conservative cabinet Syse, Stordrange was appointed state secretary in the Ministry of Justice and the Police. He is chairman of the board of Oslo Sporveier since 1998.
