= Kolbjørn Stordrange =

Norwegian politician

Kolbjørn Stordrange (27 September 1924 in Nes Municipality – 18 November 2004) was a Norwegian politician for the Conservative Party.

He was elected to the Norwegian Parliament from Vest-Agder in 1969, and was re-elected on one occasion. He had previously served as a deputy representative during the terms 1958–1961 and 1965–1969. During the latter term he served as a regular representative, covering for Sverre Walter Rostoft who was a member of the cabinet Borten.

On the local level he was a member of the municipal council from Nes Municipality from 1955 to 1964, serving as deputy mayor during the term 1959–1963. He was then a member of the municipal council of Flekkefjord Municipality in 1965 and from 1979 to 1995.

Outside politics he graduated as cand.philol. in 1954 and became a qualified teacher in 1956. He eventually became rector of Flekkefjord upper secondary school from 1979 to 1991. His son Bjørn Stordrange became a member of parliament as well, representing the same party.
