= Selura =

Lake in Flekkefjord, Norway

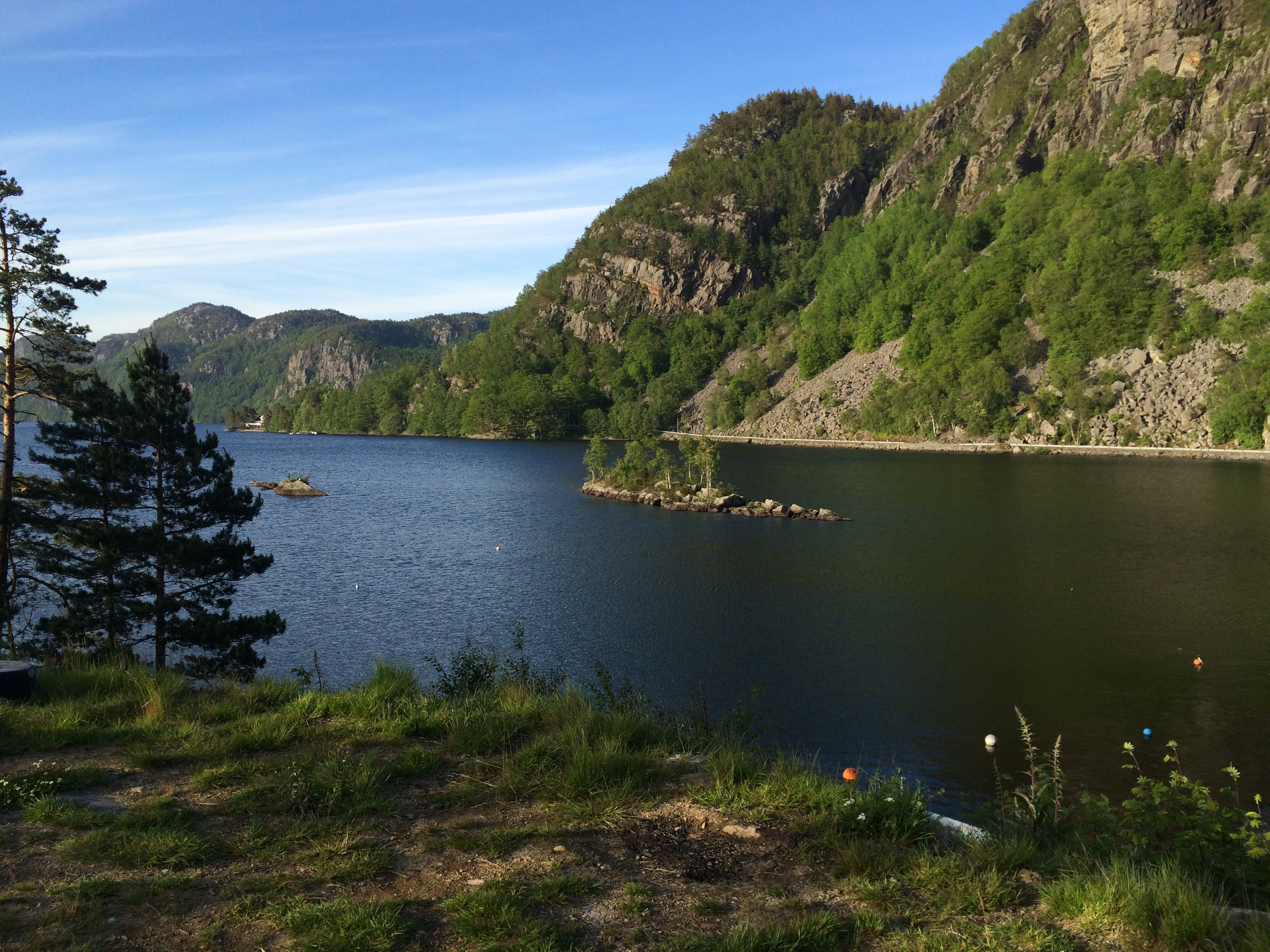
- View of the lake
- Interactive map of Selura
- Location: Flekkefjord Municipality, Agder
- Coordinates: 58.30835°N 6.70362°E
- Primary outflows: Grisefjorden
- Basin countries: Norway
- Max. length: 5.6 kilometres (3.5 mi)
- Max. width: 3 kilometres (1.9 mi)
- Surface area: 5.7 km^{2} (2.2 sq mi)
- Shore length^{1}: 31.48 kilometres (19.56 mi)
- Surface elevation: 32 metres (105 ft)
- References: NVE
- ^{1} Shore length is not a well-defined measure.

Selura is a lake in Flekkefjord Municipality in Agder County, Norway. The 5.7-square-kilometre (2.2 sq mi) lake is 32 metres (105 ft) above sea level and it is about 130 metres (430 ft) at its deepest. It is immediately northeast of the town of Flekkefjord

Selurafossen, the waterfall at the outflow of Selura, historically provided a source of power for some industries, including a barrel factory and tannery in Flekkefjord.

== See also ==
- List of lakes in Norway
