= Anders Kristian Rørvik =

Norwegian politician

Anders Kristian Rørvik (16 February 1861 – 25 July 1946) was a Norwegian farmer and politician.

He was born in Feda as a son of a farmer, and older brother of politician Cornelius Bernhard Hanssen. He attended three years of agricultural school in Denmark, and spent his professional career at the farms Huseby in Lier (1890 to 1891), Frogner (1891 to 1894), Melsom in Stokke (1894 to 1896), Jarlsberg Manor (1896 to 1908) and Rise in Sem (1908 to 1911).

He was a member of the municipal council of Sem Municipality from 1901 to 1910. He served as a deputy representative to the Parliament of Norway during the term 1907–1909. He represented the constituency Jarlsberg and the Coalition Party.
