= Hans Sivert Jacobsen =

Norwegian politician

Hans Syvert Jacobsen (3 August 1836 – 28 June 1901) was a Norwegian politician for the Liberal Party.

He was elected to the Parliament of Norway in 1898, representing the constituency of Flekkefjord. He worked as a merchant there. He served only one term. He was mayor of Flekkefjord Municipality in 1889.
