= Cornelius Bernhard Hanssen =

Norwegian teacher, shipowner and politician

Cornelius Bernhard Hanssen (25 February 1864 – 16 April 1939) was a Norwegian teacher, shipowner and politician for the Liberal Party.

He was born in Feda in Lister og Mandal county, Norway. He was the son of a farmer, and younger brother of politician Anders Kristian Rørvik. He graduated from teacher's seminary in Christianssand (now Kristiansand) in 1883, worked as a teacher from 1883 to 1891. He bought the newspaper Agder in Flekkefjord and started as editor-in-chief from 1892. Two years later, he started the publication, Det Norske Fredsblad which he published and edited from 1894 to 1899.

He started as a shipowner in 1898 with a focus on tankers. He was a board member of the Norwegian Shipowners' Association and a supervisory council member of Den Norske Amerikalinje.

He served as a member of the Parliament of Norway for the constituency Flekkefjord from 1900 to 1915 and from 1919 to 1921. He was elected three times for the Liberal Party and then twice for the Liberal Left Party. He also served as a deputy representative during the terms 1922–1924 and 1925 to 1927. He was elected as a member of Flekkefjord city council in 1931, and was mayor of Flekkefjord Municipality in the years 1933, 1936 and 1937.

He was co-founder of the Norwegian Peace Association (Nordisk Fredsforbund) in 1895, and became an honorary member. He also co-founded the Nordic Peace Fund (Norges Fredsfond) in 1917 and the Nordic Inter-Parliamentary Union in 1906, and served as president of the former. He sat on the Norwegian Nobel Committee from 1913 to 1939, from 1923 as deputy chairman.

== See also ==
- List of peace activists
