= Nils Elias Børresen =

Norwegian politician (1812–1863)

- Born: 1812
- Died: 1863 (aged 50–51)
- Occupation: Politician

Nils Elias Børresen (1812–1863) was a Norwegian politician.

He was elected to the Parliament of Norway in 1848, 1851, 1854, 1857, 1859 and 1862, representing the constituency of Flekkefjord. He worked as a merchant in that city. He was mayor of Flekkefjord Municipality in 1846, 1849, 1850, 1852 and 1862.
