= Elias Didrichsen =

Norwegian politician (1824–1888)

Elias Didrichsen (12 January 1824 – 18 April 1888) was a Norwegian politician.

He was elected to the Parliament of Norway in 1871, representing the urban constituency of Flekkefjord. He was re-elected in 1871, 1874, 1880, 1883 and 1886. He represented the Liberal Party after its founding in 1884, but the Conservative Party for his last term. He was mayor of Flekkefjord Municipality from 1853 to 1857, 1863 to 1870, 1878 to 1879 and 1883 to 1888.
