= Jens Henrik Beer Sr. =

Norwegian politician (1731–1808)

- Born: 1731; Flekkefjord
- Died: 1808 (aged 76–77)
- Occupation: businessperson

Jens Henrik Beer (1731 – 7 August 1808) was a Norwegian businessperson.

He was born in Flekkefjord as a son of merchant and sawmill owner Nils Henriksen Beer (1690–1746) and his wife Anna M. C. Eide. His father acquired burghership in 1736, and was probably a part of the first generation of the family to be born in Norway—Jens Henrik Beer's grandfather probably immigrated from Germany or the Netherlands. Beer was married twice; first to Elisabeth K. J. Eide (1736–1767) from 1763 to 1765, then to Ellen Bolette Færø (1745–1817) from 1769 to his death. He was a grandfather of Jens Henrik Beer and Anders Beer.

He attended school in the Netherlands, and also spent time at sea. He is notable for being one of the leading merchants between Norway and Scotland at his time. His ships exported timber to Scotland, and malt and flour in return to Norway. During the Seven Years' War he saved Scottish cargo by sailing under a Danish flag, and even sold it in France. He was declared an honorary citizen of Montrose in 1772. In Norway, to which he gradually retreated, he was a ship-owner and owned sawmills at Tjørsvaag, Fjeldså and Sirnes in the Flekkefjord district, at Haukom in Siredalen and at Feda.
