= Gyland Church =

Church in Agder, Norway

- Gyland kirke
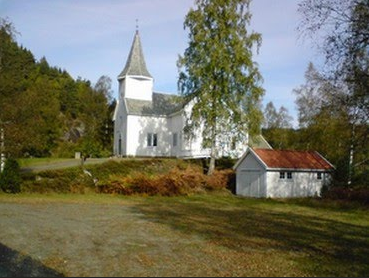
- View of the church
- Gyland Church
- 58.4115°N 06.7916°E
- Location: Flekkefjord Municipality, Agder
- Country: Norway
- Denomination: Church of Norway
- Churchmanship: Evangelical Lutheran

History
- Status: Parish church
- Founded: Middle Ages
- Consecrated: 1929

Architecture
- Functional status: Active
- Architectural type: Cruciform
- Completed: 1815; 211 years ago

Specifications
- Capacity: 300
- Materials: Wood

Administration
- Diocese: Agder og Telemark
- Deanery: Lister og Mandal prosti
- Parish: Gyland
- Norwegian Cultural Heritage Site
- Type: Church
- Status: Automatically protected
- ID: 84453

Gyland Church (Norwegian: Gyland kirke) is a parish church of the Church of Norway in the large Flekkefjord Municipality in Agder county, Norway. It is located in Nuland, a few kilometers southwest of the village of Gyland. It is the church for the Gyland parish which is part of the Lister og Mandal prosti (deanery) in the Diocese of Agder og Telemark. The white, wooden church was built in a cruciform design in 1815 using plans drawn up by an unknown architect. The church seats about 300 people.

== History ==
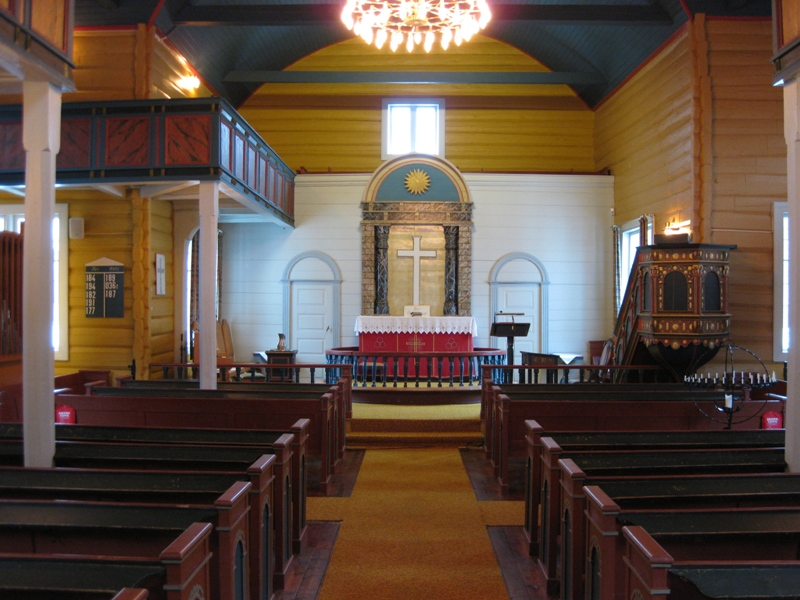
Interior of the church

The earliest existing historical records of the church date back to the year 1596, but there is evidence that there was a church in Gyland as far back as the year 1200. The old medieval stave church was located in what is now the village of Gyland. That church was torn down in the early 1600s and it was replaced by a timber-framed long church on the same site. In 1663, the church was inspected and found to be in good condition, but in 1794 when the church was again inspected, it was found to be in poor condition with rot and a roof that had leaks. Due to its poor condition, in 1815 the church building was torn down and a new, larger, cruciform building was constructed on the same site, finally being completed in 1817. Some of the materials from the old building were reused in the new building.

In 1929, the church site was moved from the village of Gyland to its current location in Nuland, about 3.5 kilometres (2.2 mi) southwest of the former location. The main reason to move the church was that its new location was more central in Gyland Municipality (Gyland Municipality later became part of Flekkefjord Municipality). In any case, the church needed major repairs, so something had to be done. The old church was taken down and it was re-constructed at the new site using the same design. The cemetery at the old church site obviously could not be moved and due to the location, it was not possible to establish a new cemetery the new location. In 1970, a new chapel was built at the old church site to serve the cemetery and the new church site is without a cemetery.

== See also ==
- List of churches in Agder og Telemark
