= Haughom Chapel =

Church in Agder, Norway

- Haughom kapell
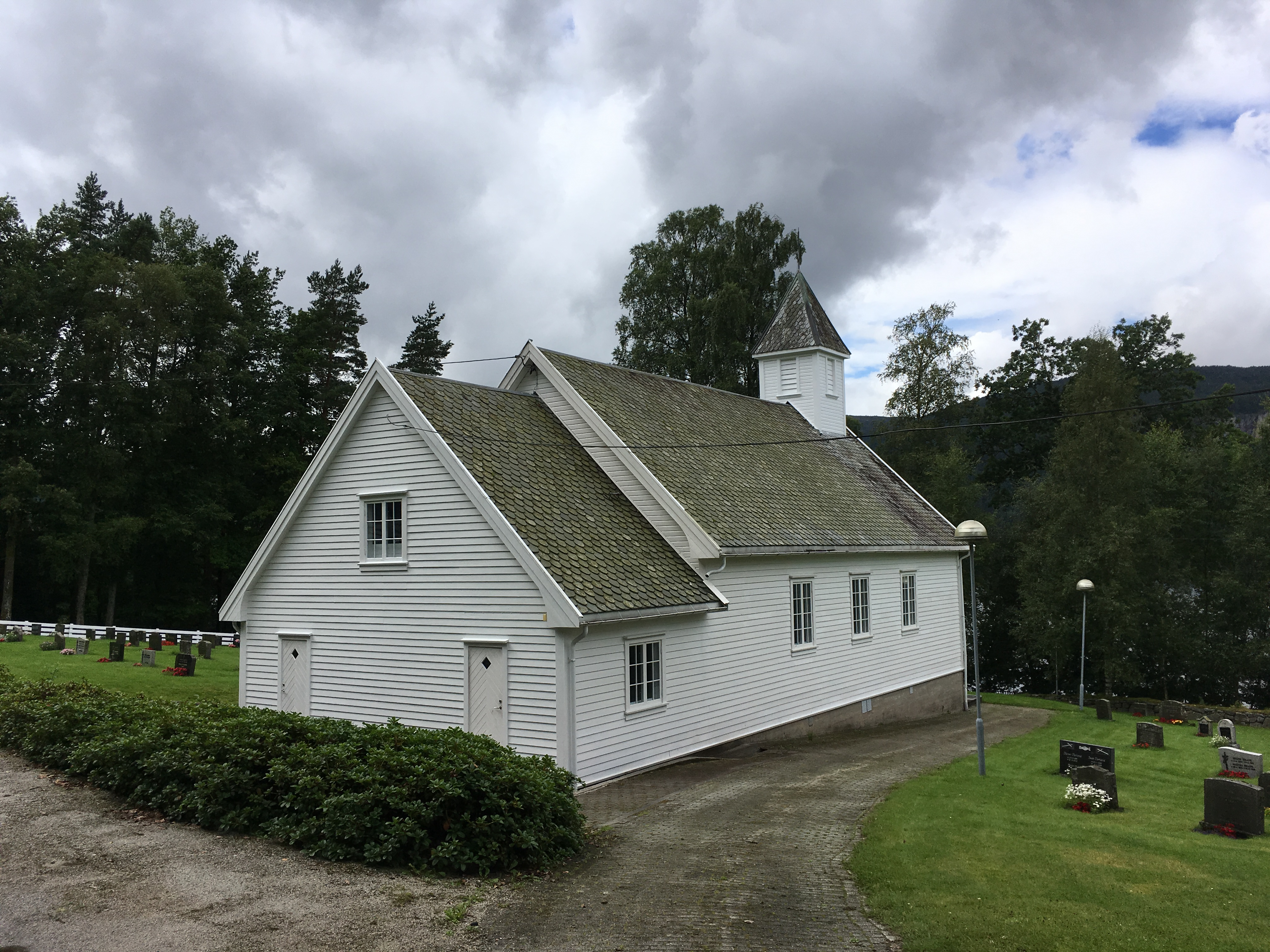
- View of the church
- Haughom Chapel
- 58.584709°N 06.72301°E
- Location: Sirdal Municipality, Agder
- Country: Norway
- Denomination: Church of Norway
- Churchmanship: Evangelical Lutheran

History
- Status: Parish church
- Founded: 1930
- Consecrated: 9 Oct 1930

Architecture
- Functional status: Active
- Architect: John A. Søyland
- Architectural type: Long church
- Completed: 1930; 96 years ago

Specifications
- Capacity: 150
- Materials: Wood

Administration
- Diocese: Agder og Telemark
- Deanery: Lister og Mandal prosti
- Parish: Sirdal
- Norwegian Cultural Heritage Site
- Type: Church
- Status: Listed
- ID: 84501

Haughom Church (Norwegian: Haughom kirke) is a parish church of the Church of Norway in the large Sirdal Municipality in Agder county, Norway. It is located in the village of Haughom on the eastern shore of the lake Sirdalsvatnet. It one of the four churches in the Sirdal parish which is part of the Lister og Mandal prosti (deanery) in the Diocese of Agder og Telemark. The white, wooden church was built in a long church design in 1930 using plans drawn up by the architect John A. Søyland. The church seats about 150 people.

== History ==
For a long time, the people in the northern part of Bakke Municipality had a long journey to the local parish church. After about 10–15 years of discussions and fundraising, a church was built in 1930. The church was consecrated on 9 October 1930 by the Bishop Bernt Støylen. The church was financed by a grant from the national government of 4,000 kr and a municipal grant of 2,000 kr plus donations from the residents of the area of about 10,000 kr.

== See also ==
- List of churches in Agder og Telemark
