= Sivert Hanssen-Sunde =

Norwegian politician

Sivert Hanssen-Sunde (19 July 1842 – 2 October 1923) was a Norwegian politician.

He was elected to the Parliament of Norway in 1895, representing the urban constituency of Flekkefjord. He worked as a merchant there. He sat through only one term. He was mayor of Flekkefjord Municipality from 1894 to 1899.
