= Jens Henrik Beer =

Norwegian politician (1799–1881)

- Born: 1799; Flekkefjord
- Died: 1881 (aged 81–82)
- Occupation: businessperson

Jens Henrik Beer (11 June 1799 – 22 June 1881) was a Norwegian businessperson, farmer and politician.

He was born in Flekkefjord as a son of ship-owner and consul Christopher Beer (1770–1839) and Anne Malene Tjørsvaag (1772–1820). He was an older brother of Anders Beer, and a grandson of Jens Henrik Beer, Sr. He attended school in Bergen and England, and then worked for a period in Bergen before returning to his hometown in 1821. In 1824 he married Andrea Laurentze Mølbach (1802–1872).

He worked as a ship-owner, shipbuilder, sawmill owner and merchant. He was the vice consul for Denmark from 1830 to 1853, the Russian Empire from 1932 to 1863 and the Netherlands from 1853 to 1863. He was elected to the Parliament of Norway in 1836, representing the rural constituency of Lister og Mandals Amt. He sat through only one term. He was mayor of Flekkefjord Municipality in 1840, and his brother was mayor in 1843.

In 1830 he bought some land at Øysanden near the Fedafjorden (in the present-day Kvinesdal Municipality), establishing a farm. According to Wollert Keilhau, "he did rational farming, which one then got to see for the first time in those corners of the country". . He wrote articles on agriculture, and was awarded for one of his articles by the Royal Norwegian Society for Development in 1837 and by the Highland and Agricultural Society of Scotland in 1851. Following the crisis for herring fishery in Flekkefjord in the 1830s, he added a brewery and a distillery. However, the distillery was unpopular among the local populace, and went defunct after ten years. He finally pulled out of Flekkefjord's ship industry in 1854, and died in June 1881 in Kvinesdal.
