= Gyland Municipality =

Former municipality in Vest-Agder, Norway

Gyland Municipality Gyland herred
- Former municipality
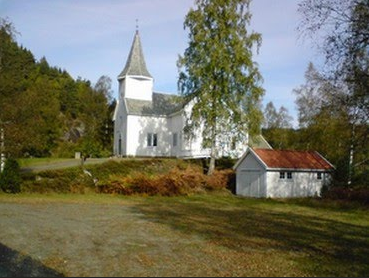
- View of the village church

- Vest-Agder within Norway

- Gyland within Vest-Agder
- Coordinates: 58°25′50″N 06°50′22″E
- Country: Norway
- County: Vest-Agder
- District: Lister
- Established: 1 Jan 1838
  - Created as: Formannskapsdistrikt
- Disestablished: Fall 1839
  - Succeeded by: Bakke Municipality
- Re-established: 1 Jan 1893
  - Preceded by: Bakke Municipality
- Disestablished: 1 Jan 1965
  - Succeeded by: Flekkefjord Municipality
- Administrative centre: Gyland

Government
  - Mayor (1946–1964): Alfred Tesaker

Area (upon dissolution)
  - Total: 181.7 km^{2} (70.2 sq mi)
  - Rank: #350 in Norway
- Highest elevation: 607 m (1,991 ft)

Population (1964)
  - Total: 688
  - Rank: #508 in Norway
  - Density: 3.8/km^{2} (9.8/sq mi)
  - Change (10 years): ▼ −23.6%

Official language
  - Norwegian form: Neutral
- Time zone: UTC+01:00 (CET)
  - Summer (DST): UTC+02:00 (CEST)
- ISO 3166 code: NO-1044

Gyland is a former municipality in the old Vest-Agder county, Norway. The 181.7-square-kilometre (70.2 sq mi) municipality existed very briefly from 1838 until 1839 and then it was re-created in 1893 and it existed until 1965. The area is now part of Flekkefjord Municipality in the traditional district of Lister in Agder county. The administrative centre was the village of Gyland where Gyland Church is located.

Prior to its dissolution in 1965, the 181.7-square-kilometre (70.2 sq mi) municipality was the 350th largest by area out of the 525 municipalities in Norway. Gyland Municipality was the 508th most populous municipality in Norway with a population of about 688. The municipality's population density was 3.8 inhabitants per square kilometre (9.8/sq mi) and its population had decreased by 23.6% over the previous 10-year period.

== General information ==
The parish of Gyland was established as a municipality on 1 January 1838 (see formannskapsdistrikt law), but due to its rural nature and small population it was almost immediately merged into the neighboring Bakke Municipality in the fall of 1839. On 31 December 1893, the Gyland area (population: 1,085) was separated (again) from Bakke Municipality to once again form its own municipality.

During the 1960s, there were many municipal mergers across Norway due to the work of the Schei Committee. On 1 January 1965, Nes Municipality was dissolved and the following areas were merged to form a new, larger Flekkefjord Municipality:

- the town of Flekkefjord (population: 3,163)
- all of Hidra Municipality (population: 1,277)
- all of Nes Municipality (population: 2,757)
- all of Gyland Municipality (population: 691)
- most of Bakke Municipality (population: 925), except for the Øksendal area which went to Sirdal Municipality

=== Name ===
The municipality (originally the parish) is named after the old Gyland farm (Old Norse: Gýjuland) since the first Gyland Church was built there. The meaning of the first element is uncertain. One possibility is that it comes from the word Gýja which is likely the old name for the local Gylandselva river. The old river name may have been derived from the Old High German word giwên which means "gape" or "gaping", in this sense referring to the gorges in the area. The other possibility is that it comes from the word gýgr which means "female troll" or "giantess". The last element is land which means "land" or "district".

=== Churches ===
The Church of Norway had one parish (sokn) within Gyland Municipality. At the time of the municipal dissolution, it was part of the Bakke prestegjeld and the Flekkefjord prosti (deanery) in the Diocese of Agder.

Churches in Gyland Municipality
Parish (sokn)	Church name	Location of the church	Year built
Gyland	Gyland Church	Gyland	1929

== Geography ==
The highest point in the municipality was the 607-metre (1,991 ft) tall mountain Høgheia, in the northern part of the municipality, near the border with Fjotland Municipality. Bakke Municipality is located to the west and north, Fjotland Municipality was located to the northeast, Kvinesdal Municipality was located to the southeast, Feda Municipality was located to the south, and Nes Municipality was located to the southwest.

== Government ==
While it existed, Gyland Municipality was responsible for primary education (through 10th grade), outpatient health services, senior citizen services, welfare and other social services, zoning, economic development, and municipal roads and utilities. The municipality was governed by a municipal council of directly elected representatives. The mayor was indirectly elected by a vote of the municipal council. The municipality was under the jurisdiction of the Flekkefjord District Court and the Agder Court of Appeal.

=== Municipal council ===
The municipal council (Herredsstyre) of Gyland Municipality was made up of 13 representatives that were elected to four year terms. The tables below show the historical composition of the council by political party.

Gyland herredsstyre 1963–1964
Party name (in Norwegian)	Number of representatives
Liberal Party (Venstre)	2
Local List(s) (Lokale lister)	11
Total number of members:	13
Note: On 1 January 1965, Gyland Municipality became part of Flekkefjord Municipality.

Gyland herredsstyre 1959–1963
Party name (in Norwegian)	Number of representatives
Liberal Party (Venstre)	2
Local List(s) (Lokale lister)	11
Total number of members:	13

Gyland herredsstyre 1955–1959
Party name (in Norwegian)	Number of representatives
Local List(s) (Lokale lister)	13
Total number of members:	13

Gyland herredsstyre 1951–1955
Party name (in Norwegian)	Number of representatives
Labour Party (Arbeiderpartiet)	1
Local List(s) (Lokale lister)	11
Total number of members:	12

Gyland herredsstyre 1947–1951
Party name (in Norwegian)	Number of representatives
Labour Party (Arbeiderpartiet)	1
Local List(s) (Lokale lister)	11
Total number of members:	12

Gyland herredsstyre 1945–1947
Party name (in Norwegian)	Number of representatives
Labour Party (Arbeiderpartiet)	1
Local List(s) (Lokale lister)	11
Total number of members:	12

Gyland herredsstyre 1937–1941*
Party name (in Norwegian)	Number of representatives
Labour Party (Arbeiderpartiet)	3
Joint List(s) of Non-Socialist Parties (Borgerlige Felleslister)	9
Total number of members:	12
Note: Due to the German occupation of Norway during World War II, no elections were held for new municipal councils until after the war ended in 1945.

=== Mayors ===
The mayor (Norwegian: ordfører) of Gyland Municipality was the political leader of the municipality and the chairperson of the municipal council. The following people have held this position:

- 1838–1839: Per Svendsen Nedland
- (1839-1893: Gyland was part of Bakke Municipality)
- 1894–1902: Tønnes Svendsen Hegland
- 1902–1902: Sigbjørn Larsen Nedland
- 1902–1908: Eirik Andersen Kvale
- 1908–1911: Sigbjørn Larsen Nedland
- 1911–1925: Eirik Andersen Kvale
- 1925–1943: Sven Fosdal
- 1945–1945: Lars F. Nuland
- 1946–1946: Gotfred Abelsnes
- 1946–1964: Alfred Tesaker

== See also ==
- List of former municipalities of Norway
