= Flekkefjord Municipality =

Municipality in Agder, Norway

Flekkefjord Municipality Flekkefjord kommune
- Municipality
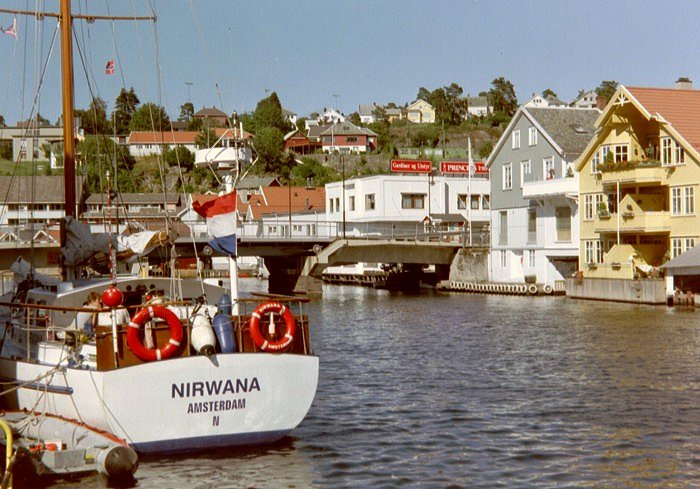
- View of a local harbour

- Coat of arms

- Agder within Norway

- Flekkefjord within Agder
- Coordinates: 58°19′38″N 06°40′00″E
- Country: Norway
- County: Agder
- District: Lister
- Established: 1 Jan 1838
  - Created as: Formannskapsdistrikt
- Administrative centre: Flekkefjord

Government
  - Mayor (2019): Torbjørn Klungland (FrP)

Area
  - Total: 544.09 km^{2} (210.07 sq mi)
  - Land: 481.61 km^{2} (185.95 sq mi)
  - Water: 62.48 km^{2} (24.12 sq mi) 11.5%
  - Rank: #197 in Norway
- Highest elevation: 683.03 m (2,240.9 ft)

Population (2026)
  - Total: 9,373
  - Rank: #122 in Norway
  - Density: 19.5/km^{2} (51/sq mi)
  - Change (10 years): ▲ +3%
- Demonym: Flekkefjæring

Official language
  - Norwegian form: Bokmål
- Time zone: UTC+01:00 (CET)
  - Summer (DST): UTC+02:00 (CEST)
- ISO 3166 code: NO-4207
- Website: Official website

Flekkefjord is a municipality in Agder county, Norway. It is located in the traditional district of Lister. The administrative centre of the municipality is the town of Flekkefjord. The villages of Sira, Gyland, Rasvåg, Kirkehavn, and Åna-Sira are located in Flekkefjord.

Flekkefjord is the westernmost municipality of the geographical region of Sørlandet, and it is located approximately midway between the cities of Kristiansand and Stavanger. The European route E39 and the Sørlandet Line railway both run through the municipality.

The 544.09-square-kilometre (210.07 sq mi) municipality is the 197th largest by area out of the 357 municipalities in Norway. Flekkefjord Municipality is the 122nd most populous municipality in Norway with a population of 9,373. The municipality's population density is 19.5 inhabitants per square kilometre (51/sq mi) and its population has increased by 3% over the previous 10-year period.

== General information ==
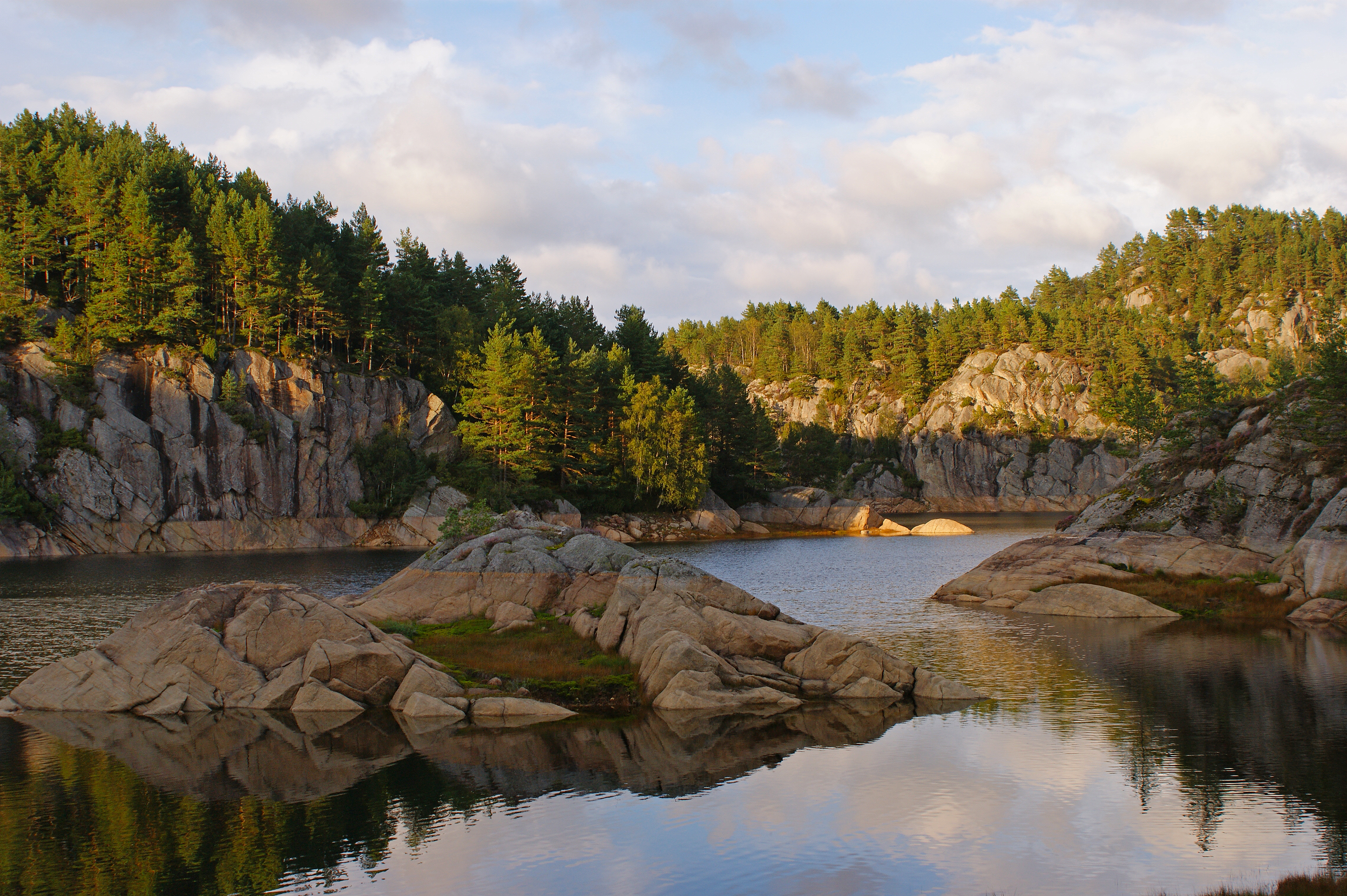
Flekkefjord landscape

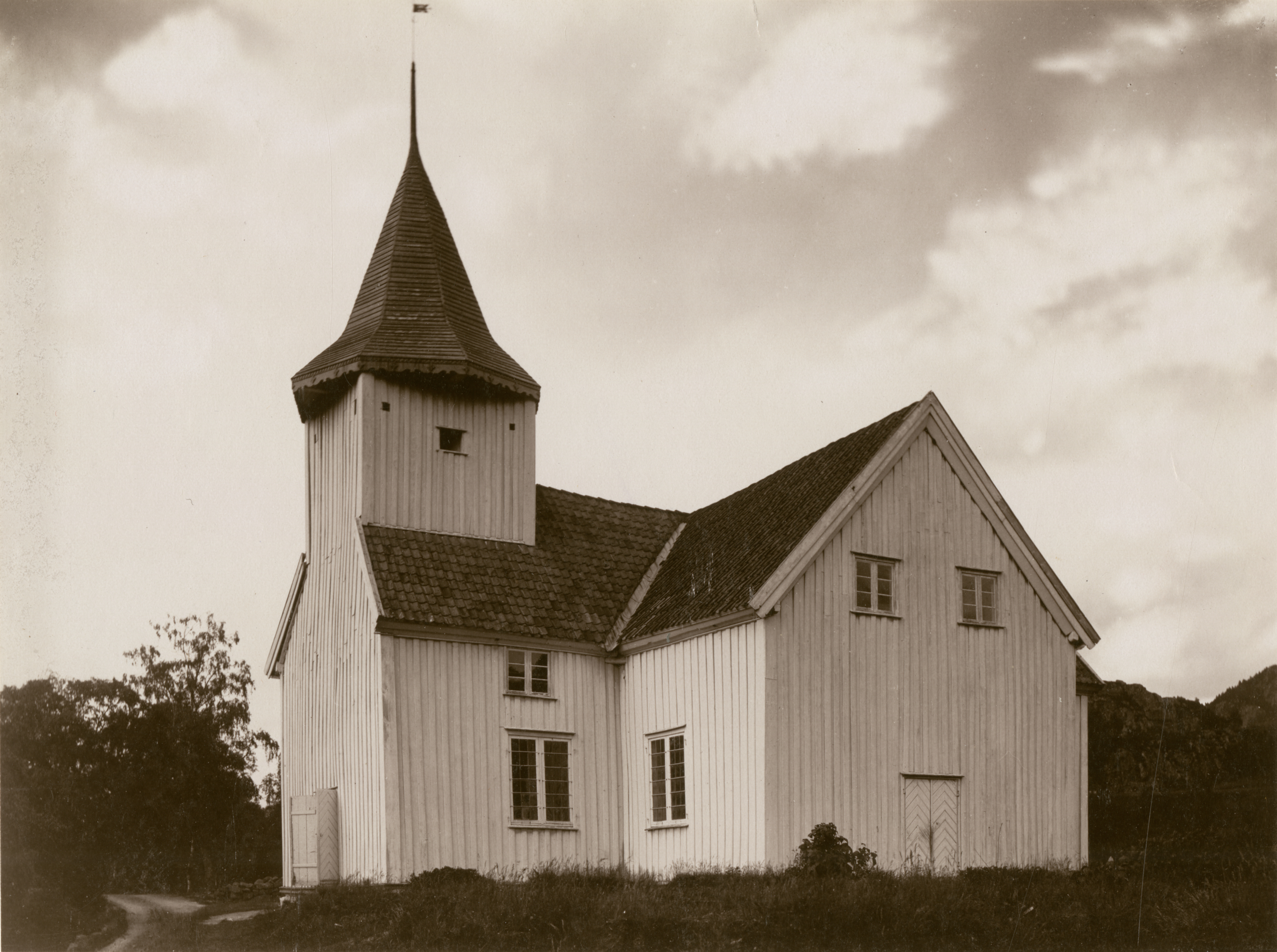
View of the Bakke Church in Sira

The small town of Flekkefjord was established as a municipality on 1 January 1838 (see formannskapsdistrikt law). In 1942, a neighboring part of Nes Municipality (population: 377) was transferred into the town of Flekkefjord.

During the 1960s, there were many municipal mergers across Norway due to the work of the Schei Committee. On 1 January 1965, the following areas were merged to form a new, larger Flekkefjord Municipality:

- the town of Flekkefjord (population: 3,163)
- all of Hidra Municipality (population: 1,277)
- all of Nes Municipality (population: 2,757)
- all of Gyland Municipality (population: 691)
- most of Bakke Municipality (population: 925), except for the Øksendal area which went to Sirdal Municipality

On 1 January 1987, the Virak and Espetveit areas in northern Flekkefjord Municipality (population: 41) were transferred to Sirdal Municipality.

Historically, this municipality was part of the old Vest-Agder county. On 1 January 2020, the municipality became a part of the newly-formed Agder county (after Aust-Agder and Vest-Agder counties were merged).

=== Name ===
The municipality (and town) is named after the local fjord called the Flekkefjorden. The first element of the name comes from the name of the old Flikke farm (Old Norse: Flikkar) since it is located near the fjord. That name is the plural form of the word flikkar which has an unknown meaning.

=== Coat of arms ===
The coat of arms for Flekkefjord are rather old (compared with most Norwegian municipal arms). They were granted around the year 1855. The blazon is "Or, a sailing ship above four barrulets wavy gules". This means the arms have a field (background) has a tincture of Or which means it is commonly colored yellow, but if it is made out of metal, then gold is used. The charge is a pilot boat above four wavy stripes symbolizing the sea. The arms have a mural crown above the shield. The arms were originally proposed in 1855 and they were described as a pilot boat on the sea. It specifically is like the pilot boats that Colin Archer made during that time period. The original proposal showed a boat on a very natural sea, using all in natural colours. The present shape of the boat and the more heraldically correct arms date from 1899. The arms were designed by an unknown designer. The municipal flag has the same design as the coat of arms. In 2023, the design of the arms was updated slightly. The flag on the boat was made to look more wavy, a single black stripe is on the sails, and a pilot is more visible at the rear of the boat.

=== Churches ===
The Church of Norway has four parishes (sokn) within Flekkefjord Municipality. It is part of the Lister og Mandal prosti (deanery) in the Diocese of Agder og Telemark.

Churches in Flekkefjord Municipality
Parish (sokn)	Church name	Location of the church	Year built
Bakke	Bakke Church	Sira	1670
Flekkefjord	Flekkefjord Church	Flekkefjord	1833
Gyland	Gyland Church	Nuland (near Gyland)	1929
Hidra	Hidra Church	Kirkehamn	1854

== Geography ==
The municipality is located in southwestern Agder county, along the border with Rogaland county and the North Sea to the southwest. It is bounded by Sokndal Municipality and Lund Municipality (in Rogaland county) to the west across the river Sira, by Sirdal Municipality to the north, and by Kvinesdal Municipality to the east.

The town of Flekkefjord is located near the southern coast of the municipality in a fjord. It straddles the narrow sound which connects the Flekkefjorden to Grisefjorden. The port is ideal due to the tiny difference in tides experienced here. This is a result of its close proximity to the amphidromic point outside Eigersund Municipality.

The lakes Kumlevollvatnet, Lundevatn, Selura, and Sirdalsvatnet are located in Flekkefjord. The southern coast is dominated by the Listafjorden and Fedafjorden with the large inhabited islands of Hidra and Andabeløyna lying in the Listafjorden. The highest point in the municipality is the 683.03-metre (2,240.9 ft) tall mountain Store Tomlungen.

=== Climate ===
Climate data for Flekkefjord 1961-90
Month	Jan	Feb	Mar	Apr	May	Jun	Jul	Aug	Sep	Oct	Nov	Dec	Year
Daily mean °C (°F)	−1.0 (30.2)	−1.3 (29.7)	1.0 (33.8)	4.5 (40.1)	10.0 (50.0)	13.5 (56.3)	15.0 (59.0)	14.5 (58.1)	10.8 (51.4)	7.6 (45.7)	3.0 (37.4)	−0.5 (31.1)	6.4 (43.5)
Average precipitation mm (inches)	189 (7.4)	133 (5.2)	147 (5.8)	91 (3.6)	102 (4.0)	100 (3.9)	119 (4.7)	158 (6.2)	208 (8.2)	250 (9.8)	253 (10.0)	215 (8.5)	1,965 (77.4)
Average precipitation days (≥ 1 mm)	16.1	10.9	13.7	10.4	11.5	10.0	10.9	13.0	16.1	17.1	18.6	16.3	164.6
Source: Norwegian Meteorological Institute

== History ==
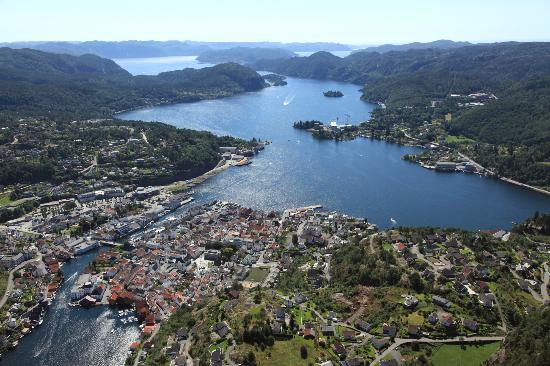
View of the town of Flekkefjord

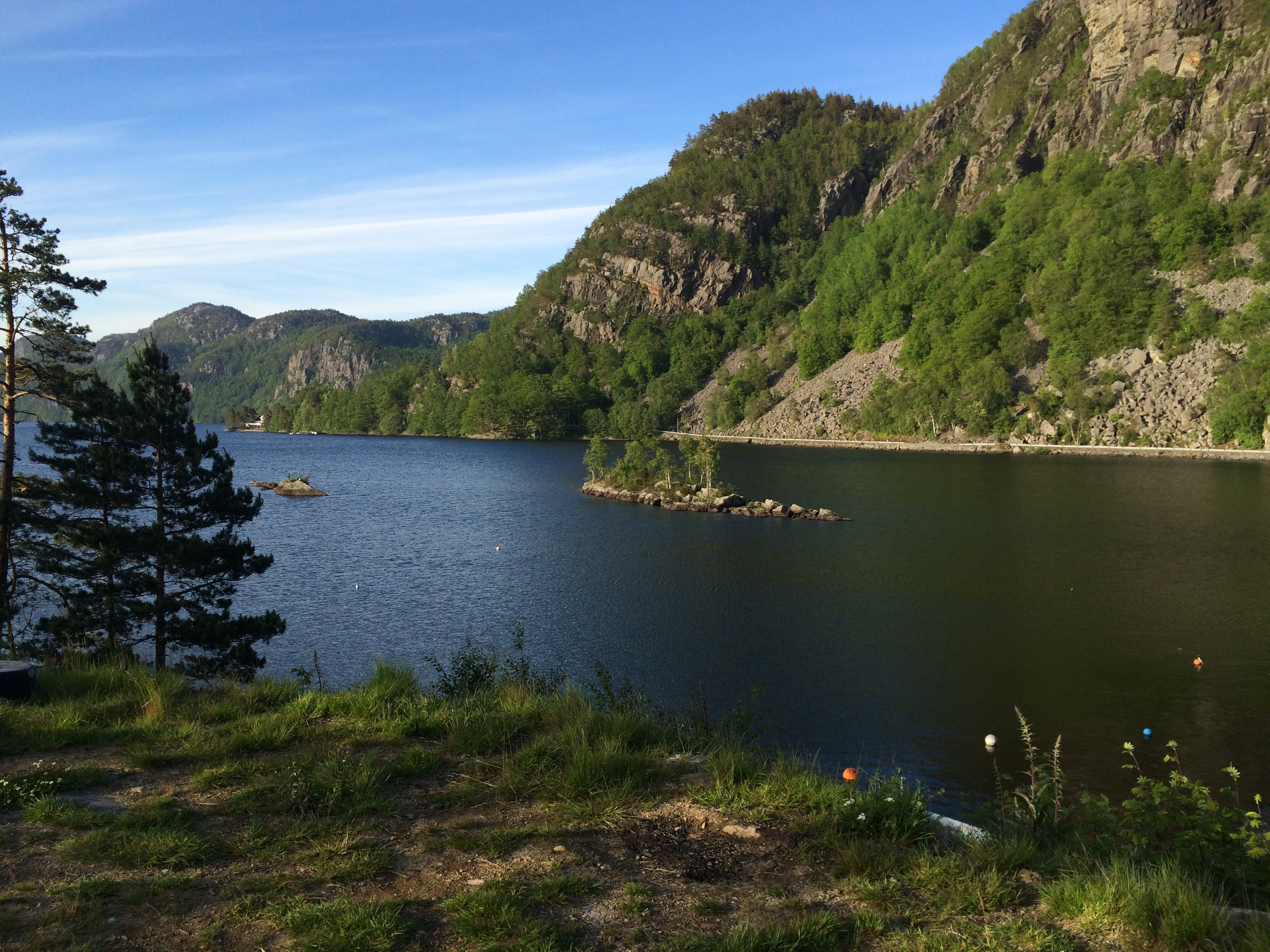
View of the lake Selura

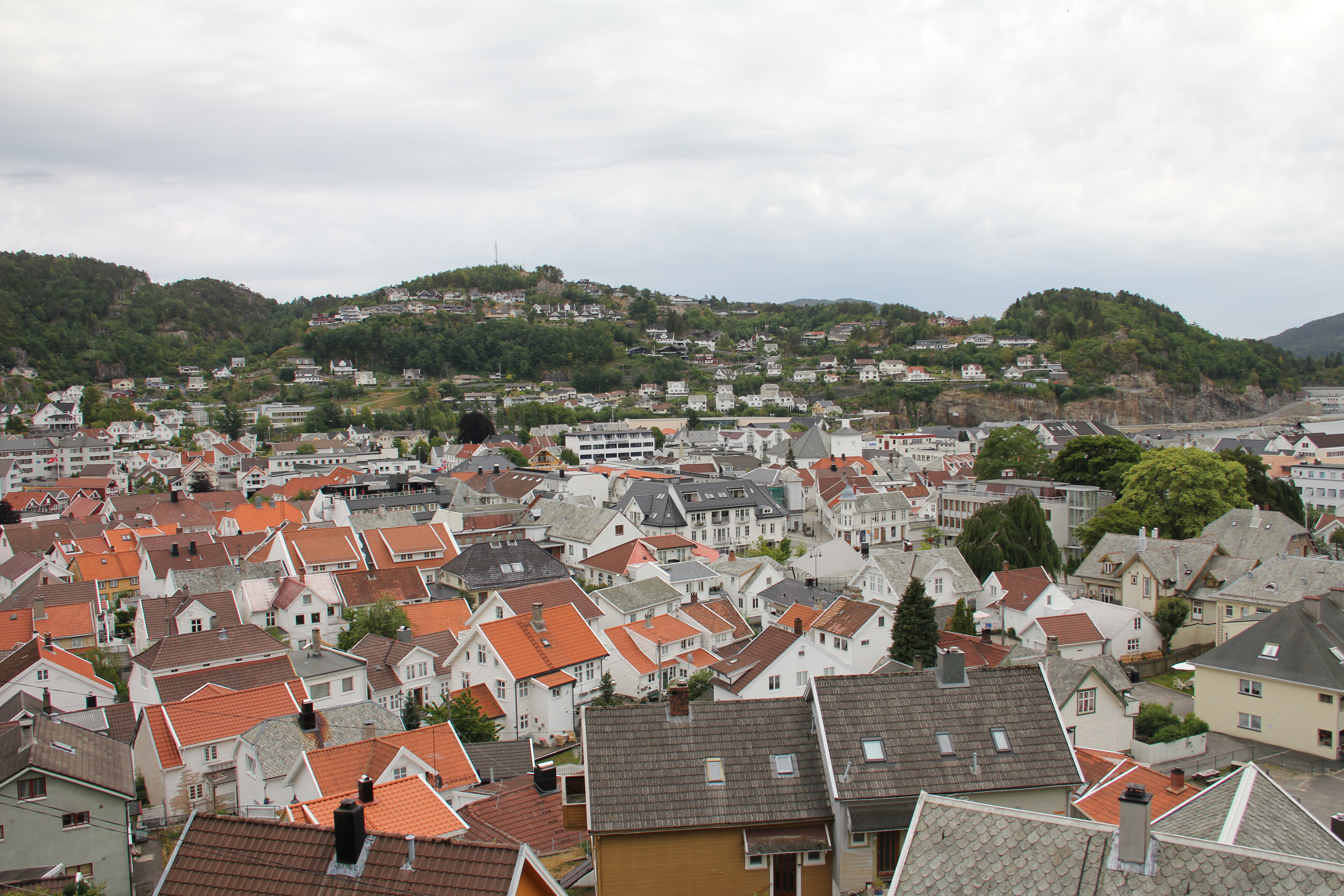
The town of Flekkefjord

Flekkefjord was a landing place from early times. It was mentioned as a town as early as 1580. In 1589, James VI of Scotland landed there before travelling overland via Tønsberg to Oslo, where he married Princess Anne of Denmark, daughter of Frederick II. When Kristiansand was founded in 1641, Christian IV wanted to assure the economic survival of his new city by moving Flekkefjord residents there. Twice it was sentenced to extinction by royal decree. But many of the Flekkefjord inhabitants remained and continued to trade.

Norway's plentiful stone was a Flekkefjord commodity. In 1736 over 300 Dutch ships are reported to have carried paving stones from Flekkefjord. By 1750 the herring fishery began in earnest, such that herring and timber dominated the trade. In the 1750s Flekkefjord was the most important Norwegian herring export harbor.

In 1760 Flekkefjord petitioned Frederik V to grant a town charter. At that time several ships were home ported there and both sailors and herring fishermen had their homes in this small town that was not officially recognized. Barrel making (cooperage) was also an important local trade that served the fishing fleet.

During the Napoleonic Wars Flekkefjord found a new life as a smugglers port, exporting oak to the Napoleon-occupied Netherlands during the period prior to 1807. The unusual tidal condition, the local timber abundance, and a long-term relationship with the Dutch were the reasons behind Flekkefjord's then serving as a smuggler's headquarters. They specialized in the lucrative oak trade, the warship timber in those days. Ships could come and leave Flekkefjord at any hour of the day, without concern for the tides.

Prior to 1807, Denmark-Norway had followed a policy of armed neutrality, using its naval forces only to protect trade flowing within, into, and out of Danish and Norwegian waters. But this changed for the last phase of the Napoleonic Wars when, in the Battle of Copenhagen in 1807, the British preemptively captured large portions of the Danish naval fleet to prevent the French from doing the same. As a result, the Danish government declared war and built small gunboats in large numbers to attack the British. The Gunboat War (1807–1814) was the title given to naval conflict between Denmark-Norway against the British navy. It was natural for Flekkefjord to move from a smuggler's haven to blockade runner's headquarters. The unusual tides there were unknown to the British warships that were blockading the Norwegian coast against Napoleon-supporting ships and this provided the blockade runners a considerable advantage.

After the war the Dutch maintained a strong presence in Flekkefjord, and continued exporting oak and pine. The pine was used mainly to make foundations for the boom in Amsterdam house construction; as a result most of Amsterdam's houses from the 19th century are constructed of pines from Flekkefjord exporters. A section of Flekkefjord called 'Hollenderbyen' (town of the Dutch) dates from the 18th century.

Xenotime, a rare yttrium phosphate mineral whose chemical formula is YPO_{4}, was discovered in 1832 at Hidra (Hitterø), Flekkefjord.

The herring fisheries deserted the coast in 1838, depriving Flekkefjord residents of their main export. Tanning replaced fishing and by 1866 five tanneries were operating in Flekkefjord.

The Flekkefjord Line railway ran between Sira and Flekkefjord from 1904 to 1990.

Flekkefjord and nearby areas are served by Sørlandet Hospital Flekkefjord that covers population needs for surgery, orthopedics, oncology, gynecology and obstetrics.

== Government ==
Flekkefjord Municipality is responsible for primary education (through 10th grade), outpatient health services, senior citizen services, welfare and other social services, zoning, economic development, and municipal roads and utilities. The municipality is governed by a municipal council of directly elected representatives. The mayor is indirectly elected by a vote of the municipal council. The municipality is under the jurisdiction of the Agder District Court and the Agder Court of Appeal.

=== Municipal council ===
The municipal council (Kommunestyre) of Flekkefjord Municipality is made up of 35 representatives that are elected to four year terms. The tables below show the current and historical composition of the council by political party.

Flekkefjord kommunestyre 2023–2027
Party name (in Norwegian)	Number of representatives
Labour Party (Arbeiderpartiet)	3
Progress Party (Fremskrittspartiet)	14
Conservative Party (Høyre)	5
Christian Democratic Party (Kristelig Folkeparti)	5
Red Party (Rødt)	1
Centre Party (Senterpartiet)	2
Socialist Left Party (Sosialistisk Venstreparti)	2
Liberal Party (Venstre)	2
Flekkefjord's Well (Flekkefjords Vel)	1
Total number of members:	35

Flekkefjord kommunestyre 2019–2023
Party name (in Norwegian)	Number of representatives
Labour Party (Arbeiderpartiet)	4
Progress Party (Fremskrittspartiet)	6
Conservative Party (Høyre)	8
Christian Democratic Party (Kristelig Folkeparti)	5
Red Party (Rødt)	1
Centre Party (Senterpartiet)	7
Socialist Left Party (Sosialistisk Venstreparti)	2
Liberal Party (Venstre)	2
Total number of members:	35

Flekkefjord kommunestyre 2015–2019
Party name (in Norwegian)	Number of representatives
Labour Party (Arbeiderpartiet)	6
Progress Party (Fremskrittspartiet)	6
Green Party (Miljøpartiet De Grønne)	1
Conservative Party (Høyre)	8
Christian Democratic Party (Kristelig Folkeparti)	5
Centre Party (Senterpartiet)	4
Socialist Left Party (Sosialistisk Venstreparti)	1
Liberal Party (Venstre)	4
Total number of members:	35

Flekkefjord kommunestyre 2011–2015
Party name (in Norwegian)	Number of representatives
Labour Party (Arbeiderpartiet)	6
Progress Party (Fremskrittspartiet)	5
Conservative Party (Høyre)	9
Christian Democratic Party (Kristelig Folkeparti)	6
Centre Party (Senterpartiet)	3
Socialist Left Party (Sosialistisk Venstreparti)	1
Liberal Party (Venstre)	5
Total number of members:	35

Flekkefjord kommunestyre 2007–2011
Party name (in Norwegian)	Number of representatives
Labour Party (Arbeiderpartiet)	5
Progress Party (Fremskrittspartiet)	6
Conservative Party (Høyre)	7
Christian Democratic Party (Kristelig Folkeparti)	6
Centre Party (Senterpartiet)	3
Socialist Left Party (Sosialistisk Venstreparti)	2
Liberal Party (Venstre)	6
Total number of members:	35

Flekkefjord kommunestyre 2003–2007
Party name (in Norwegian)	Number of representatives
Labour Party (Arbeiderpartiet)	6
Progress Party (Fremskrittspartiet)	4
Conservative Party (Høyre)	7
Christian Democratic Party (Kristelig Folkeparti)	7
The Democrats (Demokratene)	1
Centre Party (Senterpartiet)	3
Socialist Left Party (Sosialistisk Venstreparti)	3
Liberal Party (Venstre)	4
Total number of members:	35

Flekkefjord kommunestyre 1999–2003
Party name (in Norwegian)	Number of representatives
Labour Party (Arbeiderpartiet)	7
Progress Party (Fremskrittspartiet)	6
Conservative Party (Høyre)	6
Christian Democratic Party (Kristelig Folkeparti)	8
Centre Party (Senterpartiet)	3
Liberal Party (Venstre)	5
Total number of members:	35

Flekkefjord kommunestyre 1995–1999
Party name (in Norwegian)	Number of representatives
Labour Party (Arbeiderpartiet)	8
Progress Party (Fremskrittspartiet)	3
Conservative Party (Høyre)	7
Christian Democratic Party (Kristelig Folkeparti)	8
Centre Party (Senterpartiet)	5
Liberal Party (Venstre)	4
Total number of members:	35

Flekkefjord kommunestyre 1991–1995
Party name (in Norwegian)	Number of representatives
Labour Party (Arbeiderpartiet)	8
Progress Party (Fremskrittspartiet)	4
Conservative Party (Høyre)	9
Christian Democratic Party (Kristelig Folkeparti)	11
Centre Party (Senterpartiet)	6
Socialist Left Party (Sosialistisk Venstreparti)	3
Liberal Party (Venstre)	4
Total number of members:	45

Flekkefjord kommunestyre 1987–1991
Party name (in Norwegian)	Number of representatives
Labour Party (Arbeiderpartiet)	11
Progress Party (Fremskrittspartiet)	5
Conservative Party (Høyre)	10
Christian Democratic Party (Kristelig Folkeparti)	10
Centre Party (Senterpartiet)	3
Socialist Left Party (Sosialistisk Venstreparti)	1
Joint list of the Liberal Party (Venstre) and Liberal People's Party (Liberale Folkepartiet)	4
Cross-party local list (Tverrpolitisk kommuneliste)	1
Total number of members:	45

Flekkefjord kommunestyre 1983–1987
Party name (in Norwegian)	Number of representatives
Labour Party (Arbeiderpartiet)	11
Progress Party (Fremskrittspartiet)	3
Conservative Party (Høyre)	13
Christian Democratic Party (Kristelig Folkeparti)	11
Liberal People's Party (Liberale Folkepartiet)	1
Centre Party (Senterpartiet)	3
Socialist Left Party (Sosialistisk Venstreparti)	1
Liberal Party (Venstre)	2
Total number of members:	45

Flekkefjord kommunestyre 1979–1983
Party name (in Norwegian)	Number of representatives
Labour Party (Arbeiderpartiet)	10
Conservative Party (Høyre)	14
Christian Democratic Party (Kristelig Folkeparti)	10
New People's Party (Nye Folkepartiet)	2
Centre Party (Senterpartiet)	3
Socialist Left Party (Sosialistisk Venstreparti)	1
Liberal Party (Venstre)	3
The non-party common list (Den upolitiske fellesliste)	2
Total number of members:	45

Flekkefjord kommunestyre 1975–1979
Party name (in Norwegian)	Number of representatives
Labour Party (Arbeiderpartiet)	9
Conservative Party (Høyre)	9
Christian Democratic Party (Kristelig Folkeparti)	12
New People's Party (Nye Folkepartiet)	5
Centre Party (Senterpartiet)	6
Socialist Left Party (Sosialistisk Venstreparti)	1
Liberal Party (Venstre)	3
Total number of members:	45

Flekkefjord kommunestyre 1971–1975
Party name (in Norwegian)	Number of representatives
Labour Party (Arbeiderpartiet)	14
Conservative Party (Høyre)	7
Christian Democratic Party (Kristelig Folkeparti)	8
Centre Party (Senterpartiet)	6
Liberal Party (Venstre)	10
Total number of members:	45

Flekkefjord kommunestyre 1967–1971
Party name (in Norwegian)	Number of representatives
Labour Party (Arbeiderpartiet)	12
Conservative Party (Høyre)	8
Christian Democratic Party (Kristelig Folkeparti)	7
Centre Party (Senterpartiet)	4
Socialist People's Party (Sosialistisk Folkeparti)	1
Liberal Party (Venstre)	12
Total number of members:	45

Flekkefjord bystyre 1963–1967
Party name (in Norwegian)	Number of representatives
Labour Party (Arbeiderpartiet)	7
Conservative Party (Høyre)	5
Christian Democratic Party (Kristelig Folkeparti)	2
Liberal Party (Venstre)	5
Local List(s) (Lokale lister)	2
Total number of members:	21
Note: On 1 January 1965, Flekkefjord Municipality was enlarged through a large municipal merger.

Flekkefjord bystyre 1959–1963
Party name (in Norwegian)	Number of representatives
Labour Party (Arbeiderpartiet)	7
Conservative Party (Høyre)	5
Christian Democratic Party (Kristelig Folkeparti)	2
Liberal Party (Venstre)	7
Total number of members:	21

Flekkefjord bystyre 1955–1959
Party name (in Norwegian)	Number of representatives
Labour Party (Arbeiderpartiet)	8
Conservative Party (Høyre)	5
Christian Democratic Party (Kristelig Folkeparti)	2
Liberal Party (Venstre)	6
Total number of members:	21

Flekkefjord bystyre 1951–1955
Party name (in Norwegian)	Number of representatives
Labour Party (Arbeiderpartiet)	7
Conservative Party (Høyre)	5
Christian Democratic Party (Kristelig Folkeparti)	3
Liberal Party (Venstre)	5
Total number of members:	20

Flekkefjord bystyre 1947–1951
Party name (in Norwegian)	Number of representatives
Labour Party (Arbeiderpartiet)	7
Conservative Party (Høyre)	6
Christian Democratic Party (Kristelig Folkeparti)	2
Liberal Party (Venstre)	4
Local List(s) (Lokale lister)	1
Total number of members:	20

Flekkefjord bystyre 1945–1947
Party name (in Norwegian)	Number of representatives
Labour Party (Arbeiderpartiet)	7
Conservative Party (Høyre)	4
Christian Democratic Party (Kristelig Folkeparti)	3
Liberal Party (Venstre)	5
Local List(s) (Lokale lister)	1
Total number of members:	20

Flekkefjord bystyre 1937–1941*
Party name (in Norwegian)	Number of representatives
Labour Party (Arbeiderpartiet)	5
Conservative Party (Høyre)	4
Liberal Party (Venstre)	6
Local List(s) (Lokale lister)	5
Total number of members:	20
Note: Due to the German occupation of Norway during World War II, no elections were held for new municipal councils until after the war ended in 1945.

Flekkefjord bystyre 1934–1937
Party name (in Norwegian)	Number of representatives
Labour Party (Arbeiderpartiet)	4
Temperance Party (Avholdspartiet)	2
Conservative Party (Høyre)	5
Nasjonal Samling Party (Nasjonal Samling)	1
Liberal Party (Venstre)	4
Local List(s) (Lokale lister)	4
Total number of members:	20

=== Parliamentary representation ===
After Flekkefjord acquired market town status in 1842, it also became a constituency for elections to the Parliament of Norway. The first representative was elected in 1845: Gerhard Heiberg Garmann. He served for three years before Nils Elias Børresen was elected. He served until 1863, when deputy Johan Andreas Kraft took over for one year. Knud Geelmuyden Fleischer Maartmann served from 1865 to 1866 and 1868 to 1869, and Elias Didrichsen served from 1871 to 1888, interrupted by Thorvald Olsen who served from 1877 through 1879. Niels Eyde, Jakob Stang, Sivert Hanssen-Sunde and Hans Sivert Jacobsen served one three-year term each between 1889 and 1900. Then, Cornelius Bernhard Hanssen served from 1900 to 1921, interrupted by Bernhard Severin Sannerud in the years 1916 through 1918. A law change in 1919, Flekkefjord was no longer a constituency of its own; from then it was a part of the combined constituency Market towns of Vest-Agder and Rogaland counties.

=== Mayors ===
The mayor (Norwegian: ordfører) of Flekkefjord Municipality was the political leader of the municipality and the chairperson of the municipal council. Historically, the mayors in Flekkefjord have typically served for only one year going back to 1838 when local government was established.

Of the notable early mayors were Jens Henrik Beer (who also served in Parliament before Flekkefjord became its own constituency) in 1840 and Anders Beer in 1843. Many members of Parliament also served as mayors: J. A. Kraft in 1842, 1858 and 1859; Børresen in 1846, 1849, 1850, 1852 and 1862; Didrichsen from 1853 to 1857, 1863 to 1870, 1878 to 1879 and 1883 to 1888; Jacobsen in 1889; Hanssen-Sunde from 1893 to 1899; Sannerud from 1906 to 1909 and in 1917; and C. B. Hanssen in 1933, 1936 and 1937.

The following people have held this position:

- 1838–1838: Ebbe Dreier
- 1839–1839: Anders Tjørsvaag
- 1840–1840: Jens Henrik Beer
- 1841–1841: L.L. Ross
- 1842–1842: Johan Andreas Kraft
- 1843–1843: Anders Beer
- 1844–1844: L.L. Ross
- 1845–1845: J. Saxe
- 1846–1847: Nils Elias Børresen
- 1848–1848: Johan Christian Stephanson
- 1849–1850: Nils Elias Børresen
- 1851–1851: Johan Christian Stephanson
- 1852–1852: Nils Elias Børresen
- 1853–1857: Elias Didrichsen
- 1858–1859: Johan Andreas Kraft
- 1860–1860: B.L. Søyland
- 1861–1861: Inspector Engh
- 1862–1862: Nils Elias Børresen
- 1863–1870: Elias Didrichsen
- 1871–1877: Hans H.S. Sunde
- 1878–1879: Elias Didrichsen
- 1880–1882: Hans H.S. Sunde
- 1883–1888: Elias Didrichsen
- 1889–1889: Hans Sivert Jacobsen
- 1890–1892: Ole Z. Torkildsen
- 1893–1899: Sivert Hanssen-Sunde
- 1900–1900: T. Knudsen
- 1901–1904: C.T. Berg
- 1905–1905: J. Olsby
- 1906–1909: Bernhard Severin Sannerud
- 1910–1913: J.P.M. Eyde
- 1914–1916: S. Brække
- 1918–1918: S. Brække
- 1919–1919: H.T. Nygaard
- 1920–1922: Wilhelm E. Kaurin
- 1923–1924: Børge Ask
- 1925–1925: Olav Just
- 1926–1928: Wilhelm E. Kaurin
- 1929–1931: T.V.H. Undhammer
- 1932–1932: Wilhelm E. Kaurin
- 1933–1933: Cornelius Bernhard Hanssen
- 1934–1934: T.V.H. Undhammer
- 1935–1935: Olav Just
- 1936–1937: Cornelius Bernhard Hanssen
- 1938–1938: Olav Just
- 1939–1939: Wilhelm E. Kaurin
- 1940–1940: Olav Just
- 1945–1945: Olav Just
- 1946–1947: Gustav Selstad
- 1948–1948: Jens Smith Sunde
- 1949–1949: Sverre Fredhall
- 1950–1951: Olaf Søyland
- 1952–1959: Jakob Modal
- 1960–1963: Magnus Tonstad
- 1964–1967: Jakob Modal
- 1968–1975: Petter J. Peersen
- 1976–1987: Kjell Svindland (KrF)
- 1988–1989: Sigmund Kroslid (KrF)
- 1990–1991: Jan Østreim
- 1992–1995: Egil Nordmann Eek
- 1995–2007: Sigmund Kroslid (KrF)
- 2007–2011: Reidar Gausdal (V)
- 2011–2019: Jan Sigbjørnsen (H)
- 2019–present: Torbjørn Klungland (FrP)

== Twin towns – sister cities ==
Flekkefjord has sister city agreements with the following places:

- Bollnäs, Sweden (1950)
- Burntisland, Scotland, UK (1946)
- Elbow Lake, United States (1973)
- Kankaanpää, Finland (1950)
- Misburg-Anderten (Hanover), Germany (1971)
- Morsø, Denmark (1950)

== Notable people ==
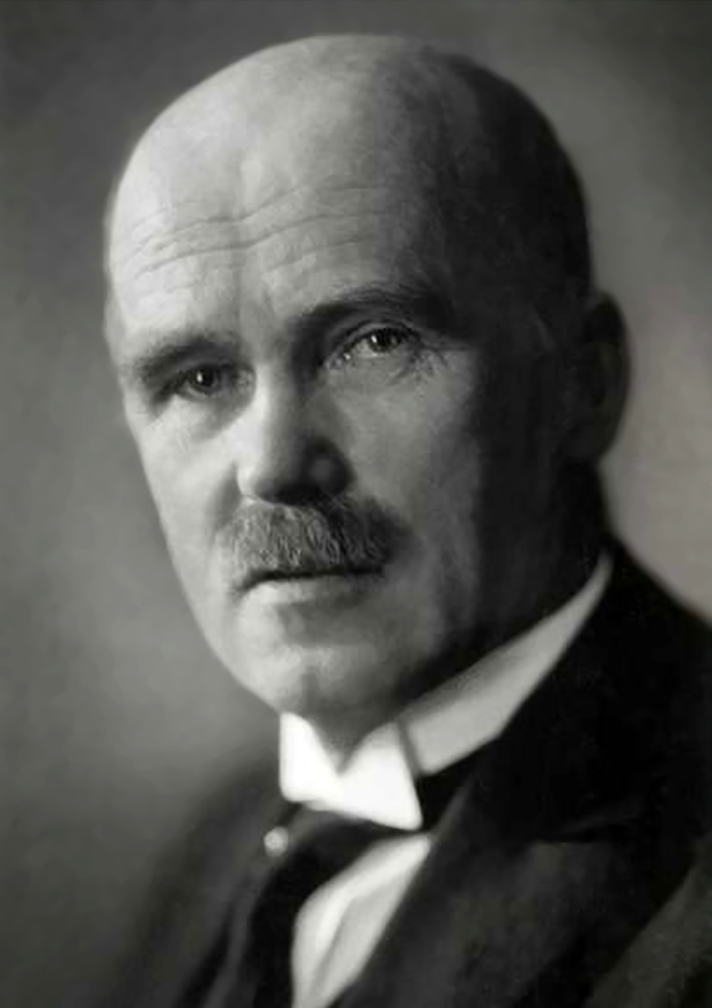
Anders Beer Wilse, 1935

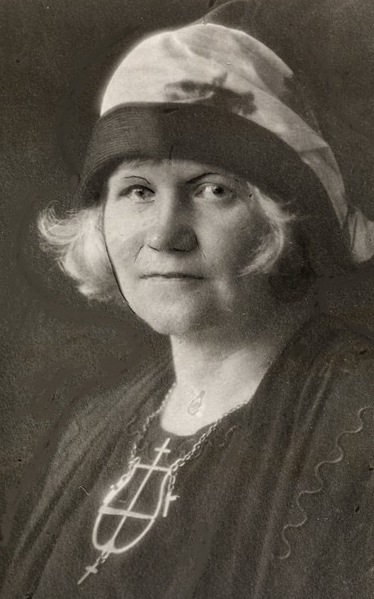
Marta Steinsvik, 1935

- Jens Henrik Beer Sr. (1731–1808), a ship-owner, sawmill owner, and merchant
- Jens Henrik Beer (1799–1881), a ship-owner, sawmill owner, farmer, and politician
- Anders Beer (1801–1863), a Norwegian ship-owner, tanner, and agriculturalist
- Marie Aarestrup (1826–1919), a painter who specialized in genre and portrait painting
- Peter Waage (1833–1900), a chemist and academic who developed the law of mass action
- Anders Beer Wilse (1865–1949), a photographer of natural sceneries and people at work
- Marta Steinsvik (1877–1950), an author who promoted women's rights, Nynorsk, and theology
- Gudmund Seland (1907–1996), a Norwegian resistance member and Mayor of Nes
- Nils Fuglesang (1918–1944), a Supermarine Spitfire pilot who escaped from Stalag Luft III, was recaptured, and shot
- Gunvald Tomstad (1918–1970), a major agent of the British SIS and resistance member
- Bitten Modal (1940–2008), a journalist, writer, and feminist
- Kåre Drangsholt (1941–1983), a boat designer and manufacturer of Draco boats
- Sverre Anker Ousdal (born 1944-2026), an actor
- Eva Lundgren (born 1947), a Norwegian-Swedish sociologist, re. violence against women
- Arnfinn Moland (born 1951), a historian, long jumper, and triple jumper
- Tove Pettersen (born 1962 on Hidra), a feminist philosopher
- Boye Brogeland (born 1973), a professional bridge player

=== Sport ===
- Olaf Søyland (born 1952), a sprint canoer who competed at the 1976 Summer Olympics
- Einar Rasmussen (born 1956), a sprint canoeist who was a medallist at several World Championships
- Svein Egil Solvang (born 1968), a sprint canoer who competed at the 1988 Summer Olympics
- Anne Tønnessen (born 1974), a footballer and team gold medallist at the 2000 Summer Olympics
- Eirik Verås Larsen (born 1976), a sprint kayaker and medallist at three Olympics

== See also ==
- Flekkefjord Dampskipsselskap
- Flekkefjords Budstikke
