= Sira, Norway =

Village in Flekkefjord Municipality, Norway

Sira
- Village
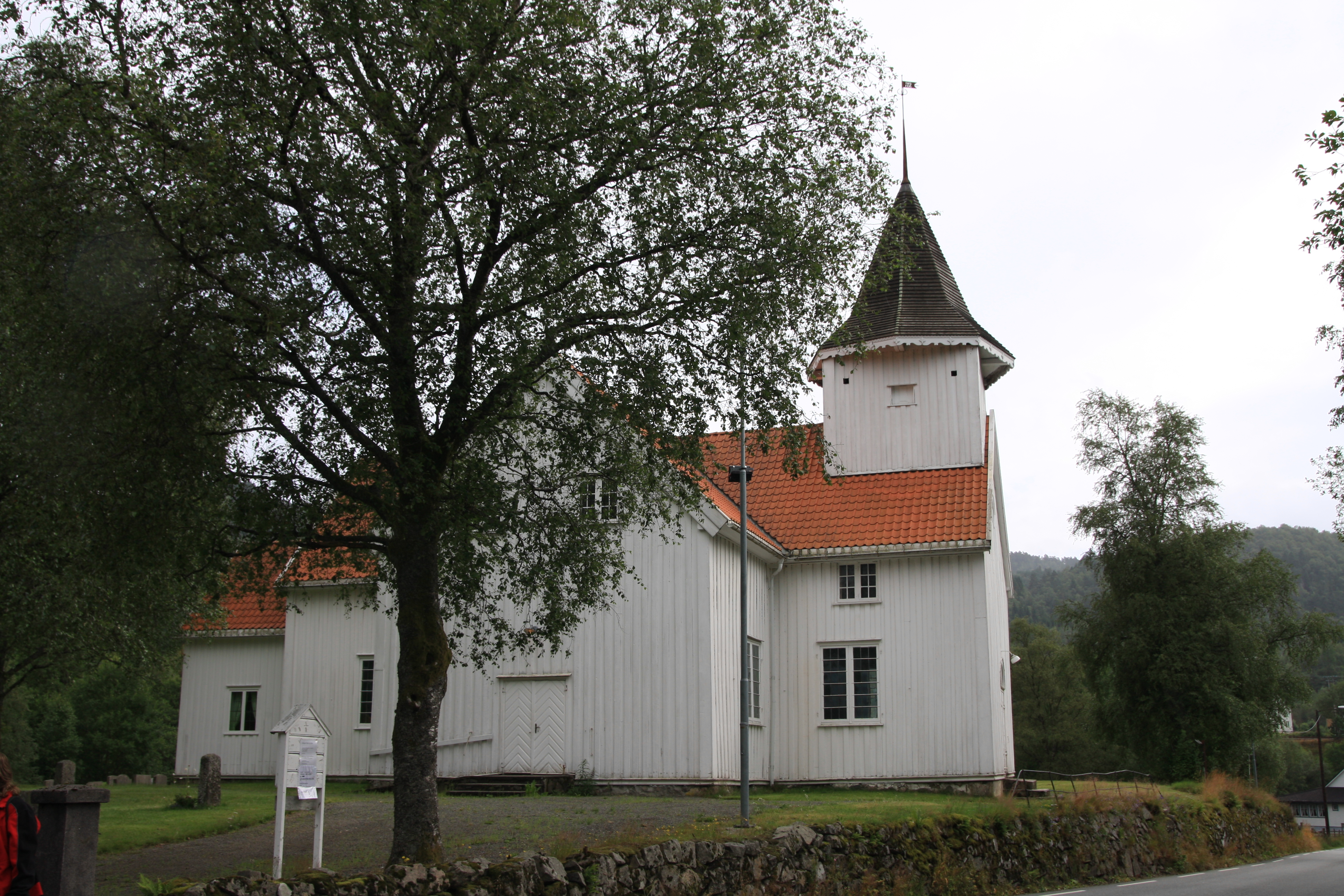
- View of the village church
- Interactive map of Sira
- Coordinates: 58.42055°N 6.66299°E
- Country: Norway
- Region: Southern Norway
- County: Agder
- District: Lister
- Municipality: Flekkefjord Municipality

Area
  - Total: 0.65 km^{2} (0.25 sq mi)
- Elevation: 77 m (253 ft)

Population (2025)
  - Total: 591
  - Density: 909/km^{2} (2,350/sq mi)
- Time zone: UTC+01:00 (CET)
  - Summer (DST): UTC+02:00 (CEST)
- Post Code: 4438 Sira

Sira is a village in Flekkefjord Municipality in Agder county, Norway. The village is located immediately east of the county border of Agder and Rogaland. The European route E39 highway passes by the village and the Sørlandet Line runs right through the village, stopping at Sira Station.

The 0.65-square-kilometre (160-acre) village has a population (2025) of 591 and a population density of 909 inhabitants per square kilometre (2,350/sq mi).

Sira lies along the Sira River, just south of the lake Sirdalsvatnet. The river and lake are both a part of the Sira-Kvina hydropower system. Bakke Church lies at the southern end of the village.

== History ==
Sira was the administrative centre of the old Bakke Municipality which was dissolved and merged into Flekkefjord Municipality in 1965.
