= Bakke Church (Agder) =

Church in Agder, Norway

- Bakke kirke
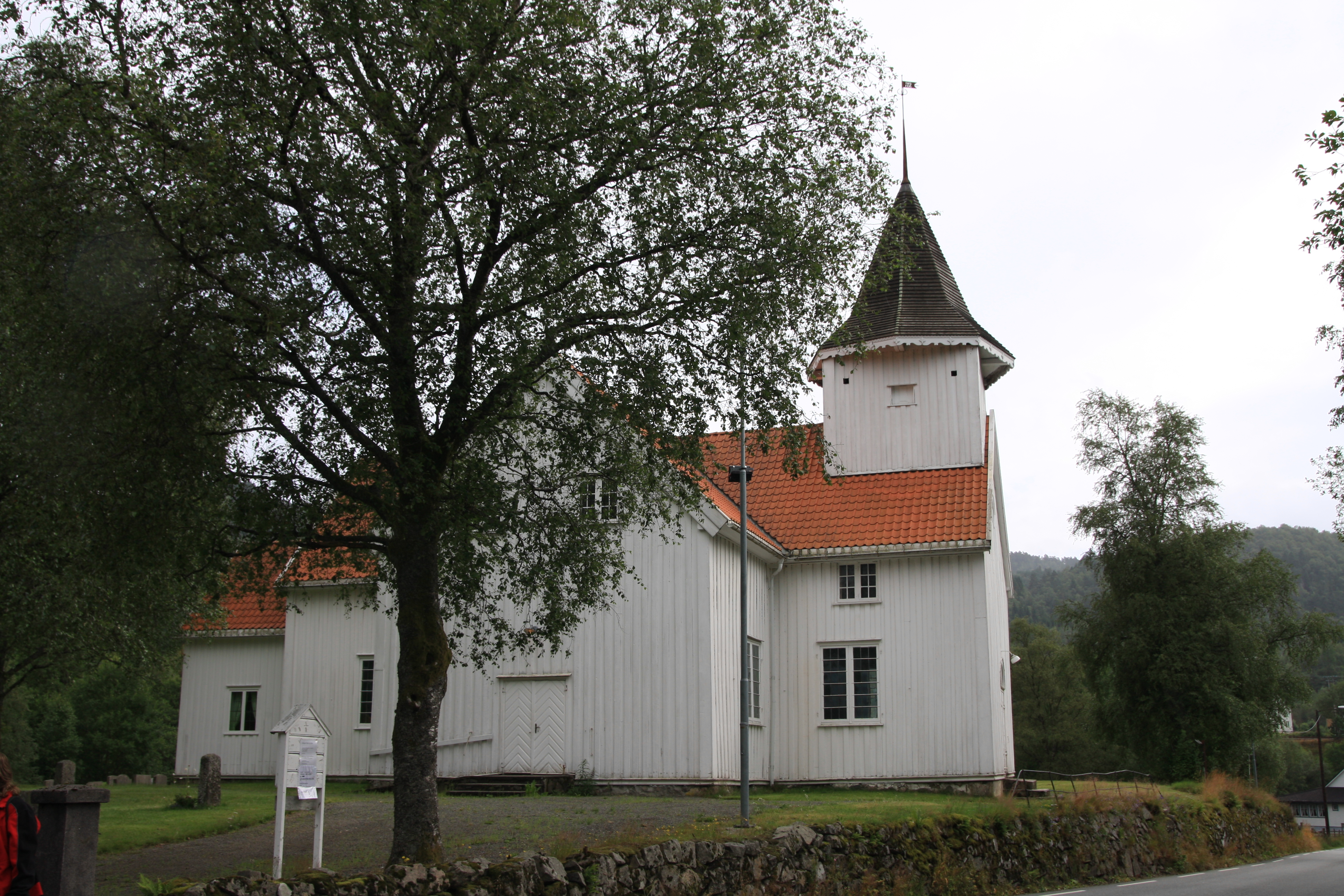
- View of the church
- Bakke Church
- 58.413899°N 06.658778°E
- Location: Flekkefjord Municipality, Agder
- Country: Norway
- Denomination: Church of Norway
- Churchmanship: Evangelical Lutheran

History
- Status: Parish church
- Founded: Middle Ages

Architecture
- Functional status: Active
- Architectural type: Cruciform
- Completed: 1670; 356 years ago

Specifications
- Capacity: 400
- Materials: Wood

Administration
- Diocese: Agder og Telemark
- Deanery: Lister og Mandal prosti
- Parish: Bakke
- Norwegian Cultural Heritage Site
- Type: Church
- Status: Automatically protected
- ID: 83841

Bakke Church (Norwegian: Bakke kirke) is a parish church of the Church of Norway in the large Flekkefjord Municipality in Agder county, Norway. It is located in the village of Sira. It is the church for the Bakke parish which is part of the Lister og Mandal prosti (deanery) in the Diocese of Agder og Telemark. The white, wooden church was built in a cruciform design in 1670 using plans drawn up by an unknown architect. The church seats about 400 people.

== History ==
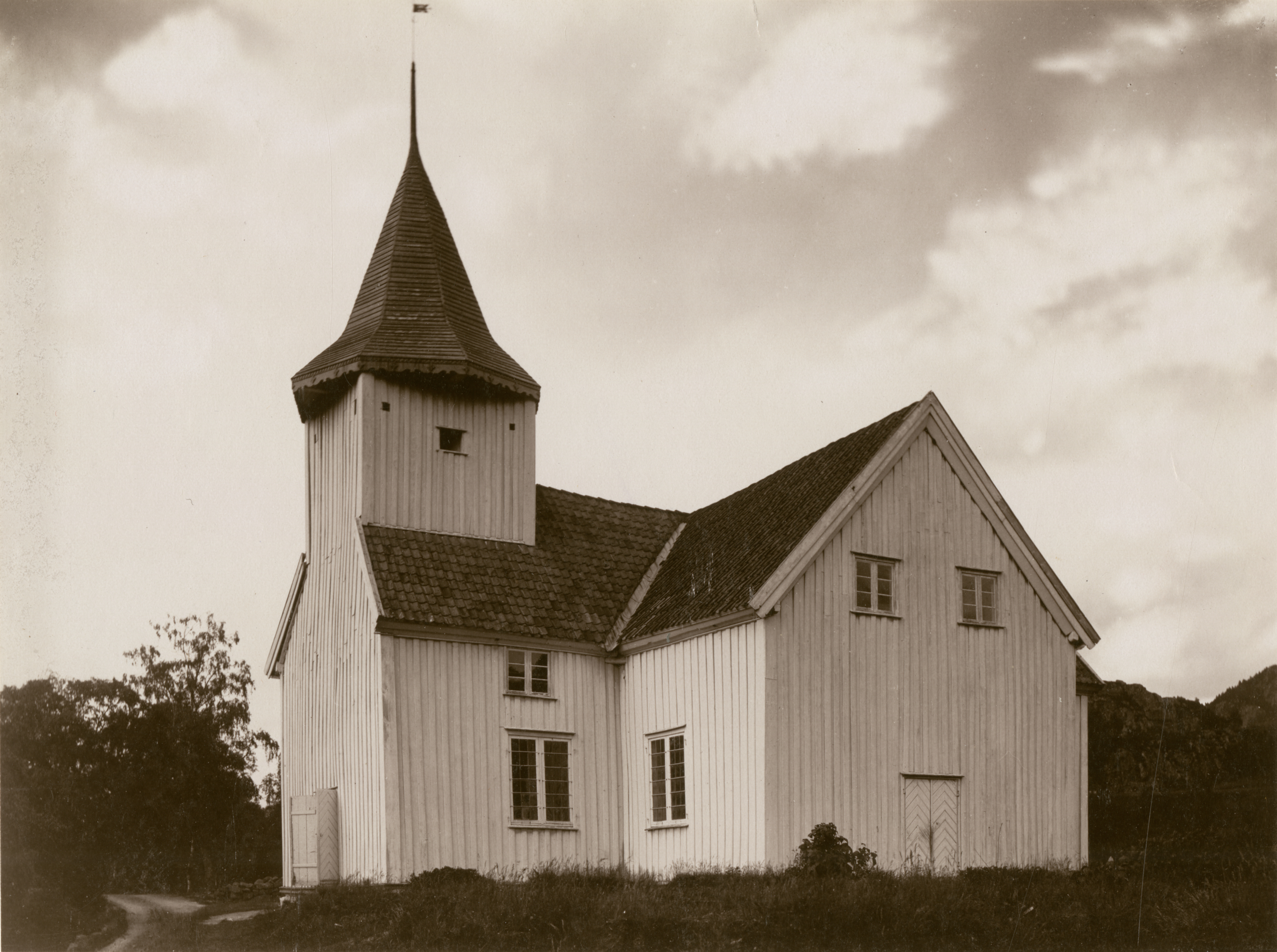
View of the church around the year 1900.

Early records show that there was a stave church located at Bakke during the Middle Ages, but not much is known of that church. In 1668, the choir of the old church was torn down and replaced with a new timber-framed structure. Shortly afterwards, the nave of the old church was torn down and replaced with a new timber-framed structure. After these two renovations, the entire building was essentially brand new. In 1757, the church was significantly renovated and enlarged. In 1806–1807, the church was again renovated by removing the roof, raising the heights of the walls and rebuilding the roof.

In 1814, this church served as an election church (Norwegian: valgkirke). Together with more than 300 other parish churches across Norway, it was a polling station for elections to the 1814 Norwegian Constituent Assembly which wrote the Constitution of Norway. This was Norway's first national elections. Each church parish was a constituency that elected people called "electors" who later met together in each county to elect the representatives for the assembly that was to meet at Eidsvoll Manor later that year.

== See also ==
- List of churches in Agder og Telemark
