= Johan Andreas Kraft =

Norwegian politician

Johan Andreas Kraft (25 March 1808 – 1896) was a Norwegian physician and politician.

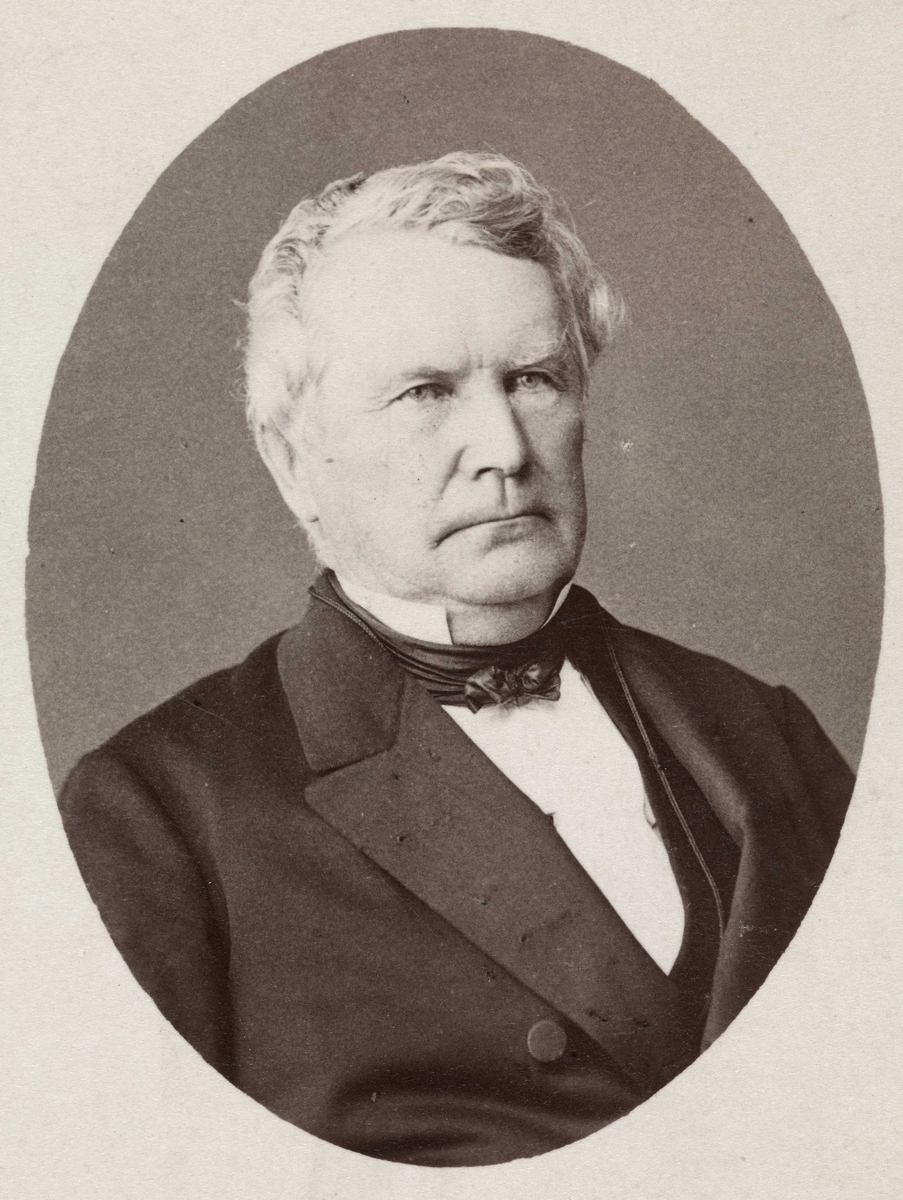
Johan Andreas Kraft

He served as a deputy representative to the Parliament of Norway in the term 1862–1864, representing the urban constituency of Flekkefjord. He sat through only one term. He was mayor of Flekkefjord Municipality in 1842, 1858 and 1859.

He worked as a physician in Flekkefjord from 1834, and remained there for fifty years. He was a founder of the Norwegian Medical Society, and an honorary member from 1883.

Together with Fredrikke Christiane Weltzin (1819–1882) he had the daughter Christiane Marie Kraft, born 1840, who was married to engineer Carl Dahl until her death in 1864. Kraft died in 1896.
