= Nes Municipality (Vest-Agder) =

Former municipality in Vest-Agder, Norway

Nes Municipality Nes herred
- Former municipality
- Vest-Agder within Norway

- Nes within Vest-Agder
- Coordinates: 58°17′49″N 06°39′38″E
- Country: Norway
- County: Vest-Agder
- District: Lister
- Established: 8 Oct 1893
  - Preceded by: Nes og Hitterø Municipality
- Disestablished: 1 Jan 1965
  - Succeeded by: Flekkefjord Municipality
- Administrative centre: Nes

Government
  - Mayor (1964–1964): Trygve Hanssen

Area (upon dissolution)
  - Total: 148.2 km^{2} (57.2 sq mi)
  - Rank: #370 in Norway
- Highest elevation: 453 m (1,486 ft)

Population (1964)
  - Total: 2,759
  - Rank: #321 in Norway
  - Density: 18.6/km^{2} (48/sq mi)
  - Change (10 years): ▲ +11.8%
- Demonym: Nessokning

Official language
  - Norwegian form: Neutral
- Time zone: UTC+01:00 (CET)
  - Summer (DST): UTC+02:00 (CEST)
- ISO 3166 code: NO-1043

Nes is a former municipality in the old Vest-Agder county, Norway. The 148.2-square-kilometre (57.2 sq mi) municipality existed from 1893 until its dissolution in 1965. The area is now part of Flekkefjord Municipality in the traditional district of Lister in Agder county. The administrative centre of the municipality was the small village of Sunde in Nes parish, located just outside the town of Flekkefjord (which was its own separate municipality).

Prior to its dissolution in 1965, the 148.2-square-kilometre (57.2 sq mi) municipality was the 370th largest by area out of the 525 municipalities in Norway. Nes Municipality was the 321st most populous municipality in Norway with a population of about 2,759. The municipality's population density was 18.6 inhabitants per square kilometre (48/sq mi) and its population had increased by 11.8% over the previous 10-year period.

== General information ==
The municipality of Nes was established on 8 October 1893 when the old Nes og Hitterø Municipality was split into two: the northern district (population: 1,704) became the new Nes Municipality and the southern district (population: 2,075) became the new Hitterø Municipality. In 1942, a part of Nes Municipality with 377 inhabitants was moved to the neighboring town of Flekkefjord.

During the 1960s, there were many municipal mergers across Norway due to the work of the Schei Committee. On 1 January 1965, Nes Municipality was dissolved and the following areas were merged to form a new, larger Flekkefjord Municipality:

- the town of Flekkefjord (population: 3,163)
- all of Nes Municipality (population: 2,757)
- all of Hidra Municipality (population: 1,277)
- all of Gyland Municipality (population: 691)
- most of Bakke Municipality (population: 925), except for the Øksendal area which went to Sirdal Municipality

=== Name ===
The municipality (originally the parish) is named after the old Nes farm (Old Norse: Nes) since the first local church (now called Flekkefjord Church) was built there. The name is identical to the word nes which means "peninsula", since the farm is located on a peninsula.

=== Churches ===
The Church of Norway had one parish (sokn) within Nes Municipality. At the time of the municipal dissolution, it was part of the Flekkefjord prestegjeld and the Flekkefjord prosti (deanery) in the Diocese of Agder.

Churches in Nes Municipality
Parish (sokn)	Church name	Location of the church	Year built
Nes	Flekkefjord Church	Flekkefjord	1833

== Geography ==
The highest point in the municipality was the 453-metre (1,486 ft) tall mountain Solandsvarden. Bakke Municipality was located to the north, Gyland Municipality was located to the northeast, Feda Municipality was located to the east, Herad Municipality was located to the southeast, Flekkefjord Municipality was located to the south (as an enclave), Hidra Municipality was located to the southwest, and Lund Municipality was located to the west (in Rogaland county).

== Government ==
While it existed, Nes Municipality was responsible for primary education (through 10th grade), outpatient health services, senior citizen services, welfare and other social services, zoning, economic development, and municipal roads and utilities. The municipality was governed by a municipal council of directly elected representatives. The mayor was indirectly elected by a vote of the municipal council. The municipality was under the jurisdiction of the Flekkefjord District Court and the Agder Court of Appeal.

=== Municipal council ===
The municipal council (Herredsstyre) of Nes Municipality was made up of 17 representatives that were elected to four year terms. The tables below show the historical composition of the council by political party.

Nes herredsstyre 1963–1964
Party name (in Norwegian)	Number of representatives
Labour Party (Arbeiderpartiet)	7
Conservative Party (Høyre)	2
Christian Democratic Party (Kristelig Folkeparti)	3
Centre Party (Senterpartiet)	1
Liberal Party (Venstre)	4
Total number of members:	17
Note: On 1 January 1965, Nes Municipality became part of Flekkefjord Municipality.

Nes herredsstyre 1959–1963
Party name (in Norwegian)	Number of representatives
Labour Party (Arbeiderpartiet)	5
Conservative Party (Høyre)	2
Christian Democratic Party (Kristelig Folkeparti)	4
Centre Party (Senterpartiet)	1
Liberal Party (Venstre)	5
Total number of members:	17

Nes herredsstyre 1955–1959
Party name (in Norwegian)	Number of representatives
Labour Party (Arbeiderpartiet)	5
Conservative Party (Høyre)	2
Christian Democratic Party (Kristelig Folkeparti)	3
Farmers' Party (Bondepartiet)	2
Liberal Party (Venstre)	5
Total number of members:	17

Nes herredsstyre 1951–1955
Party name (in Norwegian)	Number of representatives
Labour Party (Arbeiderpartiet)	6
Conservative Party (Høyre)	2
Christian Democratic Party (Kristelig Folkeparti)	3
Liberal Party (Venstre)	4
Local List(s) (Lokale lister)	1
Total number of members:	16

Nes herredsstyre 1947–1951
Party name (in Norwegian)	Number of representatives
Labour Party (Arbeiderpartiet)	5
Christian Democratic Party (Kristelig Folkeparti)	4
Joint list of the Liberal Party (Venstre) and the Radical People's Party (Radikale Folkepartiet)	4
List of workers, fishermen, and small farmholders (Arbeidere, fiskere, småbrukere liste)	3
Total number of members:	16

Nes herredsstyre 1945–1947
Party name (in Norwegian)	Number of representatives
Labour Party (Arbeiderpartiet)	5
Conservative Party (Høyre)	1
Christian Democratic Party (Kristelig Folkeparti)	4
Joint list of the Liberal Party (Venstre) and the Radical People's Party (Radikale Folkepartiet)	5
List of workers, fishermen, and small farmholders (Arbeidere, fiskere, småbrukere liste)	1
Total number of members:	16

Nes herredsstyre 1937–1941*
Party name (in Norwegian)	Number of representatives
Labour Party (Arbeiderpartiet)	4
Conservative Party (Høyre)	2
Farmers' Party (Bondepartiet)	4
Liberal Party (Venstre)	6
Total number of members:	16
Note: Due to the German occupation of Norway during World War II, no elections were held for new municipal councils until after the war ended in 1945.

=== Mayors ===
The mayor (Norwegian: ordfører) of Nes Municipality was the political leader of the municipality and the chairperson of the municipal council. The following people have held this position:

- 1893–1904: Johannes Jensen Loge
- 1904–1919: Andreas S. Tjersland
- 1919–1921: Nils Djuvik
- 1922–1929: Andreas S. Tjersland
- 1929–1933: Theodor Tønnessen Lende
- 1933–1937: Hans Olsen Aarenes
- 1938–1940: Ola Eide
- 1941–1945: Gisle Tjersland
- 1945–1951: Ola Eide
- 1952–1955: Gudmund Seland
- 1956–1959: Ole Soland
- 1960–1963: Ola Eide
- 1964–1964: Trygve Hanssen

== See also ==
- List of former municipalities of Norway
