= Flekkefjord (town) =

Town in Agder, Norway

- Town/City
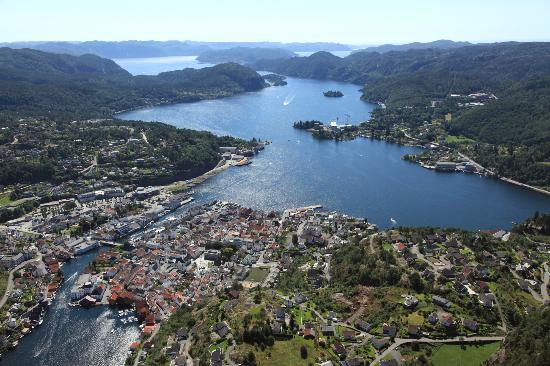
- View of the town
- Interactive map of Flekkefjord
- Coordinates: 58.29714°N 6.66027°E
- Country: Norway
- Region: Southern Norway
- County: Agder
- District: Lister
- Municipality: Flekkefjord Municipality
- Established as
- Ladested: 1660
- Kjøpstad: 1842

Area
  - Total: 3.6 km^{2} (1.4 sq mi)
- Elevation: 4 m (13 ft)

Population (2025)
  - Total: 6,262
  - Density: 1,739/km^{2} (4,500/sq mi)
- Time zone: UTC+01:00 (CET)
  - Summer (DST): UTC+02:00 (CEST)
- Post Code: 4400 Flekkefjord

Flekkefjord is a town in Flekkefjord Municipality in Agder county, Norway. The town is located at the end of the Flekkefjorden, a branch off the main Listafjorden. The town is the administrative centre of Flekkefjord Municipality, the southwestern-most municipality in the county. Flekkefjord Church and Sørlandet Hospital Flekkefjord are both located in the town. In Norway, Flekkefjord is considered a by which can be translated as either a "town" or "city" in English.

The 3.6-square-kilometre (890-acre) town has a population (2025) of 6,262 and a population density of 1,739 inhabitants per square kilometre (4,500/sq mi).

The town is a major population center in southwestern Agder county. The European route E39 highway runs through the town. It is the main highway running along the southern coast of Norway. The Sørlandet Line stops about 15 kilometres (9.3 mi) to the north in the village of Sira. The lake Selura lies on the northeast side of the town.

== History ==
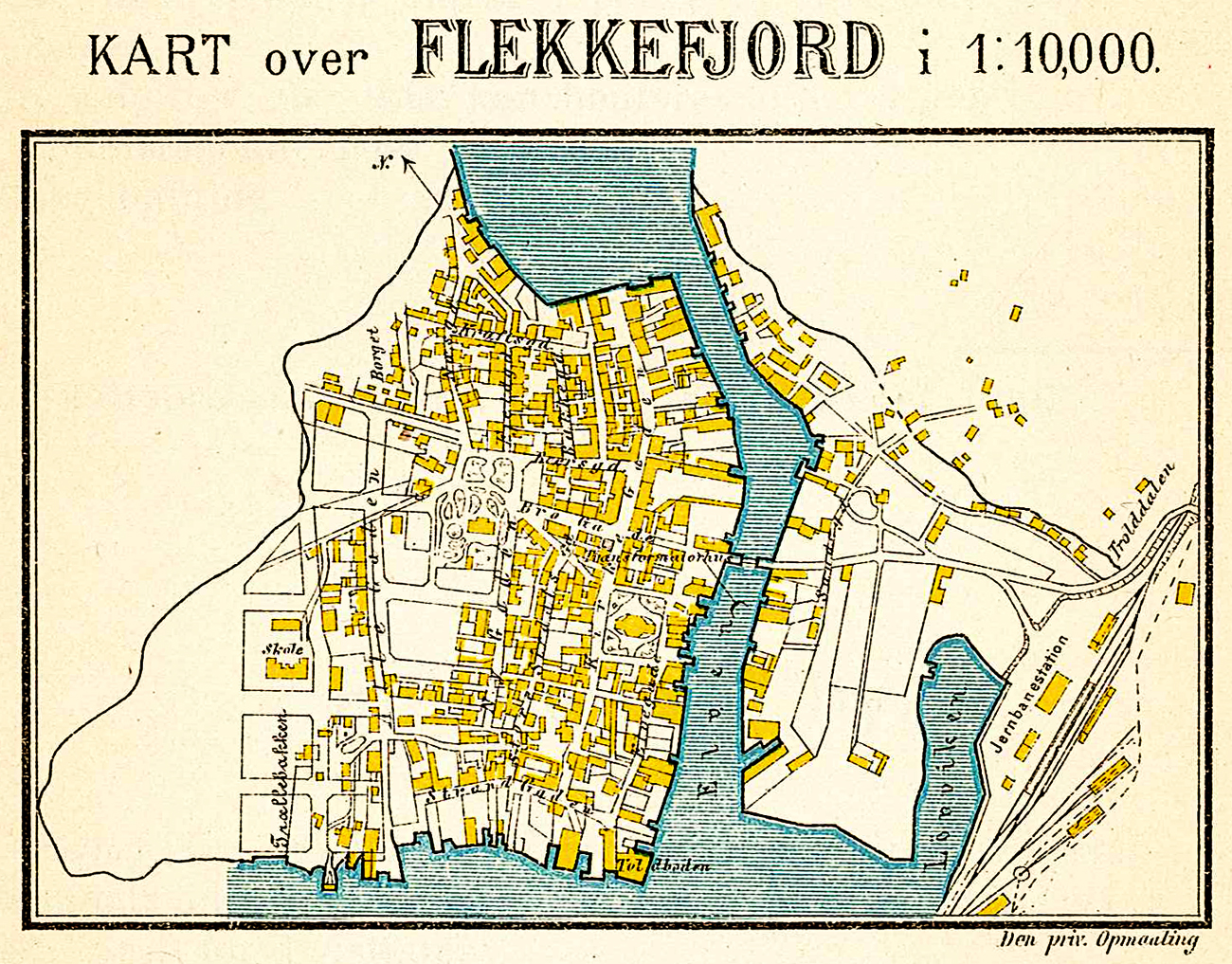
Map of Flekkefjord in 1903

The town of Flekkefjord was a lading place from early times. It was mentioned as a town as early as 1580. In 1589, King James VI of Scotland landed there before traveling overland via Tønsberg to Oslo, where he married Princess Anne of Denmark, daughter of King Frederick II. When the city of Kristiansand was founded in 1641, King Christian IV wanted to assure the economic survival of his new city by moving Flekkefjord residents there. Twice it was sentenced to extinction by royal decree, but many of the Flekkefjord inhabitants remained and continued to trade. In 1660, Flekkefjord was designated as a ladested, giving it special trading rights under the law.

Norway's plentiful stone was a Flekkefjord commodity. In 1736 over 300 Dutch ships are reported to have carried paving stones from Flekkefjord. By 1750, the herring fishery began in earnest, such that herring and timber dominated the trade. In the 1750s, Flekkefjord was the most important Norwegian herring export harbor.

In 1760, Flekkefjord petitioned King Frederik V to grant a town charter. At that time, several ships were home ported there and both sailors and herring fishermen had their homes in this small town that was not officially recognized. Barrel-making (cooperage) was also an important local trade that served the fishing fleet.

During the Napoleonic Wars, Flekkefjord found a new life as a smugglers port, exporting oak to the Napoleon-occupied Netherlands during the period prior to 1807. The unusual tidal condition, the local timber abundance, and a long-term relationship with the Dutch were the reasons behind Flekkefjord's then serving as a smuggler's headquarters. They specialized in the lucrative oak trade, the warship timber in those days. Ships could come and leave Flekkefjord at any hour of the day, without concern for the tides.

Prior to 1807, the Kingdom of Denmark-Norway had followed a policy of armed neutrality, using its naval forces only to protect trade flowing within, into, and out of Danish and Norwegian waters. But this changed for the last phase of the Napoleonic Wars when, in the Battle of Copenhagen in 1807, the British preemptively captured large portions of the Danish naval fleet to prevent the French from doing the same. As a result, the Danish government declared war and built small gunboats in large numbers to attack the British. The Gunboat War (1807–1814) was the title given to naval conflict between Denmark-Norway against the British navy. It was natural for Flekkefjord to move from a smuggler's haven to blockade runner's headquarters. The unusual tides there were unknown to the British warships that were blockading the Norwegian coast against Napoleon-supporting ships and this provided the blockade runners a considerable advantage.

After the war, the Dutch maintained a strong presence in Flekkefjord, and continued exporting oak and pine. The pine was used mainly to make foundations for the boom in Amsterdam house construction; as a result most of Amsterdam's houses from the 19th century are constructed of pines from Flekkefjord exporters. A section of Flekkefjord called 'Hollenderbyen' (town of the Dutch) dates from the 18th century.

On 1 January 1838, the town of Flekkefjord was established as its own municipality under the new Formannskapsdistrikt law which granted limited, local self-governance in every rural parish and every town in Norway, and as a ladested it became self-governing. In 1842, the small town was designated as a kjøpstad, giving it full town rights under the law. The town was expanded in 1942 when a small area of the neighboring Nes Municipality (population: 377) was transferred into the town.

During the 1960s, there were many municipal mergers across Norway due to the work of the Schei Committee. On 1 January 1965, the town of Flekkefjord was merged with the neighboring municipalities of Hidra, Gyland, and Nes plus most of Bakke Municipality to form the new (much larger) Flekkefjord Municipality with nearly 9,000 residents.

=== Name ===
The town is named after the local fjord called the Flekkefjorden. The fjord is named after the old Flikka farm (Old Norse: Flikkar) that is located near the fjord. The meaning of the name is unknown.

== Politics ==
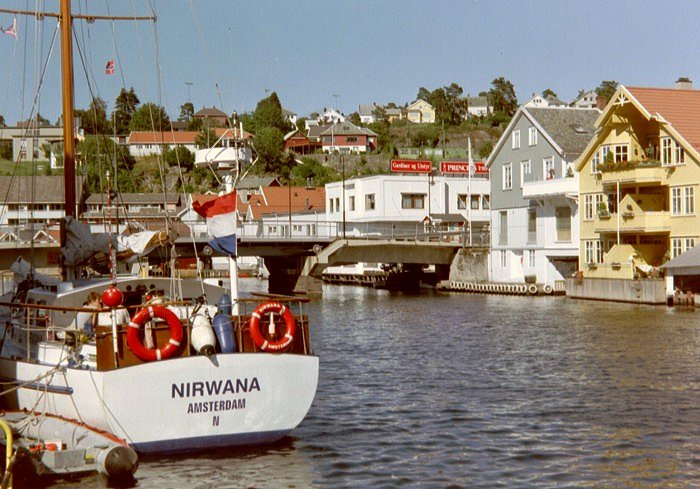
View of the port of Flekkefjord

After Flekkefjord acquired kjøpstad status in 1842, it also became a constituency for elections to the Parliament of Norway. The first representative was elected in 1845: Gerhard Heiberg Garmann. He served for three years before Nils Elias Børresen was elected. He served until 1863, when deputy Johan Andreas Kraft took over for one year. Knud Geelmuyden Fleischer Maartmann served from 1865 to 1866 and 1868 to 1869, and Elias Didrichsen served from 1871 to 1888, interrupted by Thorvald Olsen who served from 1877 through 1879. Niels Eyde, Jakob Stang, Sivert Hanssen-Sunde and Hans Sivert Jacobsen served one three-year term each between 1889 and 1900. Then, Cornelius Bernhard Hanssen served from 1900 to 1921, interrupted by Bernhard Severin Sannerud in the years 1916 through 1918. A law change in 1919 discontinued Flekkefjord as a constituency of its own; from then it was a part of the combined constituency Market towns of Vest-Agder and Rogaland counties.

Mayors in Flekkefjord typically served for one year from the start of local government in 1838. Of the notable early mayors were Jens Henrik Beer (Parliament member before Flekkefjord became its own constituency) in 1840 and Anders Beer in 1843. Many of the parliamentarians served as mayors: J. A. Kraft in 1842, 1858 and 1859; Børresen in 1846, 1849, 1850, 1852 and 1862; Didrichsen from 1853 to 1857, 1863 to 1870, 1878 to 1879 and 1883 to 1888; Jacobsen in 1889; Hanssen-Sunde from 1893 to 1899; Sannerud from 1906 to 1909 and in 1917; and C. B. Hanssen in 1933, 1936 and 1937.

== Media gallery ==
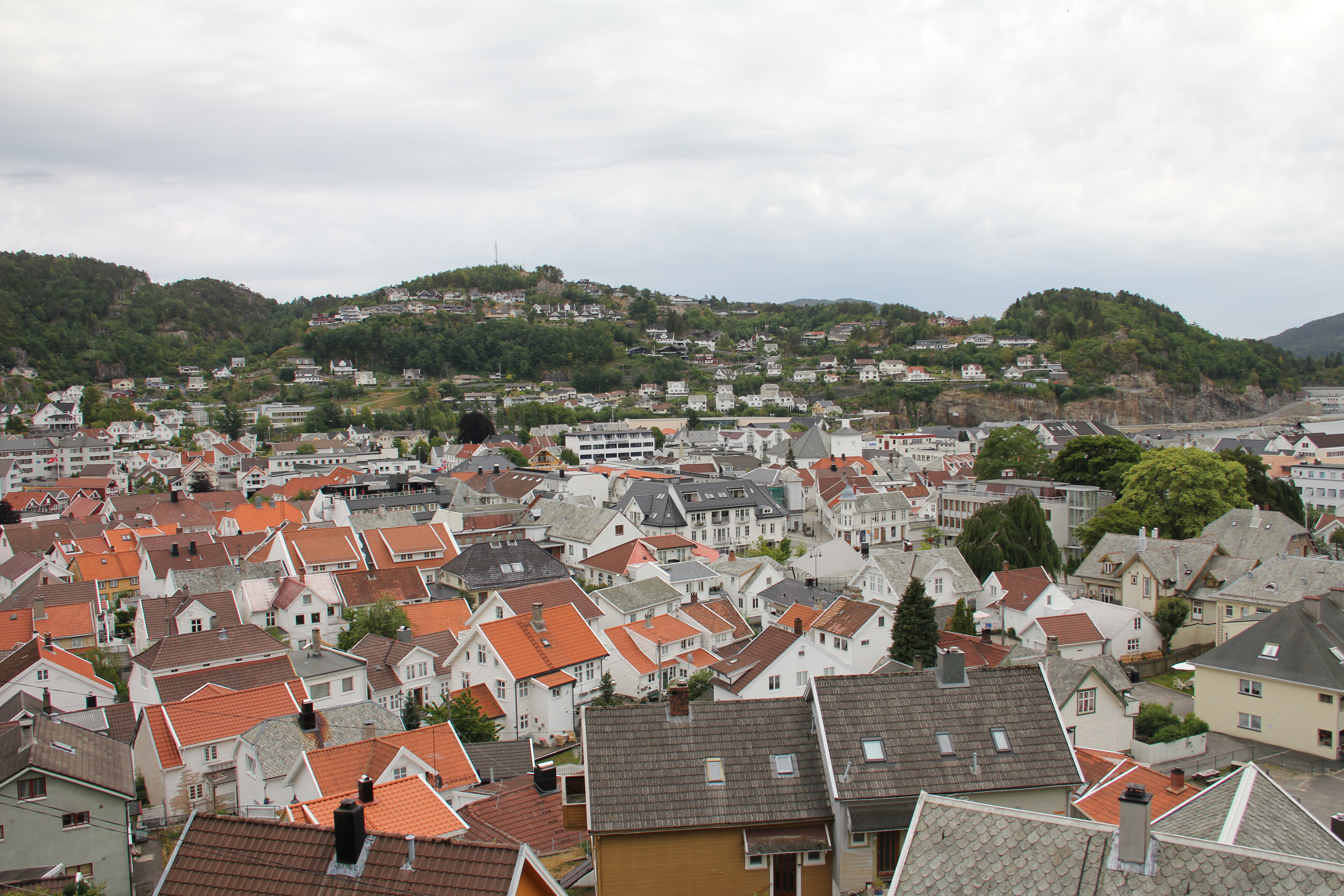
View of the town

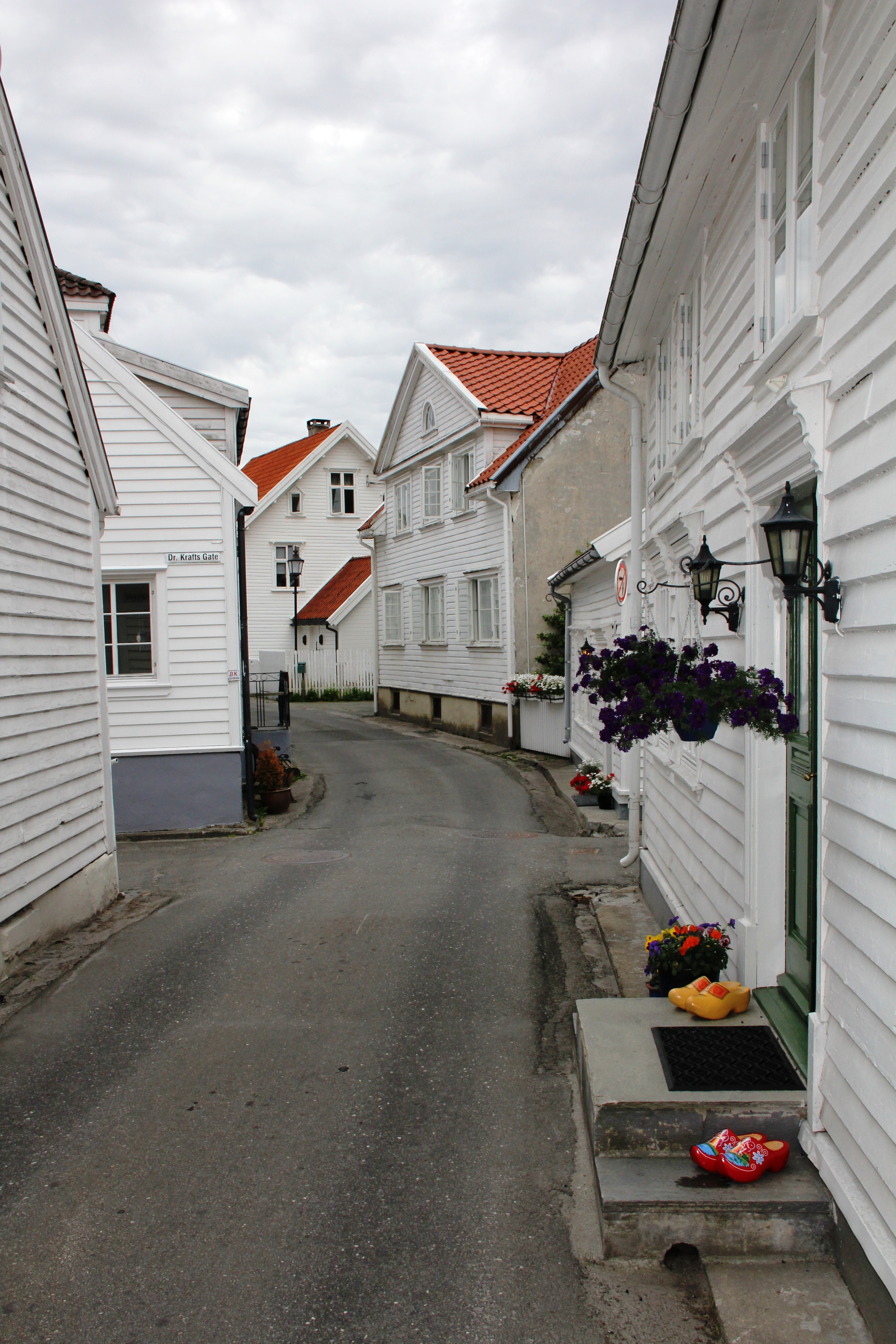
Nesgaten road in Flekkefjord

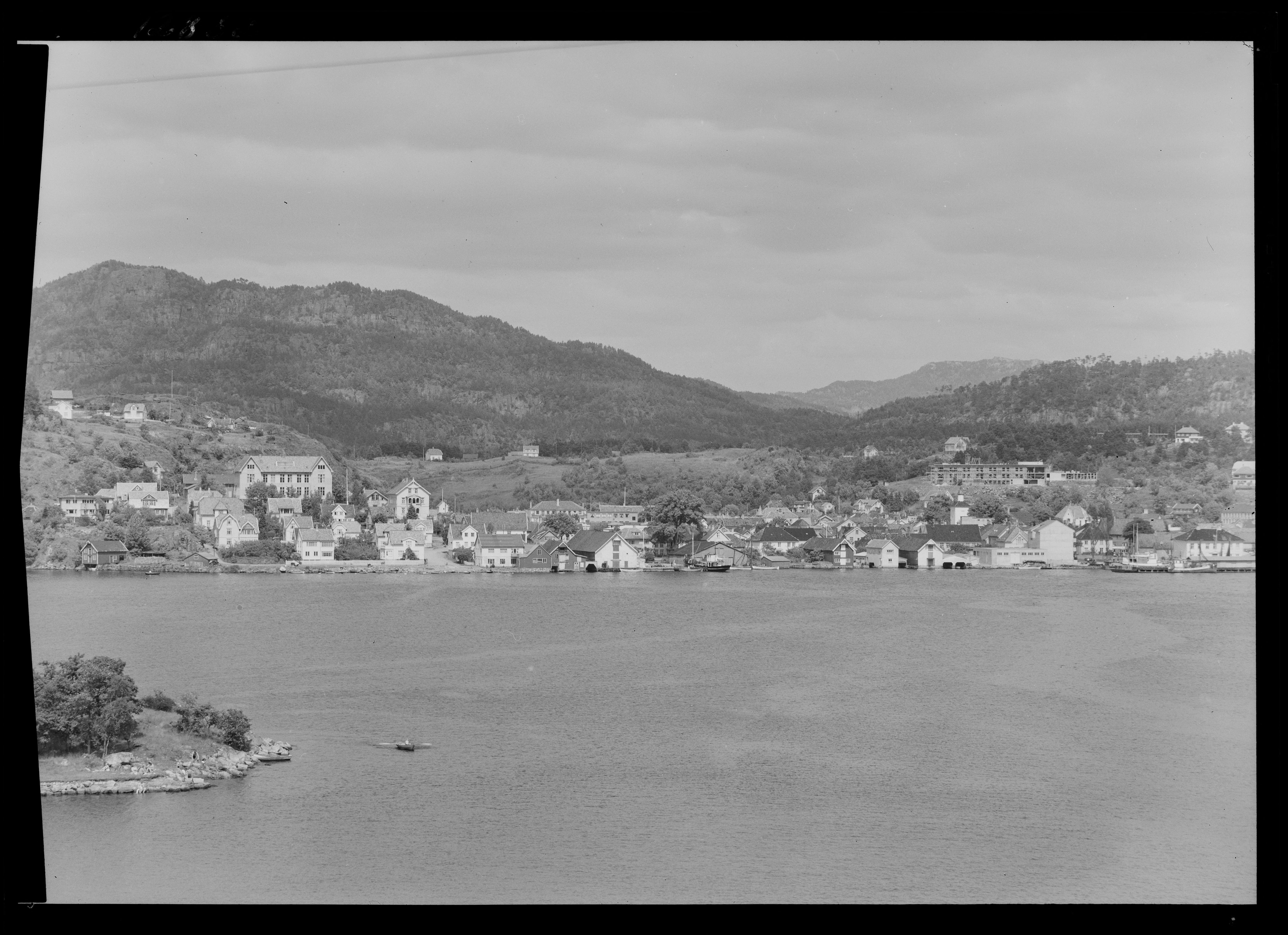
Flekkefjord in 1953

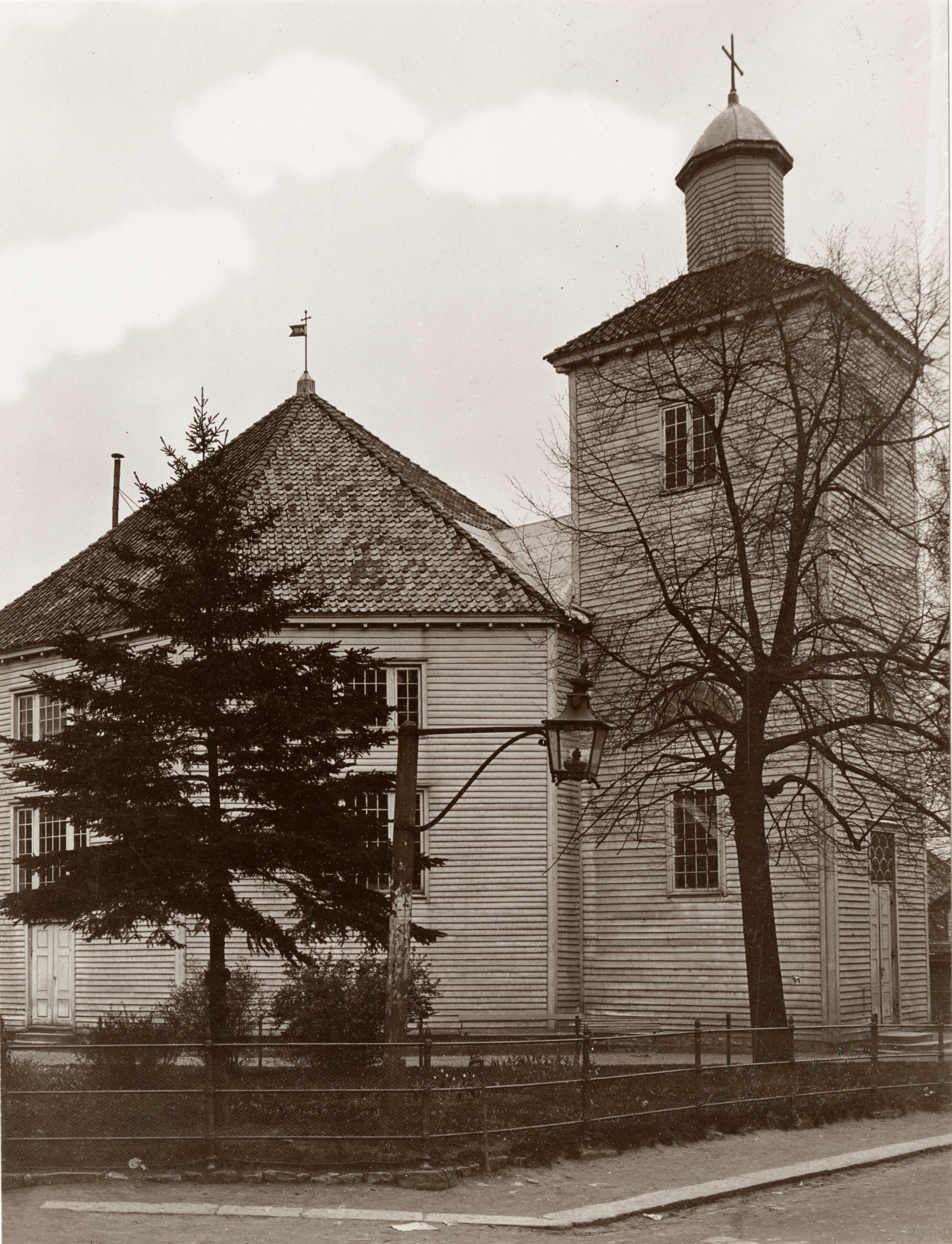
Flekkefjord Church, circa 1905

== See also ==
- List of towns and cities in Norway
