= Øvre Sirdal Municipality =

Former municipality in Vest-Agder, Norway

Øvre Sirdal Municipality Øvre Sirdal herred
- Former municipality
- Øvre Sirdalen herred (historic name)
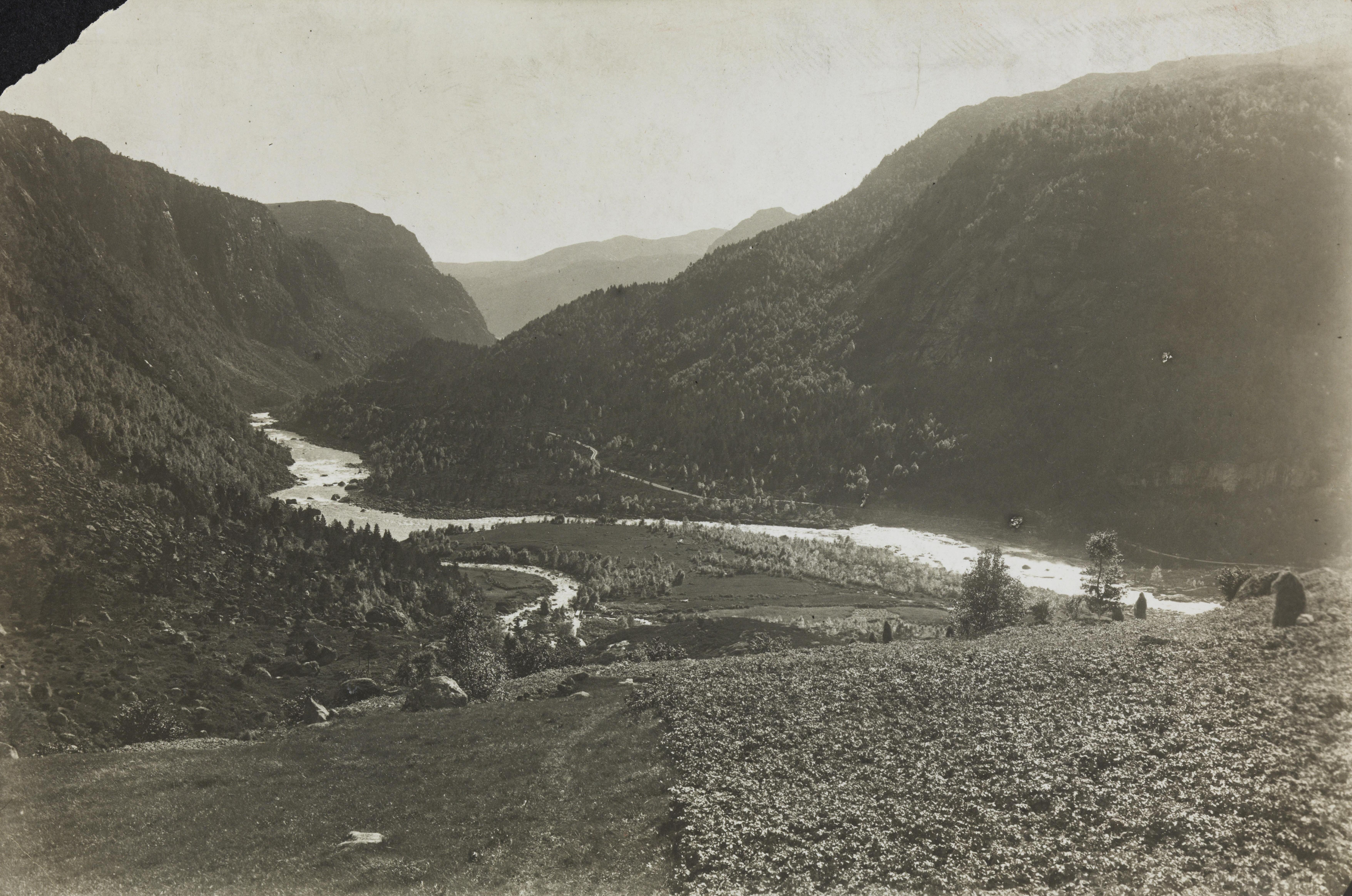

- Vest-Agder within Norway

- Øvre Sirdal within Vest-Agder
- Coordinates: 58°48′30″N 06°45′51″E
- Country: Norway
- County: Vest-Agder
- District: Lister
- Established: 1 Jan 1905
  - Preceded by: Sirdal Municipality
- Disestablished: 1 Jan 1960
  - Succeeded by: Sirdal Municipality
- Administrative centre: Lunde

Area (upon dissolution)
  - Total: 1,051 km^{2} (406 sq mi)
  - Rank: #84 in Norway
- Highest elevation: 1,433.75 m (4,703.9 ft)

Population (1959)
  - Total: 548
  - Rank: #726 in Norway
  - Density: 0.5/km^{2} (1.3/sq mi)
  - Change (10 years): ▼ −7%
- Demonym: Sirdøl

Official language
  - Norwegian form: Nynorsk
- Time zone: UTC+01:00 (CET)
  - Summer (DST): UTC+02:00 (CEST)
- ISO 3166 code: NO-1047

Øvre Sirdal is a former municipality in the old Vest-Agder county, Norway. The 1,051-square-kilometre (406 sq mi) municipality existed from 1905 until its dissolution in 1960. The area is now part of Sirdal Municipality in the traditional district of Lister in Agder county. The administrative centre was the village of Lunde where Lunde Church is located.

Prior to its dissolution in 1960, the 1,051-square-kilometre (406 sq mi) municipality was the 84th largest by area out of the 743 municipalities in Norway. Øvre Sirdal Municipality was the 726th most populous municipality in Norway with a population of about 548. The municipality's population density was 0.5 inhabitants per square kilometre (1.3/sq mi) and its population had decreased by 7% over the previous 10-year period.

== General information ==
The municipality of Øvre Sirdal was established on 1 January 1905 when the old Sirdal Municipality was dissolved and divided into two new municipalities: the northern part (population: 753) became the new Øvre Sirdal Municipality and the southern part (population: 828) became the new Tonstad Municipality.

During the 1960s, there were many municipal mergers across Norway due to the work of the Schei Committee. On 1 January 1960, Øvre Sirdal Municipality was dissolved and the following areas were merged to form a new Sirdal Municipality:

- all of Øvre Sirdal Municipality (population: 549)
- all of Tonstad Municipality (population: 651)
- the Øksendal area of Bakke Municipality (population: 226)

=== Name ===
The municipality (originally the parish) is named after the Sirdalen valley (Old Norse: Sírudalr) since the valley runs through the municipality. The prefix øvre means "upper" (since this was created from the upper part of the old Sirdal Municipality. The first element of the name is the genitive case of the river name Síra (now the Sira river). The river name has an unknown meaning, but it could be something like "strong stream". The last element is dalr which means "valley" or "dale". Historically, the name of the municipality was spelled Øvre Sirdalen. On 3 November 1917, a royal resolution changed the spelling of the name of the municipality to Øvre Sirdal, removing the definite form ending -en.

=== Churches ===
The Church of Norway had one parish (sokn) within Øvre Sirdal Municipality. At the time of the municipal dissolution, it was part of the Sirdal prestegjeld and the Flekkefjord prosti (deanery) in the Diocese of Agder.

Churches in Øvre Sirdal Municipality
Parish (sokn)	Church name	Location of the church	Year built
Øvre Sirdal	Lunde Church	Lunde	1873

== Geography ==
The municipality was located in the northern Sirdalen valley. The river Sira flows through the valley. The highest point in the municipality was the 1,433.75-metre (4,703.9 ft) tall mountain Urdalsknuten, on the northern border with Valle Municipality. Bykle Municipality was located to the north (in Aust-Agder county), Valle Municipality was located to the northeast (also in Aust-Agder), Bygland Municipality was located to the southeast (also in Aust-Agder), Tonstad Municipality was located to the south, Heskestad Municipality was located to the southwest (in Rogaland county), Bjerkreim Municipality was located to the west (also in Rogaland), and Forsand Municipality was located to the northwest (also in Rogaland).

== Government ==
While it existed, Øvre Sirdal Municipality was responsible for primary education (through 10th grade), outpatient health services, senior citizen services, welfare and other social services, zoning, economic development, and municipal roads and utilities. The municipality was governed by a municipal council of directly elected representatives. The mayor was indirectly elected by a vote of the municipal council. The municipality was under the jurisdiction of the Flekkefjord District Court and the Agder Court of Appeal.

=== Municipal council ===
The municipal council (Herredsstyre) of Øvre Sirdal Municipality was made up of 13 representatives that were elected to four year terms. The tables below show the historical composition of the council by political party.

Øvre Sirdal heradsstyre 1955–1959
Party name (in Nynorsk)	Number of representatives
Local List(s) (Lokale lister)	13
Total number of members:	13
Note: On 1 January 1960, Øvre Sirdal Municipality became part of Sirdal Municipality.

Øvre Sirdal heradsstyre 1951–1955
Party name (in Nynorsk)	Number of representatives
Local List(s) (Lokale lister)	12
Total number of members:	12

Øvre Sirdal heradsstyre 1947–1951
Party name (in Nynorsk)	Number of representatives
Local List(s) (Lokale lister)	12
Total number of members:	12

Øvre Sirdal heradsstyre 1945–1947
Party name (in Nynorsk)	Number of representatives
Local List(s) (Lokale lister)	12
Total number of members:	12

Øvre Sirdal heradsstyre 1937–1941*
Party name (in Nynorsk)	Number of representatives
Local List(s) (Lokale lister)	12
Total number of members:	12
Note: Due to the German occupation of Norway during World War II, no elections were held for new municipal councils until after the war ended in 1945.

=== Mayors ===
The mayor (Nynorsk: ordførar) of Øvre Sirdal Municipality was the political leader of the municipality and the chairperson of the municipal council. The following people have held this position:

- 1905–1914: Per Iversen Ousdal
- 1914–1918: K. Myklebust
- 1918–1919: Mr. Valevatn
- 1920–1927: Per O. Ousdal
- 1928–1938: Torkell Neset

== See also ==
- List of former municipalities of Norway
