= Tonstad Municipality =

Former municipality in Vest-Agder, Norway

Tonstad Municipality Tonstad herad
- Former municipality
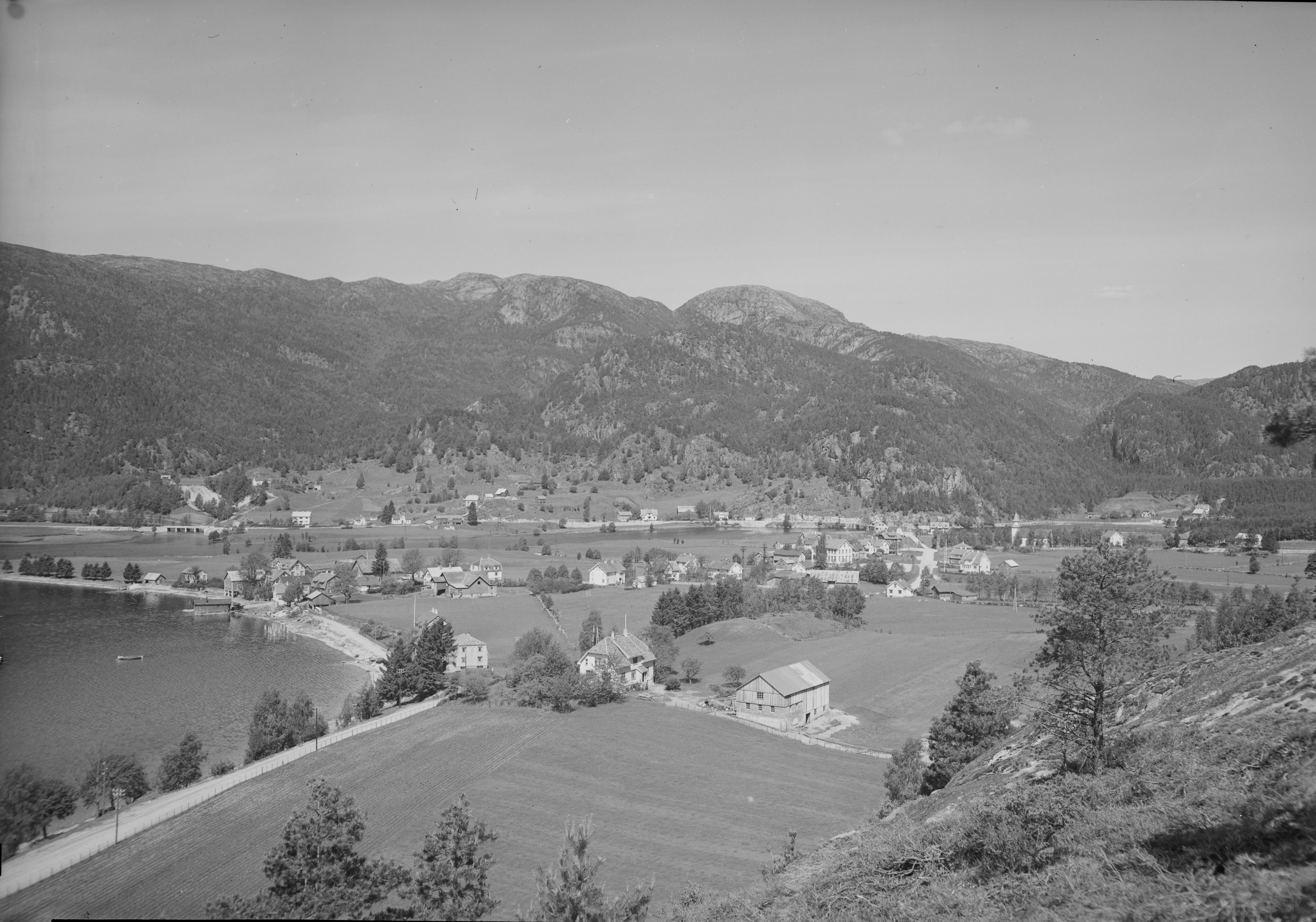
- View of Tonstad in 1948

- Vest-Agder within Norway

- Tonstad within Vest-Agder
- Coordinates: 58°39′51″N 06°42′59″E
- Country: Norway
- County: Vest-Agder
- District: Lister
- Established: 1 Jan 1905
  - Preceded by: Sirdal Municipality
- Disestablished: 1 Jan 1960
  - Succeeded by: Sirdal Municipality
- Administrative centre: Tonstad

Area (upon dissolution)
  - Total: 359 km^{2} (139 sq mi)
  - Rank: #249 in Norway

Population (1959)
  - Total: 650
  - Rank: #712 in Norway
  - Density: 1.8/km^{2} (4.7/sq mi)
  - Change (10 years): ▼ −6%

Official language
  - Norwegian form: Nynorsk
- Time zone: UTC+01:00 (CET)
  - Summer (DST): UTC+02:00 (CEST)
- ISO 3166 code: NO-1046

Tonstad is a former municipality in the old Vest-Agder county, Norway. The 359-square-kilometre (139 sq mi) municipality existed from 1905 until its dissolution in 1960. The area is now part of Sirdal Municipality in the traditional district of Lister in Agder county. The administrative centre was the village of Tonstad where Tonstad Church is located.

Prior to its dissolution in 1960, the 359-square-kilometre (139 sq mi) municipality was the 249th largest by area out of the 743 municipalities in Norway. Tonstad Municipality was the th most populous municipality in Norway with a population of about 650. The municipality's population density was 1.8 inhabitants per square kilometre (4.7/sq mi) and its population had decreased by 6% over the previous 10-year period.

== General information ==
The municipality of Tonstad was established on 1 January 1905 when the old Sirdal Municipality was dissolved and divided into two new municipalities: the northern part (population: 753) became the new Øvre Sirdal Municipality and the southern part (population: 828) became the new Tonstad Municipality.

During the 1960s, there were many municipal mergers across Norway due to the work of the Schei Committee. On 1 January 1960, Tonstad Municipality was dissolved and the following areas were merged to form a new Sirdal Municipality:

- all of Tonstad Municipality (population: 651)
- all of Øvre Sirdal Municipality (population: 549)
- the Øksendal area of Bakke Municipality (population: 226)

=== Name ===
The municipality (originally the parish) is named after the old Tonstad farm (Old Norse: Þornýjarstaðir) since the first Tonstad Church was built there. The first element is the genitive case of the old female name Þorný (a precursor to the more modern name Tone). The last element is the plural form of the word staðr which means "place" or "abode".

=== Churches ===
The Church of Norway had one parish (sokn) within Tonstad Municipality. At the time of the municipal dissolution, it was part of the Sirdal prestegjeld and the Flekkefjord prosti (deanery) in the Diocese of Agder.

Churches in Tonstad Municipality
Parish (sokn)	Church name	Location of the church	Year built
Tonstad	Tonstad Church	Tonstad	1859

== Geography ==
The municipality was located in the central Sirdalen valley, at the northern end of the large lake Sirdalsvatnet. The highest point in the municipality was the 971-metre (3,186 ft) tall mountain Bergehei, along the northern border with Øvre Sirdal Municipality. Øvre Sirdal Municipality was located to the north, Bygland Municipality was located to the northeast (in Aust-Agder county), Fjotland Municipality was located to the east, Bakke Municipality was located to the south, Lund Municipality was located to the southwest, Heskestad Municipality was located to the west (in Rogaland county), and Bjerkreim Municipality was located to the northwest (also in Rogaland county).

== Government ==
While it existed, Tonstad Municipality was responsible for primary education (through 10th grade), outpatient health services, senior citizen services, welfare and other social services, zoning, economic development, and municipal roads and utilities. The municipality was governed by a municipal council of directly elected representatives. The mayor was indirectly elected by a vote of the municipal council. The municipality was under the jurisdiction of the Flekkefjord District Court and the Agder Court of Appeal.

=== Municipal council ===
The municipal council (Herredsstyre) of Tonstad Municipality was made up of 13 representatives that were elected to four year terms. The tables below show the historical composition of the council by political party.

Tonstad heradsstyre 1955–1959
Party name (in Nynorsk)	Number of representatives
Labour Party (Arbeidarpartiet)	3
Joint List(s) of Non-Socialist Parties (Borgarlege Felleslister)	10
Total number of members:	13
Note: On 1 January 1960, Tonstad Municipality became part of Sirdal Municipality.

Tonstad heradsstyre 1951–1955
Party name (in Nynorsk)	Number of representatives
Local List(s) (Lokale lister)	12
Total number of members:	12

Tonstad heradsstyre 1947–1951
Party name (in Nynorsk)	Number of representatives
Labour Party (Arbeidarpartiet)	3
Joint List(s) of Non-Socialist Parties (Borgarlege Felleslister)	4
Local List(s) (Lokale lister)	5
Total number of members:	12

Tonstad heradsstyre 1945–1947
Party name (in Nynorsk)	Number of representatives
Labour Party (Arbeidarpartiet)	3
Local List(s) (Lokale lister)	9
Total number of members:	12

Tonstad heradsstyre 1937–1941*
Party name (in Nynorsk)	Number of representatives
Local List(s) (Lokale lister)	12
Total number of members:	12
Note: Due to the German occupation of Norway during World War II, no elections were held for new municipal councils until after the war ended in 1945.

=== Mayors ===
The mayor (Nynorsk: ordførar) of Tonstad Municipality was the political leader of the municipality and the chairperson of the municipal council. The following people have held this position:

- 1905–1913: Carl Ommundsen Fintland
- 1914–1919: Carl Asbjørnsen Liland
- 1920–1928: Karl Sigbjørnsen Tonstad
- 1929–1938: Kolbein Asbjørnsen Finsnes

== See also ==
- List of former municipalities of Norway
