= Sirdal =

Sirdal may refer to:

- Sirdal Municipality, a municipality in Agder county, Norway
- Sirdalen, a valley in Agder county, Norway
- Sirdal Magmatic Belt, a geologic terrane in Agder county, Norway
- Lake Sirdal, or Sirdalsvatnet, a lake in Agder county, Norway
