= Kulivatnet =

Lake in Agder, Norway

Kulivatn
- Kulivatnet
- Interactive map of Kulivatn
- Location: Sirdal Municipality, Rogaland
- Coordinates: 58.73222°N 6.61889°E
- Basin countries: Norway
- Max. length: 3 kilometres (1.9 mi)
- Max. width: 1.4 kilometres (0.87 mi)
- Surface area: 2.16 km^{2} (0.83 sq mi)
- Shore length^{1}: 14.5 kilometres (9.0 mi)
- Surface elevation: 612 metres (2,008 ft)
- References: NVE
- ^{1} Shore length is not a well-defined measure.

Kulivatn or Kulivatnet is a lake in Sirdal Municipality in Agder county, Norway. It sits just 400 metres (1,300 ft) downhill from the border with Bjerkreim Municipality in Rogaland county. The 2.16-square-kilometre (0.83 sq mi) lake is somewhat V-shaped and it has a small dam on the southeastern side to hold water for hydroelectric power generation. The water flows south through a series of dammed lakes before emptying into the river Sira at Tonstad, about 8 kilometres (5.0 mi) away.

== See also ==
- List of lakes in Norway
