= Bjørnestad =

Village in Sirdal Municipality, Norway

- Village
- Interactive map of Bjørnestad
- Coordinates: 58.65076°N 6.56348°E
- Country: Norway
- Region: Southern Norway
- County: Agder
- District: Lister
- Municipality: Sirdal Municipality
- Elevation: 360 m (1,180 ft)
- Time zone: UTC+01:00 (CET)
  - Summer (DST): UTC+02:00 (CEST)
- Post Code: 4440 Tonstad

Bjørnestad is a village in Sirdal Municipality in Agder county, Norway. The village is located about 10 kilometres (6.2 mi) west of the village of Tonstad, just west of the lake Bjørnestadvatnet. The village is known for the Bjørnestad Skisenter skiing resort.

== Bjørnestad Skisenter ==
The village is known for its small ski resort. The resort has one T-bar lift that pulls skiers 800 metres (2,600 ft) up a mountain. Although very small, it has got some great skiing terrain for more experienced skiers. The slope is about 37% steep on average, which makes it the steepest ski resort in Sirdal. Bjørnestad Skisenter uses this fact in their slogan: brattest i Sirdal (English: Steepest in Sirdal).
