= Ålsheia =

Ski resort in Sirdal, Norway

Ålsheia Ski Centre
- Interactive map of Ålsheia Ski Centre
- Location: Sirdal Municipality, Norway
- Nearest city: Tonstad
- Coordinates: 58.9158°N 6.8665°E
- Website: http://www.aalsheia.no

Ålsheia is the biggest ski resort at Sirdal Municipality in Agder county, Norway. It is located about 40 kilometres (25 mi) from the village of Tonstad.

== Facilities ==
It has skiing for all abilities from pro to amateur. It has two T-bar lifts, four button lifts, and one belt lift. They have two parks including one halfpipe.
