= Gravatn =

Lake in Sirdal, Norway

- Gravatnet
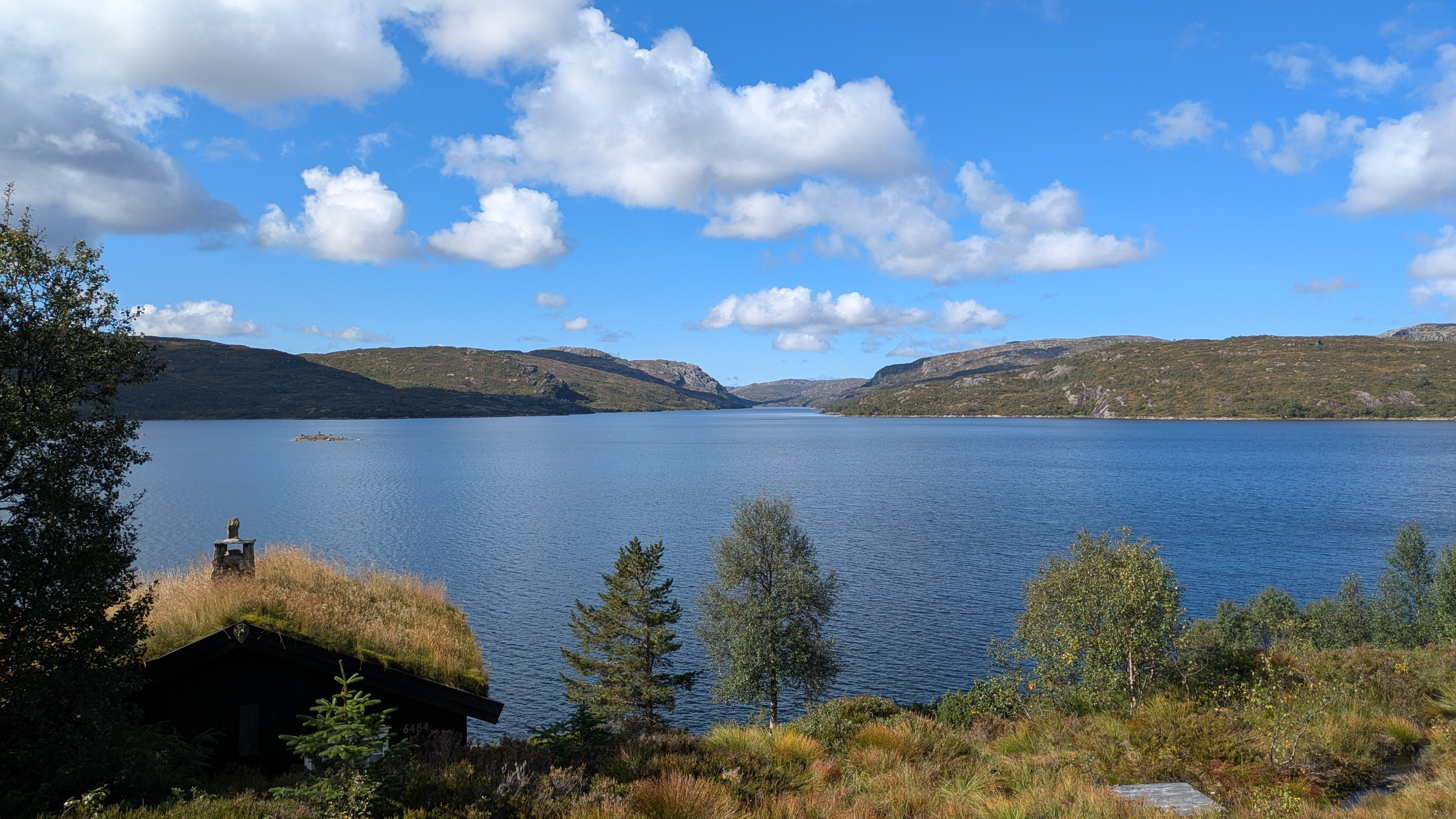
- Interactive map of Gravatn
- Location: Sirdal Municipality, Agder
- Coordinates: 58.89241°N 6.74903°E
- Primary inflows: Valevatn lake
- Primary outflows: Gravassåni river
- Basin countries: Norway
- Max. length: 8 kilometres (5.0 mi)
- Max. width: 2.2 kilometres (1.4 mi)
- Surface area: 5.33 km^{2} (2.06 sq mi)
- Shore length^{1}: 25.29 kilometres (15.71 mi)
- Surface elevation: 660 metres (2,170 ft)
- References: NVE
- ^{1} Shore length is not a well-defined measure.

Gravatn is a lake in Sirdal Municipality in Agder county, Norway. The 5.33-square-kilometre (2.06 sq mi) lake is located about 9 kilometres (5.6 mi) north of the small village of Lunde. The lake lies immediately south of the lake Valevatn, which flows out into Gravatn. The water in Gravatnis stopped by a dam on the south side. The water is regulated at an elevation of 660 metres (2,170 ft) and it flows out through the small river Gravassåni which is a tributary of the big river Sira.

== See also ==
- List of lakes in Norway
