= Lunde Church (Agder) =

Church in Agder, Norway

- Lunde kirke
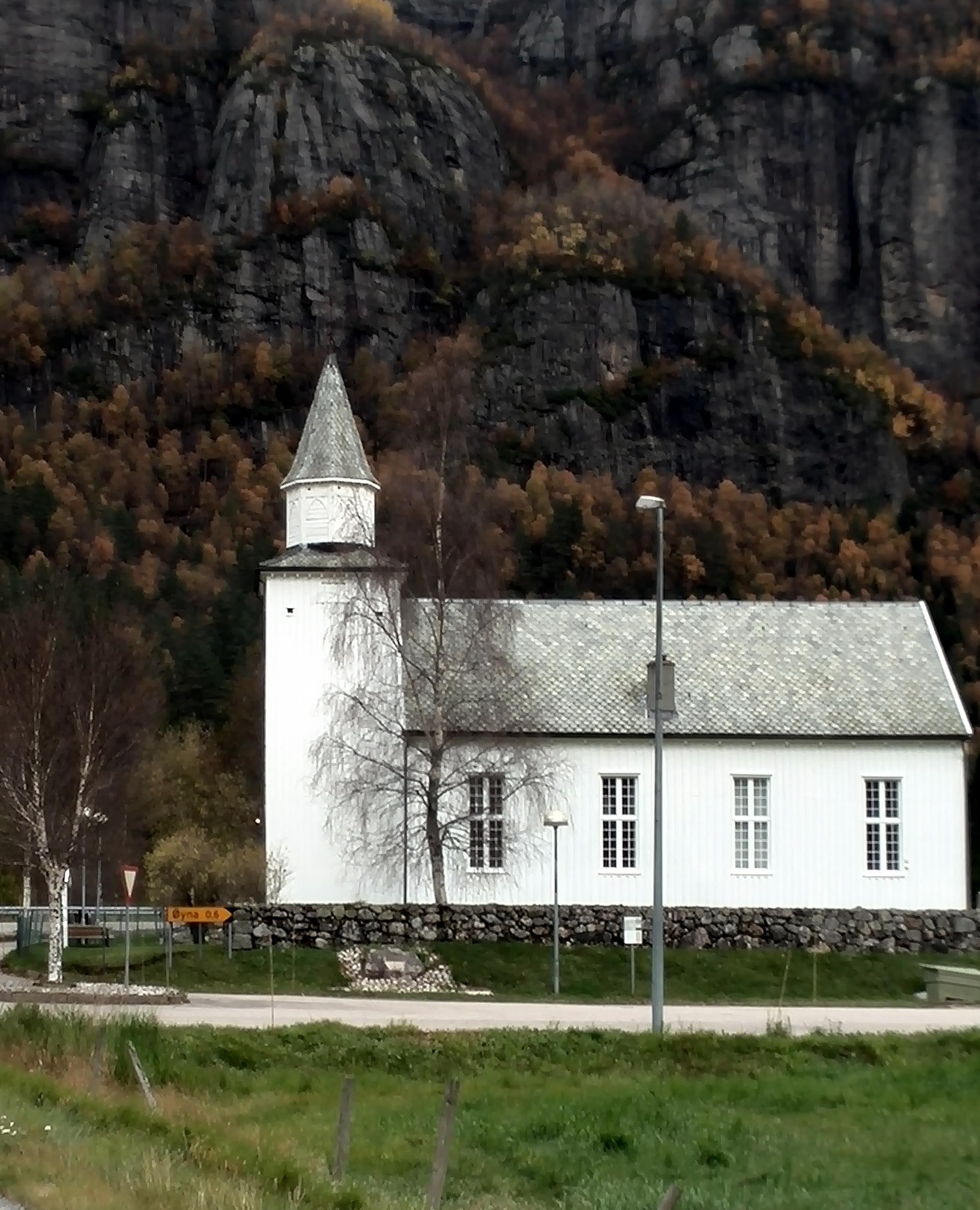
- View of the church
- Lunde Church
- 58.80846°N 06.76344°E
- Location: Sirdal Municipality, Agder
- Country: Norway
- Denomination: Church of Norway
- Churchmanship: Evangelical Lutheran

History
- Status: Parish church
- Founded: 1819
- Consecrated: 1 Oct 1873

Architecture
- Functional status: Active
- Architect: Hans Linstow
- Architectural type: Long church
- Completed: 1873; 153 years ago

Specifications
- Capacity: 250
- Materials: Wood

Administration
- Diocese: Agder og Telemark
- Deanery: Lister og Mandal prosti
- Parish: Sirdal
- Norwegian Cultural Heritage Site
- Type: Church
- Status: Listed
- ID: 84336

Lunde Church (Norwegian: Lunde kirke) is a parish church of the Church of Norway in the large Sirdal Municipality in Agder county, Norway. It is located in the village of Lunde in the northern part of the municipality. It one of the four churches in the Sirdal parish which is part of the Lister og Mandal prosti (deanery) in the Diocese of Agder og Telemark. The white, wooden church was built in a long church design in 1873 using plans drawn up by the architect Hans Linstow. The church seats about 250 people.

== History ==
A small chapel was built at Lunde in the upper Sirdalen valley in 1819. In the 1840s, plans were discussed to replace Tonstad Church and this chapel with a new, larger church in a more central location (at Hompland). These plans were ultimately rejected by the parish and instead, both churches would be rebuilt and enlarged. By a Royal Decree on 29 October 1847, Lunde chapel was approved as a parish church. Sirdal Municipality was created in 1849 and it became its own prestegjeld in 1854 with Tonstad Church designated as the main parish church and Lunde Church as an annex. The chapel building from 1819 was soon too small for the congregation, so a new church was built in 1873 (the present church). The newly reconstructed church was consecrated on 1 October 1873 by the Bishop Jacob von der Lippe.

== See also ==
- List of churches in Agder og Telemark
