= Sirdalen =

Valley in Agder, Norway

- Sirdal
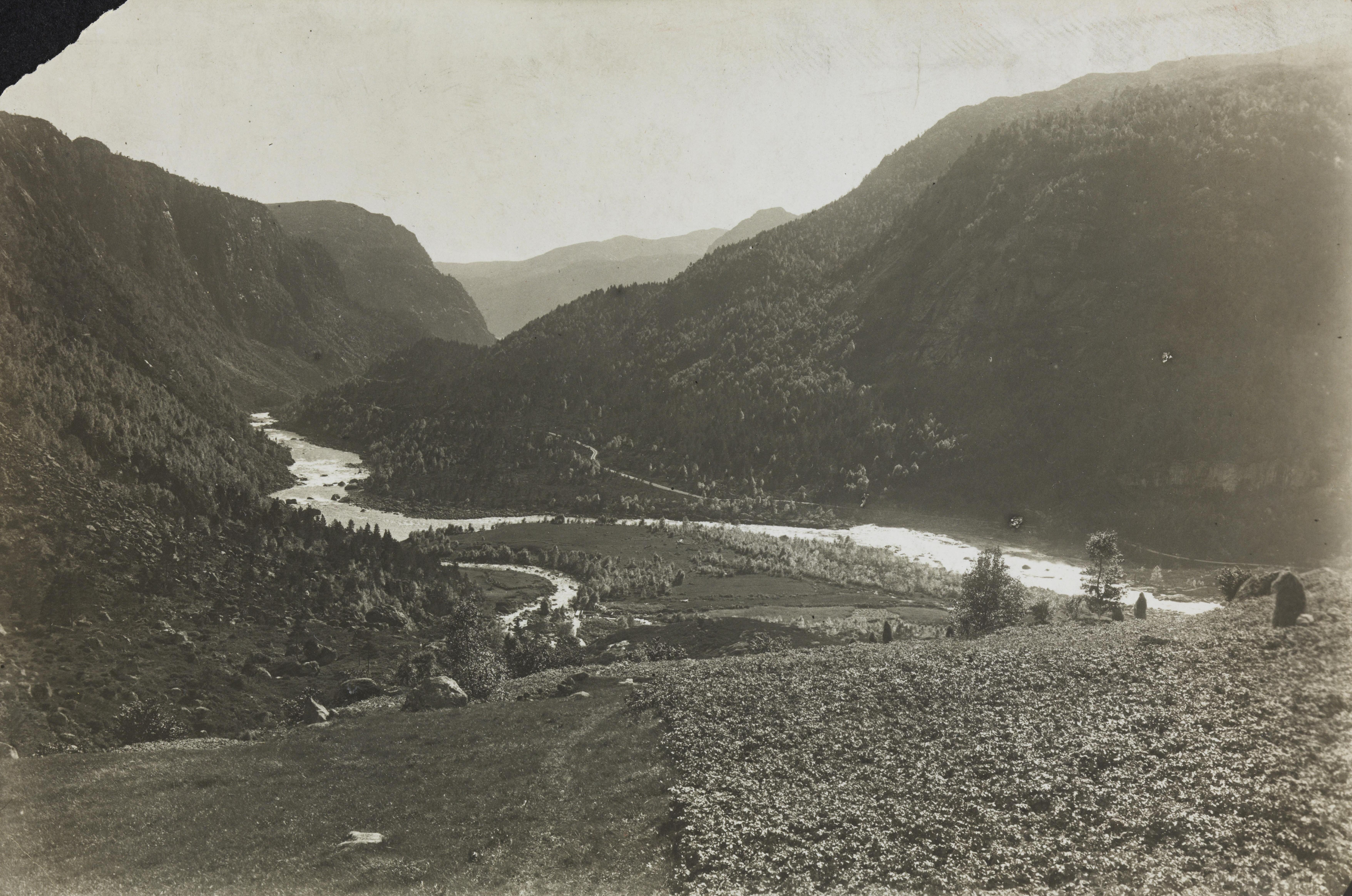
- Upper Sirdalen valley
- Length: 90 kilometres (56 mi) N-S

Geology
- Type: River valley

Geography
- Location: Agder, Norway
- Coordinates: 58.73782°N 6.74495°E
- River: Sira

Location
- Interactive map of Sirdalen

Sirdalen is a river valley in Agder county, Norway. The 90-kilometre (56 mi) long valley is located in Sirdal Municipality and Flekkefjord Municipality, and it extends from the lake Lundevatnet in the south to the Lyseheiane and Sirdalsheiane mountains in the north. The river Sira flows through the valley floor and the valley gets its name from this river.

The southern part of Sirdalen, from Lundevatnet to the village of Tonstad, is dominated by the 27-kilometre (17 mi) long and narrow lake Sirdalsvatnet, which is part of the Sira river system. Between Tonstad and Handeland, the valley is very narrow and cramped, while northward from Handeland it becomes more open and gradually merges into the open landscape of the surrounding mountains.

The Sira River and the neighboring Kvina River and most of their tributaries have been developed for power production. There are several large power reservoirs that have been dammed in and in the mountains surrounding the Sirdalen valley including the lakes Svartevatn, Gravatn, and Valevatn. The main Tonstad Hydroelectric Power Station in Tonstad is Norway's largest in terms of production.

Along the sides of the valley in upper Sirdalen, especially the Tjørhom – Ådneram area, there are many ski and alpine resorts. The area is popular with ski tourists, especially from Rogaland and Agder counties.
