= Kvævemoen Chapel =

Church in Agder, Norway

- Kvævemoen kapell
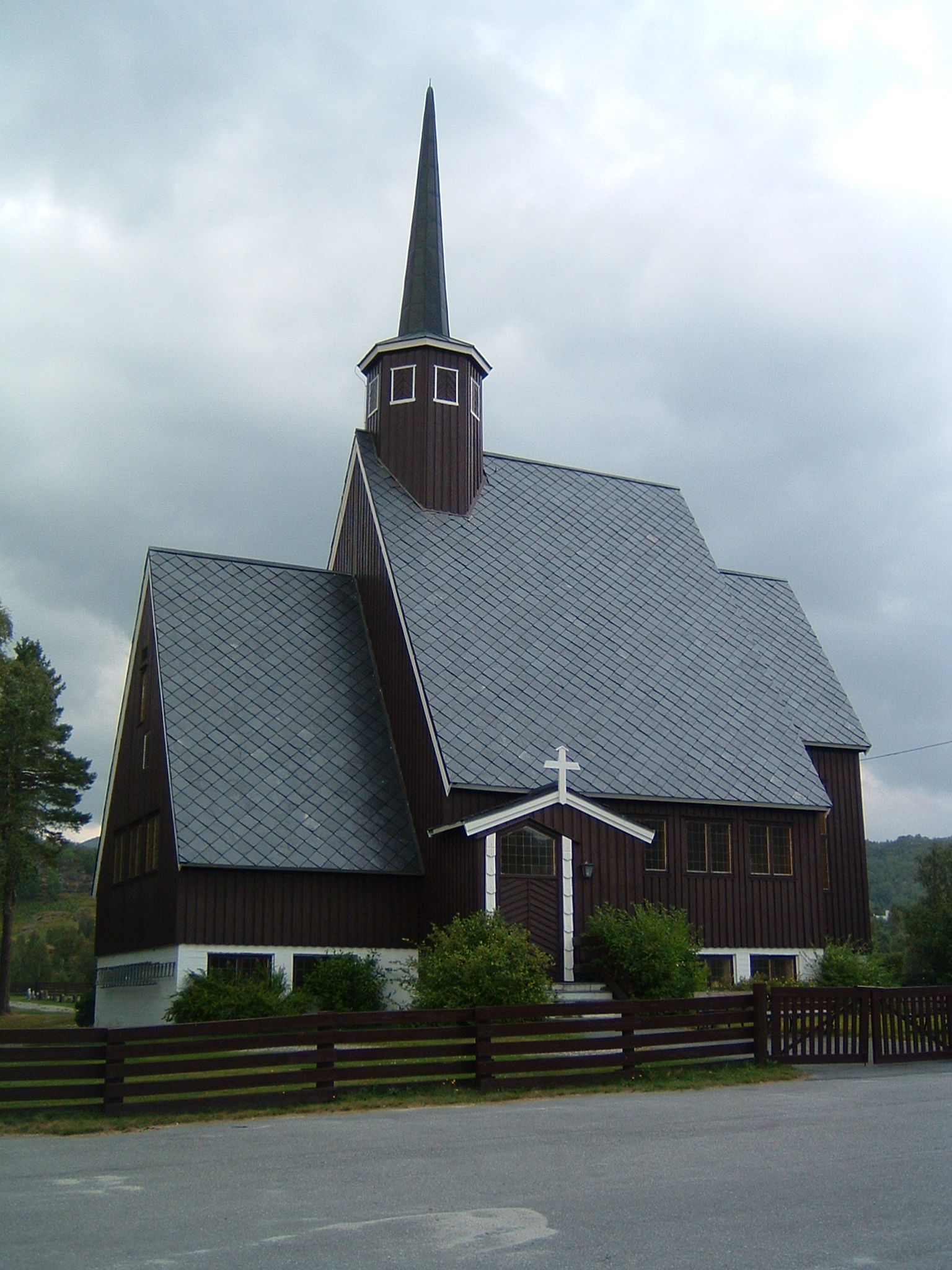
- View of the church
- Kvævemoen Chapel
- 58.94165°N 6.91639°E
- Location: Sirdal Municipality, Agder
- Country: Norway
- Denomination: Church of Norway
- Churchmanship: Evangelical Lutheran

History
- Status: Parish church
- Founded: 1962
- Consecrated: 31 May 1962

Architecture
- Functional status: Active
- Architect: Waldemar Hansteen
- Architectural type: Long church
- Groundbreaking: 9 May 1960
- Completed: 1962; 64 years ago

Specifications
- Capacity: 100
- Materials: Wood

Administration
- Diocese: Agder og Telemark
- Deanery: Lister og Mandal prosti
- Parish: Sirdal
- Norwegian Cultural Heritage Site
- Type: Church
- Status: Not protected
- ID: 84875

Kvævemoen Church (Norwegian: Kvævemoen kirke) is a parish church of the Church of Norway in the large Sirdal Municipality in Agder county, Norway. It is located in the village of Kvæven. It one of the four churches in the Sirdal parish which is part of the Lister og Mandal prosti (deanery) in the Diocese of Agder og Telemark. The brown, wooden church was built in a long church design in 1962 using plans drawn up by the architect Valdemar Scheel Hansteen. The church seats about 100 people.

== History ==
Work on the church began on 9 May 1960 when the foundation stone was laid by the Bishop of Stavanger, Karl Marthinussen. The church was consecrated on 31 May 1962. There is room for about 100 people in the main sanctuary. Downstairs, there is a dining room, kitchen, cloakroom, and bathroom.

== See also ==
- List of churches in Agder og Telemark
