= Gunnar Tjomlid =

Norwegian blogger, author and sceptic (born 1974)

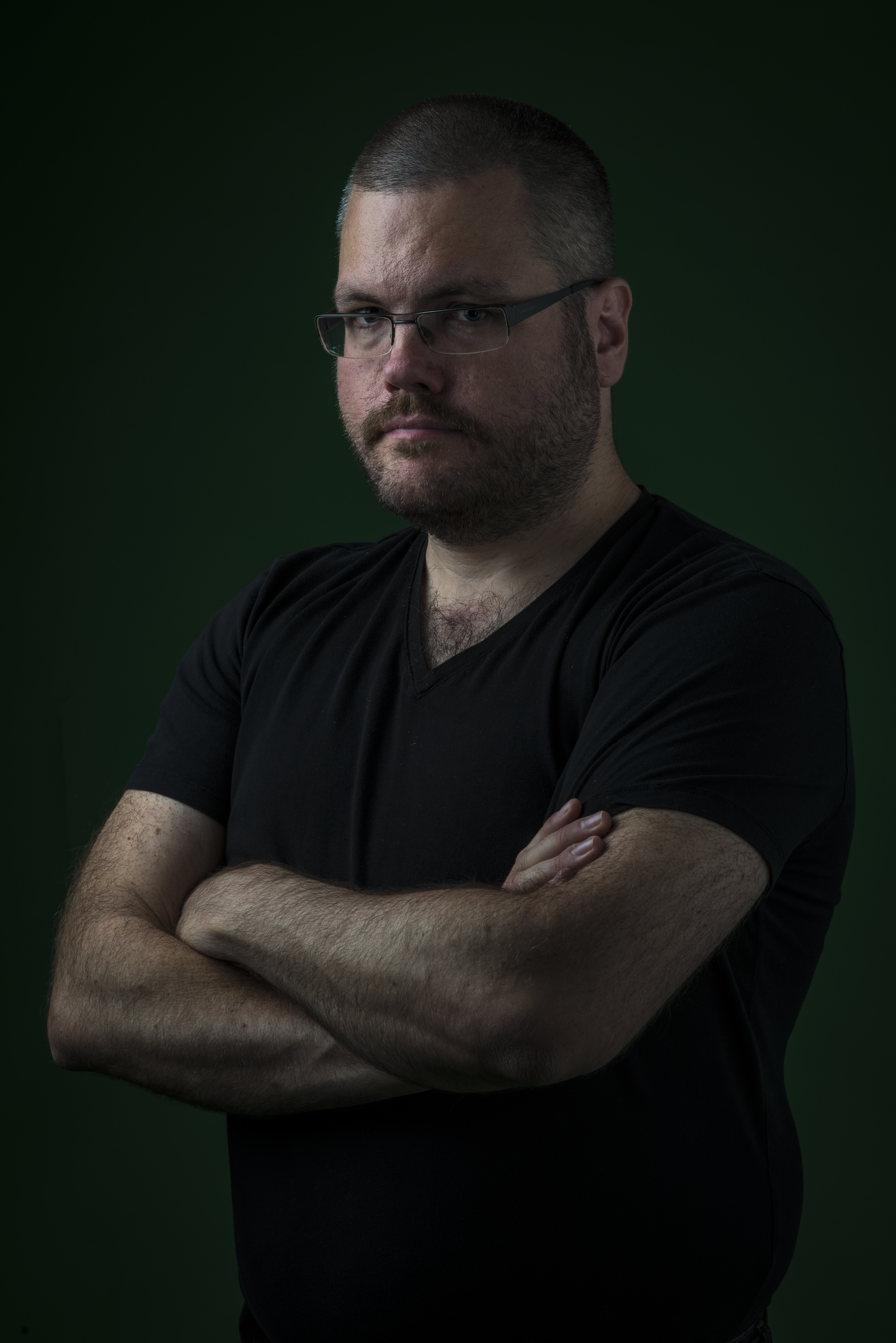
- Born: 3 August 1974 (age 51); Dar-es-Salaam, Tanzania
- Occupations: Writer, skeptical activist

Gunnar Roland Tjomlid (born 3 August 1974) is a Norwegian skeptic, secular humanist blogger, and author.

== Early life ==
Tjomlid was born in Dar-es-Salaam, Tanzania, where he lived until he was two years old. He then mostly resided in the village of Tonstad in Norway. He was a Christian before becoming an atheist.

== Blogging ==
He started the blog Unfiltered Perception in 2006, which changed name to Saksynt in 2013.

He was on the panel of Norwegian podcast Saltklypa from 2010 to 2012.

In 2010 he received the award Tordenbloggen and in 2014 he received an award in Vixen Blog Awards 2013.

== Bibliography ==
- Placebodefekten – Hvorfor alternativ behandling virker som den virker, Humanist Forlag ISBN 9788282820516
- Håndbok i krisemaksimering ISBN 9788243010741
