= Valevatn =

Lake in Sirdal, Norway

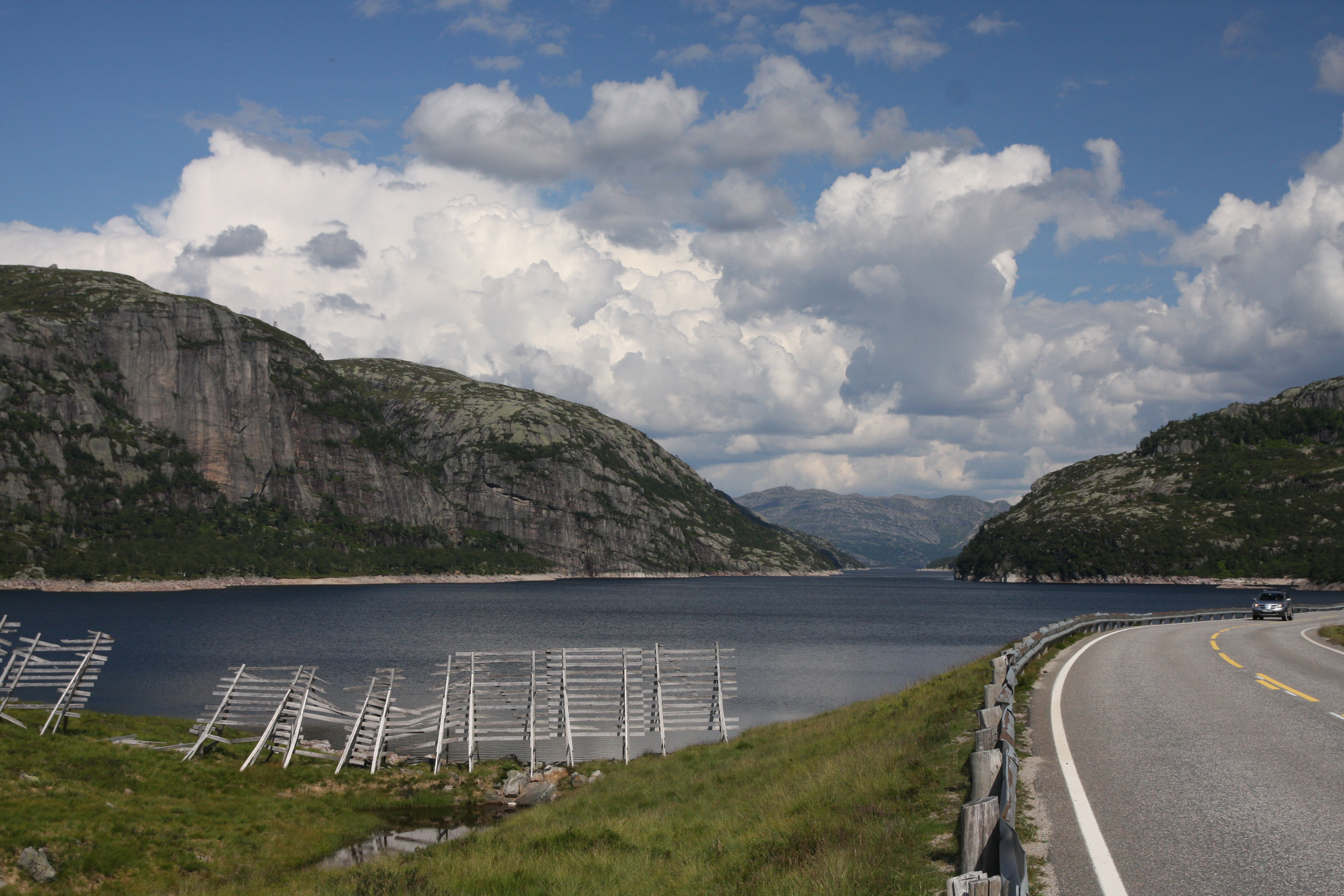
- Interactive map of Valevatn
- Location: Sirdal Municipality, Agder
- Coordinates: 58.93937°N 6.83747°E
- Basin countries: Norway
- Max. length: 14 kilometres (8.7 mi)
- Max. width: 1 kilometre (0.62 mi)
- Surface area: 6.97 km^{2} (2.69 sq mi)
- Shore length^{1}: 46.73 kilometres (29.04 mi)
- Surface elevation: 660 metres (2,170 ft)
- References: NVE
- ^{1} Shore length is not a well-defined measure.

Valevatn is a lake in Sirdal Municipality in Agder county, Norway. The 6.97-square-kilometre (2.69 sq mi) lake lies just north of the lake Gravatn and a short distance west of the village of Kvæven. There are two dams on the east side of the L-shaped lake. The lake drains into the lake Gravatn and the river Sira which runs just east of the lake.

== See also ==
- List of lakes in Norway
