= Sirdal Municipality =

Municipality in Agder, Norway

Sirdal Municipality Sirdal kommune
- Municipality
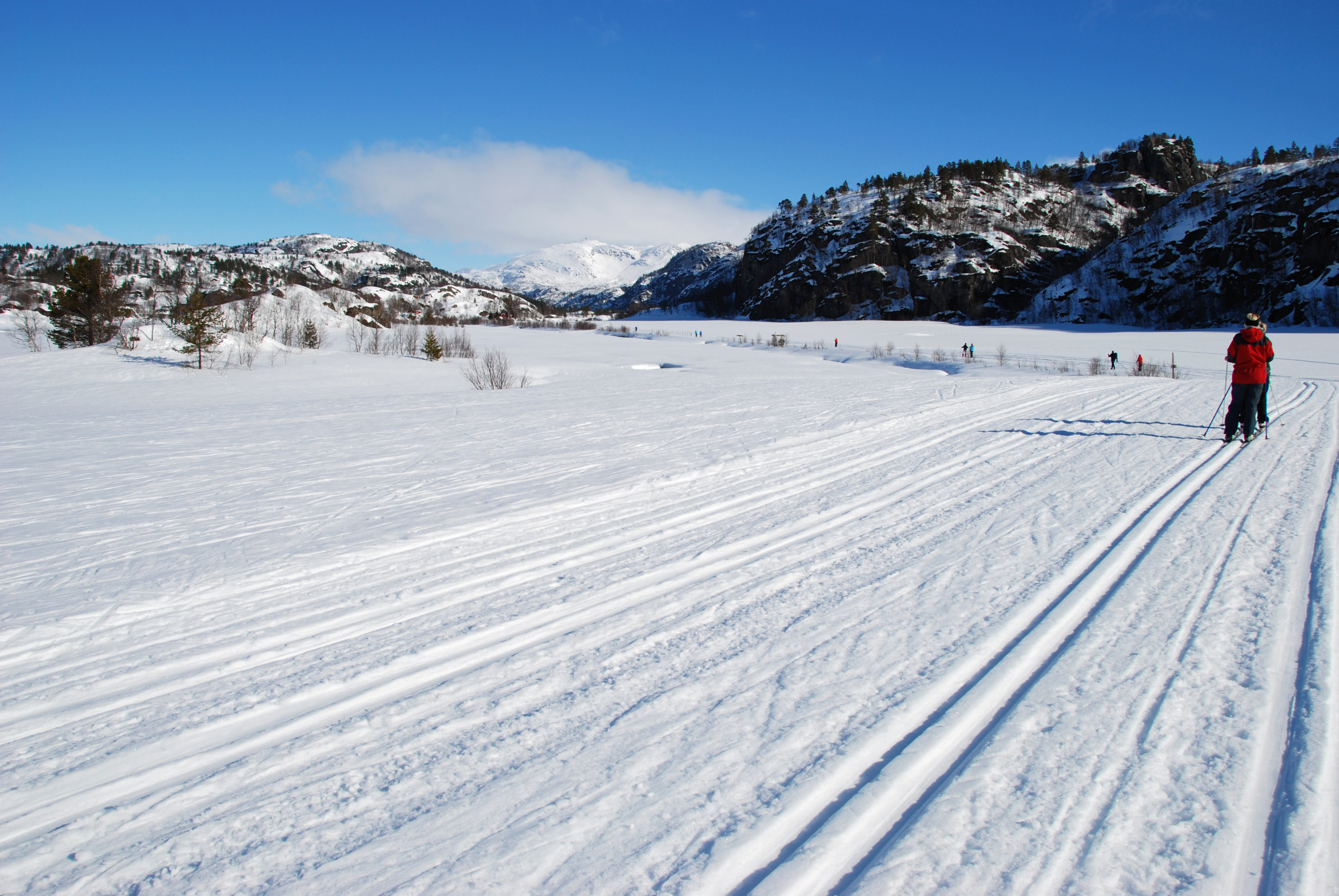
- Ski-tracks in Sirdal

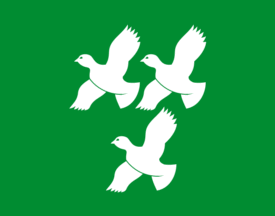
- Flag Coat of arms

- Agder within Norway

- Sirdal within Agder
- Coordinates: 58°51′43″N 06°48′48″E
- Country: Norway
- County: Agder
- District: Lister
- Established: 1849
  - Preceded by: Bakke Municipality
- Disestablished: 1 January 1905
  - Succeeded by: Tonstad and Øvre Sirdal
- Re-established: 1 January 1960
  - Preceded by: Bakke, Tonstad, and Øvre Sirdal
- Administrative centre: Tonstad

Government
  - Mayor (2019): Jonny Liland (Ap)

Area
  - Total: 1,554.28 km^{2} (600.11 sq mi)
  - Land: 1,372.55 km^{2} (529.94 sq mi)
  - Water: 181.73 km^{2} (70.17 sq mi) 11.7%
  - Rank: #52 in Norway
- Highest elevation: 1,433.75 m (4,703.9 ft)

Population (2026)
  - Total: 1,911
  - Rank: #222 in Norway
  - Density: 1.4/km^{2} (3.6/sq mi)
  - Change (10 years): ▲ +4.3%
- Demonym: Sirdøl

Official language
  - Norwegian form: Neutral
- Time zone: UTC+01:00 (CET)
  - Summer (DST): UTC+02:00 (CEST)
- ISO 3166 code: NO-4228
- Website: www.sirdal.kommune.no

Sirdal is a municipality in Agder county, Norway. It is located in the northwestern part of the traditional district of Lister. The administrative centre of the municipality is the village of Tonstad. Other villages in the municipality include Bjørnestad, Haughom, Kvæven, Lunde, and Tjørhom.

The 1,554.28-square-kilometre (600.11 sq mi) municipality is the 52nd largest by area out of the 357 municipalities in Norway. Sirdal Municipality is the 288th most populous municipality in Norway with a population of 1,911. The municipality's population density is 1.4 inhabitants per square kilometre (3.6/sq mi) and its population has increased by 4.3% over the previous 10-year period.

== General information ==
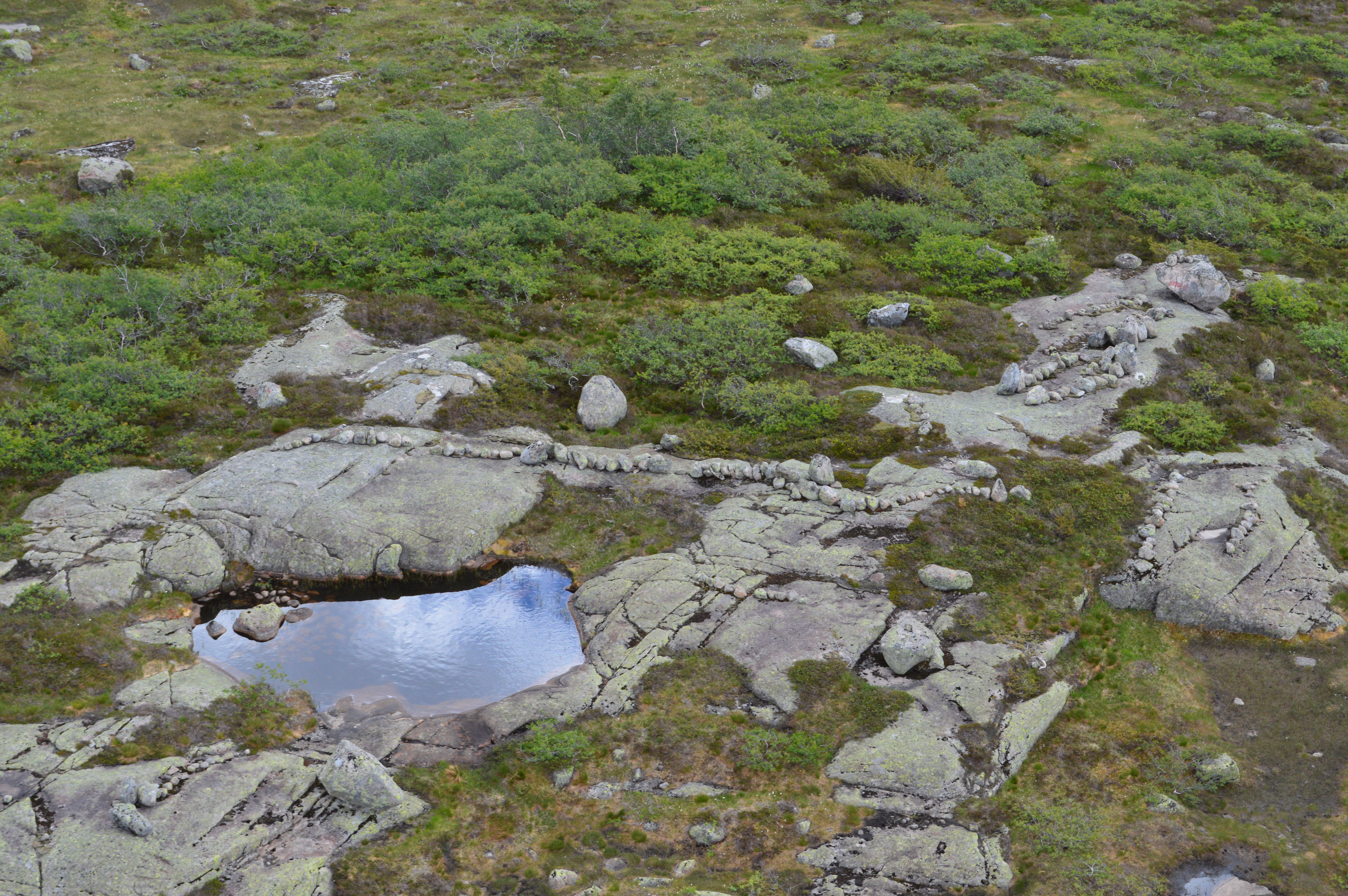
Landscape of Sirdal

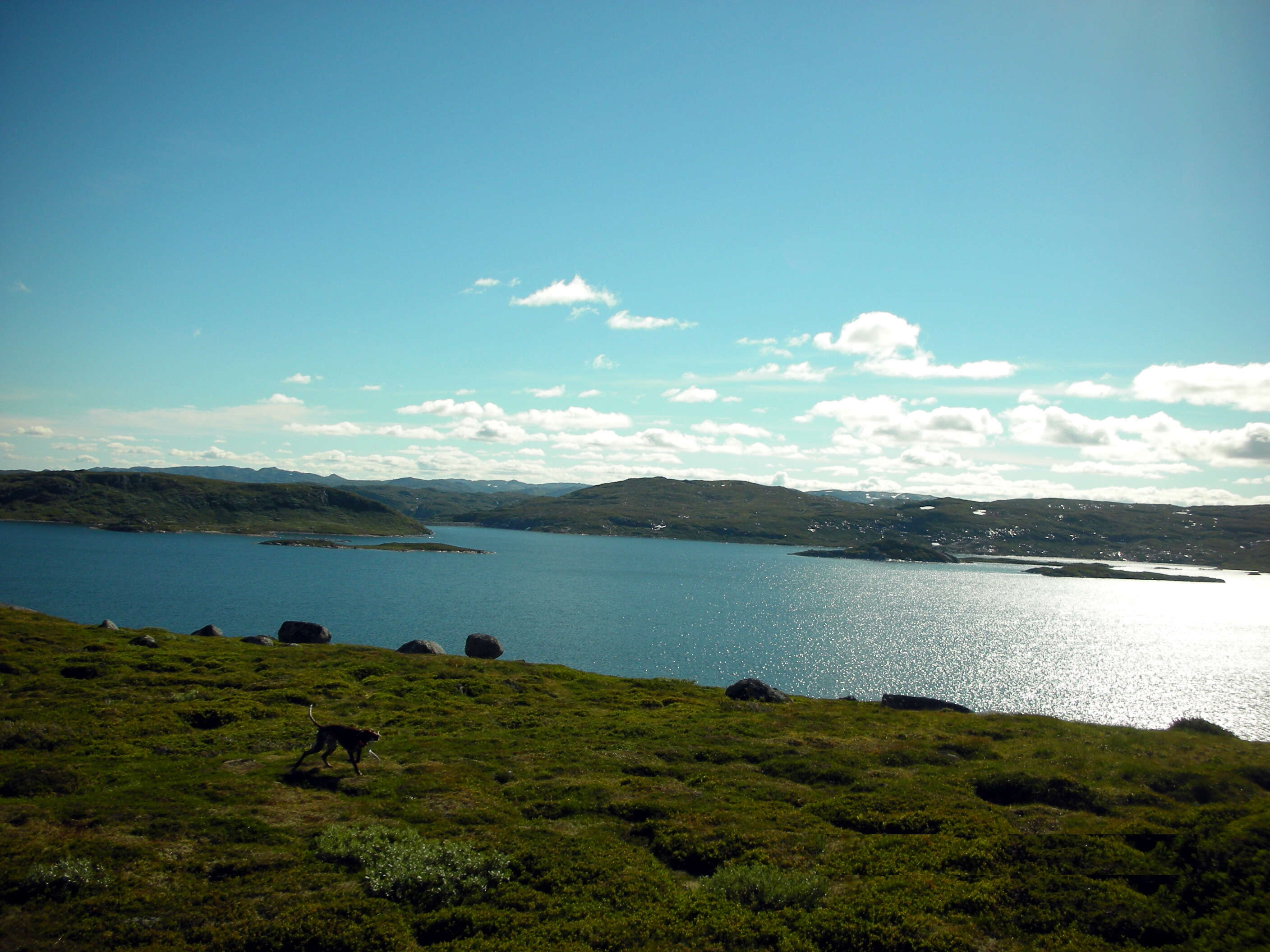
View of the Rosskreppfjorden

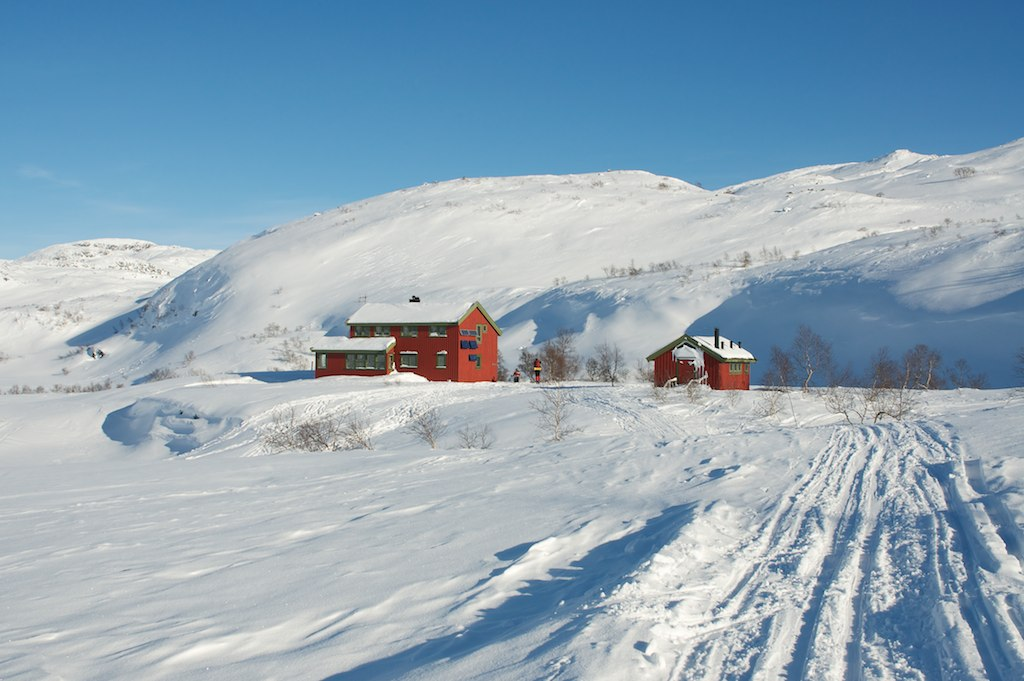
Winter landscape in Sirdal

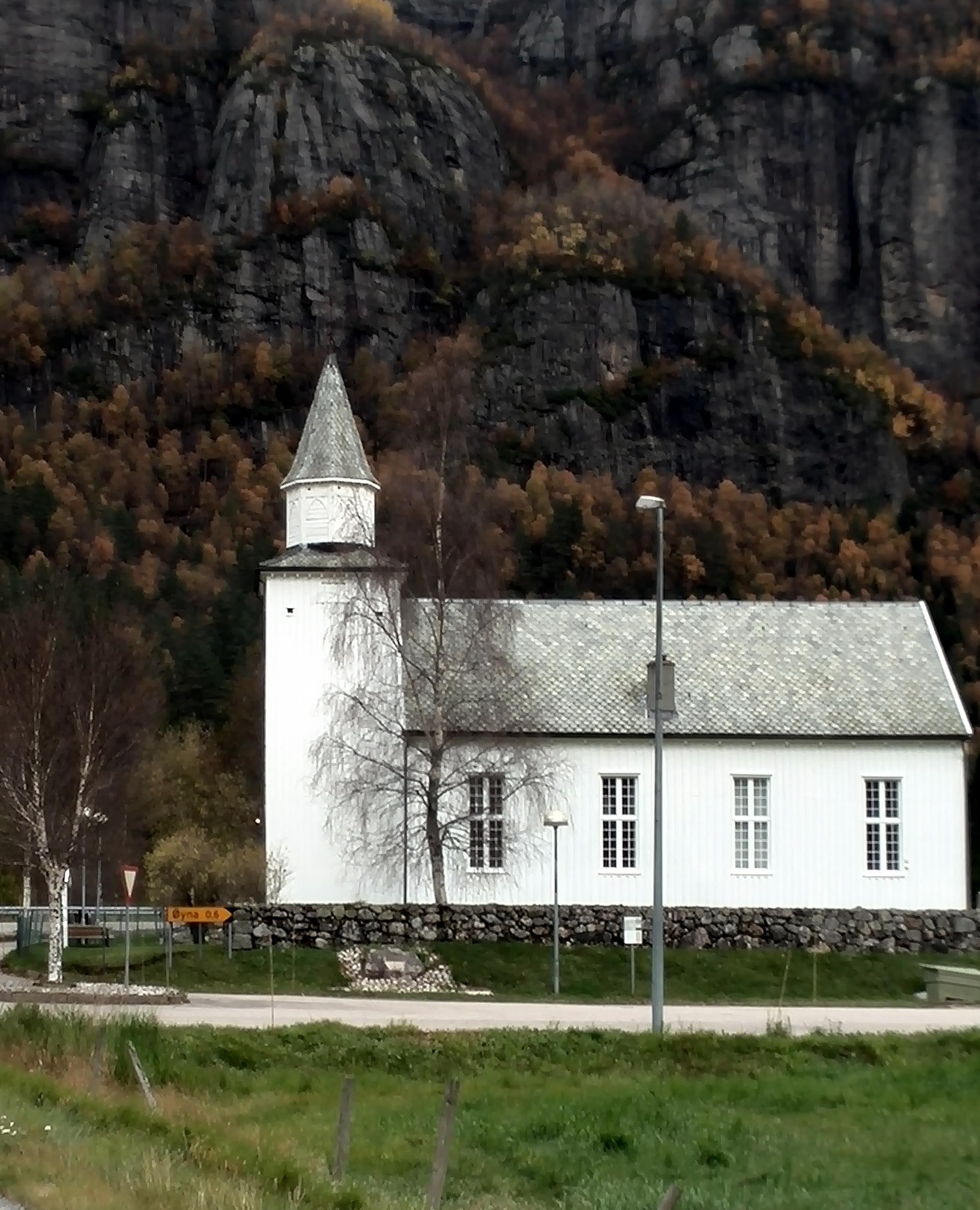
Lunde Church

The old parish of Sirdal was first established as a municipality in 1849 when the large Bakke Municipality was divided into two: the northern part (population: 1,804) became the new Sirdal Municipality and the southern part (population: 2,597) remained as a smaller Sirdal Municipality.

On 1 January 1903, a small area of eastern Sirdal Municipality (population: 63) was transferred to the neighboring Fjotland Municipality. On 1 January 1905, Sirdal Municipality was dissolved and its territories were divided into two new municipalities: the southern part (population: 828) became the new Tonstad Municipality and the northern part (population: 753) became the new Øvre Sirdal Municipality.

During the 1960s, there were many municipal mergers across Norway due to the work of the Schei Committee. On 1 January 1960, Sirdal Municipality was re-created when the following areas were merged together:

- all of Tonstad Municipality (population: 651)
- all of Øvre Sirdal Municipality (population: 549)
- the Øksendal area of Bakke Municipality (population: 226)

On 1 January 1987, the Virak and Espetveit areas of northern Flekkefjord Municipality (population: 41) were transferred to Sirdal Municipality.

Historically, this municipality was part of the old Vest-Agder county. On 1 January 2020, the municipality became a part of the newly-formed Agder county (after Aust-Agder and Vest-Agder counties were merged).

=== Name ===
The municipality (originally the parish) is named after the Sirdalen valley (Old Norse: Sírudalr) since the valley runs through the municipality. The first element is the genitive case of the river name Síra (now the Sira river). The river name has an unknown meaning, but it could be something like "strong stream". The last element is dalr which means "valley" or "dale".

=== Coat of arms ===
The coat of arms was granted on 17 January 1986. The official blazon is "Vert, three ptarmigans volant argent" (Norwegian: I grønt tre oppflygande sølv ryper, 2 - 1). This means the arms have a green field (background) and the charge is a willow ptarmigan (Lagopus lagopus). The ptarmigan has a tincture of argent which means it is commonly colored white, but if it is made out of metal, then silver is used. The green color in the field and the ptarmigans were chosen as a symbol for the hills and moorland which make up the largest part of the municipality. The willow ptarmigan is a typical bird for the area. The arms were designed by Stein Davidsen. The municipal flag has the same design as the coat of arms.

=== Churches ===
The Church of Norway has one parish (sokn) within Sirdal Municipality. It is part of the Lister og Mandal prosti (deanery) in the Diocese of Agder og Telemark.

Churches in Sirdal Municipality
Parish (sokn)	Church name	Location of the church	Year built
Sirdal	Haughom Chapel	Haughom	1930
Sirdal	Kvævemoen Chapel	Kvæven	1962
Sirdal	Lunde Church	Lunde	1873
Sirdal	Tonstad Church	Tonstad	1852

== Geography ==
Sirdal Municipality is the largest municipality by area in Agder, and it includes the westernmost valley in Agder county. Bykle Municipality is located to the north; Valle Municipality is located to the northeast; Bygland Municipality and Kvinesdal Municipality are located to the east; Flekkefjord Municipality is located to the south; Lund Municipality and Eigersund Municipality are located to the southwest (both in Rogaland county); Bjerkreim Municipality and Gjesdal Municipality are located to the west (both in Rogaland county); and Sandnes Municipality (also in Rogaland county) is located to the northwest.

Lakes in the municipality include Gravatn, Kulivatnet, Kvifjorden, Øyarvatnet, Rosskreppfjorden, Sirdalsvatnet, and Valevatn. The highest point in the municipality is the 1,433.75-metre (4,703.9 ft) tall mountain Urdalsknuten, at the northern end of the municipality.

In 1990, the mountain road opened between the Sirdalen valley and the Setesdal valley over the Suleskard mountain pass. It connected Sirdal Municipality to the village of Brokke in the neighboring Valle Municipality to the east. It shortened the distance from Oslo to Stavanger by 110 kilometres (68 mi) in the summer, and the road passes through barren, glacier-scoured highland. As it passes by the Rosskreppfjorden, it ascends to over 1,000 metres (3,300 ft) above sea level.

=== Climate ===
Climate data for Tonstad 1961-90
Month	Jan	Feb	Mar	Apr	May	Jun	Jul	Aug	Sep	Oct	Nov	Dec	Year
Daily mean °C (°F)	−2.0 (28.4)	−2.2 (28.0)	0.8 (33.4)	4.4 (39.9)	9.8 (49.6)	13.4 (56.1)	15.0 (59.0)	14.4 (57.9)	10.7 (51.3)	6.9 (44.4)	2.3 (36.1)	−1.3 (29.7)	6.0 (42.8)
Average precipitation mm (inches)	185 (7.3)	131 (5.2)	139 (5.5)	74 (2.9)	102 (4.0)	99 (3.9)	109 (4.3)	147 (5.8)	213 (8.4)	248 (9.8)	239 (9.4)	204 (8.0)	1,890 (74.4)
Source: Norwegian Meteorological Institute

== Government ==
Sirdal Municipality is responsible for primary education (through 10th grade), outpatient health services, senior citizen services, welfare and other social services, zoning, economic development, and municipal roads and utilities. The municipality is governed by a municipal council of directly elected representatives. The mayor is indirectly elected by a vote of the municipal council. The municipality is under the jurisdiction of the Dalane District Court and the Gulating Court of Appeal.

=== Municipal council ===
The municipal council (Kommunestyre) of Sirdal Municipality is made up of 19 representatives that are elected to four-year terms. The tables below show the current and historical composition of the council by political party.

Sirdal kommunestyre 2023–2027
Party name (in Norwegian)	Number of representatives
Labour Party (Arbeiderpartiet)	6
Progress Party (Fremskrittspartiet)	1
Conservative Party (Høyre)	3
Christian Democratic Party (Kristelig Folkeparti)	3
Centre Party (Senterpartiet)	5
Liberal Party (Venstre)	1
Total number of members:	19

Sirdal kommunestyre 2019–2023
Party name (in Norwegian)	Number of representatives
Labour Party (Arbeiderpartiet)	8
Conservative Party (Høyre)	3
Christian Democratic Party (Kristelig Folkeparti)	2
Centre Party (Senterpartiet)	4
Liberal Party (Venstre)	1
Joint list of the Progress Party and the Sirdal list (Fremskrittspartiet og Sirdalslisten)	1
Total number of members:	19

Sirdal kommunestyre 2015–2019
Party name (in Norwegian)	Number of representatives
Labour Party (Arbeiderpartiet)	6
Conservative Party (Høyre)	3
Christian Democratic Party (Kristelig Folkeparti)	3
Centre Party (Senterpartiet)	4
Liberal Party (Venstre)	1
Sirdal local list (Sirdal Bygdeliste)	2
Total number of members:	19

Sirdal kommunestyre 2011–2015
Party name (in Norwegian)	Number of representatives
Labour Party (Arbeiderpartiet)	5
Progress Party (Fremskrittspartiet)	2
Conservative Party (Høyre)	2
Christian Democratic Party (Kristelig Folkeparti)	3
Centre Party (Senterpartiet)	3
Liberal Party (Venstre)	1
Rural development list (Bygdeutviklingslista)	3
Total number of members:	19

Sirdal kommunestyre 2007–2011
Party name (in Norwegian)	Number of representatives
Labour Party (Arbeiderpartiet)	3
Progress Party (Fremskrittspartiet)	3
Conservative Party (Høyre)	2
Christian Democratic Party (Kristelig Folkeparti)	4
Centre Party (Senterpartiet)	5
Socialist Left Party (Sosialistisk Venstreparti)	1
Liberal Party (Venstre)	1
Total number of members:	19

Sirdal kommunestyre 2003–2007
Party name (in Norwegian)	Number of representatives
Labour Party (Arbeiderpartiet)	3
Progress Party (Fremskrittspartiet)	3
Conservative Party (Høyre)	3
Christian Democratic Party (Kristelig Folkeparti)	3
Centre Party (Senterpartiet)	4
Socialist Left Party (Sosialistisk Venstreparti)	2
Liberal Party (Venstre)	1
Total number of members:	19

Sirdal kommunestyre 1999–2003
Party name (in Norwegian)	Number of representatives
Labour Party (Arbeiderpartiet)	4
Progress Party (Fremskrittspartiet)	1
Conservative Party (Høyre)	4
Christian Democratic Party (Kristelig Folkeparti)	3
Centre Party (Senterpartiet)	5
Liberal Party (Venstre)	2
Total number of members:	19

Sirdal kommunestyre 1995–1999
Party name (in Norwegian)	Number of representatives
Labour Party (Arbeiderpartiet)	4
Conservative Party (Høyre)	3
Christian Democratic Party (Kristelig Folkeparti)	3
Centre Party (Senterpartiet)	5
Liberal Party (Venstre)	4
Total number of members:	19

Sirdal kommunestyre 1991–1995
Party name (in Norwegian)	Number of representatives
Labour Party (Arbeiderpartiet)	4
Conservative Party (Høyre)	3
Christian Democratic Party (Kristelig Folkeparti)	3
Centre Party (Senterpartiet)	6
Liberal Party (Venstre)	3
Total number of members:	19

Sirdal kommunestyre 1987–1991
Party name (in Norwegian)	Number of representatives
Labour Party (Arbeiderpartiet)	4
Conservative Party (Høyre)	4
Christian Democratic Party (Kristelig Folkeparti)	3
Centre Party (Senterpartiet)	4
Liberal Party (Venstre)	4
Total number of members:	19

Sirdal kommunestyre 1983–1987
Party name (in Norwegian)	Number of representatives
Labour Party (Arbeiderpartiet)	4
Conservative Party (Høyre)	3
Christian Democratic Party (Kristelig Folkeparti)	3
Centre Party (Senterpartiet)	5
Liberal Party (Venstre)	3
Sirdal local list (Sirdal Bygdeliste)	1
Total number of members:	19

Sirdal kommunestyre 1979–1983
Party name (in Norwegian)	Number of representatives
Labour Party (Arbeiderpartiet)	3
Conservative Party (Høyre)	4
Christian Democratic Party (Kristelig Folkeparti)	4
Centre Party (Senterpartiet)	5
Liberal Party (Venstre)	1
Sirdal local list (Sirdal bygdeliste)	2
Total number of members:	19

Sirdal kommunestyre 1975–1979
Party name (in Norwegian)	Number of representatives
Labour Party (Arbeiderpartiet)	3
Conservative Party (Høyre)	1
Centre Party (Senterpartiet)	7
Liberal Party (Venstre)	2
Joint list of the Christian Democratic Party (Kristelig Folkeparti) and New People's Party (Nye Folkepartiet)	3
Sirdal local list (Sirdal Bygdeliste)	3
Total number of members:	19

Sirdal kommunestyre 1971–1975
Party name (in Norwegian)	Number of representatives
Labour Party (Arbeiderpartiet)	3
Christian Democratic Party (Kristelig Folkeparti)	2
Centre Party (Senterpartiet)	7
Liberal Party (Venstre)	3
Local List(s) (Lokale lister)	4
Total number of members:	19

Sirdal kommunestyre 1967–1971
Party name (in Norwegian)	Number of representatives
Labour Party (Arbeiderpartiet)	5
Christian Democratic Party (Kristelig Folkeparti)	1
Centre Party (Senterpartiet)	7
Liberal Party (Venstre)	3
List of workers, fishermen, and small farmholders (Arbeidere, fiskere, småbrukere liste)	1
Local List(s) (Lokale lister)	2
Total number of members:	19

Sirdal kommunestyre 1963–1967
Party name (in Norwegian)	Number of representatives
Labour Party (Arbeiderpartiet)	3
Communist Party (Kommunistiske Parti)	2
Centre Party (Senterpartiet)	8
Liberal Party (Venstre)	4
Local List(s) (Lokale lister)	2
Total number of members:	19

Sirdal kommunestyre 1959–1963
Party name (in Norwegian)	Number of representatives
Labour Party (Arbeiderpartiet)	2
Christian Democratic Party (Kristelig Folkeparti)	3
Socialist People's Party (Sosialistisk Folkeparti)	4
Joint List(s) of Non-Socialist Parties (Borgerlige Felleslister)	10
Total number of members:	19

=== Mayors ===
The mayor (Norwegian: ordfører) of Sirdal Municipality is the political leader of the municipality and the chairperson of the municipal council. The following people have held this position:

- 1849–1850: Ommund Carlsen Fintland
- 1850–1859: Carl Asbjørnsen Liland
- 1859–1861: Evert Olsen Tonstad
- 1861–1863: Carl Asbjørnsen Liland
- 1863–1865: Peder Torjesen Ousdal
- 1866–1868: Rev. Hans Petter Blix Rynning
- 1869–1871: Peder Torjesen Ousdal
- 1871–1873: Torkel Ommundsen Fintland
- 1873–1875: Rev. Hans Petter Blix Rynning
- 1875–1877: Carl Asbjørnsen Liland
- 1877–1879: Torkel Ommundsen Fintland
- 1879–1881: Ole Evertsen Tonstad
- 1881–1890: Sigbjørn Ommundsen Bjunes
- 1891–1892: Carl Ommundsen Fintland
- 1893–1894: Rev. Bernt Andreas Lindeland
- 1895–1897: Sigbjørn Ommundsen Bjunes
- 1897–1898: Rev. Bernt Andreas Lindeland
- 1899–1901: Peder Iversen Ousdal
- 1902–1904: Carl Ommundsen Fintland
- (1905–1959: Municipality dissolved)
- 1960–1963: Erik Kvæven
- 1964–1995: Sven Tjørhom (Sp)
- 1995–2003: Torjus Kvæven (Sp)
- 2003–2011: Thor Jørgen Tjørhom (Sp)
- 2011–2015: Jonny Liland (Ap)
- 2015–2019: Thor Jørgen Tjørhom (Sp)
- 2019–present: Jonny Liland (Ap)

== Economy ==
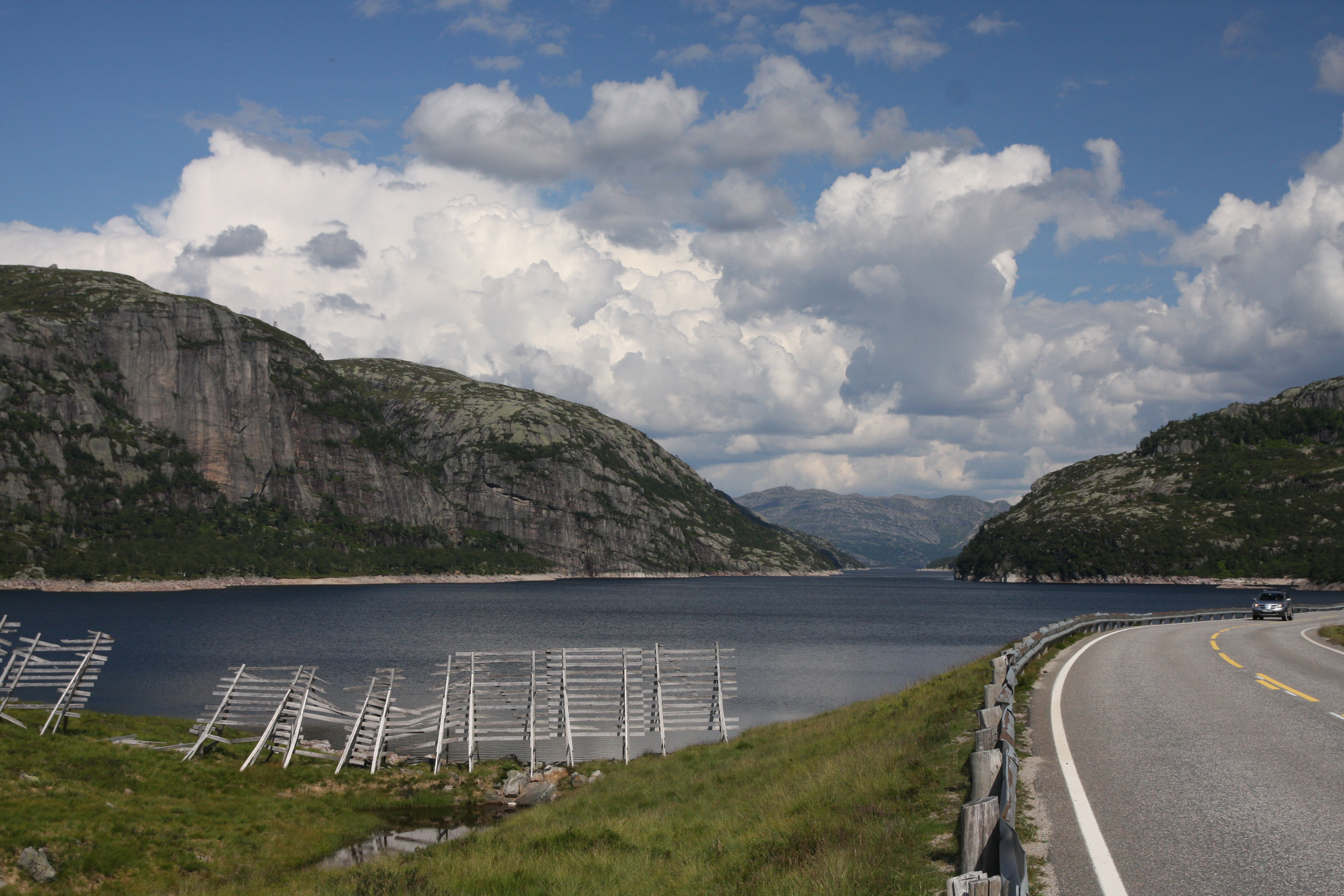
View of the lake Valevatn

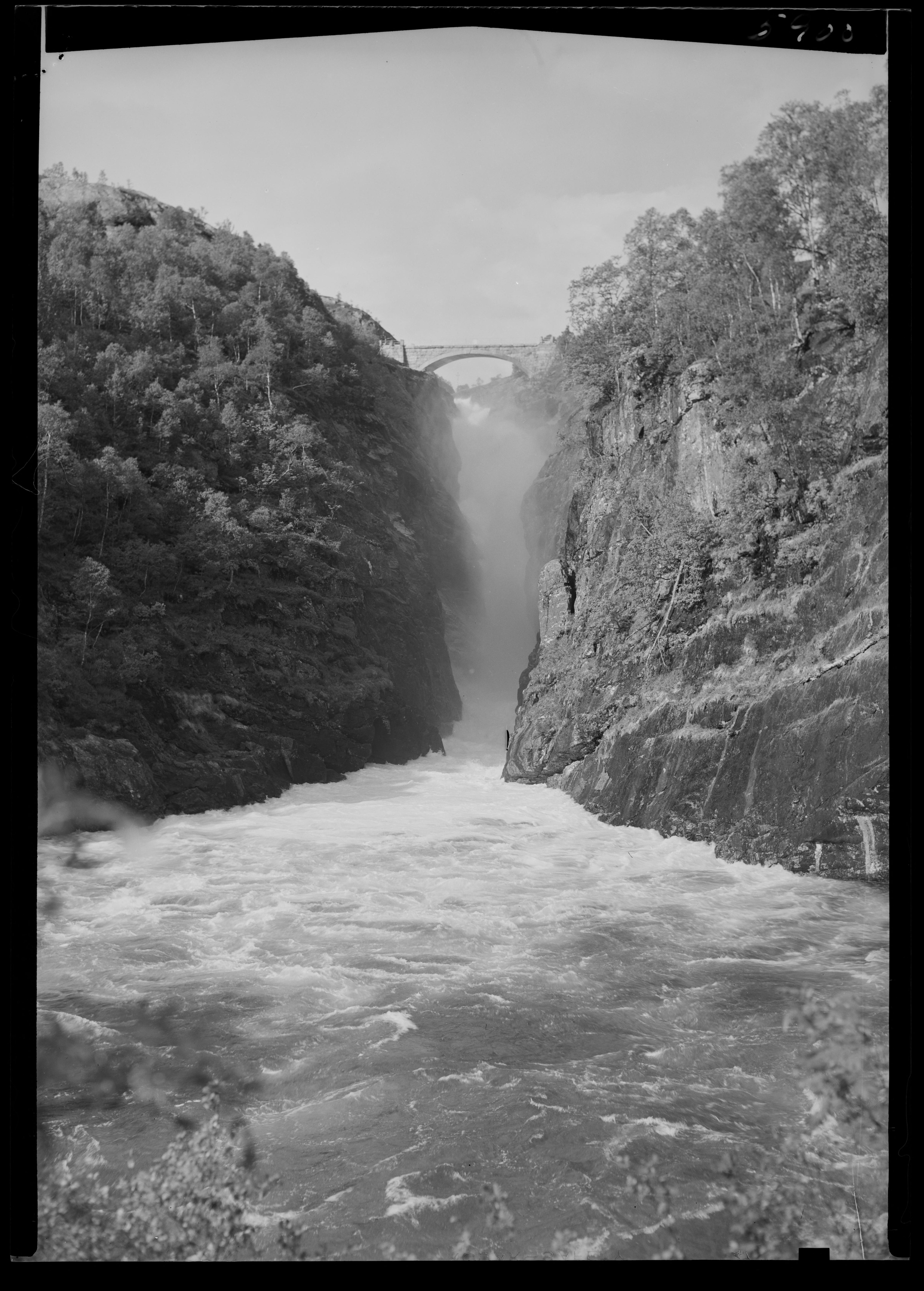
View of the Dorgefoss waterfall in Sirdal, circa 1948

The main source of income for Sirdal Municipality is the Sira-Kvina Power Company which gets its power from the big Sira and Kvina rivers. The waterfalls on the river Sira are utilized in four power stations owned by Sira-Kvina power company. The company also owns three power stations in the Kvina river system, hence the company's name. Total annual production is 6,000 gigawatt-hours (22,000 TJ), total installation is 1,760 megawatts (2,360,000 hp). The largest power station, Tonstad Hydroelectric Power Station, was inaugurated in 1968, with two units, each producing 160 megawatts (210,000 hp). The power station has now 4 units, each 160 MW, and one unit at 320 megawatts (430,000 hp), giving a total output of 960 megawatts (1,290,000 hp). Total annual production in this station is approximately 4,000 gigawatt-hours (14,000 TJ), which makes Tonstad the largest power station in Norway in terms of production. Sira-Kvina power company applied in 2007 for concession to expand the power station with two new units (reversible turbines), each containing 480 megawatts (640,000 hp), and the concession is pending.

The number of wind turbines is 51; in 2024, a political process for more wind turbines, was ended by a municipal council vote.

Tourism is also an important source of income for the Sirdal economy, taking advantage of the extensive mountains, mountainous plateaus, lakes, and great views. There are multiple alpine resorts and hotels in the valley, as well as cottages and camping spots. Winter activities include six ski resorts for winter enjoyment. Downhill ski areas include Tjørhomfjellet, Bjørnestad Ski Centre, Ålsheia Ski Centre, Fidjeland Ski Centre, and Ådneram Ski lift. Cross-country skiers can enjoy dozens of trails over spectacular terrain. Summer activities include hiking, horseback riding, and river rafting.

== History ==
From the oldest times the Sirdalen valley was divided by the river Sira with Rogaland county controlling the west side and Agder county controlling the east side. The two sides of the valley, however, was established as one single parish in Christian times, even though it crossed county lines, something that was not very common in Norway.

In 1837, it was decided that every parish should be a municipality, but no municipality should belong to more than one county (see formannskapsdistrikt law). Sirdal parish was therefore first divided in two municipalities. This was a bad decision because they had very few inhabitants separately. A new solution was found in 1839 when the two municipalities were re-joined, and the county border was moved so that all of Sirdalen was in Vest-Agder county.

At Kvæven, in northern Sirdal one finds the Sirdal Mountain Museum. This museum has a collection of old Sirdal buildings. Former lifestyles are visible in the farmhouse, a schoolhouse, stable, blacksmith's shop, barn, and mountain farm cottage as well as original equipment.

== Notable people ==
- Berit Kvæven (born 1942 in Øvre Sirdal), a sivilingeniør and politician
- Gunnar Tjomlid (born 1974), a skeptic, secular humanist, blogger, and author who was brought up in Sirdal
- Linda Grubben (born 1979), a World Cup biathlete
- Arild Haugen (born 1985 in Sirdal), a boxer and former strongman

== International relations ==
=== Twin towns — Sister cities ===
- Väike-Maarja Parish, Estonia (since 1994)
