= Lunde, Sirdal =

Village in Sirdal Municipality, Norway

Lunde Øvre Sirdal
- Village
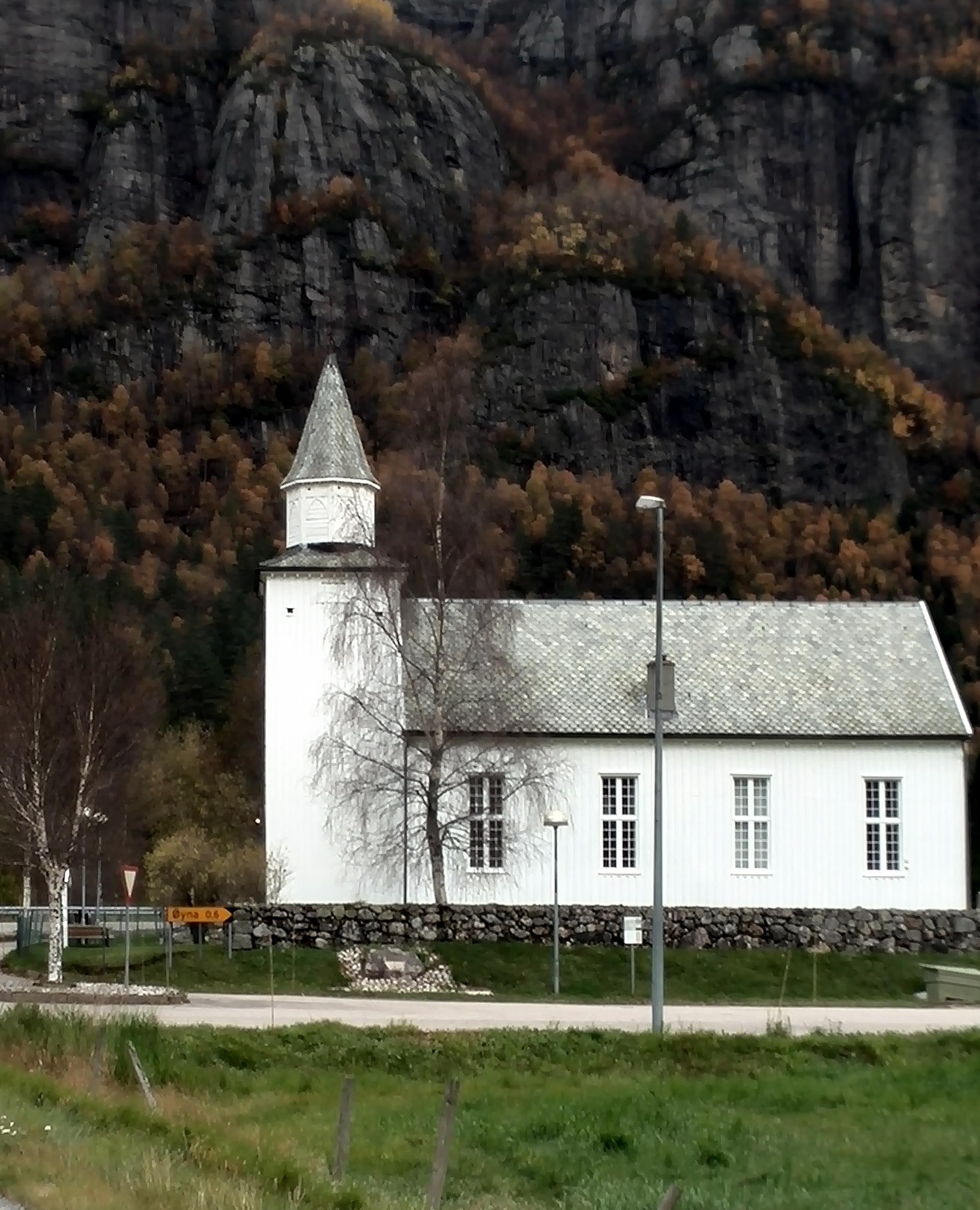
- View of the village church
- Interactive map of Lunde
- Coordinates: 58.80972°N 6.76328°E
- Country: Norway
- Region: Southern Norway
- County: Agder
- District: Lister
- Municipality: Sirdal Municipality
- Elevation: 259 m (850 ft)
- Time zone: UTC+01:00 (CET)
  - Summer (DST): UTC+02:00 (CEST)
- Post Code: 4440 Tonstad

Lunde is a small farming village in Sirdal Municipality in Agder county, Norway. The village is located along the river Sira in the upper part of the Sirdalen valley. Lunde Church is located in the village, just east of the bridge over the river.

The village is home to the German boarding school Outdoor College. It was founded by Maike and Günter Hoffmann and welcomed its first class of students, counting 23 adolescents, in August 2014. The school building is named Dr. Rolf Hoffmann Skole, after Günter Hoffmann's father who died a few months after the school's initial opening. Before the building was used as a local school for the surrounding villages, however, had been closed to for many years because of a decreasing number of students.

== History ==
The village was the administrative centre of the old Øvre Sirdal Municipality which existed from 1905 until its dissolution in 1960.
