= Tonstad Hydroelectric Power Station =

Tonstad Power Station
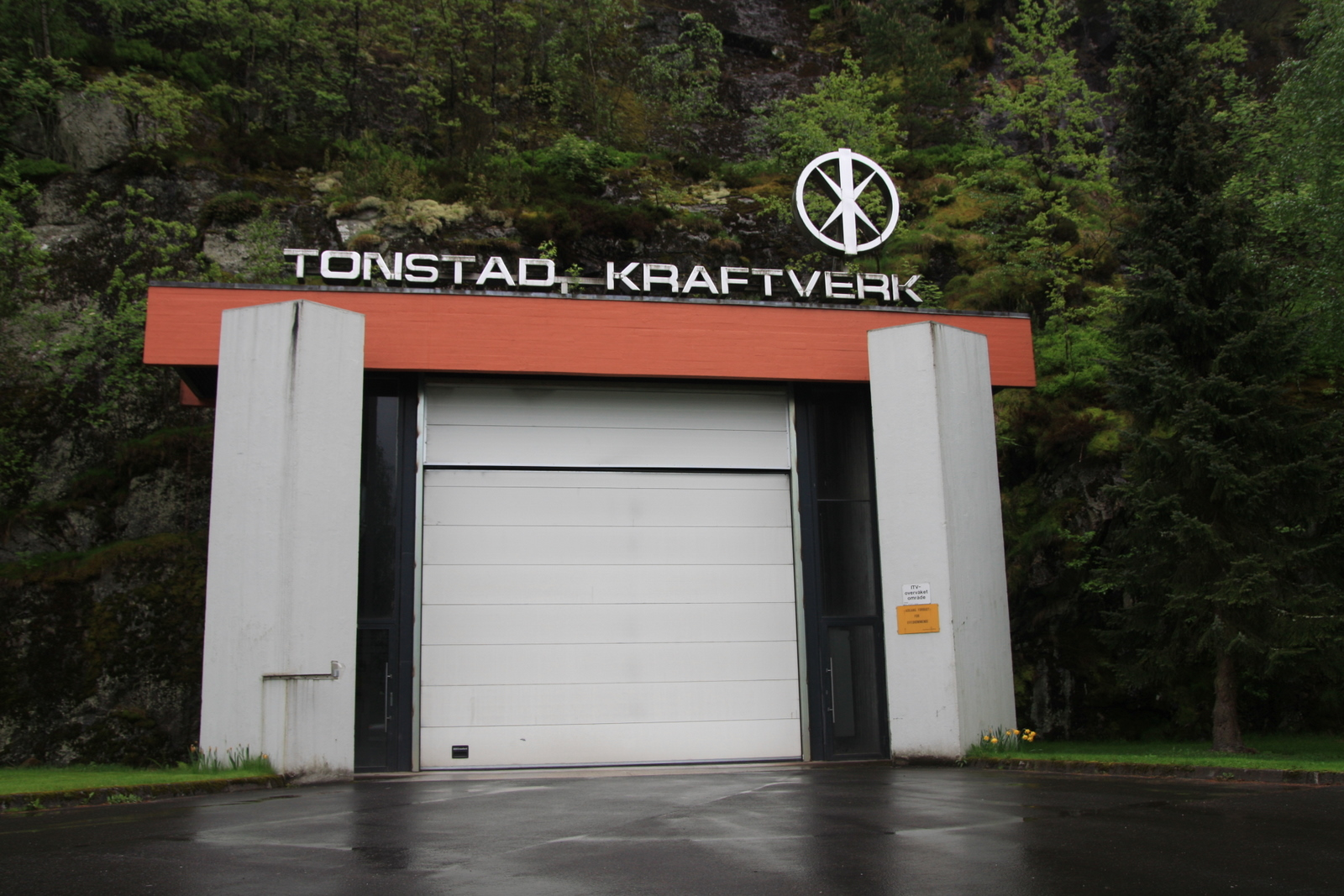
- Interactive map of Tonstad Power Station
- Official name: Tonstad kraftverk
- Country: Norway
- Location: Agder
- Coordinates: 58°39′33″N 6°43′01″E
- Status: Open
- Opening date: 1968; 58 years ago
- Owner: Sira-Kvina Kraftselskap

Reservoir
- Creates: Homstølvatnet (Kvinesdal)

Power Station
- Hydraulic head: 440 metres (1,440 ft)
- Turbines: 5
- Installed capacity: 960 MW
- Capacity factor: 45.2%
- Annual generation: 3800 GW·h

Tonstad Power Station (Norwegian: Tonstad kraftverk) is a hydroelectric power station located in Sirdal Municipality in Agder county, Norway. The station is in Tonstad, at the northern end of the lake Sirdalsvatnet.

It has a total installed capacity of 960 megawatts (1,290,000 hp), with 4 units each producing 160 megawatts (210,000 hp) and one unit at 320 megawatts (430,000 hp), all equipped with francis turbines. With an annual production of approximately 3,800 gigawatt-hours (14,000 TJ), it is the largest power station in Norway with respect to annual production (in 2006). It is near the landing point of the 1,400-megawatt (1,900,000 hp) NORD.LINK power cable to Germany.

The powerstation utilises the waterfalls in the Sira and the Kvina river system, with a total height of 440 metres (1,440 ft). An application for an expansion with an additional 960 megawatts (1,290,000 hp) (pumped storage) was sent in 2008. The application is still pending.
