= Tonstad Church =

Church in Agder, Norway

- Tonstad kirke
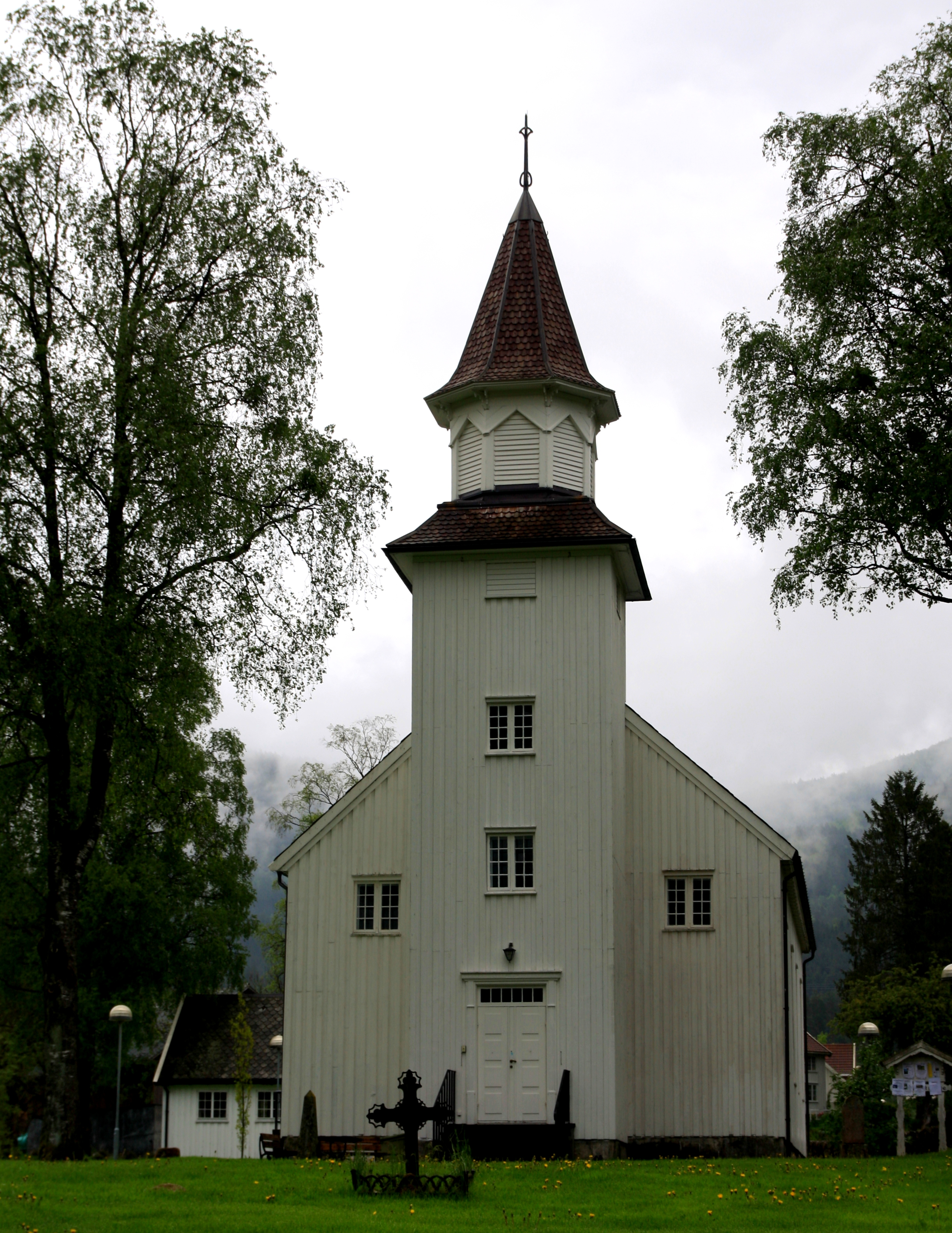
- View of the church
- Tonstad Church
- 58.667°N 6.71686°E
- Location: Sirdal Municipality, Agder
- Country: Norway
- Denomination: Church of Norway
- Churchmanship: Evangelical Lutheran

History
- Status: Parish church
- Founded: 12th century
- Consecrated: 7 Oct 1852

Architecture
- Functional status: Active
- Architect: Hans Linstow
- Architectural type: Long church
- Completed: 1852; 174 years ago

Specifications
- Capacity: 300
- Materials: Wood

Administration
- Diocese: Agder og Telemark
- Deanery: Lister og Mandal prosti
- Parish: Sirdal
- Norwegian Cultural Heritage Site
- Type: Church
- Status: Not protected
- ID: 85648

Tonstad Church (Norwegian: Tonstad kirke) is a parish church of the Church of Norway in the large Sirdal Municipality in Agder county, Norway. It is located in the village of Tonstad. It one of the four churches in the Sirdal parish which is part of the Lister og Mandal prosti (deanery) in the Diocese of Agder og Telemark. The white, wooden church was built in a long church design in 1852 using plans drawn up by the architect Hans Linstow. The church seats about 300 people.

== History ==
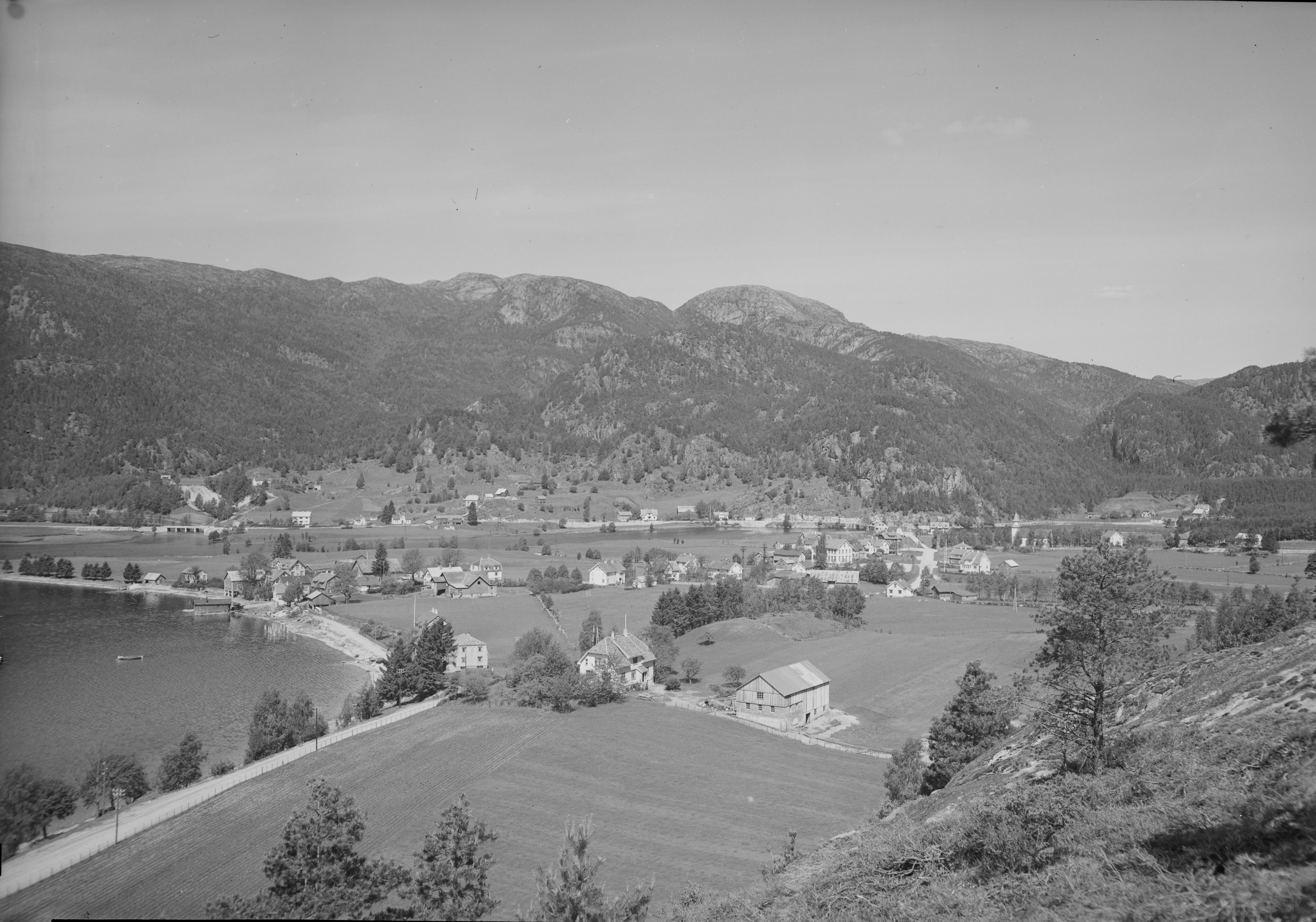
View of the church and village in 1948.

The earliest existing historical records of the church date back to the year 1461, but the first church here may have been built in the early 13th century. The first church here was likely a stave church and it was dedicated to St. Mary. In 1639, records show that a runic inscription about the Virgin Mary in the north tower was found and dated to around the year 1200, making it likely that the church was built before that time.

The old medieval church was probably torn down in the year 1625. That same year, a new timber-framed church was built on the same site. In 1852, that church was again replaced with a new church. The new church was built slightly beside the old church and it was consecrated on 7 October 1852 by the Bishop Jacob von der Lippe. The new church was rather unique in that it has a gallery that encircles the whole church room including above the sacristy in the choir.

== See also ==
- List of churches in Agder og Telemark
