= Sirdalsvatnet =

Lake in Flekkefjord, Norway

- Sirdalsvannet
- Interactive map of Sirdalsvatnet
- Location: Sirdal Municipality, Agder
- Coordinates: 58.56806°N 6.702°E
- Primary inflows: Sira
- Primary outflows: Sira
- Catchment area: Sira river basin
- Basin countries: Norway
- Max. length: 27 kilometres (17 mi)
- Max. width: 1 kilometre (0.62 mi)
- Surface area: 18.8 km^{2} (7.3 sq mi)
- Shore length^{1}: 59.91 kilometres (37.23 mi)
- Surface elevation: 52 metres (171 ft)
- References: NVE
- ^{1} Shore length is not a well-defined measure.

Sirdalsvatnet is a lake in Agder county, Norway. The 18.8-square-kilometre (7.3 sq mi) lake lies along the border of Sirdal Municipality and Flekkefjord Municipality. The lake is part of the river Sira and it stretches about 27 kilometres (17 mi), running from the village of Tonstad in the north to the village of Sira in the south. The lake is about 1 kilometre (0.62 mi) wide at its widest point.

== See also ==
- List of lakes in Norway
