= Tonstad =

Village in Sirdal Municipality, Norway

- Village
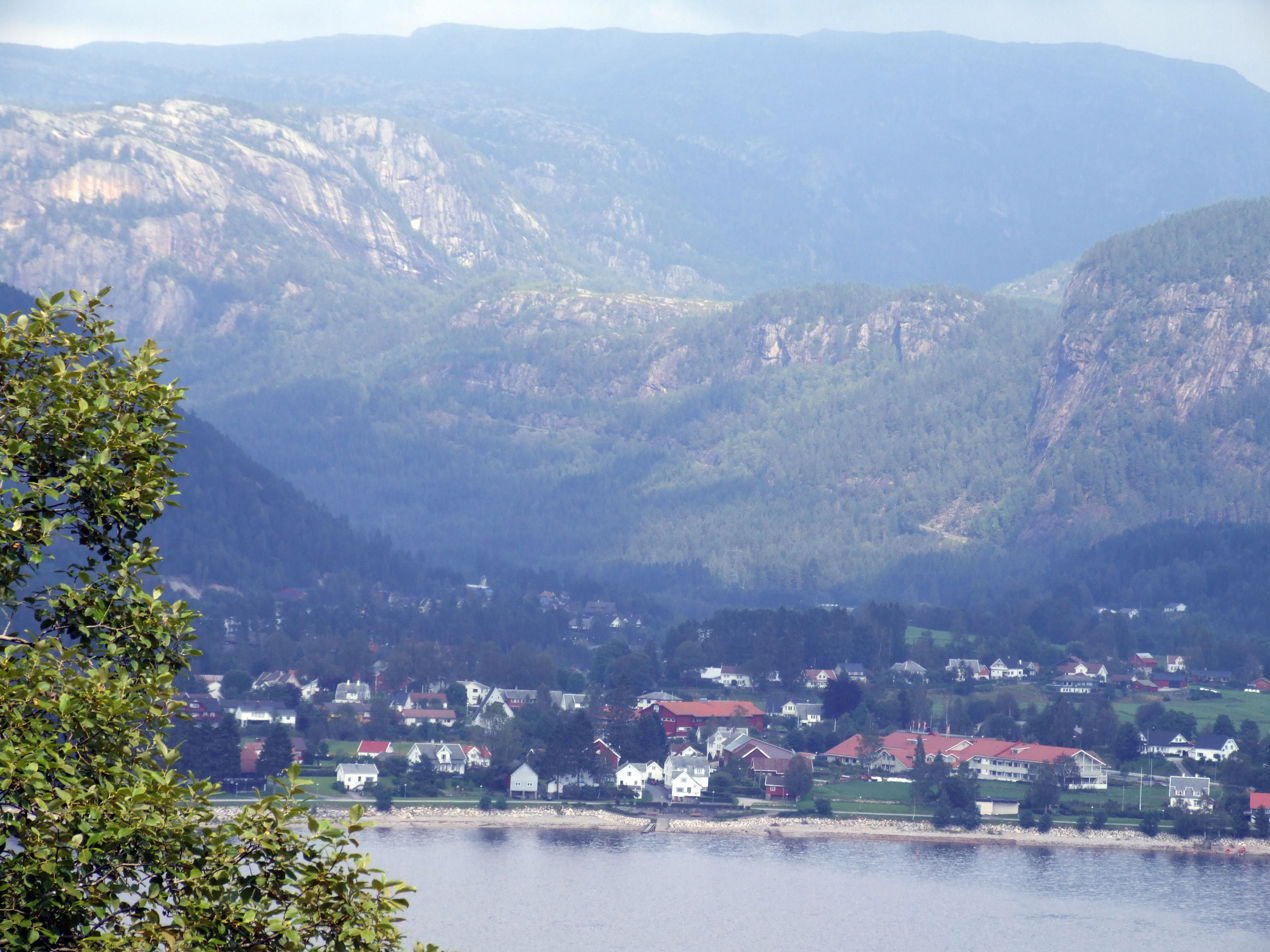
- View of the village
- Interactive map of Tonstad
- Coordinates: 58.66421°N 6.7165°E
- Country: Norway
- Region: Southern Norway
- County: Agder
- District: Lister
- Municipality: Sirdal Municipality

Area
  - Total: 1.29 km^{2} (0.50 sq mi)
- Elevation: 58 m (190 ft)

Population (2026)
  - Total: 939
  - Density: 728/km^{2} (1,890/sq mi)
- Time zone: UTC+01:00 (CET)
  - Summer (DST): UTC+02:00 (CEST)
- Post Code: 4440 Tonstad

Tonstad is the administrative centre of Sirdal Municipality in Agder county, Norway. The village is located at the northern end of the lake Sirdalsvatnet in the Sira river valley.

The 1.29-square-kilometre (320-acre) village has a population (2026) of 939 and a population density of 728 inhabitants per square kilometre (1,890/sq mi).

Tonstad Hydroelectric Power Station and the Tonstad ski center are both located in and around this village. The Tonstad Church is also located in the village.

== History ==
The village of Tonstad was the administrative center of the old Tonstad Municipality from 1905 until its dissolution in 1960. In 1960, it became the part of Sirdal Municipality, and it continued to be the administrative center of that new municipality.

=== Name ===
The municipality of Tonstad was named after the old Tonstad farm (Old Norse: Þornýjarstaðir), since the Tonstad Church is located there. The first element of the name comes from the female name Tone (Old Norse: Þorný) and the last element is the plural form of staðr which means "homestead" or "farm".
