= Sira (river) =

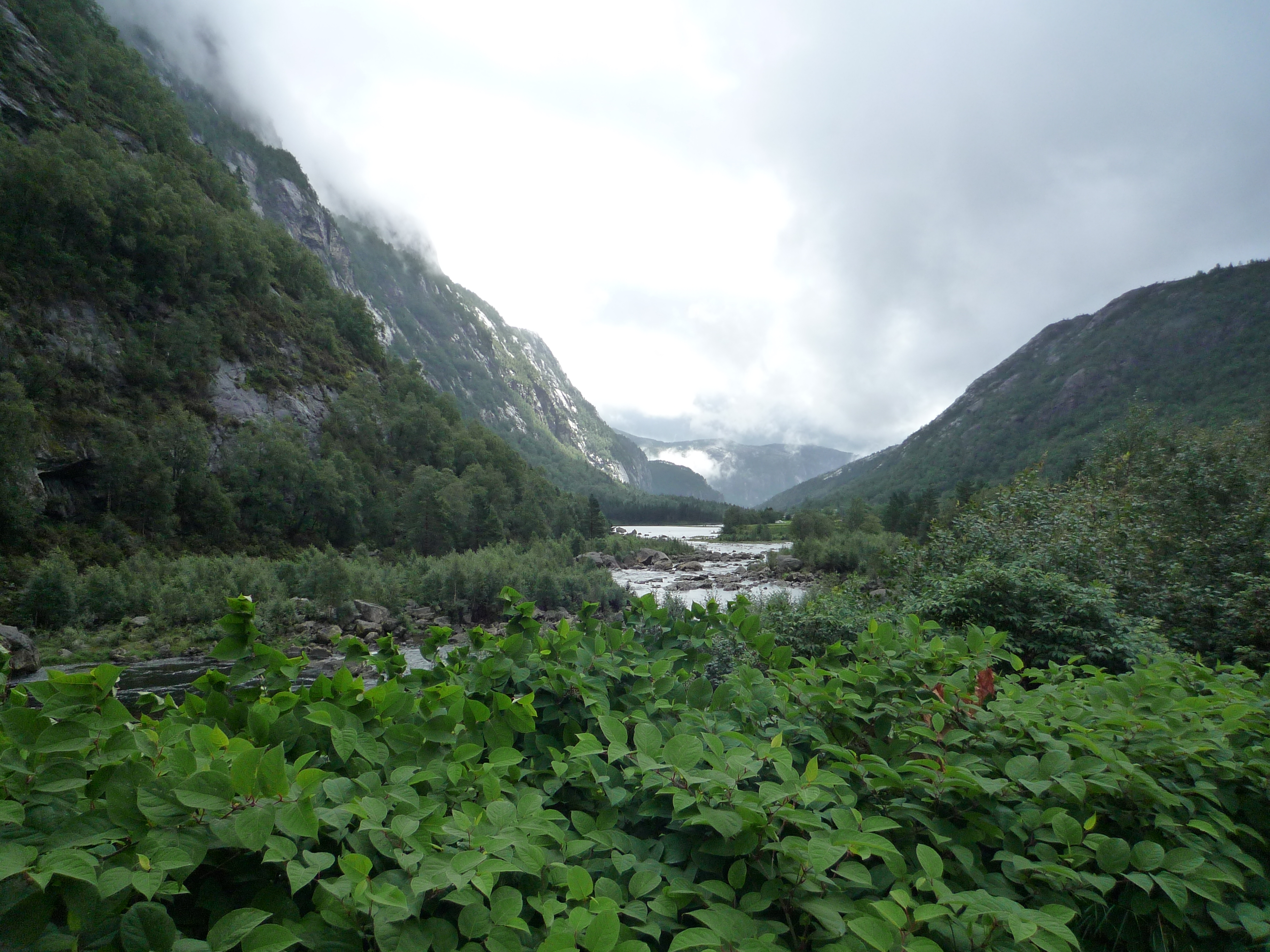
- View of the river near Tonstad

Location
- Country: Norway
- Counties: Agder/Rogaland
- Municipality: Flekkefjord, Sirdal, Sokndal, Lund

Physical characteristics
- Source: Sirdalsheiane, Ytre Storevatnet
  - location: Bykle Municipality, Agder, Norway
  - coordinates: 59°16′35″N 06°54′40″E
  - elevation: 1,000 m (3,300 ft)
- Mouth: Åna
  - location: Åna-Sira, Rogaland-Agder, Norway
  - coordinates: 58°17′32″N 06°26′24″E
  - elevation: 0 m (0 ft)
- Length: 152 km (94 mi)
- Basin size: 1,902.7 km^{2} (734.6 sq mi)
- Discharge
  - average: 130 m^{3}/s (4,600 cu ft/s)

Sira is a river in southwestern Norway. The 152-kilometre (94 mi) long river flows begins in the Sirdalsheiane mountains near the border of Agder and Rogaland counties. The headwaters of the river is the lake Ytre Storevatnet and it flows south through the Sirdalen valley in Sirdal Municipality and Flekkefjord Municipality. The river flows through the large lakes Sirdalsvatnet and Lundevatnet before heading south on the Agder/Rogaland county border. At the village of Åna-Sira the river empties into the Åna fjord. The river runs through several large villages such as Åna-Sira, Sira, Tonstad, Lunde, and Kvæven. The river drains the 1,902.7-square-kilometre (734.6 sq mi) watershed. The Tonstad Hydroelectric Power Station is powered by water from the waterfalls along this river.

== Media gallery ==
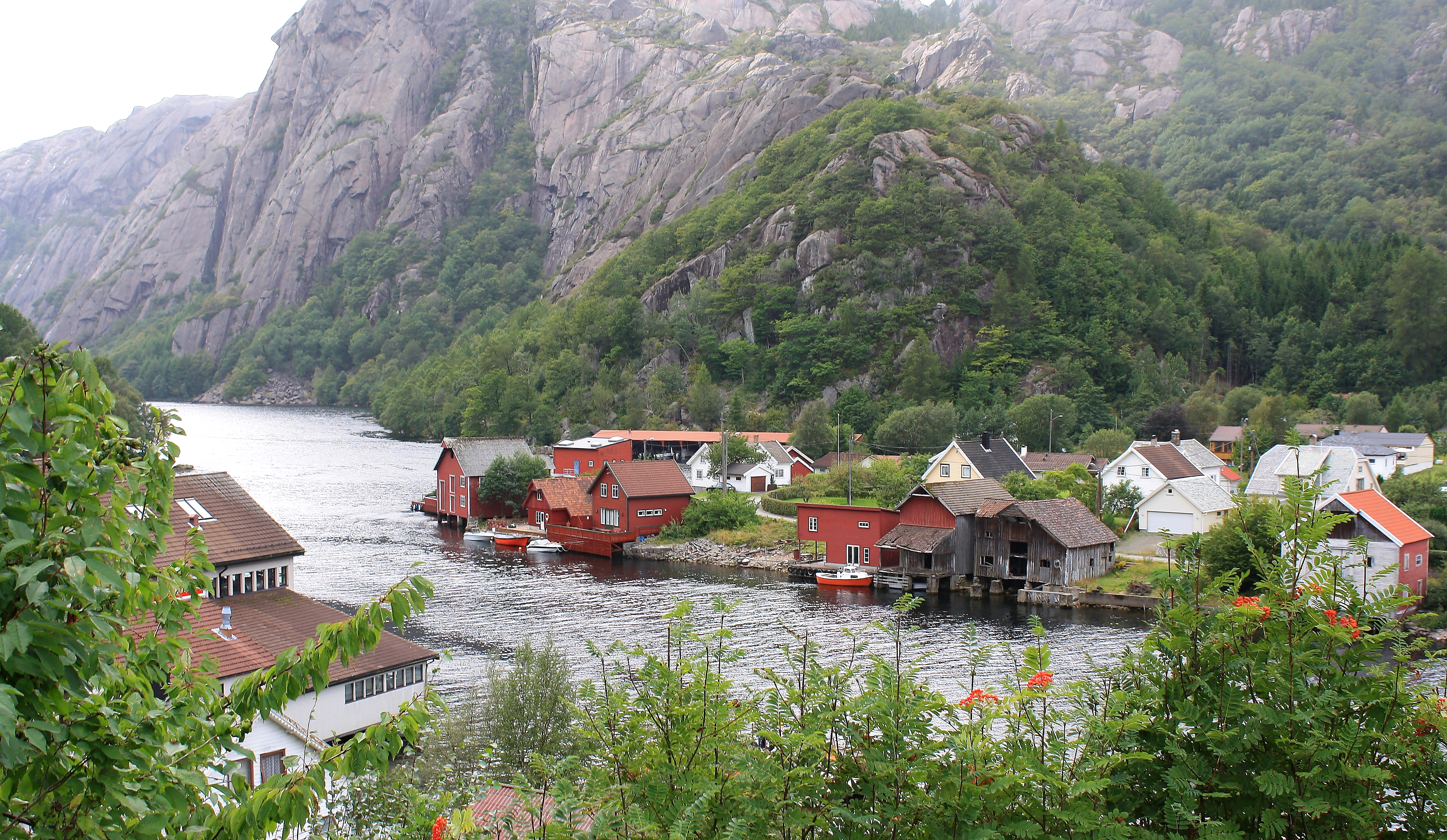
View at Åna-Sira

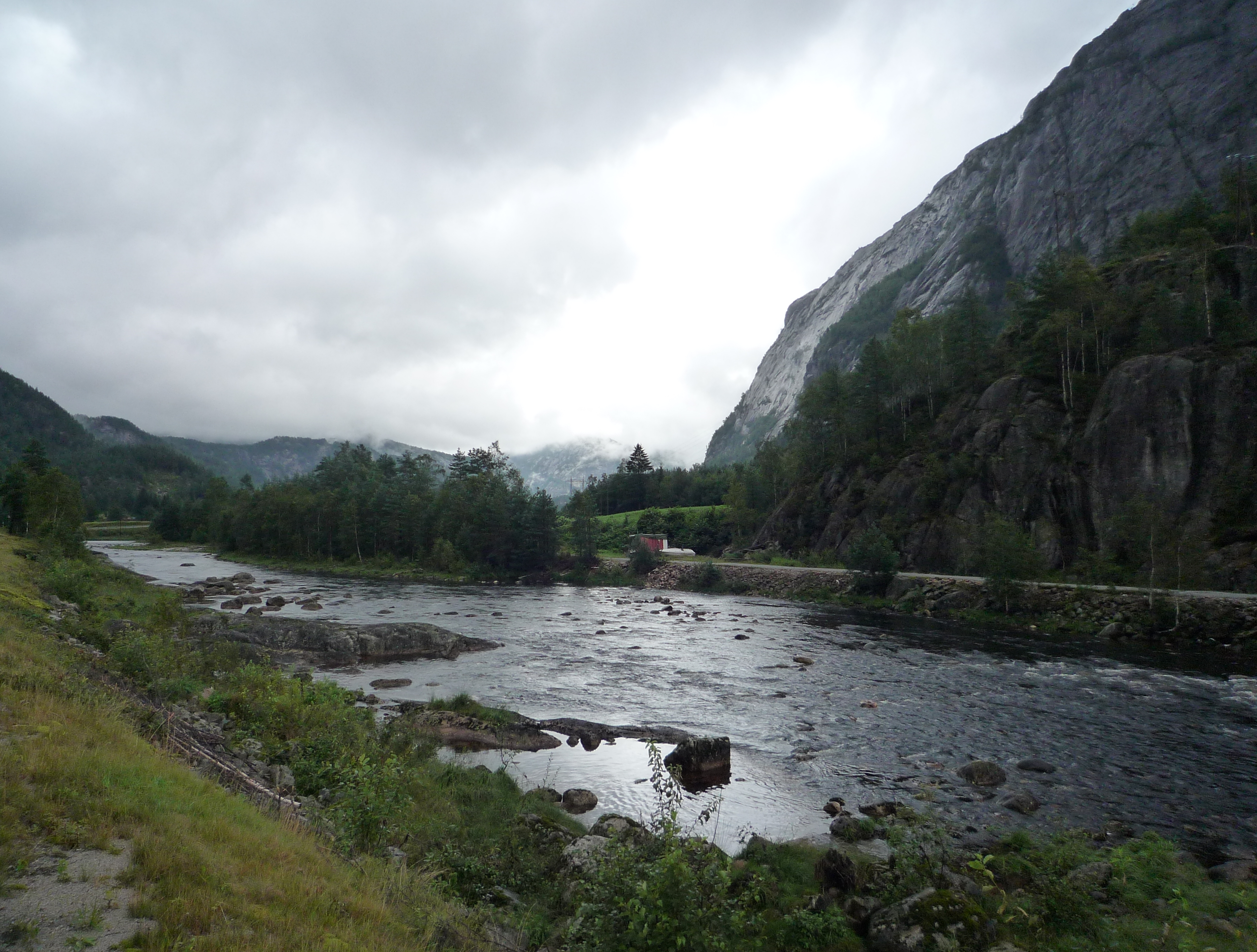
View near Tonstad

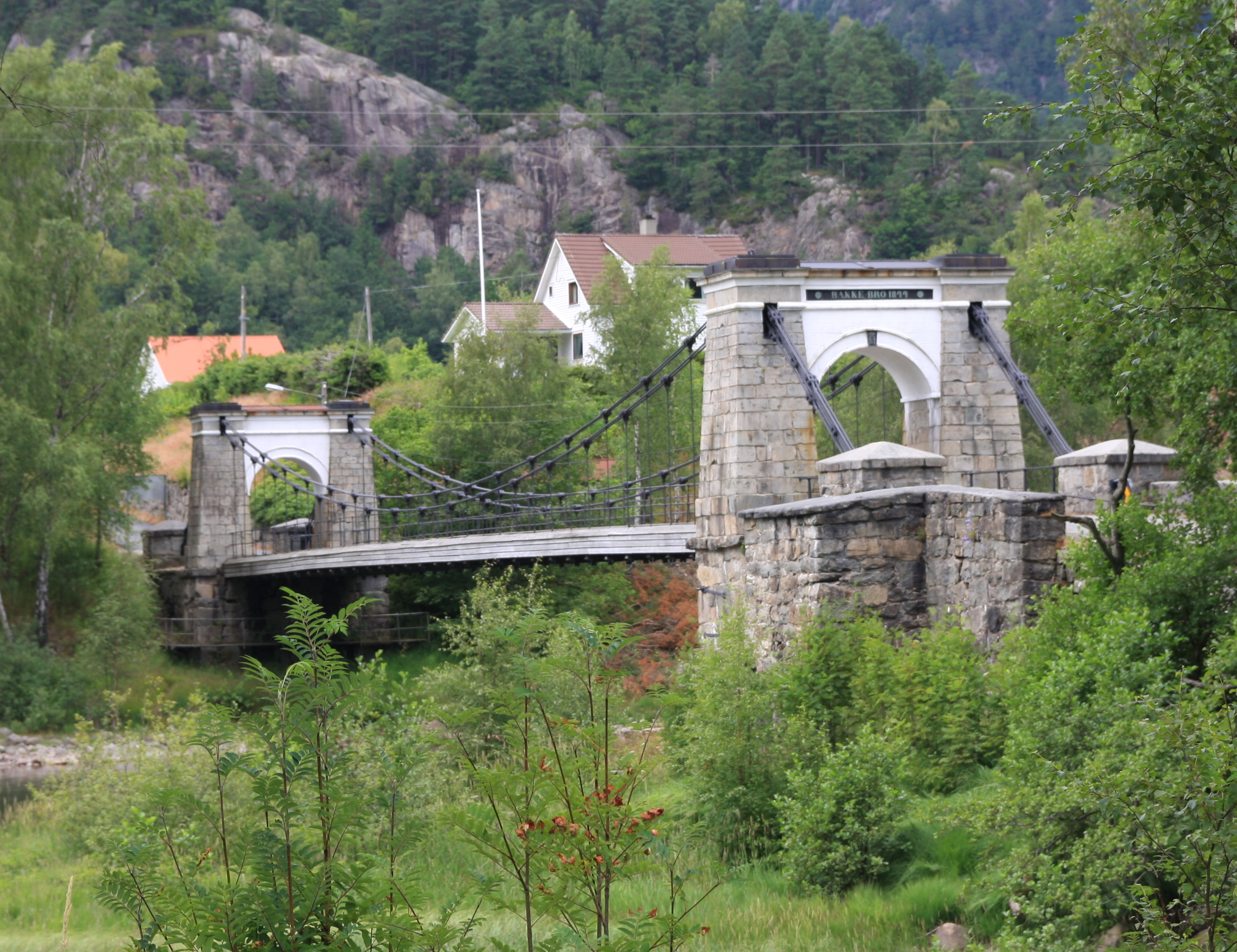
Bakke bridge over the river

== See also ==
- List of rivers in Norway
