= Nils Fuglesang =

Norwegian pilot

Nils Jørgen Fuglesang
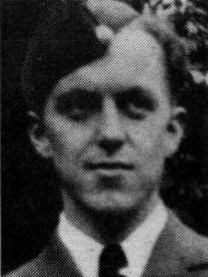
- Born: 7 October 1918; Hidra, Hidra Municipality, Norway
- Died: 29 March 1944 (aged 25); Rote Hahn near Kiel, Germany
- Military career
- Allegiance: Norway
- Service years: 1941–1944
- Rank: Lieutenant, Pilot Officer
- Service number: 742
- Unit: No. 332 Squadron RAF
- Conflicts: World War II: Channel Front (POW)
- Awards: King Haakon VII Freedom Medal, Mentioned in Despatches

Nils Jørgen Fuglesang (7 October 1918 – 29 March 1944), was a Norwegian Supermarine Spitfire pilot who was taken prisoner during the Second World War. He is notable for the part he took in the 'Great Escape' from Stalag Luft III in March 1944 and as one of the men re-captured and subsequently shot by the Gestapo.

== Pre-war life ==
Fuglesang was born in the village of Rasvåg on the island of Hidra, near the town of Flekkefjord in Norway the son of a customs official he was raised and educated in Florø. German prisoner of war records confirm his residency in Florø but do not give any details of his date and place of birth. From September 1935 Fuglesang received three years education in economics at the French Lycee Pierre-Corneille in Rouen before studying at the Bergen Commercial College. He was working as an apprentice with an Oslo shipping company when the war began. Following the German invasion in April 1940 and the ensuing battles the country was occupied. Fuglesang decided to escape from Norway to get to Great Britain and join the Norwegian Armed Forces in exile. Sea traffic was closely monitored by the Germans who were aware of significant numbers of young Norwegians wishing to continue the fight from England, frequent checks and searches were made and penalties harsh for anybody caught. On 12 March 1941 he escaped from Kyammen to Shetland aboard the boat Heimfjell with 11 others.

== War service ==
Fuglesang enlisted in the Norwegian Army Air Service with service number 742 and sailed in May to Canada to train at Little Norway, the exiled Norwegian forces camp at Toronto Island Airport. He completed basic training and learned more English language then completing flight training. He was awarded his aircrew brevet pilots wings and promoted sergeant towards the end of 1941. His instructors recommended that had the aptitude to become a fighter pilot during which he was promoted to lieutenant. After further training Fuglesang sailed for England where he joined Operational Training Unit and began to fly Supermarine Spitfire aircraft. On 9 June 1942 he joined No. 332 Squadron RAF a squadron manned by Norwegian personnel flying Supermarine Spitfire. at RAF North Weald flying operationally with the fighter wing commanded by wing commander Don Finlay which operated from that base. He flew on fighter sweep and bomber escort missions over the English Channel to occupied France and the Netherlands. In action on 20 January 1943 he attacked a German Fw 190 fighter over the French coast, this was assessed as probably destroyed. His reputation as a reliable and steady pilot resulted in him being awarded the Norwegian King Haakon VII Freedom Medal and a promotion to pilot officer in March 1943.

== Prisoner of war ==
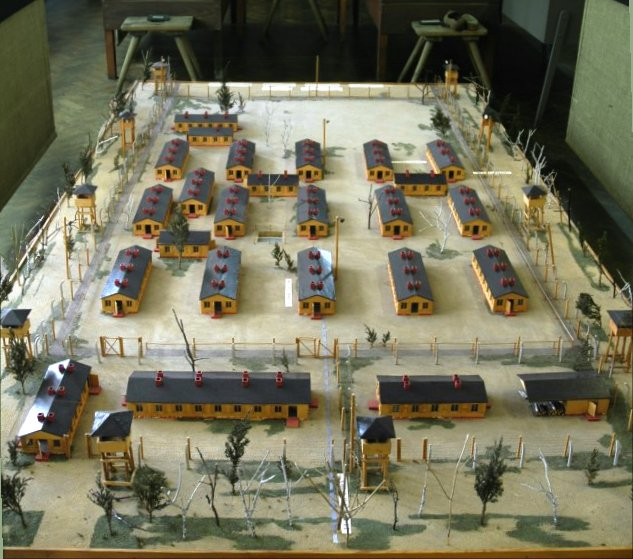
Model of Stalag Luft III prison camp.

At 1905 hours on 2 May 1943 Nils Jørgen Fuglesang was flying Supermarine Spitfire Mark IX (serial number “BS540” squadron codes “AH-E”) on a Ramrod mission with North Weald wing over south west Holland. His squadron were in action with Luftwaffe Focke Wulf Fw 190 fighters and as wingman he stuck to the tail of his lead pilot until a burst of 20mm cannon fire intended for the lead aircraft hit his own aircraft. Fuglesang crash landed in Zeeland, the SW part of Holland and was taken prisoner by German infantrymen training close by. Photograph of his crashed aircraft is in Norman Franks' book RAF Fighter Command Losses. He became prisoner of war No. 1264 held at Stalag Luft III in the province of Lower Silesia near the town of Sagan (now Żagań in Poland).

== 'Great Escape' ==
Fuglesang was an enthusiastic member of the tunneling crew participating in regular shifts to lengthen and shore up the tunnel, he and fellow Norwegian Halldor Espelid were near the front of the list of men escaping and they had cleared the tunnel exit by 2230 hours. He was one of the 76 men who escaped the prison camp on the night of 24–25 March 1944 in the escape now famous as "the Great Escape". He teamed up with fellow Free Norwegian Halldor Espelid, James Catanach an Australian who was fluent in German and spoke Norwegian and the New Zealander of Danish ancestry Arnold George Christensen in a group heading for Denmark and possibly ultimately neutral Sweden. Fuglesang and his team reached Berlin as they were seen there by other escapers before they changed trains to Hamburg which they also reached successfully only to be caught on the next leg of their rail journey from Hamburg to the naval town of Flensburg on the Danish border. Nearing the Danish border on 26 March 1944 a suspicious policemen insisted on carefully examining their papers and checking their briefcases which contained newspapers and escape rations. Close inspection of their clothing revealed they were wearing altered greatcoats. Although the four escapees had split up to pretend to be travelling individually they were all in the same railway carriage, more policemen arrived and closely examined every passenger, soon arresting all four suspects. An alternative version states that the two Norwegians were arrested on the Marienhelzungsweg and Catanach and Christensen on the Helm. The escapers were taken to Flensburg prison. The four men were handed over to the Kiel Gestapo and after interrogation were told that they would be taken by road back to prison camp.

On 29 March 1944 two black sedan cars arrived, James Catanach was taken in the first car with three Gestapo agents including SS-Sturmbannfuhrer Johannes Post a senior officer based there. Post had his driver stop the car in the countryside outside Kiel about 1630 hours and called James Catanach out into a field where he promptly shot him. The second car drew up in the same place shortly afterwards and Post told his agents to get the hand-cuffed Arnold George Christensen, Halldor Espelid and Nils Fuglesang out, stating that they should take a break before their long drive. As the airmen walked into the field they almost stumbled over Catanach's body as they were also shot. The four men were cremated at Kiel under Gestapo supervision.

Fuglesang was one of the 50 escapers who had been listed by SS-Gruppenfuhrer Arthur Nebe to be killed so was amongst the unfortunate executed and murdered by the Gestapo. Originally his remains were buried at Sagan, but his cremation urn was removed to Kirkehavn Hidra near Flekkefjord, Norway for his family.

The Norwegians Nils Fuglesang and Halldor Espelid were on the list of officers named in the British press on 20 May 1944 as having been killed.

Memorial to "The Fifty" down the road toward Żagań (Espelid at left)

== Awards ==
- King Haakon VII Freedom Medal awarded March 1943 for significant service to Norway during the Second World War.
- Mention in Despatches by the Royal Air Force for his actions in captivity, as none of the other relevant decorations then available could be awarded posthumously. It was not published in the supplement to the London Gazette on 8 June 1944 when the British and Commonwealth personnel were honoured for fear of reprisals against his family in German-occupied Norway.

== Other victims ==
The Gestapo executed a group of 50 of the recaptured prisoners representing almost all of the nationalities involved in the escape. Post-war investigations saw a number of those guilty of the murders tracked down, arrested and tried for their crimes.

Nationalities of the 50 executed
(United Kingdom) 21 British
(Canada) 6 Canadian
(Poland) 6 Polish
(Australia) 5 Australian
(South Africa) 3 South African
(New Zealand) 2 New Zealanders
(Norway) 2 Norwegian
(Belgium) 1 Belgian
(Czechoslovakia) 1 Czechoslovak
(France) 1 Frenchman
(Greece) 1 Greek
(Lithuania) 1 Lithuanian
