= Nes og Hidra Municipality =

Former municipality in Vest-Agder, Norway

Nes og Hitterø Municipality Nes og Hitterø herred Hitterø og Nes herred Nes og Hidra Municipality (modern spelling)
- Former municipality
- Flekkefjord landdistrikt (historic name)
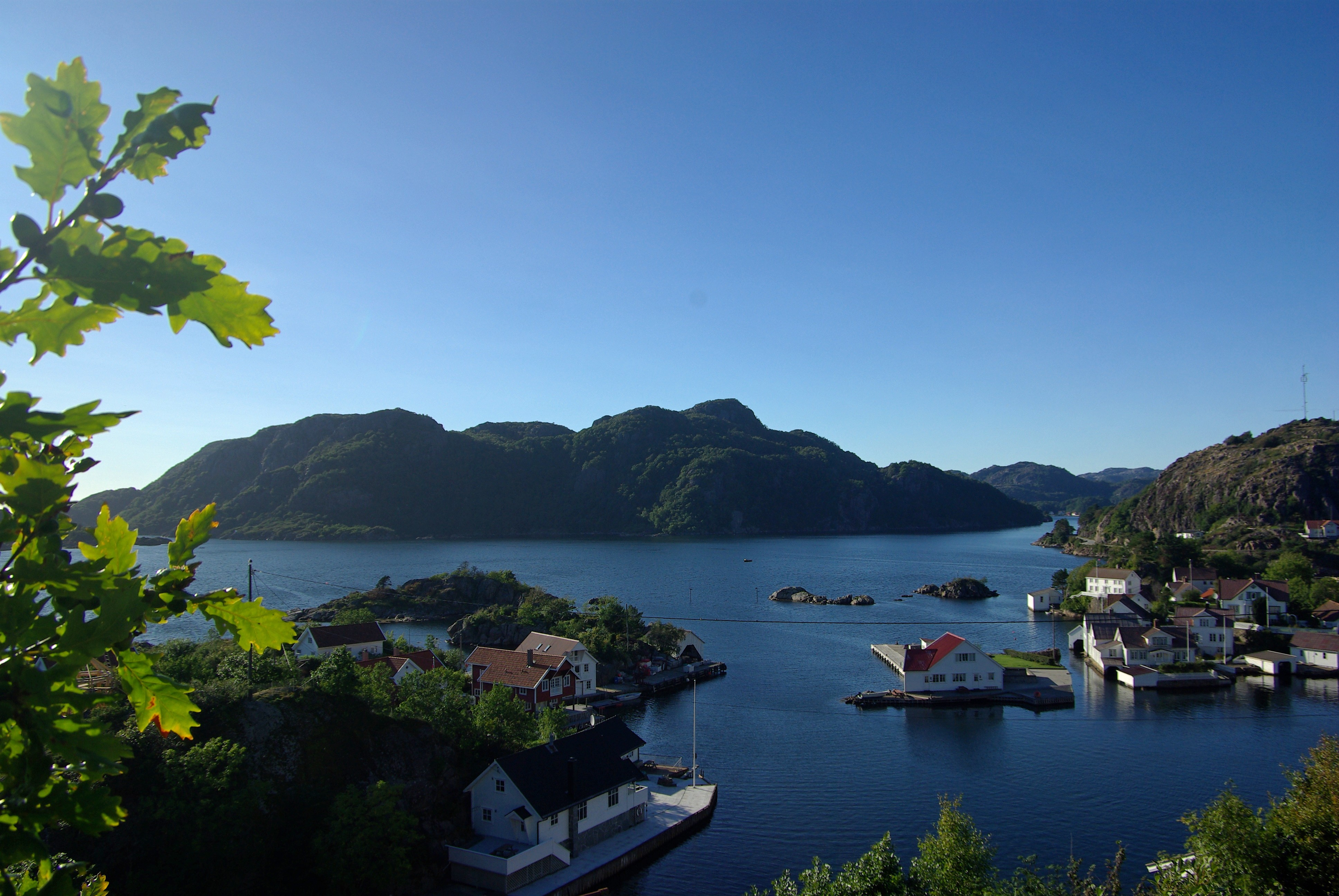
- View on Hidra

- Vest-Agder within Norway

- Nes og Hitterø within Vest-Agder
- Coordinates: 58°13′28″N 06°34′43″E
- Country: Norway
- County: Vest-Agder
- District: Lister
- Established: 1 Jan 1838
  - Created as: Formannskapsdistrikt
- Disestablished: 8 Oct 1893
  - Succeeded by: Nes Municipality and Hitterø Municipality
- Administrative centre: Nes

Area (upon dissolution)
  - Total: 237.8 km^{2} (91.8 sq mi)
- Highest elevation: 453 m (1,486 ft)

Population (1893)
  - Total: 3,779
  - Density: 15.89/km^{2} (41.16/sq mi)
- Demonym: Nessokning
- Time zone: UTC+01:00 (CET)
  - Summer (DST): UTC+02:00 (CEST)
- ISO 3166 code: NO-1042

Nes og Hitterø or Hitterø og Nes is a former municipality in the old Vest-Agder county, Norway. The 237.8-square-kilometre (91.8 sq mi) municipality existed from 1838 until its dissolution in 1893. The area is now part of Flekkefjord Municipality in the traditional district of Lister in Agder county. The administrative centre of the municipality was the small village of Sunde in Nes parish, located just outside the town of Flekkefjord (which was its own separate municipality).

== General information ==
The municipality of Flekkefjord landdistrikt was established on 1 January 1838 (see formannskapsdistrikt law). According to the 1835 census, the municipality had a population of 3,155. The name was changed to Nes og Hitterø Municipality in 1864 (it was also written as Hitterø og Nes Municipality). On 8 October 1893, Nes og Hitterø Municipality was divided to create two new municipalities: Nes Municipality (population: 1,704) in the north and Hitterø Municipality (population: 2,075) in the south. These two municipalities were later merged into Flekkefjord Municipality during the 1960s.

=== Name ===
The municipality (originally the parish) was originally named Flekkefjord landdistrikt since it was the rural area surrounding the town of Flekkefjord. In 1864, the municipal name was changed to Nes og Hitterø, a compound name literally meaning "Nes and Hitterø". Records show that the name compound name was also sometimes reversed to Hitterø og Nes. After the municipality was dissolved, the name Hitterø was modernized to Hidra in 1917. Since then, the former municipality is sometimes referred to as Nes og Hidra, using the updated name (even though it was never called this during its existence).

The parish of Nes is named after the old Nes farm (Old Norse: Nes) since the first local church (now called Flekkefjord Church) was built at that location. The name is identical to the word nes which means "peninsula", since the farm is located on a peninsula.

The parish of Hitterø is named after the island of Hidra (Old Norse: Hitrar) since the first Hidra Church was built there. The name is the plural form of hitr which means "split" or "cleft" (referring to the fact that the island is almost split in two by the Rasvåg fjord).

=== Churches ===
The Church of Norway had one parish (sokn) within Nes og Hitterø Municipality. At the time of the municipal dissolution, it was part of the Flekkefjord prestegjeld and the Flekkefjord prosti (deanery) in the Diocese of Agder.

Churches in Nes og Hitterø Municipality
Parish (sokn)	Church name	Location of the church	Year built
Hidra	Hidra Church	Kirkehamn	1854
Nes	Flekkefjord Church	Flekkefjord	1859

== Geography ==
The municipality encompassed the Nes peninsula and the island of Hidra (formerly called Hitterø). The highest point in the municipality was the 453-metre (1,486 ft) tall mountain Solandsvarden.

== Government ==
While it existed, Nes og Hitterø Municipality was governed by a municipal council of directly elected representatives. The mayor was indirectly elected by a vote of the municipal council. The municipality was under the jurisdiction of the Flekkefjord District Court and the Agder Court of Appeal.

=== Mayors ===
The mayor (Norwegian: ordfører) of Nes og Hitterø Municipality was the political leader of the municipality and the chairperson of the municipal council. The following people have held this position:

- 1838–1843: Kristian Tønnessen Omland
- 1844–1847: Jakob T. Olsen Allestad
- 1848–1849: Axel Sveiga
- 1850–1853: Knud Johnsen Vaage
- 1854–1855: Asser Ueland
- 1856–1857: Torjus Nilsen Sveiga
- 1858–1861: Hans Birkeland
- 1862–1869: Ole Daastøl
- 1870–1871: Søren Korneliussen Tjersland
- 1872–1873: Gjert Sand
- 1874–1876: Søren Korneliussen Tjersland
- 1876–1877: Ole Sivertsen Kirkehavn
- 1878–1879: Johannes Jensen Loge
- 1880–1881: Ole Sivertsen Kirkehavn
- 1882–1883: Tobias D. Tjørsvaag
- 1884–1887: Adolf S. Jacobsen
- 1888–1891: Ole Fuglestvedt
- 1892–1893: Johannes Jensen Loge

== See also ==
- List of former municipalities of Norway
