= Hidra =

Hidra may refer to:

== Places ==
- Hidra, Tunisia, a municipality in the Kasserine Governorate, Tunisia
- Hidra Municipality, a former municipality in Vest-Agder county, Norway
- Hidra (island), an island in Flekkefjord municipality in Agder county, Norway
- Hidra Church, a church in Flekkefjord municipality in Agder county, Norway

== Other meanings ==
- Hybrid Illinois Device for Research and Applications (HIDRA), a toroidal fusion device at the University of Illinois Urbana-Champaign
- NRP Hidra (H), a Portuguese Navy submarine in commission from 1917 to 1936

== See also ==
- Hitra (disambiguation)
- Hydra (disambiguation)
