= Espelid =

Espelid is a Norwegian surname. Notable people with the surname include:

- Halldor Espelid (1920–1944), Norwegian pilot
- Ingrid Espelid Hovig (1924–2018), Norwegian television chef and author of cook books
- Mons Espelid (1926–2009), Norwegian politician and dentist
