= Polycrase =

Uranium-yttrium oxide mineral

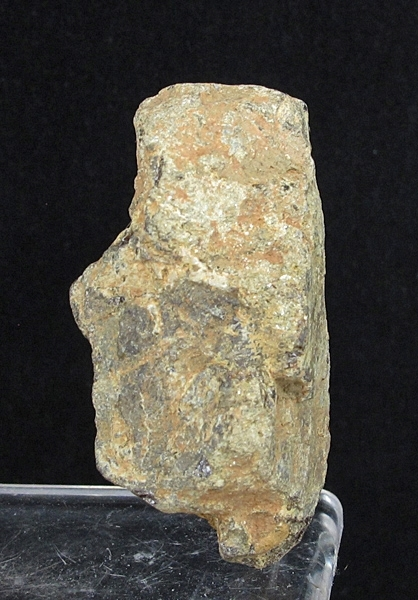
- Polycrase crystal from Rio Pomba, Minas Gerais, Brazil

General
- Category: Minerals
- Formula: (Y,Ca,Ce,U,Th)(Ti,Nb,Ta)_{2}O_{6}
- IMA symbol: Plc

Identification
- Mohs scale hardness: 5-6
- Specific gravity: 5
- Other characteristics: Radioactive

Polycrase or polycrase-(Y) is a black or brown metallic complex uranium yttrium oxide mineral with the chemical formula (Y,Ca,Ce,U,Th)(Ti,Nb,Ta)_{2}O_{6}. It is amorphous. It has a Mohs hardness of 5 to 6 and a specific gravity of 5. It is radioactive due to its uranium content (around 6%). It occurs in granitic pegmatites.

Polycrase forms a continuous series with the niobium rich rare earth oxide euxenite.

It was first described in 1870 at Rasvåg on the island of Hidra, south of the town of Flekkefjord, Norway. It is found in Sweden, Norway, and the United States.
