= Halldor Espelid =

Norwegian aviator (1920–1944)

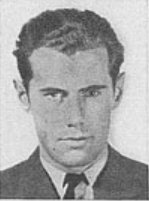
- Born: Halldor Espelid; 6 October 1920; Askøy Municipality, Norway
- Died: 29 March 1944 (aged 23) near Kiel, Germany
- Burial place: Poznan Old Garrison Cemetery, Poland
- Military career
- Allegiance: Norway
- Branch: Norwegian Army Air Service
- Service years: 1940–44
- Rank: Lieutenant
- Service number: 378
- Unit: No. 331 Squadron RAF
- Conflicts: World War II: Channel Front (POW)
- Awards: Mentioned in despatches

Halldor Espelid (6 October 1920 – 29 March 1944), known as "Harold" was a Norwegian Supermarine Spitfire pilot who was taken prisoner during the Second World War. He is notable for the part he took in the 'Great Escape' from Stalag Luft III in March 1944 and as one of the men re-captured and subsequently shot by the Gestapo.

== Pre-war life ==
Espelid was born in Askøy Municipality, Norway. He was the older brother of Norwegian politician Mons Espelid (1926–2009) and Ingrid Espelid Hovig. German prisoner of war records state that his first name was Harold and that he was born in Bergen. After leaving Bergen Cathedral School, to which he travelled by ferry every day, he started to train as a commercial driver. Following the German invasion in April 1940 and the ensuing battles of the Norwegian Campaign the country was occupied. Espelid decided to escape from Norway to get to Great Britain and join the Norwegian Armed Forces in exile. Sea traffic was closely monitored by the Germans who were aware of significant numbers of young Norwegians wishing to continue the fight from the United Kingdom, frequent checks and searches were made and penalties harsh for anybody caught. On 16 September 1940, he joined the 222-ton coastal vessel Traust as it made its fourth secret trip to Shetland. He arrived safely and was de-briefed for any information of intelligence value.

== War service ==
Espelid enlisted in the Norwegian Army Air Service with service number 110378 and sailed at about Christmas 1940 to Canada to train at Little Norway, the Norwegian Armed Forces in exile camp at Toronto Island Airport. He completed basic training and learned more English language then completing flight training. On 21 November 1941, Espelid was awarded his aircrew brevet pilots wings as shown in a portrait and was promoted sergeant. His instructors recommended that he had the aptitude to become a fighter pilot. After further training Espelid sailed for England where he joined an Operational Training Unit and began to fly Supermarine Spitfire aircraft.

On 15 July 1942, he joined No. 331 Squadron RAF, a squadron manned by Norwegian personnel flying Spitfires. The squadron had moved from Catterick to RAF North Weald in May 1942 to fly operationally with the fighter wing commanded by Wing Commander Don Finlay, which operated from that base. He flew missions over the English Channel to occupied France and covering the amphibious landings during the Dieppe Raid in August 1942 where the squadron was involved in significant air fighting, particularly over Dieppe.

== Prisoner of war ==
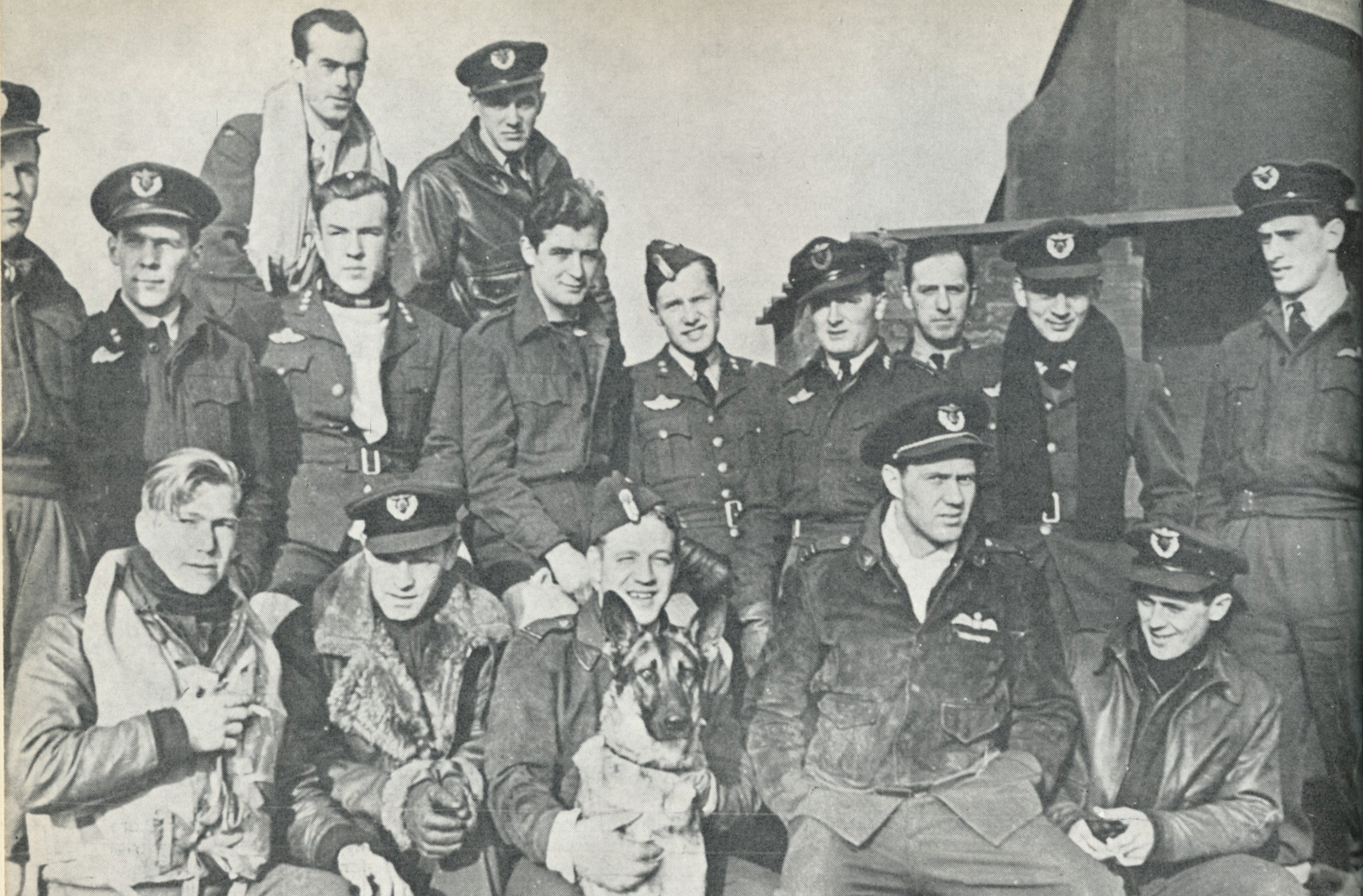
Norwegian fighter pilots of No. 331 Squadron RAF

On 27 August 1942, Espelid took part in a mission over Occupied France flying Supermarine Spitfire Mark Vb (serial number "BL588", squadron codes "FN – A"). He failed to return from the mission after his aircraft was damaged by anti-aircraft fire and had to crashland east of Dunkirk. A fellow pilot (Bjørn Ræder) stated that "he was seen to be hit by anti-aircraft fire at 20,000 feet and his Spitfire plunged out of formation. A little later he comes back only to break out again and continue over France. The radio must have been shot to pieces and control was lost". He was captured and reportedly spent a short period at Oflag XXI-B Schubin before becoming prisoner of war No. 643 held at Stalag Luft III in the province of Lower Silesia near the town of Sagan (now Żagań in Poland). During his time in captivity he was possibly promoted lieutenant, Norwegian Army Air Service; this rank is also shown in German records as pilot officer although the North Weald memorial and his headstone show the rank of sergeant. His rank is also given as sergeant when he was named in the British press on 20 May 1944 as having been killed, although his name was incorrectly reported as "H.Estelic".

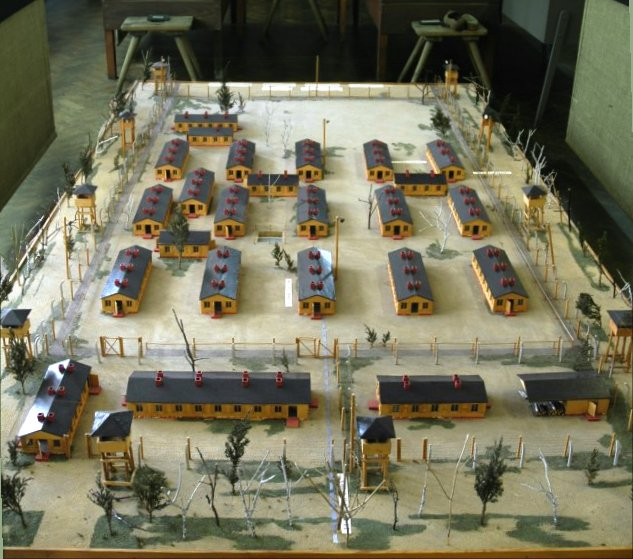
Model of Stalag Luft III prison camp.

== 'Great Escape' ==
Espelid was a regular member of the tunneling crew extending the tunnel code named "Harry", and appointed Chief of Intelligence for Norway, tasked with collating all available data which might assist escapers heading for Norway.

He was one of the 76 men who escaped the prison camp on the night of 24–25 March 1944 in the escape now famous as "the Great Escape". He teamed up with fellow Norwegian Nils Jørgen Fuglesang, James Catanach, an Australian who was fluent in German and spoke Norwegian, and the New Zealander of Danish ancestry Arnold George Christensen in a group heading for Denmark and possibly ultimately neutral Sweden. Espelid and his team reached Berlin as they were seen there by other escapers before they changed trains to Hamburg, which they also reached successfully only to be caught on the next leg of their rail journey from Hamburg to the naval town of Flensburg on the Danish border.

Nearing the Danish border on 26 March 1944 a suspicious policemen insisted on carefully examining their papers and checking their briefcases which contained newspapers and escape rations. Close inspection of their clothing revealed they were wearing altered greatcoats. Although the four escapees had split up to pretend to be travelling individually they were all in the same railway carriage, more policemen arrived and closely examined every passenger, soon arresting all four suspects. The escapers were taken to Flensburg prison.

The four escapees were handed over to the Kiel Gestapo and after interrogation were told that they would be taken by road back to prison camp. On 29 March 1944, two black sedan cars arrived, Catanach was taken in the first car with three Gestapo agents including SS-Sturmbannfuhrer Johannes Post, a senior officer based there. Post had his driver stop the car in the countryside outside Kiel about 1630 hours and called Catanach out into a field where he promptly shot him. The second car drew up in the same place shortly afterwards and Post told his agents to get the hand-cuffed Christensen, Espelid and Fuglesang out, stating that they should take a break before their long drive. As the airmen walked into the field they almost stumbled over Catanach's body as they were also shot. The four men were cremated at Kiel under Gestapo supervision.

Memorial to "The Fifty" down the road toward Żagań (Espelid at left)

Espelid was one of the 50 escapers who had been listed by SS-Gruppenfuhrer Arthur Nebe to be killed so was amongst those executed and murdered by the Gestapo. Originally his remains were buried at Sagan, but he is now buried in part of the Poznan Old Garrison Cemetery beside his brother escapers. He is commemorated by name on the "North Weald Memorial" at St Andrews Church, North Weald.

The Norwegians Fuglesang and Espelid were on the list of officers named in the British press on 20 May 1944 as having been killed.

== Awards ==
His actions as a prisoner were recognized by a Mention in Despatches by the Royal Air Force as none of the other relevant decorations then available could be awarded posthumously. It was not published in the supplement to the London Gazette on 8 June 1944 when the British and Commonwealth personnel were honoured for fear of reprisals against his family in German-occupied Norway.

== Other victims ==
The Gestapo executed a group of 50 of the recaptured prisoners representing almost all of the nationalities involved in the escape. Post-war investigations saw a number of those guilty of the murders tracked down, arrested and tried for their crimes.

Nationalities of the 50 executed
(United Kingdom) 21 British
(Canada) 6 Canadian
(Poland) 6 Polish
(Australia) 5 Australian
(South Africa) 3 South African
(New Zealand) 2 New Zealanders
(Norway) 2 Norwegian
(Belgium) 1 Belgian
(Czechoslovakia) 1 Czechoslovak
(France) 1 Frenchman
(Greece) 1 Greek
(Lithuania) 1 Lithuanian
