= Hitra =

Hitra may refer to:

== Places ==
- Hitra Municipality, a municipality in Trøndelag county, Norway
- Hitra (island), an island within Hitra Municipality in Trøndelag county, Norway
- Hitra Church, a church in Hitra Municipality in Trøndelag county, Norway
- Hitra Tunnel, a tunnel connecting the island of Hitra to the mainland of Norway
- Hitra Wind Farm, a 24-turbine wind farm located in Hitra Municipality in Norway

== Other ==
- HNoMS Hitra, a Royal Norwegian Navy submarine chaser that saw action during World War II
- Hitra official football team, the official football team for Hitra Municipality in Norway

== See also ==
- Hidra (disambiguation)
- Hirta (disambiguation)
