= Euxenite =

Oxide mineral

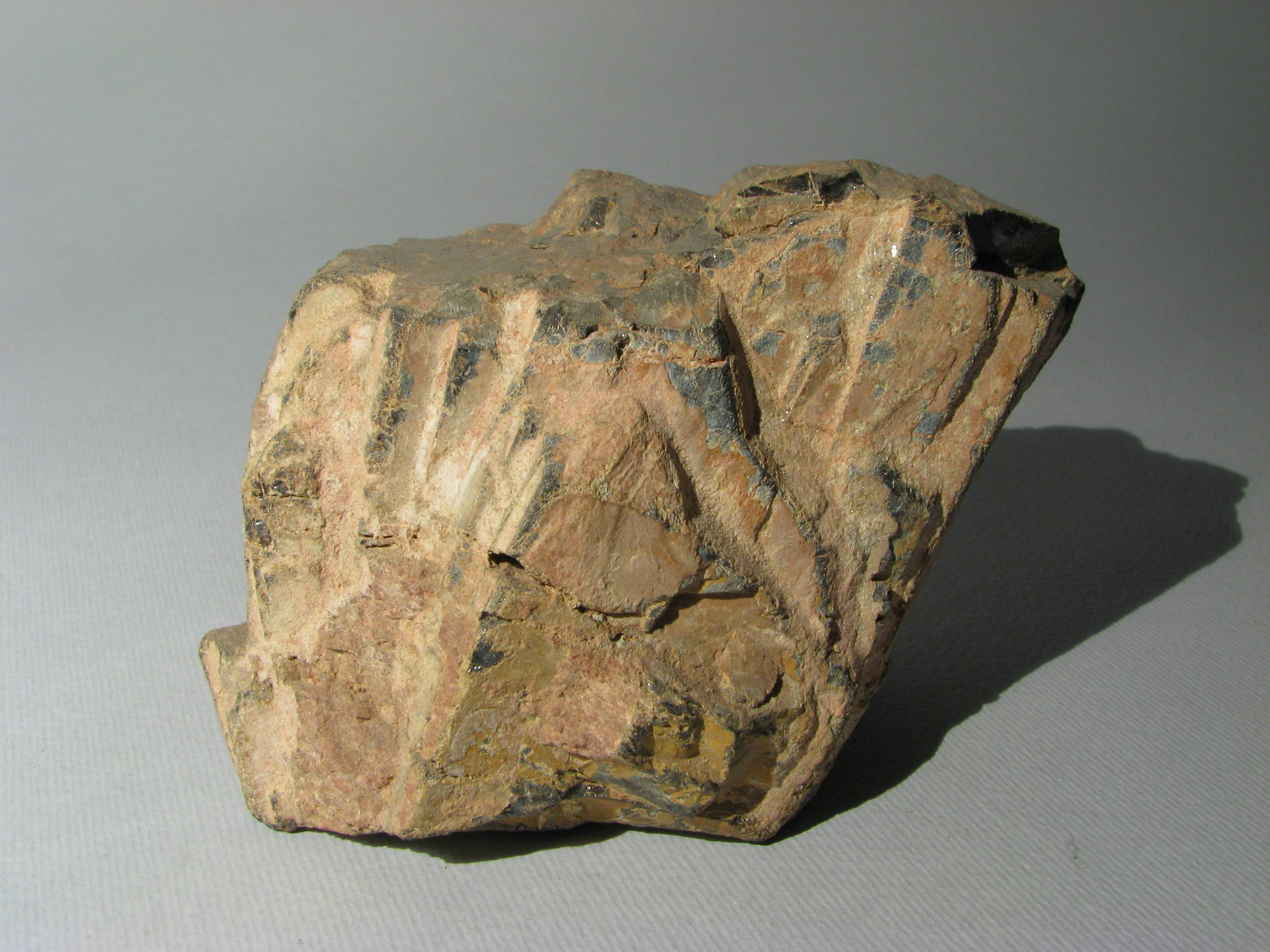
- Euxenite from Norway, around 11 cm of size

General
- Category: Oxide minerals
- Formula: (Y,Ca,Ce,U,Th)(Nb,Ta,Ti)_{2}O_{6}
- IMA symbol: Eux
- Strunz classification: 4.DG.05
- Crystal system: Orthorhombic
- Space group: Pcmn (no. 62)

Identification
- Color: Black, brownish black, greenish black
- Crystal habit: Massive, anhedral crystals in matrix
- Twinning: Common on [201]
- Cleavage: None
- Fracture: Conchoidal to subconchoidal
- Mohs scale hardness: 5.5 to 6.5
- Luster: Brilliant submetallic, waxy to resinous on fractures
- Streak: Yellowish, grayish, or reddish brown
- Diaphaneity: Opaque, translucent on thin edges
- Specific gravity: 4.7 to 5
- Optical properties: Isotropic
- Refractive index: n = 2.06 – 2.24
- Other characteristics: Metamict – originally crystalline, now amorphous due to radiation damage. Radioactive

Euxenite, or euxenite-(Y) (the official mineralogical name), is a brownish black mineral with a metallic luster.

== Chemistry ==
It contains calcium, niobium, tantalum, cerium, titanium, yttrium, and typically uranium and thorium, with some other metals. The chemical formula is (Y, Ca, Ce, U, Th)(Nb, Ta, Ti)_{2}O_{6}. It is commonly partially amorphous due to radiation damage.

Euxenite forms a continuous series with the titanium rich polycrase-(Y) having the formula (Y,Ca,Ce,U,Th)(Ti,Nb,Ta)_{2}O_{6}.

== Name and discovery ==
It was first described in 1870 and named for from the Greek (εὔξενος), hospitable or friendly to strangers, in allusion to the many rare elements that it contains.

== Occurrence ==
It occurs in granite pegmatites and detrital black sands.

It is found in many locations worldwide, notably its type locality in Jølster, Sunnfjord, Norway. Other locations include the Ural Mountains of Russia; Sweden; Minas Gerais, Brazil; Ampangabe, Madagascar; Ontario, Canada; and in Arizona, Wyoming and Colorado in the US.

== Use ==
Euxenite is used as an ore of the rare earth elements it contains. Rare large crystals have also been used in jewelry.
