= James Catanach =

RAAF bomber pilot (1921–1944)

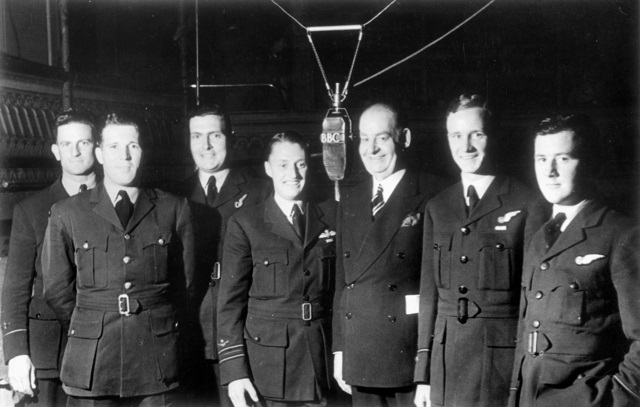
- RAAF airmen on the set of the BBC's Anzac Hour radio show, 1942. Catanach is in the centre (in uniform).
- Born: James Catanach; 28 November 1921; Melbourne, Victoria, Australia
- Died: 29 March 1944 (aged 22) near Kiel, Free State of Prussia, Nazi Germany
- Burial place: Poznan Old Garrison Cemetery, Poland
- Military career
- Allegiance: Australia
- Branch: Royal Australian Air Force
- Service years: 1940–44
- Rank: Squadron Leader
- Nickname: Jim
- Service number: Aus.400364
- Unit: No. 455 Squadron RAAF
- Conflicts: World War II; Channel Front (POW)
- Awards: Distinguished Flying Cross, Mentioned in despatches

James Catanach (28 November 1921 – 29 March 1944) was an Australian Handley Page Hampden bomber pilot who was taken prisoner during the Second World War. Reportedly the youngest squadron leader bomber pilot in the Royal Australian Air Force at the age of twenty, he took part in the 'Great Escape' from Stalag Luft III in March 1944 and was one of the men re-captured and murdered by the Gestapo.

== Pre-war life ==
Catanach was born in Melbourne, Victoria, Australia, the son of Ruby and William Catanach, a jeweller. He attended Brighton Grammar School from 1929 to 1931 and then Geelong Grammar School where he spent three years in the cadet corps. After graduating in 1938 he went to work with his older brother, Bill, in the family business.

== War service ==
James Catanach was a salesman until he joined the Royal Australian Air Force on 18 August 1940, to learn to fly. Meanwhile, his brother enlisted in the Army. On completion of basic initial training at Somers and Narrandera Catanach was posted to Canada where he learned to fly and received his pilot's wings in June 1941 being commissioned pilot officer. He was subsequently posted to Great Britain to fly with RAF Bomber Command. Initially flying with No. 144 Squadron RAF, he was transferred to No. 455 Squadron RAAF after completing nine missions.

No. 455 Squadron RAAF formed at RAF Swinderby, in Lincolnshire and had received Handley Page Hampden bombers by the time the bulk of the Australian personnel arrived on 1 September 1941, having departed Australia by sea on 15 June. Initially assigned to No. 5 Group RAF, Bomber Command in a bomber role, its first operation took place while the squadron was still forming, when a single Hampden attacked Frankfurt at night on 29 August. In doing so, according to the Australian War Memorial, the squadron had the distinction of becoming the "first Australian squadron to bomb Germany". Following this, the squadron increased its operational tempo, undertaking several mine laying operations off the coast of occupied France, as well attacking industrial targets in Germany. These missions were flown by Jim Catanach.

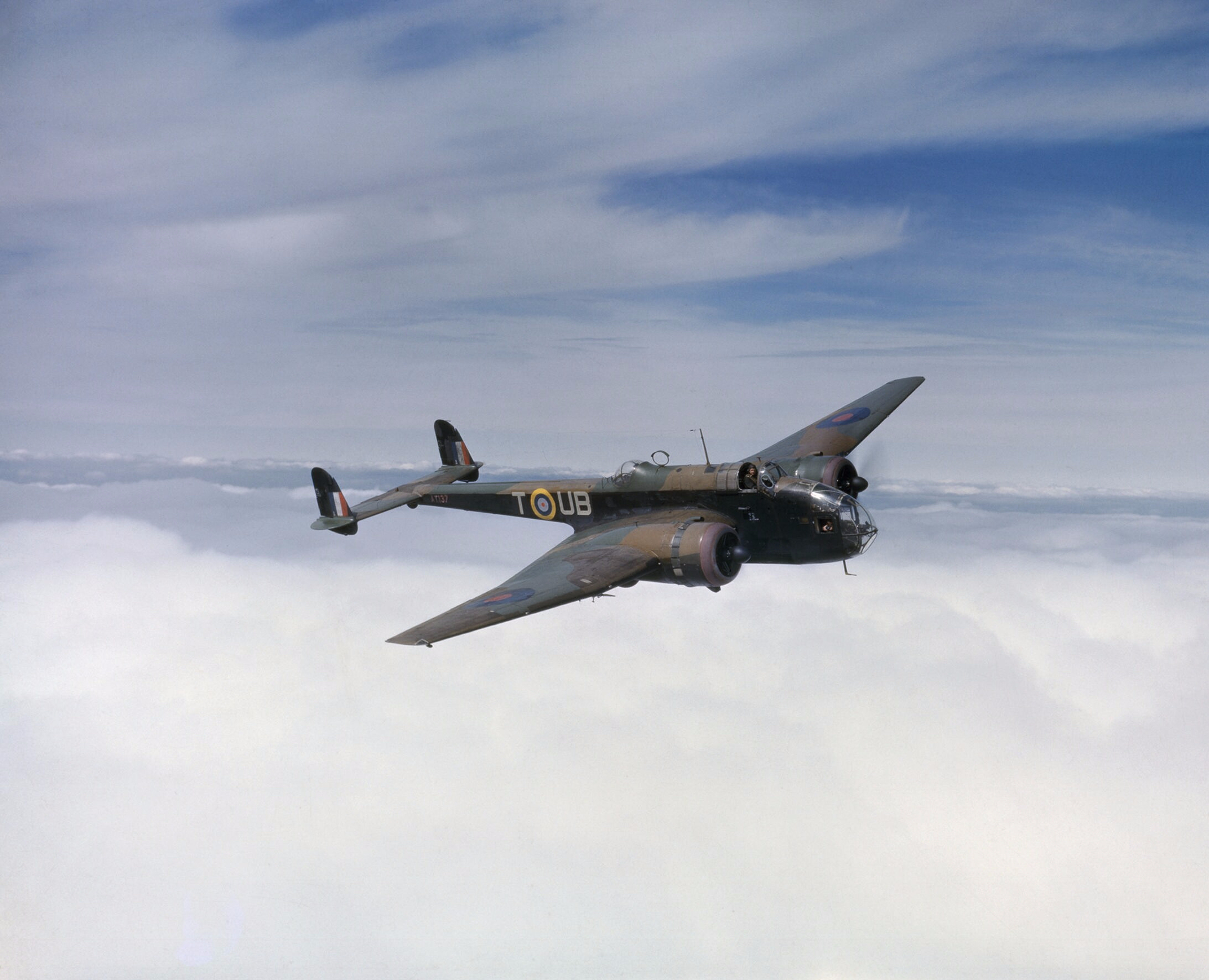
A No. 455 Squadron RAAF Hampden, 1942

In February 1942, the squadron took part in an unsuccessful attack on the German battleships Scharnhorst and Gneisenau, before being re-roled as a torpedo-bomber squadron and transferred to RAF Coastal Command on 26 April 1942; they subsequently deployed a detachment briefly to Vaenga (now Severomorsk) in the Soviet Union in September. Catanach had completed nine operations with RAF Bomber Command before the transfer. The detachment was to operate in support of convoys bound for Russia, which were at the time suffering heavy losses. However, three of the 16 Hamptons were lost prior to arrival, one of them flown by Catanach. After completing one anti-shipping sweep with the Russians the remaining aircraft were handed over to the Soviet Air Forces with the RAAF crews instructing the Soviets on their operation. Following the completion of this task the squadron returned to RAF Sumburgh. In June 1942, Catanach was promoted squadron leader, becoming reputedly the youngest in the Royal Australian Air Force to hold that rank.

== Prisoner of war ==
Catanach and his crew took off in Handley Page Hampden serial number "AT109" from RAF Sumburgh at 20:40 hours on the night of 4/5 September 1942 for Vaenja, Northern Russia, via Afrikanda. Nearing the end of the long flight his aircraft was holed in the petrol tanks by ground fire or heavy machine gun fire from a German trawler and Catanach force landed under fire on the shoreline near Kirkenes (Northern Norway) as he closed in on Murmansk avoiding ditching in the Arctic waters and saving the lives of his crew. Captured immediately by a nearby German patrol, he and his crew became prisoners of war and Catanach was eventually put into prisoner of war camp Stalag Luft III in the province of Lower Silesia near the town of Sagan (now Żagań in Poland).

== The Great Escape ==
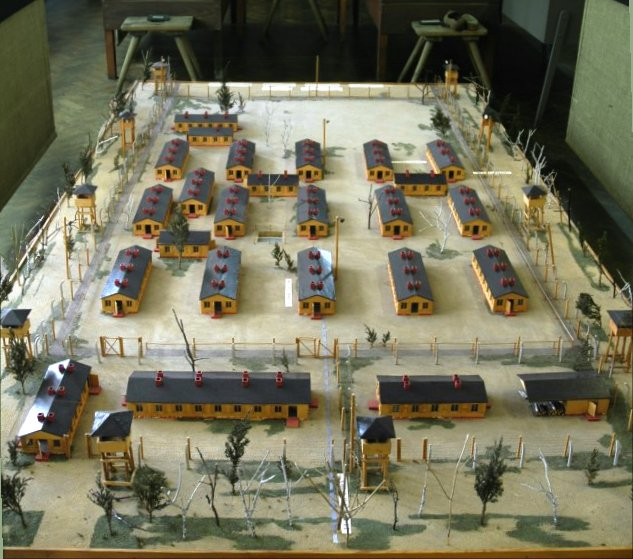
Model of Stalag Luft III prison camp.

Catanach was one of the 76 men who escaped the prison camp on the night of 24–25 March 1944 in the escape now famous as "the Great Escape". Catanach was fluent in German and took trouble to learn conversational Norwegian from Scandinavian prisoners in the prison camp. He teamed up with two Norwegians, Halldor Espelid and Nils Jørgen Fuglesang, and the New Zealander Arnold George Christensen who was of Scandinavian descent, in a group heading for Denmark and possibly ultimately neutral Sweden. Catanach and Christensen reached Berlin as they were seen there by other escapers before changing trains to Hamburg which they also reached successfully only to be caught on the next leg of their rail journey from Hamburg to the naval town of Flensburg on the Danish border. Nearing the border suspicious policemen insisted on carefully examining their papers, checking their briefcases which contained newspapers and escape rations. Close inspection of their clothing revealed they were wearing altered greatcoats. Although the four escapers has split up to pretend to be travelling individually they were all in the same railway carriage, more policemen arrived and closely examined every passenger, soon arresting all four suspects. The escapers were taken to Flensburg prison.

Memorial to "The Fifty" down the road toward Żagań (Catanach at left)

The four airmen were handed over to the Kiel Gestapo and after interrogation were told that they would be taken by road back to prison camp. On 29 March 1944, two or three black sedan cars arrived, Catanach was taken in the first car with three Gestapo agents including SS-Sturmbannfuhrer Johannes Post a senior officer based there. Post had his driver stop the car in the countryside outside Kiel about 1630 hours and called Catanach out into a field where he promptly shot him. The second (and possibly a third) car drew up in the same place shortly afterwards and Post told his agents to get Christensen, Espelid and Fuglesang out, stating that they should take a break before their long drive. As the airmen walked into the field they almost stumbled over Catanach's body as they were also shot. Catanach was one of the 50 escapers who had been listed by SS-Gruppenfuhrer Arthur Nebe to be killed so was amongst those executed and murdered by the Gestapo. His cremated remains were buried at Sagan but he now lies in part of the Poznan Old Garrison Cemetery. The Australian press maintained a chase for information and justice for their murdered airmen. Strangely his name was not on the list of murdered officers which was published by newspapers on 20 May 1944.

== Awards ==
The Distinguished Flying Cross was awarded on 23 June 1942 to Acting Flight Lieutenant James Catanach (Aus.400364), Royal Australian Air Force, No. 455 Squadron RAAF. On three occasions he brought his aircraft and crew home seriously despite severe battle damage. He had made bombing attacks on Essen, Cologne, Lubeck, Hamburg, Kiel and Lorient.

His conspicuous bravery as a prisoner was recognized by a Mention in Despatches as none of the other relevant decorations then available could be awarded posthumously. It was published in a supplement to the London Gazette on 8 June 1944.

His awards were presented posthumously to his father at Government House, Melbourne, Victoria, on 16 September 1944.
