= Flekkefjord Church =

Church in Agder, Norway

- Flekkefjord kirke
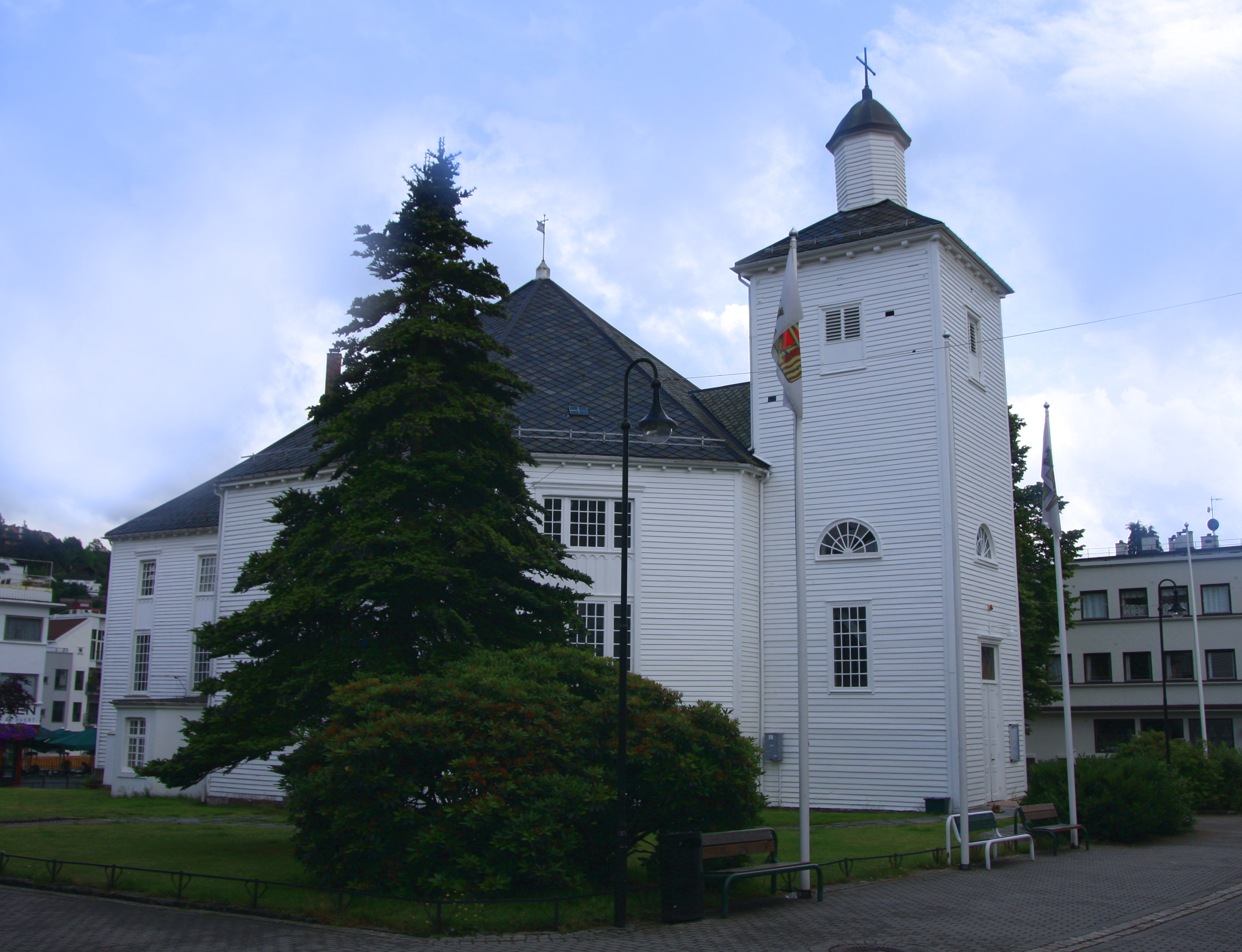
- View of the church
- Flekkefjord Church
- 58.2961°N 06.6619°E
- Location: Flekkefjord Municipality, Agder
- Country: Norway
- Denomination: Church of Norway
- Churchmanship: Evangelical Lutheran
- Website: flekkefjord.kirken.no

History
- Status: Parish church
- Founded: 12th century

Architecture
- Functional status: Active
- Architect: Hans Linstow
- Architectural type: Octagonal
- Style: Empire style
- Completed: 1833; 193 years ago

Specifications
- Capacity: 650
- Materials: Wood

Administration
- Diocese: Agder og Telemark
- Deanery: Lister og Mandal prosti
- Parish: Flekkefjord
- Norwegian Cultural Heritage Site
- Type: Church
- Status: Automatically protected
- ID: 84159

Flekkefjord Church (Norwegian: Flekkefjord kirke) is a parish church of the Church of Norway in the large Flekkefjord Municipality in Agder county, Norway. It is located in the town of Flekkefjord. It is the church for the Flekkefjord parish which is part of the Lister og Mandal prosti (deanery) in the Diocese of Agder og Telemark. The white, wooden church was built in the Empire style and in an octagonal design in 1833 using plans drawn up by the architect Hans Linstow. The church seats about 650 people.

It has galleries with audience seating on two floors along five of the walls. The altarpiece is a gold cross in an arch, flanked by columns carrying a gable. The pulpit is from 1938 and signed by Linstow. Today's church organ is built specifically for Flekkefjord Church by Marcussen & Sons Orgelbyggeri in Aabenraa, Denmark, and was finished in 1983. The organ has 24 voices.

== History ==
The earliest existing historical records of the church date back to the year 1460, but there is evidence that suggest that the church was likely built during the 12th century. The medieval stave church stood until around the year 1783 when it was torn down. A new timber-framed, octagonal building was completed on the same site about three years later. In 1831, the church was again torn down and replaced with a larger building on the same site. The new church was also had an octagonal design. The new church was consecrated in January 1833.

== Media gallery ==
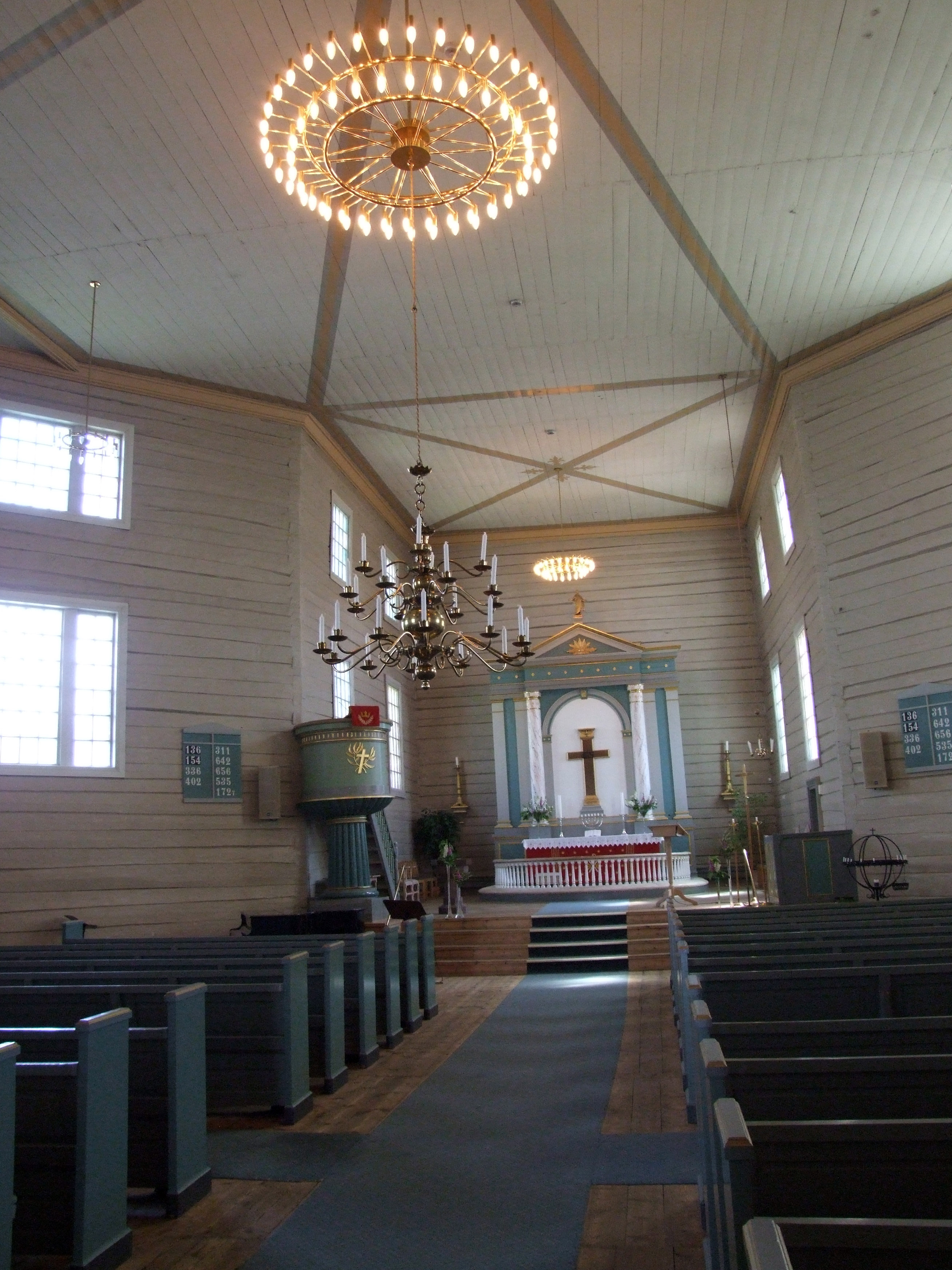
Interior of the church

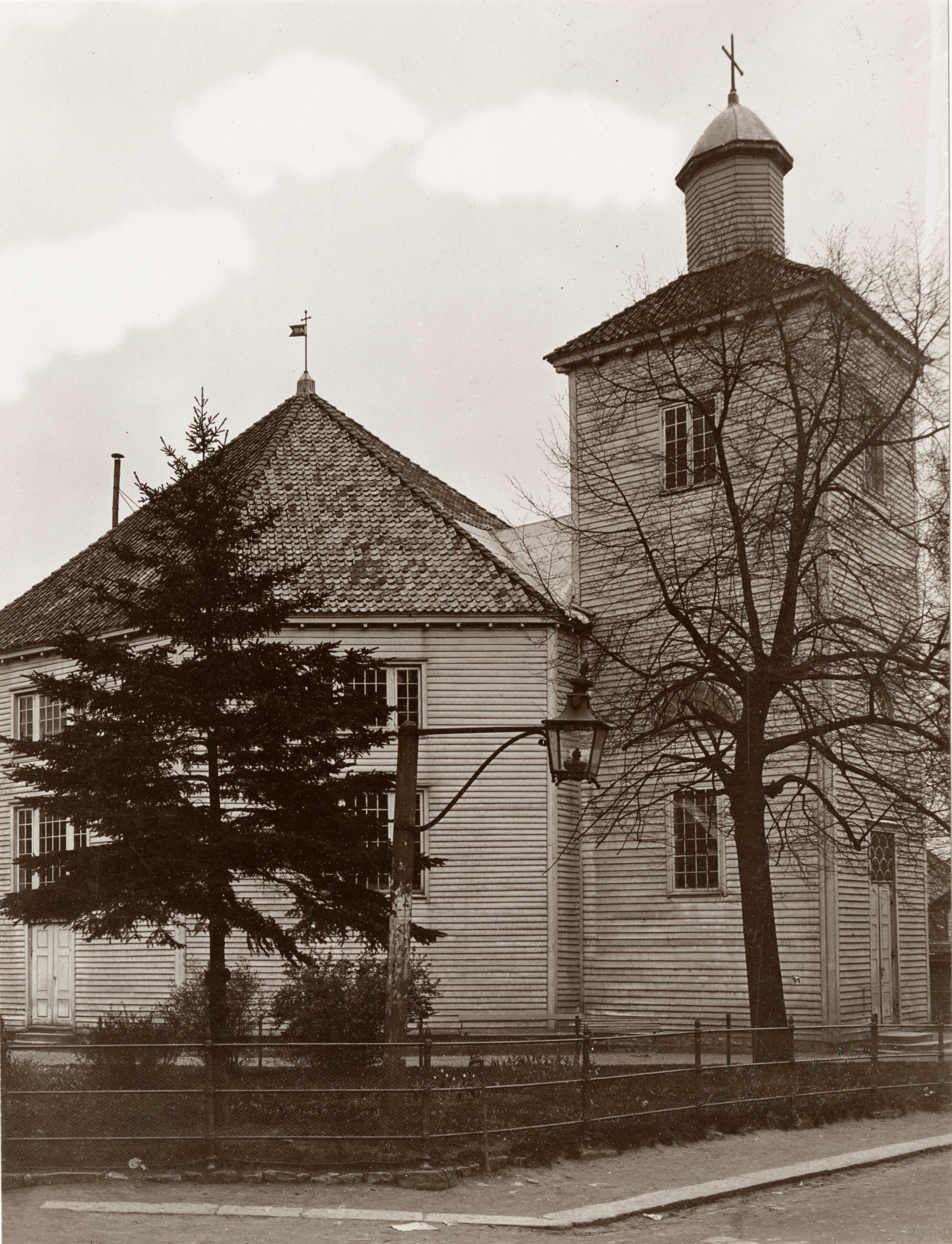
Exterior of the church

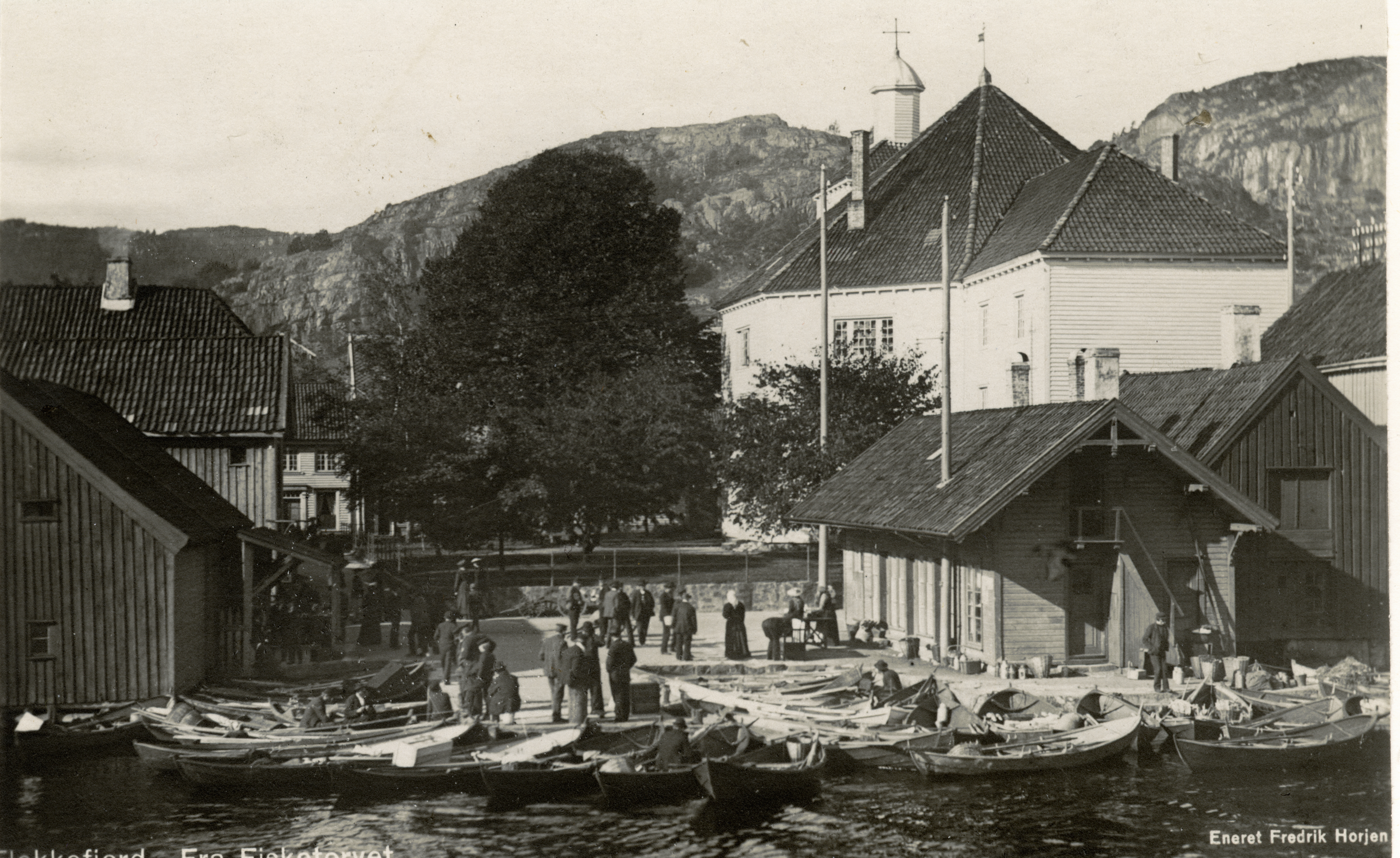
View of the surrounding neighborhood

== See also ==
- List of churches in Agder og Telemark
