= Hidra Municipality =

Former municipality in Vest-Agder, Norway

Hidra Municipality Hidra herred
- Former municipality
- Hitterø herred (historic name)
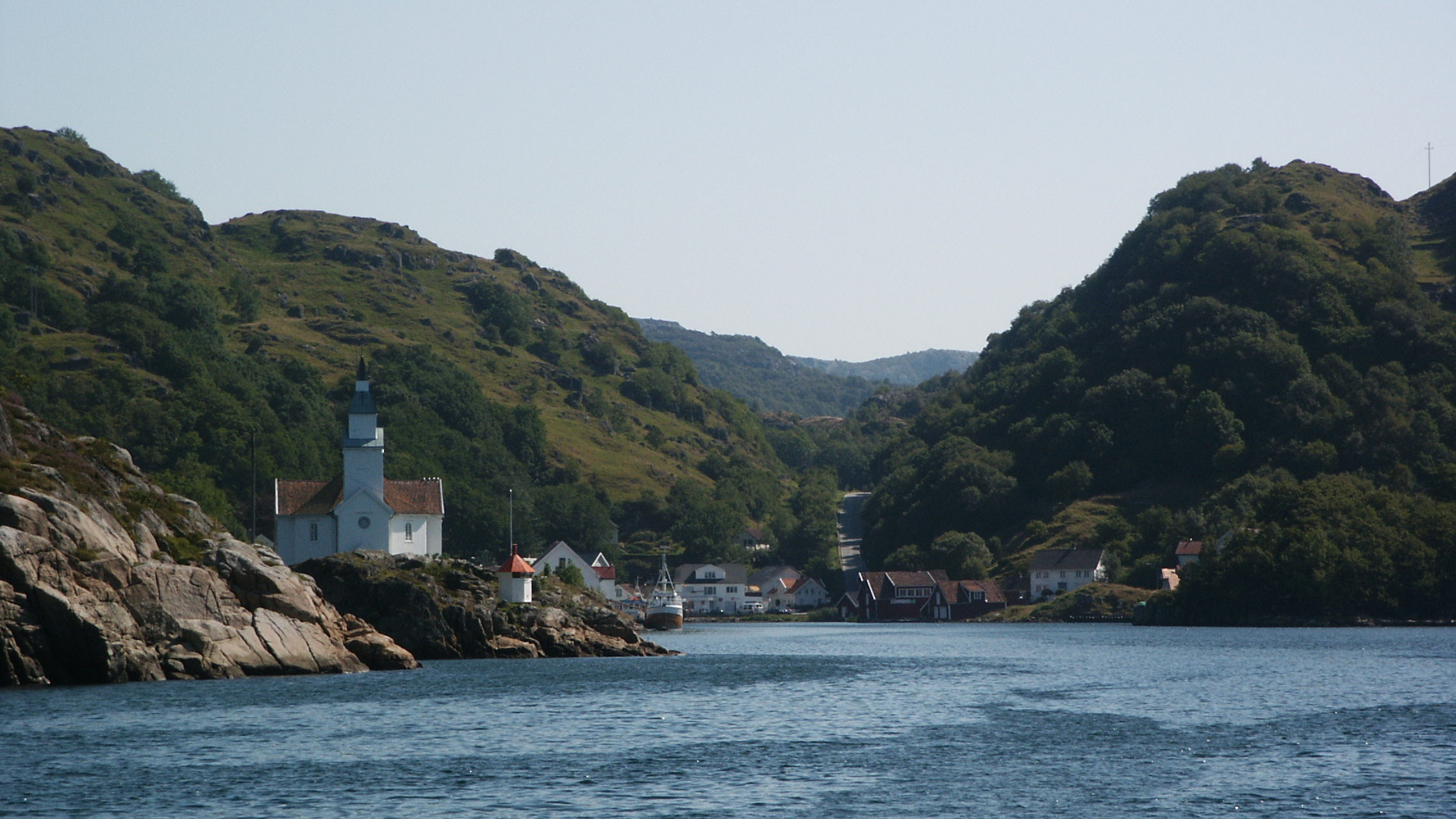
- The village of Kirkehavn on Hidra

- Vest-Agder within Norway

- Hidra within Vest-Agder
- Coordinates: 58°13′15″N 06°34′45″E
- Country: Norway
- County: Vest-Agder
- District: Lister
- Established: 8 Oct 1893
  - Preceded by: Nes og Hitterø Municipality
- Disestablished: 1 Jan 1965
  - Succeeded by: Flekkefjord Municipality
- Administrative centre: Kirkehamn

Area (upon dissolution)
  - Total: 89.6 km^{2} (34.6 sq mi)
  - Rank: #430 in Norway
- Highest elevation: 377 m (1,237 ft)

Population (1964)
  - Total: 1,294
  - Rank: #467 in Norway
  - Density: 14.4/km^{2} (37/sq mi)
  - Change (10 years): ▼ −7.5%

Official language
  - Norwegian form: Neutral
- Time zone: UTC+01:00 (CET)
  - Summer (DST): UTC+02:00 (CEST)
- ISO 3166 code: NO-1042

Hidra is a former municipality in the old Vest-Agder county, Norway. The 89.6-square-kilometre (34.6 sq mi) municipality existed from 1893 until its dissolution in 1965. The area is now part of Flekkefjord Municipality in the traditional district of Lister in Agder county. The administrative centre was the village of Kirkehamn where Hidra Church is located.

Prior to its dissolution in 1965, the 89.6-square-kilometre (34.6 sq mi) municipality was the 430th largest by area out of the 525 municipalities in Norway. Hidra Municipality was the 467th most populous municipality in Norway with a population of about 1,294. The municipality's population density was 14.4 inhabitants per square kilometre (37/sq mi) and its population had decreased by 7.5% over the previous 10-year period.

== General information ==
The municipality of Hitterø was established on 8 October 1893 when the old Nes og Hitterø Municipality was split into two: the northern district (population: 1,704) became the new Nes Municipality and the southern district (population: 2,075) became the new Hitterø Municipality.

During the 1960s, there were many municipal mergers across Norway due to the work of the Schei Committee. On 1 January 1965, Nes Municipality was dissolved and the following areas were merged to form a new, larger Flekkefjord Municipality:

- the town of Flekkefjord (population: 3,163)
- all of Hidra Municipality (population: 1,277)
- all of Nes Municipality (population: 2,757)
- all of Gyland Municipality (population: 691)
- most of Bakke Municipality (population: 925), except for the Øksendal area which went to Sirdal Municipality

=== Name ===
The municipality (originally the parish) is named after the island of Hidra (Old Norse: Hitrar) since the first Hidra Church was built there. The name is the plural form of hitr which means "split" or "cleft" (referring to the fact that the island is almost split in two by the Rasvåg fjord).

Historically, the name of the municipality was spelled Hitterø. On 3 November 1917, a royal resolution changed the spelling of the name of the municipality to Hidra.

=== Churches ===
The Church of Norway had one parish (sokn) within Hidra Municipality. At the time of the municipal dissolution, it was part of the Flekkefjord prestegjeld and the Flekkefjord prosti (deanery) in the Diocese of Agder.

Churches in Hidra Municipality
Parish (sokn)	Church name	Location of the church	Year built
Hidra	Hidra Church	Kirkehamn	1854

== Geography ==
The municipality encompassed the islands of Hidra and Andabeløya as well as 56 other islands, plus the mainland coast from Abelsnes to the river Sira. The highest point in the municipality was the 377-metre (1,237 ft) tall mountain Myrekilen. Lund Municipality was located to the north (in Rogaland county), Nes Municipality was located to the east, Herad Municipality was located to the southeast, Lista Municipality was located to the south, the North Sea was to the southwest, and Sokndal Municipality was located to the northwest (in Rogaland county).

== Government ==
While it existed, Hidra Municipality was responsible for primary education (through 10th grade), outpatient health services, senior citizen services, welfare and other social services, zoning, economic development, and municipal roads and utilities. The municipality was governed by a municipal council of directly elected representatives. The mayor was indirectly elected by a vote of the municipal council. The municipality was under the jurisdiction of the Flekkefjord District Court and the Agder Court of Appeal.

=== Municipal council ===
The municipal council (Herredsstyre) of Hidra Municipality was made up of 13 representatives that were elected to four year terms. The tables below show the historical composition of the council by political party.

Hidra kommunestyre 1963–1964
Party name (in Norwegian)	Number of representatives
Labour Party (Arbeiderpartiet)	2
Conservative Party (Høyre)	3
Christian Democratic Party (Kristelig Folkeparti)	3
Liberal Party (Venstre)	5
Total number of members:	13
Note: On 1 January 1965, Nes Municipality became part of Flekkefjord Municipality.

Hidra herredsstyre 1959–1963
Party name (in Norwegian)	Number of representatives
Labour Party (Arbeiderpartiet)	2
Conservative Party (Høyre)	2
Christian Democratic Party (Kristelig Folkeparti)	3
Liberal Party (Venstre)	6
Total number of members:	13

Hidra herredsstyre 1956–1959
Party name (in Norwegian)	Number of representatives
Local List(s) (Lokale lister)	13
Total number of members:	13

Hidra herredsstyre 1952–1955
Party name (in Norwegian)	Number of representatives
Local List(s) (Lokale lister)	12
Total number of members:	12

Hidra herredsstyre 1948–1951
Party name (in Norwegian)	Number of representatives
Labour Party (Arbeiderpartiet)	2
Local List(s) (Lokale lister)	10
Total number of members:	12

Hidra herredsstyre 1945–1947
Party name (in Norwegian)	Number of representatives
Local List(s) (Lokale lister)	12
Total number of members:	12

Hidra herredsstyre 1938–1941*
Party name (in Norwegian)	Number of representatives
Labour Party (Arbeiderpartiet)	2
Joint List(s) of Non-Socialist Parties (Borgerlige Felleslister)	9
Local List(s) (Lokale lister)	1
Total number of members:	12
Note: Due to the German occupation of Norway during World War II, no elections were held for new municipal councils until after the war ended in 1945.

=== Mayors ===
The mayor (Norwegian: ordfører) of Hidra Municipality was the political leader of the municipality and the chairperson of the municipal council. The following people have held this position:

- 1893–1898: Ole Sivertsen Kirkehavn
- 1898–1904: Nils Fuglesang
- 1904–1913: Petter Jakobsen
- 1914–1916: Nils Fuglesang
- 1917–1923: Lauritz Ulland
- 1923–1938: Sven E. Lemvig

== Notable people ==
- Olav Omland (1909–1998), a landscape and coastal painter, a poet and songwriter, and composer of the song about Hidra "Hidrasangen"
- Tatjana Lars Kristian Guldbrandsen, the eccentric personality and artist

== See also ==
- List of former municipalities of Norway
