= Kirkehamn =

Village in Flekkefjord Municipality, Norway

Kirkehamn Kirkehavn (unofficial)
- Village
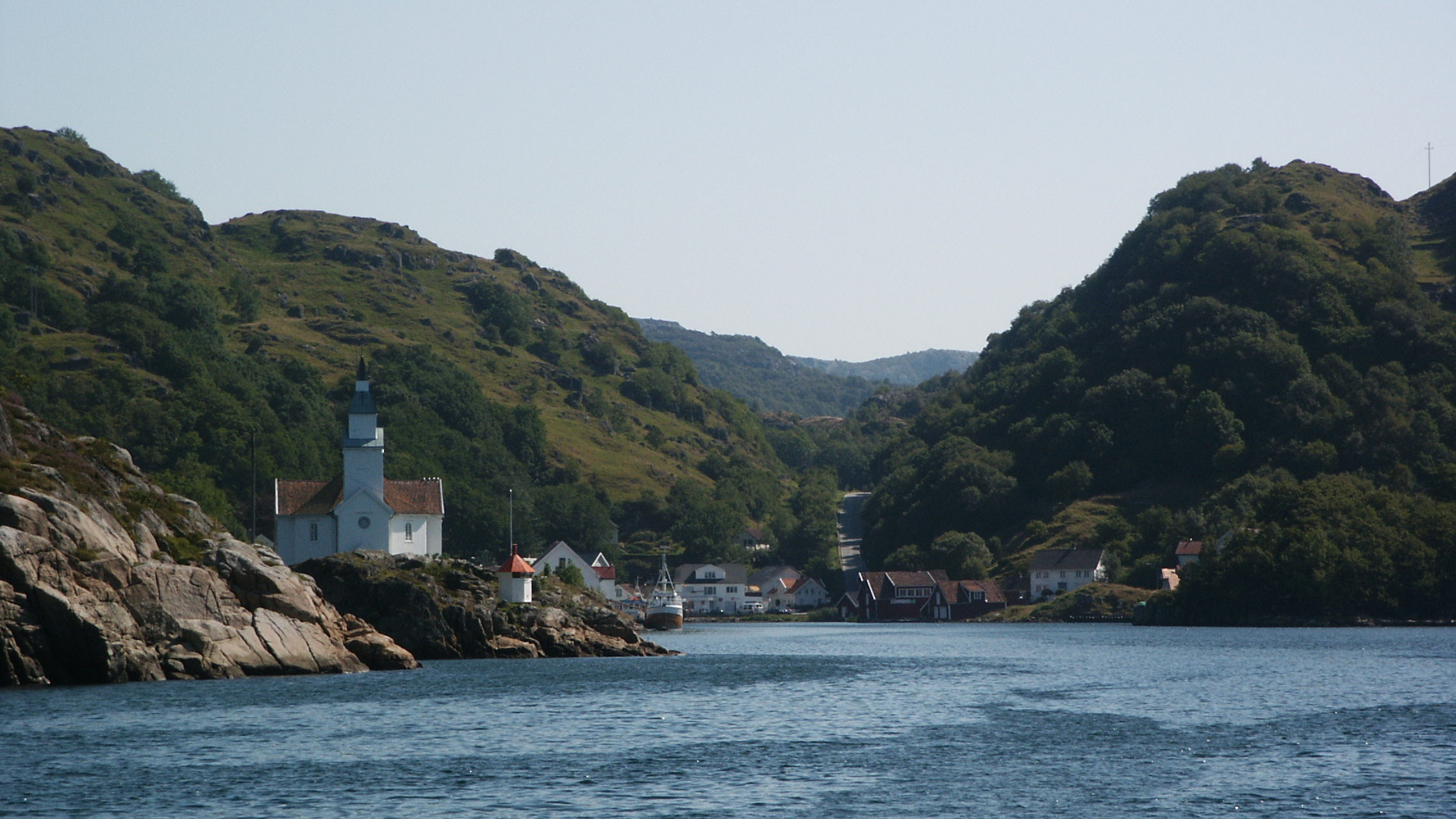
- View of the village on the island of Hidra
- Interactive map of Kirkehamn
- Coordinates: 58.23197°N 6.53851°E
- Country: Norway
- Region: Southern Norway
- County: Agder
- District: Lister
- Municipality: Flekkefjord Municipality
- Elevation: 1 m (3.3 ft)
- Time zone: UTC+01:00 (CET)
  - Summer (DST): UTC+02:00 (CEST)
- Post Code: 4432 Hidrasund

Kirkehamn (lit. 'Church harbour') is a fishing village in Flekkefjord Municipality in Agder county, Norway. The village is one of two harbours on the Norwegian island Hidra. Kirkehamn lies on the west end of the island, while the other harbour, Rasvåg lies on the south side of the island. Hidra Church is located in the village. The village is home to about 231 residents (as of 2020).

== History ==
The village was the administrative centre of the old Hidra Municipality, which existed prior to 1965.
