= Ingrid Espelid Hovig =

Norwegian chef and author

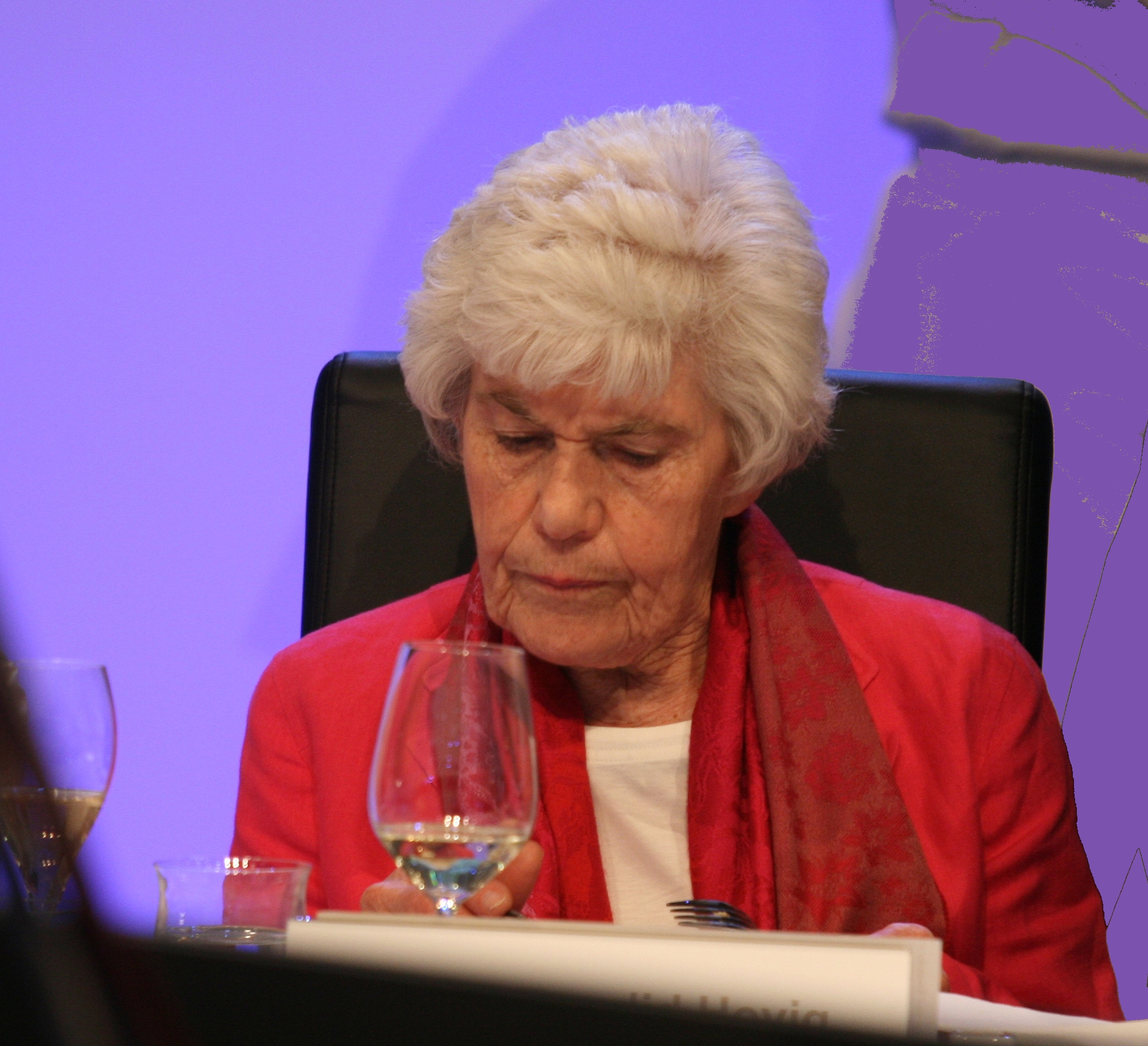
Ingrid Espelid Hovig on the jury of Bocuse d'Or Europe 2008 in Stavanger

Ingrid Espelid Hovig (3 June 1924 – 3 August 2018) was a Norwegian television chef and author of cook books. Through appearances on her cooking show Fjernsynskjøkkenet over 26 years, between 1970 and 1996, she came to be considered the "culinary mother" of the country, with the comparison "the Julia Child of Norway" often applied.

== Early life and background ==
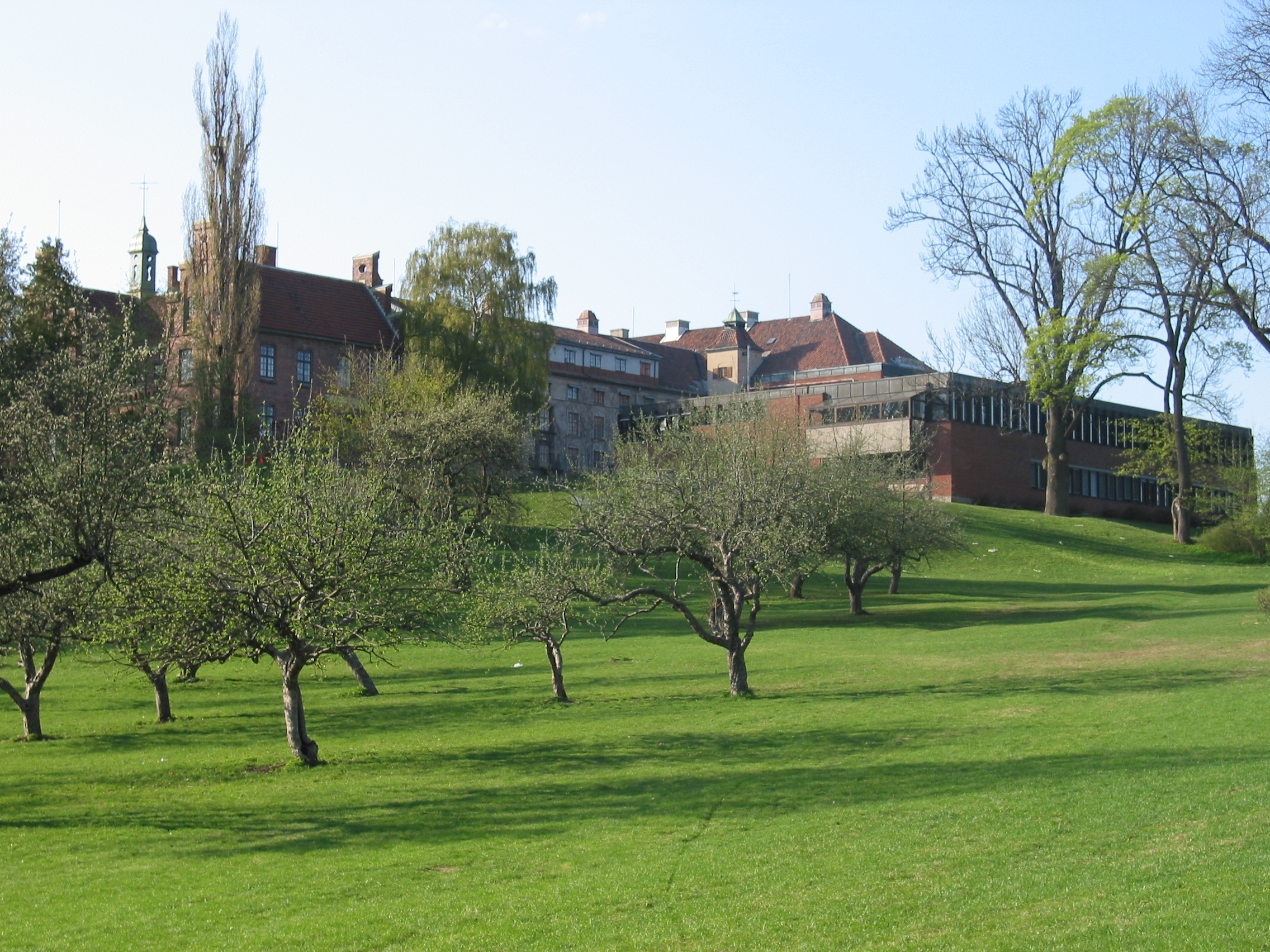
Her alma mater

Ingrid Espelid was born on Askøy Municipality, near Bergen, and grew up in Kleppestø. She graduated from the Norwegian State College for Domestic Science Teachers in 1950, and became acquainted with the French cuisine during a stay in Paris.

One of her brothers was Liberal politician Mons Espelid, and another, Halldor Espelid, was one of the 50 Allied airmen who were executed by the Gestapo after taking part in "the Great Escape" from a German prisoner of war camp in 1944.

== Career ==
Upon joining the Norwegian Broadcasting Corporation in 1962 as program secretary for nutrition and consumer material, she became part of the country's first generation of television celebrities. Between 1965 and 1998 she recorded 300 episodes of her cooking programme.

She authored over 50 cookbooks. She edited Den rutete kokeboken, which is considered a national cook book. In 2008 the newspaper Dagbladet recognized her 1967 book Ingrid Espelid ber til bords as among the twenty-five most influential prose books in post-1945 Norway.

After her retirement, she continued to accept assignments from publishing companies, and other short-term engagements.

Hovig was also a political candidate for the Liberal Party of Norway, and was a deputy representative in the borough council of Frogner, Oslo.

== Recognition ==
Hovig was the first non-American to receive the International Association of Culinary Professionals' Lifetime Achievement Award. In 1986 she received the Norwegian award Kringkastingsprisen and in 1994 she was awarded Knight, First Class of the Royal Norwegian Order of St. Olav. She was an honorary juror at the inaugural Bocuse d'Or Europe in 2008.

In 2014, notable Norwegian chefs contributed recipes to a book honouring Hovig's influence in the country, titled 90 dishes for Ingrid Espelid Hovig.

== Personal life ==
At the age of 53 she married the architect Jan Inge Hovig, who designed the Arctic Cathedral in Tromsø. He died of a heart attack a week after the wedding, aged 57.

She belonged to the International Organisation of Good Templars, a fraternal organization which is part of the temperance movement, promoting abstinence from alcohol and other drugs. In her 80s, she was considered a trendsetter for women of her generation who adopted her trademark hair style.

Hovig died at the age of 94 on 3 August 2018.
