= Rasvåg =

Village in Flekkefjord Municipality, Norway

- Village
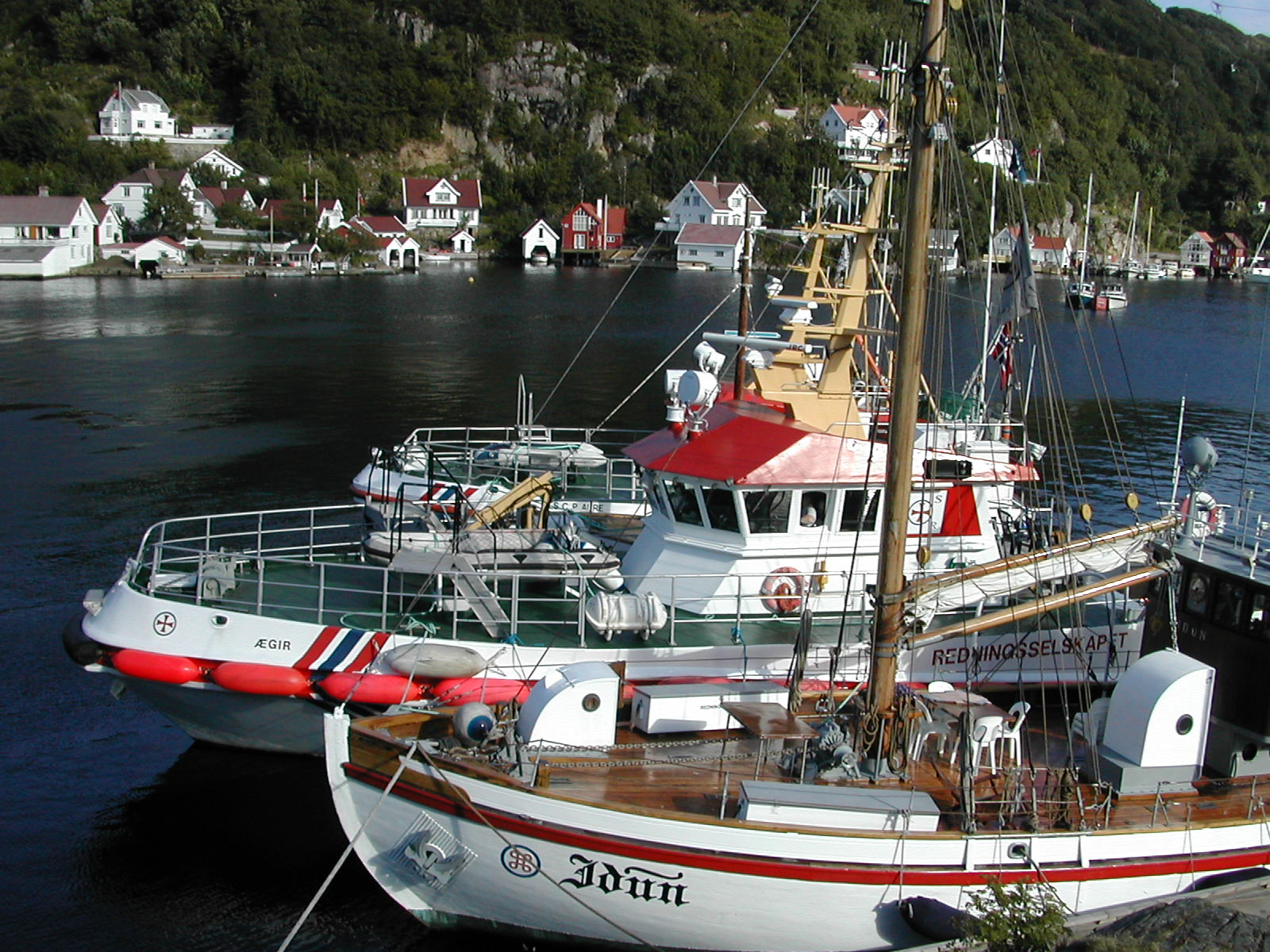
- View of the village harbour
- Interactive map of Rasvåg
- Coordinates: 58.21284°N 6.58149°E
- Country: Norway
- Region: Southern Norway
- County: Agder
- District: Lister
- Municipality: Flekkefjord Municipality
- Elevation: 2 m (6.6 ft)
- Time zone: UTC+01:00 (CET)
  - Summer (DST): UTC+02:00 (CEST)
- Post Code: 4432 Hidrasund

Rasvåg is a fishing village in Flekkefjord Municipality in Agder county, Norway. The village is one of two harbours on the Norwegian island of Hidra. Rasvåg is located on the south side of the island and the other harbour, Kirkehamn, is located on the west side, about 4 kilometres (2.5 mi) away.
