= Mons Espelid =

Norwegian politician

Mons Espelid (22 April 1926 – 16 March 2009) was a Norwegian politician for the Liberal Party and dentist.

He was born in Askøy Municipality as a son of manager Ivar Espelid (1880–1946) and teacher Gudrid Eidnes (1883–1959). He was a brother of Ingrid Espelid Hovig and through her a brother-in-law of Jan Inge Hovig.

He was a member of the Parliament of Norway from 1981–1985, where he sat in the Standing Committee on Finance and Economic Affairs. He was mayor of Askøy from 1975 to 1977 and from 1979 to 1981, and deputy mayor from 1978 to 1979.
