= Arnold Christensen =

Royal New Zealand Air Force officer

Arnold George Christensen
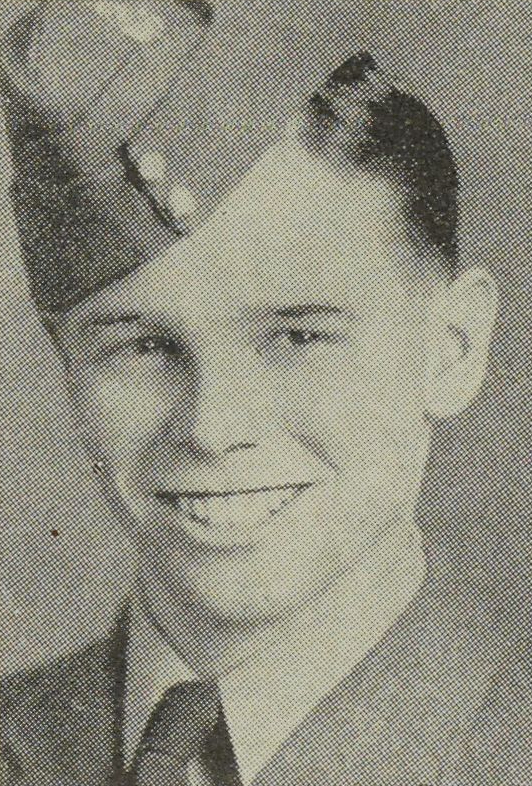
- Born: Arnold George Christensen; 8 April 1922; New Zealand
- Died: 29 March 1944 (aged 21) near Kiel, Germany
- Burial place: Poznan Old Garrison Cemetery, Poland
- Military career
- Allegiance: New Zealand
- Branch: Royal New Zealand Air Force
- Service years: 1940–1944
- Rank: Flight Lieutenant
- Service number: NZ.413380
- Unit: No. 26 Squadron RAF
- Conflicts: World War II; Channel Front (POW)
- Awards: Mentioned in Despatches

Arnold George Christensen (8 April 1922 – 29 March 1944) was a New Zealand Mustang fighter pilot who was taken prisoner during the Second World War during the Dieppe Raid, he is notable for the part he took in the 'Great Escape' from Stalag Luft III in March 1944 and as one of the men recaptured and subsequently executed by the Gestapo.

== Pre-war life ==
Christensen was born in Hastings, Hawke's Bay, New Zealand. His Danish father, Anton, from Randers, Denmark had settled in New Zealand about 1912 and married a young widow, Lilian Allen, nee Ladbrook. Lilian had a daughter, Hazel, from her first marriage. Arnold became a member of 2nd Hastings Boy Scout Troop and after leaving school decided to go into journalism gaining a position with the Hawke's Bay Daily Mail newspaper.

== War service ==
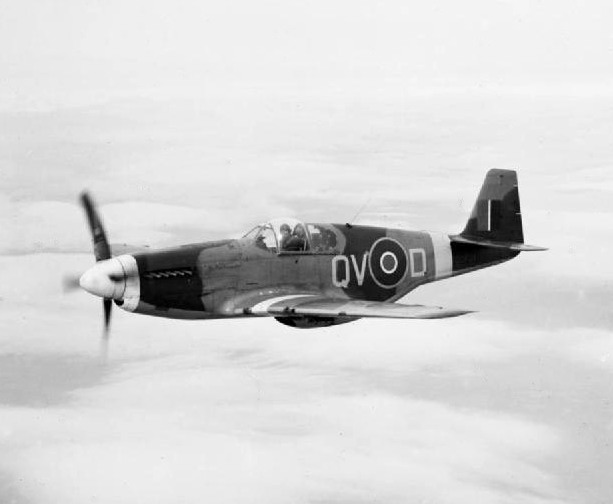
Mustang fighter in service with the RAF.

Christensen applied to join the Royal New Zealand Air Force as a pilot on 19 June 1940 and on 14 June 1941 he was called up for flying training which he did at New Plymouth flying De Havilland Tiger Moth aircraft. On 20 October 1941 he sailed to Canada to continue his flight training. at No. 4 Service Flying Training School, Saskatoon, Saskatchewan On 27 February 1942 Christensen passed out as a qualified service pilot and received his "wings" aircrew brevet, being commissioned pilot officer on the same day. Christensen sailed for England in March 1942 and on 2 June 1942 was posted to No. 41 Operational Training Unit RAF, Old Sarum Airfield, Wiltshire to complete his fighter pilot training being posted to No. 26 Squadron RAF on 13 August 1942. The squadron operated in the tactical reconnaissance and ground support role.

== Prisoner of war ==
At 0800 hours on 19 August 1942 flying a tactical reconnaissance mission in support of the amphibious commando Dieppe Raid Pilot Officer Christensen of No. 26 Squadron RAF flying Mustang Mark Ia serial number "AL977" as wingman to Pilot Officer E E O’Farrell (flying "AG463"). Neither pilot returned from the mission, their aircraft being two of five which their squadron were to lose that day Both aircraft were shot down by machine-gun fire from the ground. His lead pilot’s aircraft quite quickly dived into the sea off shore, and Christensen tried to make it back across the English Channel, but halfway to safety his engine seized, and he had to ditch on the water, spending two days adrift in a tiny dinghy before being washed ashore on the French coast and taken prisoner. He was promoted to flying officer in 1943.

== 'Great Escape' ==
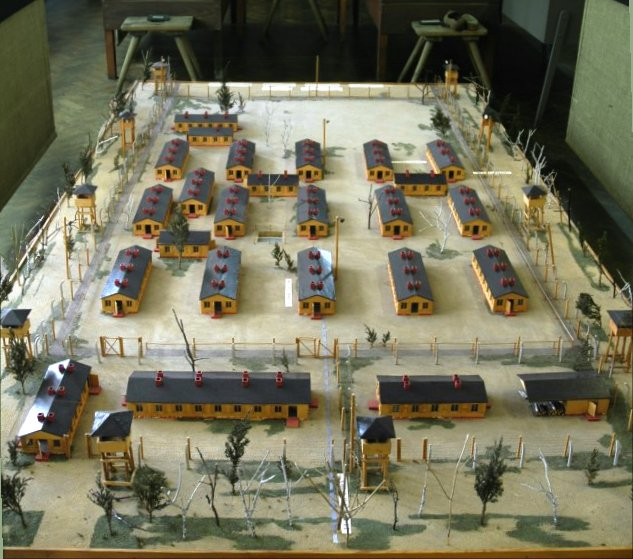
Model of Stalag Luft III prison camp.

Christensen was one of the 76 men who escaped the prison camp on the night of 24–25 March 1944 in the escape now famous as "the Great Escape". He spoke Danish and some German and was the escape committee’s Intelligence expert on Denmark He teamed up with two Norwegians, Halldor Espelid and Nils Jorgen Fugelsang and the Australian James Catanach who spoke excellent German and conversational Norwegian, in a group heading for Denmark and possibly ultimately neutral Sweden. James Catanach and Arnold Christensen reached Berlin as they were seen there by other escapers before changing trains to Hamburg which they also reached successfully only to be caught on the next leg of their rail journey from Hamburg to the naval town of Flensburg on the Danish border. Nearing the border suspicious policemen insisted on carefully examining their papers, checking their briefcases which contained newspapers and escape rations. Close inspection of their clothing revealed they were wearing altered greatcoats. Although the four escapees had split up pretending to be travelling individually hoping to reduce the risk of recapture they were all in the same railway carriage, more policemen arrived and closely examined every passenger, soon arresting all four suspects. The escapees were taken to Flensburg prison. The four airmen were handed over to the Kiel Gestapo and after interrogation were told that they would be taken by road back to prison camp. On 29 March 1944 two or three black sedan cars arrived, Christensen was taken in the second (or possibly a third) car which was flagged down by their senior officer SS-Sturmbannfuhrer Johannes Post who stood beside his own car beside the road in the countryside outside Kiel about 1630 hours. Post had just taken his own prisoner James Catanach into the field and shot him. Post told his agents to get Christensen, Espelid and Fugelsang out, stating that they should take a break before their long drive. As the airmen walked into the field they almost stumbled over Catanach’s body as they were also shot.

Christensen was one of the 50 escapees who had been listed by SS-Gruppenfuhrer Arthur Nebe, reportedly on Hitler’s personal order, to be killed so was amongst the unfortunate executed and murdered by the Gestapo. he was cremated at Kiel. Originally his remains were buried at Sagan, but he is now buried in part of the Poznan Old Garrison Cemetery. His name was amongst the 47 murdered officers named in the British press when the story became public knowledge on or about 20 May 1944 Photographs of Christensen and his headstone are displayed by Auckland War Memorial Museum and another by DigitalNZ.

The New Zealand and Australian press maintained a chase for information and justice for their murdered airmen.

Memorial to "The Fifty" down the road toward Żagań (Christensen at left)

== Awards ==
His conspicuous bravery as a prisoner was recognised by a Mention in Despatches as none of the other relevant decorations then available could be awarded posthumously. It was published in a supplement to the London Gazette on 8 June 1944.

== Other victims ==
See Stalag Luft III murders

The Gestapo executed a group of 50 of the recaptured prisoners representing almost all of the nationalities involved in the escape. Post-war investigations saw a number of those guilty of the murders tracked down, arrested and tried for their crimes.

Nationalities of the 50 executed
(United Kingdom) 21 British
(Canada) 6 Canadian
(Poland) 6 Polish
(Australia) 5 Australian
(South Africa) 3 South African
(New Zealand) 2 New Zealanders
(Norway) 2 Norwegian
(Belgium) 1 Belgian
(Czechoslovakia) 1 Czechoslovak
(France) 1 Frenchman
(Greece) 1 Greek
(Lithuania) 1 Lithuanian
