= Hidra Church =

Church in Agder, Norway

- Hidra kirke
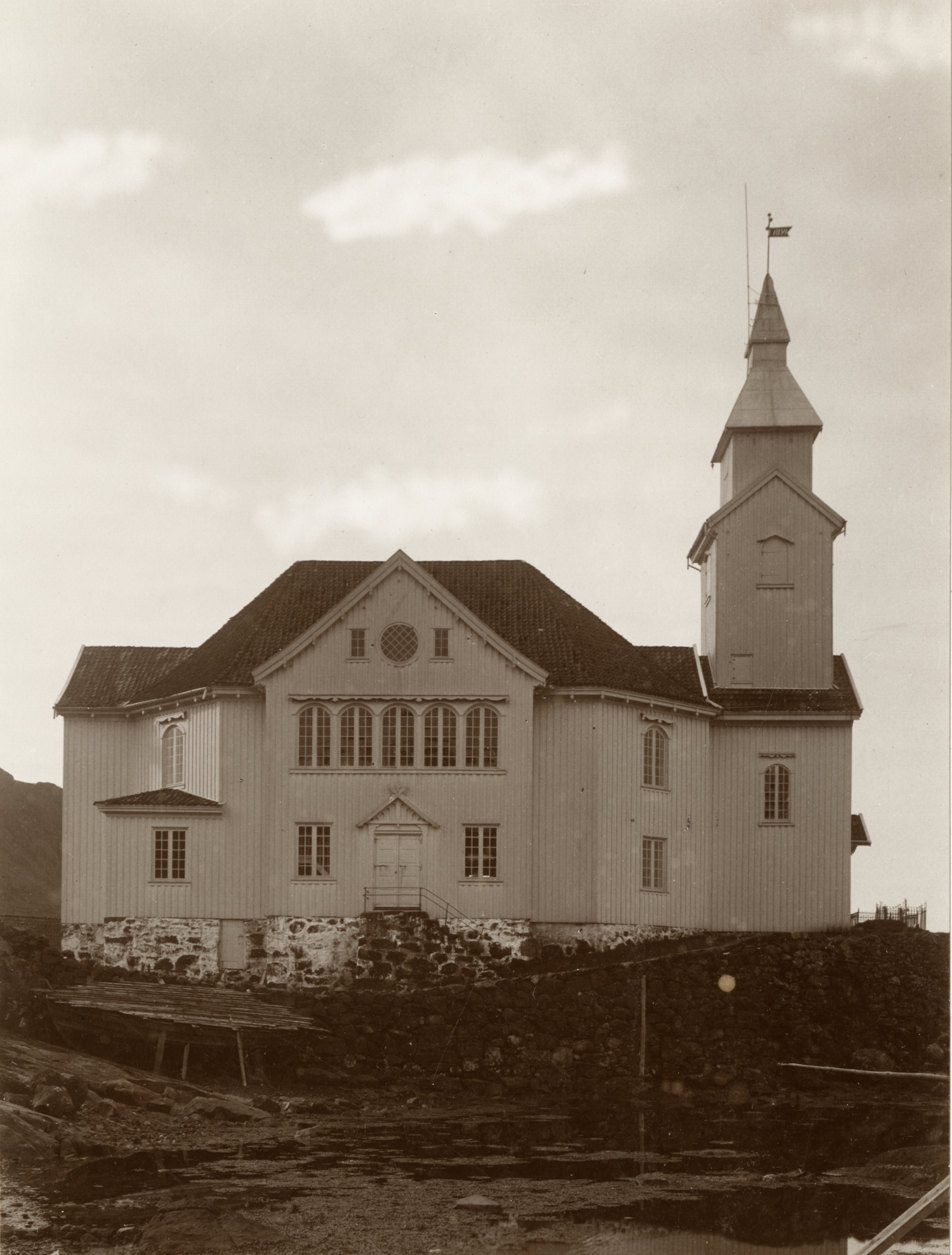
- View of the church
- Hidra Church
- 58.232628°N 06.53357°E
- Location: Flekkefjord Municipality, Agder
- Country: Norway
- Denomination: Church of Norway
- Churchmanship: Evangelical Lutheran

History
- Status: Parish church

Architecture
- Functional status: Active
- Architect: Christian Heinrich Grosch
- Architectural type: Octagonal
- Completed: 1854; 172 years ago

Specifications
- Capacity: 700
- Materials: Wood

Administration
- Diocese: Agder og Telemark
- Deanery: Lister og Mandal prosti
- Parish: Hidra
- Norwegian Cultural Heritage Site
- Type: Church
- Status: Listed
- ID: 84572

Hidra Church (Norwegian: Hidra kirke) is a parish church of the Church of Norway in the large Flekkefjord Municipality in Agder county, Norway. It is located in the village of Kirkehamn on the island of Hidra. It is the church for the Hidra parish which is part of the Lister og Mandal prosti (deanery) in the Diocese of Agder og Telemark. The white, wooden church was built in a octagonal design in 1854 using plans drawn up by the architect Christian Heinrich Grosch. The church seats about 700 people.

== History ==
The earliest existing historical records of the church date back to the year 1348, but its baptismal font has been dated back to the 1200s, so that may be the date the church was initially founded. The first church on the site was likely a wooden stave church on a small islet, just off the coast. At some point, the wooden church was taken down and replaced with a stone church. In 1520 during the reign of King Christian II of Denmark-Norway, bandits sailed into the harbour and set fire to the church. That stone church was torn down around the year 1610 and replaced with a timber-framed long church. During the 18th century, it was converted into a cruciform design by additions built to the north and the south of the nave. From 1800 to 1818, the small strait that separated the island on which the church sat and the main part of the island of Hidra was filled in so that the church was no longer located on an island, but rather was connected to the main (large) island of Hidra. In 1854, the old church was torn down and replaced with a new building that has an octagonal design. The new church was constructed on the same site, but a few meters to the east of the old structure since the strait had been filled in and there was now more room to build the church.

In 1814, this church served as an election church (Norwegian: valgkirke). Together with more than 300 other parish churches across Norway, it was a polling station for elections to the 1814 Norwegian Constituent Assembly which wrote the Constitution of Norway. This was Norway's first national elections. Each church parish was a constituency that elected people called "electors" who later met together in each county to elect the representatives for the assembly that was to meet at Eidsvoll Manor later that year.

== See also ==
- List of churches in Agder og Telemark
