= Hidra (island) =

Island in Agder, Norway

Hidra Hitterø (historic name)
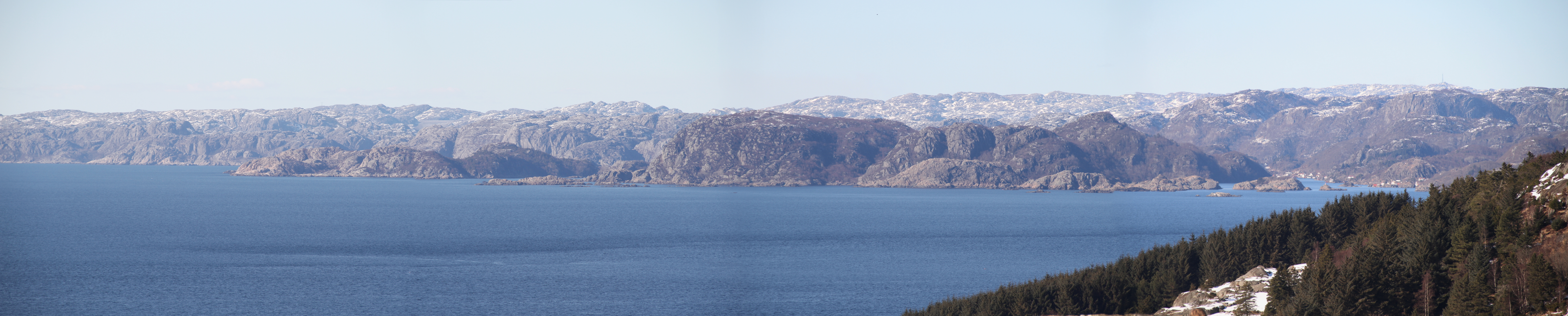
- View of Hidra from the east
- Interactive map of Hidra; Hitterø (historic name)

Geography
- Location: Agder, Norway
- Coordinates: 58.2300°N 06.5477°E
- Area: 20.4 km^{2} (7.9 sq mi)
- Area rank: 1st in Agder
- Length: 4 km (2.5 mi)
- Width: 7 km (4.3 mi)
- Highest elevation: 291 m (955 ft)
- Highest point: Langelandsfjella

Administration
- Norway
- County: Agder
- Municipality: Flekkefjord Municipality

Demographics
- Population: 528 (2015)

Hidra (historically spelled Hitterø) is the largest island in Agder county, Norway. The 20.8-square-kilometre (8.0 sq mi) island lies within Flekkefjord Municipality, south of the mainland coast, separated from it by the 350-metre (1,150 ft) wide Hidrasund strait and the Listafjorden. As of 2015, the island had about 500 residents, mostly living on the west side in Kirkehavn, where Hidra Church is located. Rasvåg is another main village, located on the south side of the island. In 2007, the Norwegian government studied the possibility of constructing an undersea tunnel to connect the island to the mainland without the use of a ferry; however, the project was deemed too costly relative to its benefits.

The island was the center of the former Hidra Municipality, which existed from 1893 until 1965.

== Geography ==
The island consists almost entirely of granite, with some moraine deposits. The interior of the island is more hospitable, featuring oak and other deciduous trees. The island is nearly divided into two halves by the Rasvågfjorden, and the Eie Canal was constructed through the narrow isthmus to allow small boats to pass through.

== Name ==
The Old Norse form of the name was 'Hitr'. The name is probably derived from a word meaning "split" or "cleft", referring to the island's near division by the Rasvåg fjord. Before 1918, the name was spelled Hitterø.

== See also ==
- List of islands of Norway
