= Mandal Municipality =

Former municipality in Vest-Agder, Norway

Mandal Municipality Mandal kommune
- Former municipality
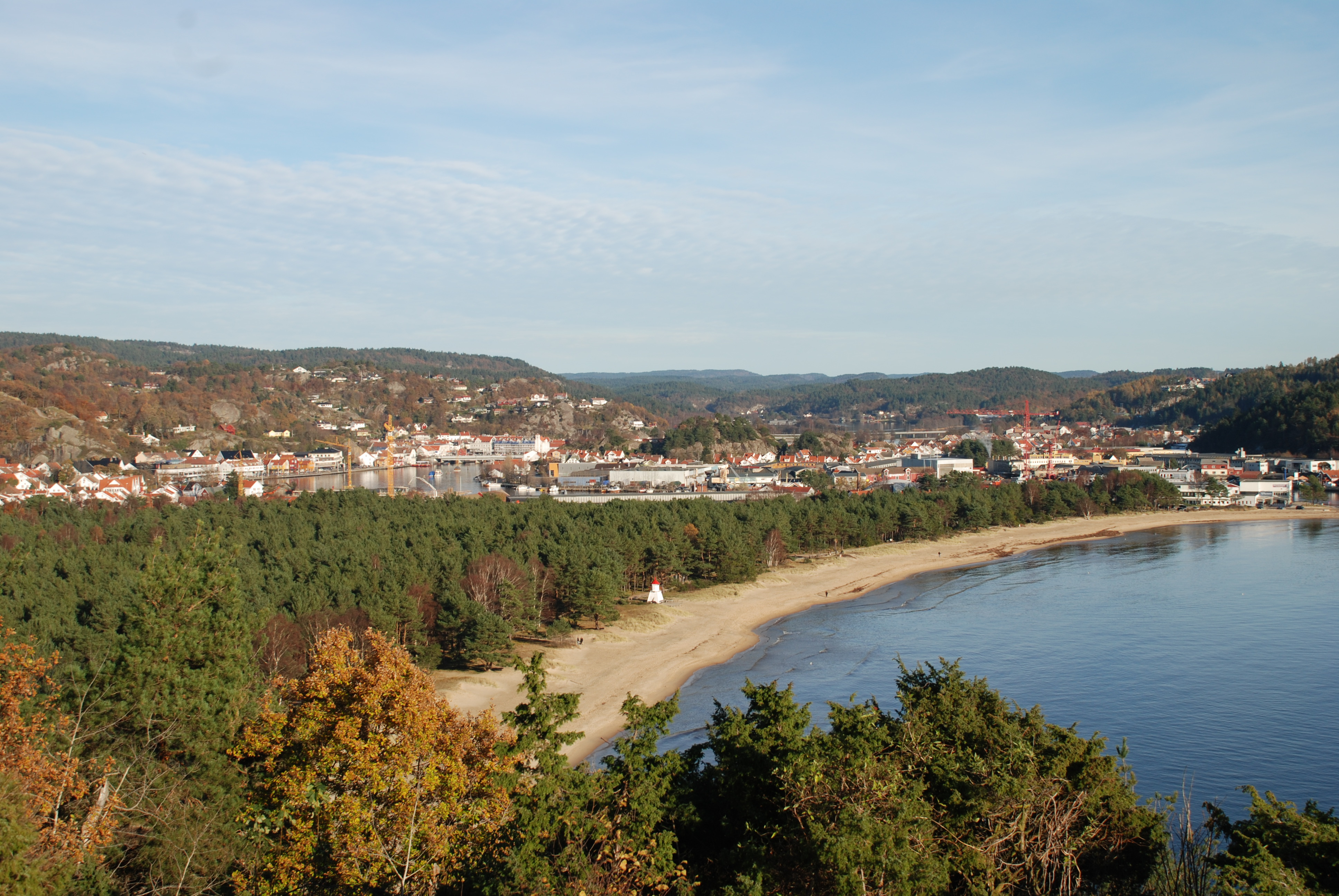
- View of Sjøsanden, a beach in Mandal

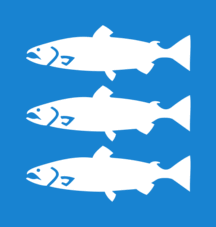
- Flag Coat of arms

- Vest-Agder within Norway

- Mandal within Vest-Agder
- Coordinates: 58°02′45″N 07°29′44″E
- Country: Norway
- County: Vest-Agder
- District: Sørlandet
- Established: 1 Jan 1838
  - Created as: Formannskapsdistrikt
- Disestablished: 1 Jan 2020
  - Succeeded by: Lindesnes Municipality
- Administrative centre: Mandal

Government
  - Mayor (2015–2019): Alf Erik Andersen (FrP)

Area (upon dissolution)
  - Total: 222.84 km^{2} (86.04 sq mi)
  - Land: 210.63 km^{2} (81.32 sq mi)
  - Water: 12.21 km^{2} (4.71 sq mi) 5.5%
  - Rank: #321 in Norway
- Highest elevation: 315.5 m (1,035 ft)

Population (2019)
  - Total: 15,659
  - Rank: #77 in Norway
  - Density: 74.3/km^{2} (192/sq mi)
  - Change (10 years): ▲ +7.7%
- Demonym: Mandalitt

Official language
  - Norwegian form: Bokmål
- Time zone: UTC+01:00 (CET)
  - Summer (DST): UTC+02:00 (CEST)
- ISO 3166 code: NO-1002
- Website: Official website

Mandal (Norwegian: [mɑn.ˌdɑːl]) is a former municipality in the old Vest-Agder county, Norway. The 222.84-square-kilometre (86.04 sq mi) municipality existed from 1838 until its dissolution in 2020. The area is now part of Lindesnes Municipality in the traditional district of Sørlandet in Agder county. The administrative centre of the municipality is the town of Mandal. The town of Mandal was the second largest town by population in the old Vest-Agder county after the nearby town of Kristiansand and it is also the fourth largest city in all of the Sørlandet/Agder region. Besides the town of Mandal, the municipality also includes the villages of Bykjernen, Skjebstad, Sånum-Lundevik, Skogsfjord-Hesland, Krossen, Harkmark, Skinsnes-Ime, and Tregde-Skjernøya.

At the time of its dissolution in 2020, the 223-square-kilometre (86 sq mi) municipality is the 321st largest by area out of the 422 municipalities in Norway. Mandal is the 77th most populous municipality in Norway with a population of 15,600. The municipality's population density is 74.1 inhabitants per square kilometre (192/sq mi) and its population has increased by 9.9% over the last decade.

The river Mandalselva is a salmon river that flowed through the municipality with its river mouth just outside the town. The town of Mandal has many small, white-painted wooden houses, which is typical of towns at the southern coast of Norway (Sørlandet). The European route E39 highway connecting Kristiansand and Stavanger was the main road through the municipality. There were connecting airplane flights and ferries to Europe from the nearby town of Kristiansand.

== General information ==
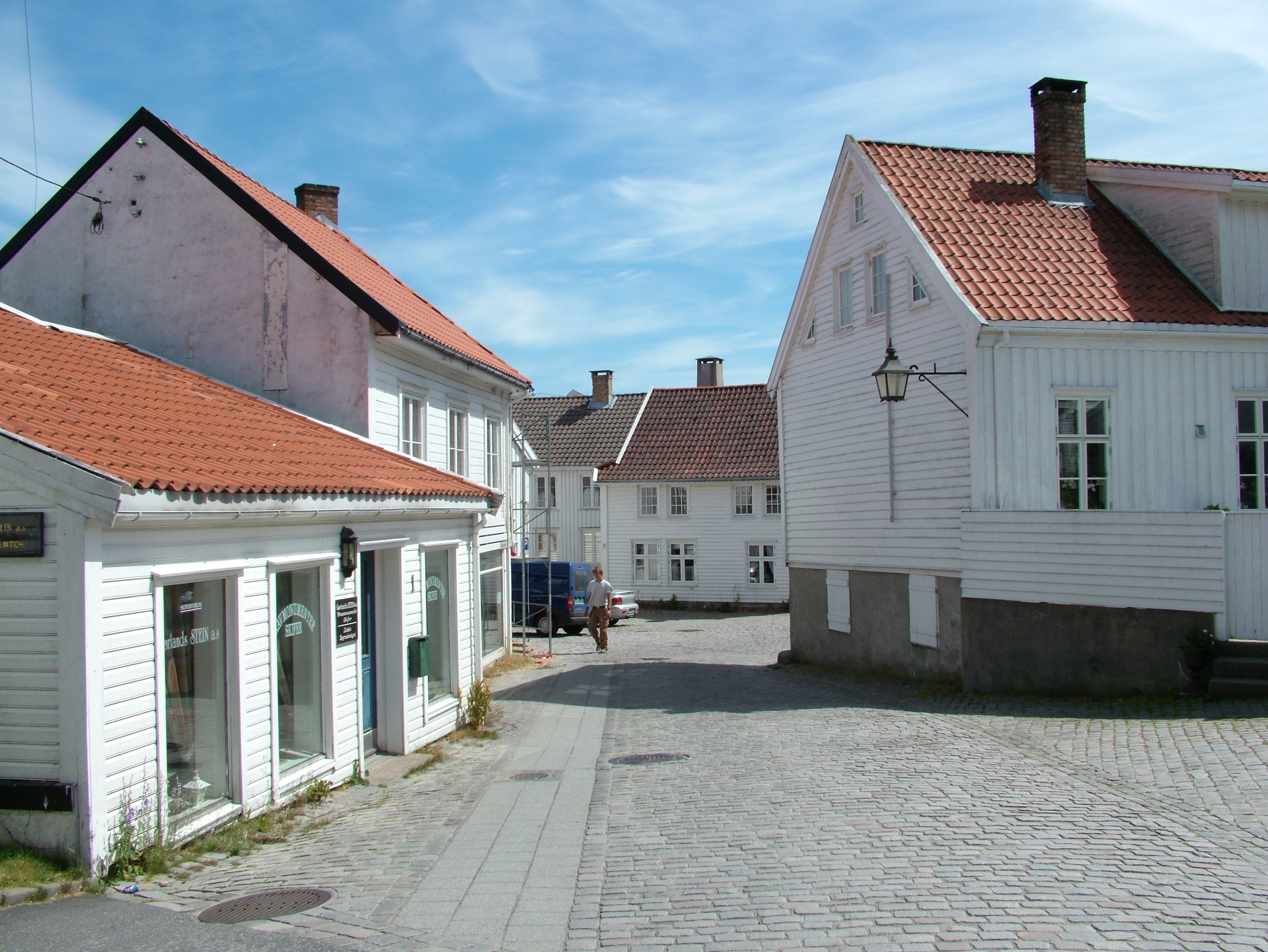
Part of Mandal town center

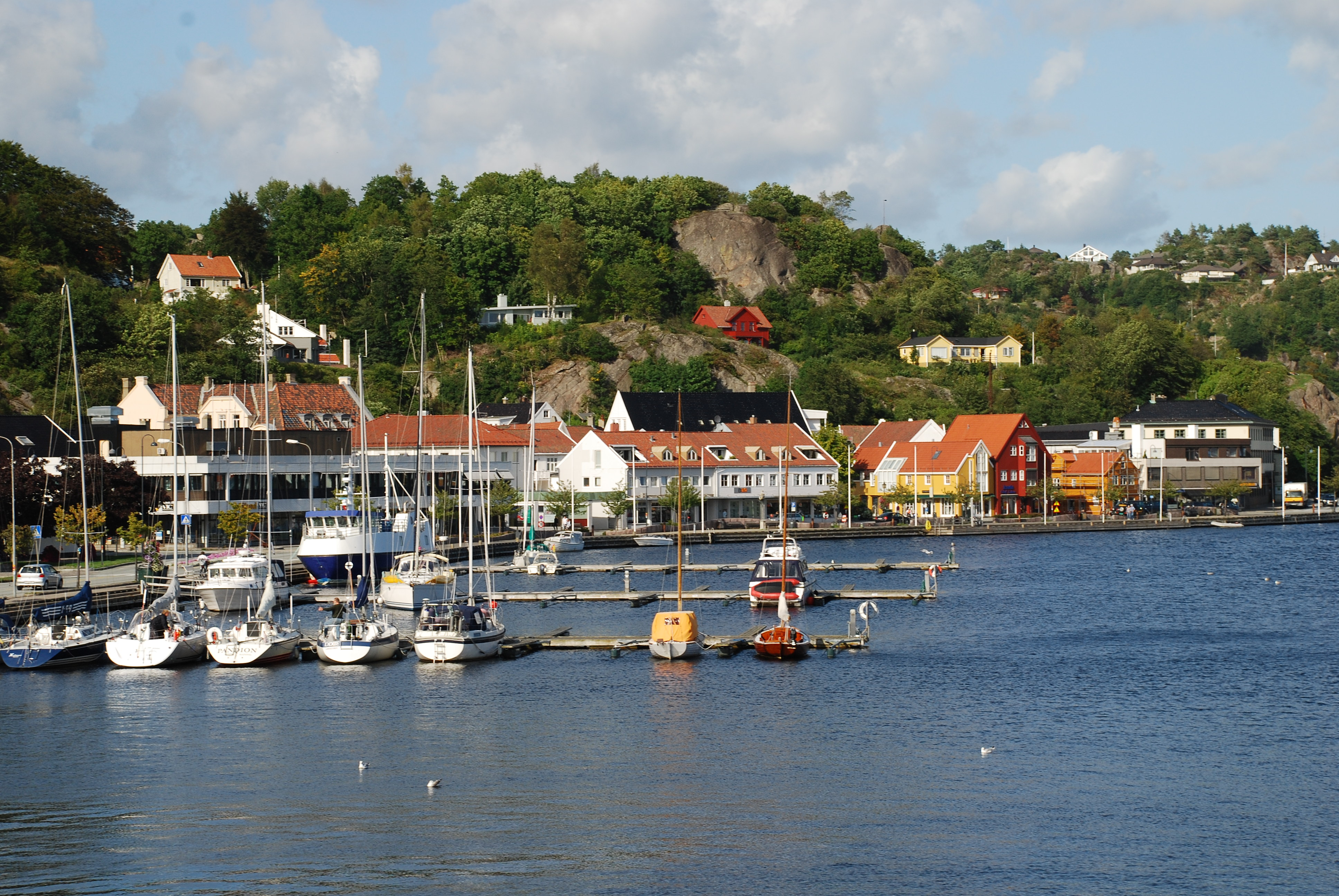
Marina in Mandal

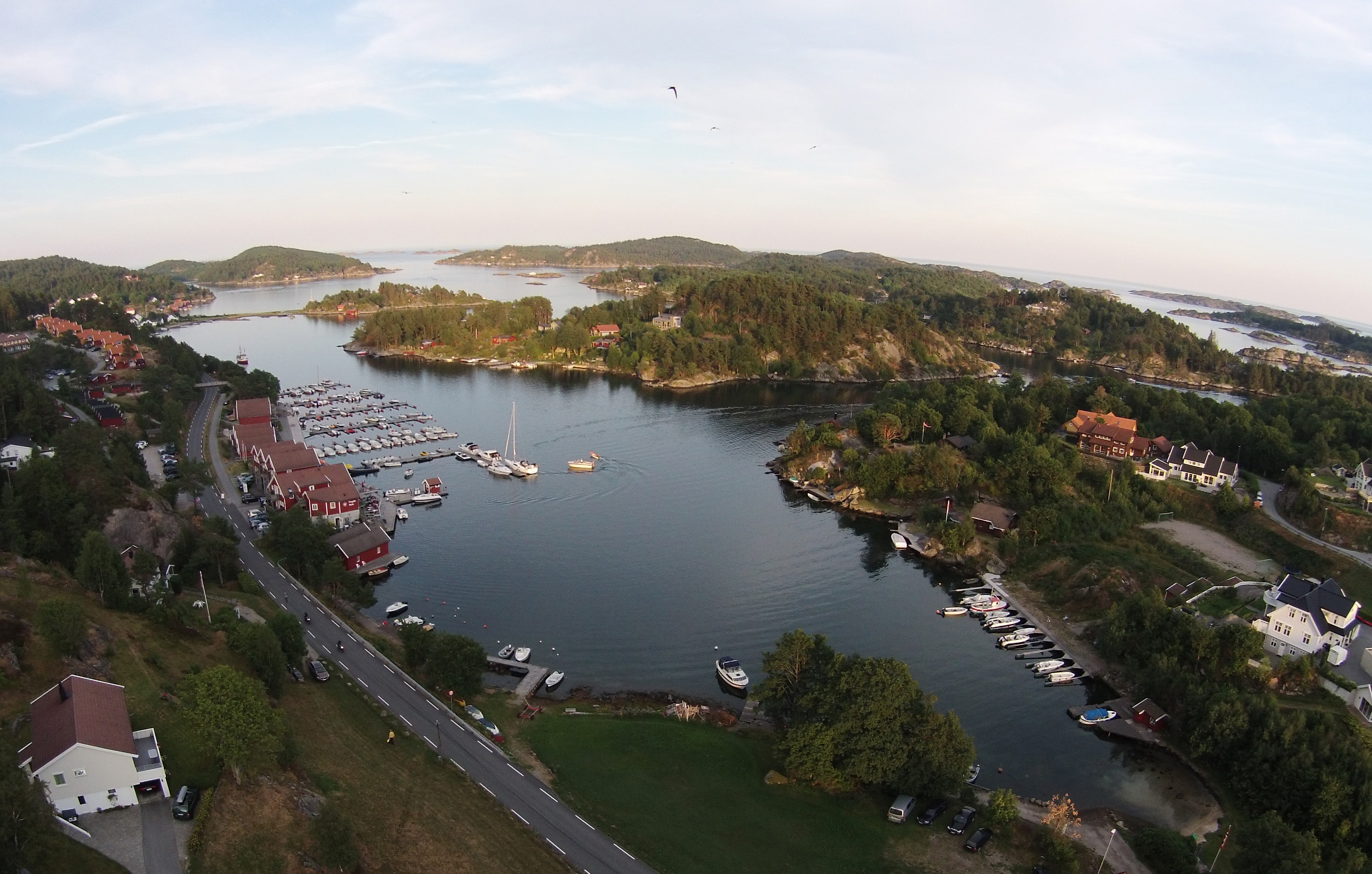
View of the Tregde area

The town of Mandal was established as a ladested municipality on 1 January 1838 (see formannskapsdistrikt law). On 1 July 1921, a part of the neighboring Halse og Harkmark Municipality that was adjacent to the town of Mandal (population: 221) transferred into the town of Mandal.

During the 1960s, there were many municipal mergers across Norway due to the work of the Schei Committee. On 1 January 1964, Mandal was significantly enlarged when the following areas were merged to form a much larger Mandal Municipality:

- the town of Mandal (population: 5,446)
- all of Halse og Harkmark Municipality (population: 3,676)
- most of Holum Municipality (population: 1,127), except for the Stubstadområdet which became part of Søgne Municipality

On 1 January 1965, the unpopulated Svalemyren area of Mandal Municipality was transferred to the neighboring Søgne Municipality.

On 1 January 2020, another major municipal merger took place when the following areas were merged to form a much larger Lindesnes Municipality with its administrative centre being the town of Mandal.

- all of Mandal Municipality (population: 15,659)
- all of Marnardal Municipality (population: 2,309)
- all of Lindesnes Municipality (population: 4,953)

=== Name ===
The municipality is named after the town of Mandal (Old Norse: Marnardalr), which in turn is named after the Mandalen river valley in which it is located. The first element is the genitive case of the river name Mǫrn which is now called Mandalselva. The meaning of this old river name is uncertain, but it may be derived from the word marr which means "sea". The last element is dalr which means "valley" or "dale".

Prior to 1653, the town of Mandal was named Vesterrisør (lit. 'western Risør'). The name was originally referring to the island Risøya outside the town, and the first element was added in the 16th century to distinguish it from the town of Østerrisør (meaning "eastern Risør"), which is now simply called Risør.

=== Coat of arms ===
The coat of arms was granted on 2 July 1921, just after Mandal became a town, and it was in use until 1 January 2020 when the municipality was dissolved. The official blazon is "Azure, three salmon naiant argent" (Norwegian: I blått tre hvite lakser, 1-1-1). This means the arms have a blue field (background) and the charge is three salmon shown swimming horizontally and stacked vertically. The salmon have a tincture of argent which means they are commonly colored white, but if the arms are made out of metal, then silver is used. The blue color in the field and the salmon were chosen to symbolize the importance of salmon fishing on the river Mandalselva. Mandal is the southernmost municipality in Norway that has a large salmon population, so therefore, salmon fishing also played a major role in the economic development of the village and its trade with the rest of southern Norway. The municipality usually added a mural crown to the top of the arms to show that the municipality included the town of Mandal. The arms were designed by Hallvard Trætteberg. The municipal flag has the same design as the coat of arms.

=== Churches ===
The Church of Norway has two parishes (sokn) within Mandal Municipality. It is part of the Mandal prosti (deanery) in the Diocese of Agder og Telemark.

Churches in Mandal Municipality
Parish (sokn)	Church name	Location of the church	Year built
Holum	Holum Church	Krossen	1825
Mandal	Harkmark Church	Harkmark	1613
Mandal	Mandal Church	Mandal	1821

== Government ==
While it existed, Mandal Municipality was responsible for primary education (through 10th grade), outpatient health services, senior citizen services, welfare and other social services, zoning, economic development, and municipal roads and utilities. The municipality was governed by a municipal council of directly elected representatives. The mayor was indirectly elected by a vote of the municipal council. The municipality was under the jurisdiction of the Kristiansand District Court and the Agder Court of Appeal.

=== Municipal council ===
The municipal council (Kommunestyre) of Mandal Municipality was made up of 35 representatives that were elected to four year terms. The tables below show the historical composition of the council by political party.

Mandal kommunestyre 2015–2019
Party name (in Norwegian)	Number of representatives
Labour Party (Arbeiderpartiet)	11
Progress Party (Fremskrittspartiet)	8
Green Party (Miljøpartiet De Grønne)	1
Conservative Party (Høyre)	7
Christian Democratic Party (Kristelig Folkeparti)	4
Centre Party (Senterpartiet)	1
Socialist Left Party (Sosialistisk Venstreparti)	1
Liberal Party (Venstre)	2
Total number of members:	35
Note: On 1 January 2020, Mandal Municipality became part of Lindesnes Municipality.

Mandal kommunestyre 2011–2015
Party name (in Norwegian)	Number of representatives
Labour Party (Arbeiderpartiet)	9
Progress Party (Fremskrittspartiet)	10
Green Party (Miljøpartiet De Grønne)	1
Conservative Party (Høyre)	6
Christian Democratic Party (Kristelig Folkeparti)	5
Centre Party (Senterpartiet)	1
Socialist Left Party (Sosialistisk Venstreparti)	1
Liberal Party (Venstre)	2
Total number of members:	35

Mandal kommunestyre 2007–2011
Party name (in Norwegian)	Number of representatives
Labour Party (Arbeiderpartiet)	8
Progress Party (Fremskrittspartiet)	11
Conservative Party (Høyre)	5
Christian Democratic Party (Kristelig Folkeparti)	7
Centre Party (Senterpartiet)	1
Socialist Left Party (Sosialistisk Venstreparti)	2
Liberal Party (Venstre)	1
Total number of members:	35

Mandal kommunestyre 2003–2007
Party name (in Norwegian)	Number of representatives
Labour Party (Arbeiderpartiet)	8
Progress Party (Fremskrittspartiet)	10
Conservative Party (Høyre)	6
Christian Democratic Party (Kristelig Folkeparti)	6
Centre Party (Senterpartiet)	1
Socialist Left Party (Sosialistisk Venstreparti)	3
Liberal Party (Venstre)	1
Total number of members:	35

Mandal kommunestyre 1999–2003
Party name (in Norwegian)	Number of representatives
Labour Party (Arbeiderpartiet)	9
Progress Party (Fremskrittspartiet)	8
Conservative Party (Høyre)	11
Christian Democratic Party (Kristelig Folkeparti)	9
Pensioners' Party (Pensjonistpartiet)	1
Centre Party (Senterpartiet)	2
Socialist Left Party (Sosialistisk Venstreparti)	2
Liberal Party (Venstre)	3
Total number of members:	45

Mandal kommunestyre 1995–1999
Party name (in Norwegian)	Number of representatives
Labour Party (Arbeiderpartiet)	10
Progress Party (Fremskrittspartiet)	5
Conservative Party (Høyre)	11
Christian Democratic Party (Kristelig Folkeparti)	8
Pensioners' Party (Pensjonistpartiet)	2
Centre Party (Senterpartiet)	4
Socialist Left Party (Sosialistisk Venstreparti)	2
Liberal Party (Venstre)	3
Total number of members:	45

Mandal kommunestyre 1991–1995
Party name (in Norwegian)	Number of representatives
Labour Party (Arbeiderpartiet)	8
Progress Party (Fremskrittspartiet)	6
Conservative Party (Høyre)	10
Christian Democratic Party (Kristelig Folkeparti)	7
Pensioners' Party (Pensjonistpartiet)	3
Centre Party (Senterpartiet)	4
Socialist Left Party (Sosialistisk Venstreparti)	4
Liberal Party (Venstre)	3
Total number of members:	45

Mandal kommunestyre 1987–1991
Party name (in Norwegian)	Number of representatives
Labour Party (Arbeiderpartiet)	10
Progress Party (Fremskrittspartiet)	7
Conservative Party (Høyre)	9
Christian Democratic Party (Kristelig Folkeparti)	9
Centre Party (Senterpartiet)	3
Socialist Left Party (Sosialistisk Venstreparti)	2
Liberal Party (Venstre)	5
Total number of members:	45

Mandal kommunestyre 1983–1987
Party name (in Norwegian)	Number of representatives
Labour Party (Arbeiderpartiet)	13
Conservative Party (Høyre)	14
Christian Democratic Party (Kristelig Folkeparti)	9
Centre Party (Senterpartiet)	4
Socialist Left Party (Sosialistisk Venstreparti)	2
Liberal Party (Venstre)	3
Total number of members:	45

Mandal kommunestyre 1979–1983
Party name (in Norwegian)	Number of representatives
Labour Party (Arbeiderpartiet)	10
Conservative Party (Høyre)	15
Christian Democratic Party (Kristelig Folkeparti)	7
New People's Party (Nye Folkepartiet)	1
Centre Party (Senterpartiet)	4
Socialist Left Party (Sosialistisk Venstreparti)	2
Liberal Party (Venstre)	4
Cross-party list (Tverrpolitisk liste)	2
Total number of members:	45

Mandal kommunestyre 1975–1979
Party name (in Norwegian)	Number of representatives
Labour Party (Arbeiderpartiet)	11
Conservative Party (Høyre)	10
Christian Democratic Party (Kristelig Folkeparti)	8
New People's Party (Nye Folkepartiet)	4
Centre Party (Senterpartiet)	5
Socialist Left Party (Sosialistisk Venstreparti)	2
Liberal Party (Venstre)	2
Cross-party list (Tverrpolitisk Liste)	3
Total number of members:	45

Mandal kommunestyre 1971–1975
Party name (in Norwegian)	Number of representatives
Labour Party (Arbeiderpartiet)	13
Conservative Party (Høyre)	7
Christian Democratic Party (Kristelig Folkeparti)	5
Centre Party (Senterpartiet)	4
Socialist People's Party (Sosialistisk Folkeparti)	2
Liberal Party (Venstre)	9
Local List(s) (Lokale lister)	5
Total number of members:	45

Mandal kommunestyre 1967–1971
Party name (in Norwegian)	Number of representatives
Labour Party (Arbeiderpartiet)	14
Conservative Party (Høyre)	8
Christian Democratic Party (Kristelig Folkeparti)	4
Centre Party (Senterpartiet)	5
Socialist People's Party (Sosialistisk Folkeparti)	2
Liberal Party (Venstre)	12
Total number of members:	45

Mandal kommunestyre 1963–1967
Party name (in Norwegian)	Number of representatives
Labour Party (Arbeiderpartiet)	14
Conservative Party (Høyre)	8
Christian Democratic Party (Kristelig Folkeparti)	3
Centre Party (Senterpartiet)	5
Socialist People's Party (Sosialistisk Folkeparti)	1
Liberal Party (Venstre)	14
Total number of members:	45

Mandal bystyre 1959–1963
Party name (in Norwegian)	Number of representatives
Labour Party (Arbeiderpartiet)	9
Conservative Party (Høyre)	7
Christian Democratic Party (Kristelig Folkeparti)	3
Liberal Party (Venstre)	10
Total number of members:	29

Mandal bystyre 1955–1959
Party name (in Norwegian)	Number of representatives
Labour Party (Arbeiderpartiet)	11
Conservative Party (Høyre)	7
Communist Party (Kommunistiske Parti)	1
Christian Democratic Party (Kristelig Folkeparti)	2
Liberal Party (Venstre)	8
Total number of members:	29

Mandal bystyre 1951–1955
Party name (in Norwegian)	Number of representatives
Labour Party (Arbeiderpartiet)	9
Conservative Party (Høyre)	7
Communist Party (Kommunistiske Parti)	1
Christian Democratic Party (Kristelig Folkeparti)	2
Liberal Party (Venstre)	7
Local List(s) (Lokale lister)	2
Total number of members:	28

Mandal bystyre 1947–1951
Party name (in Norwegian)	Number of representatives
Labour Party (Arbeiderpartiet)	9
Conservative Party (Høyre)	7
Communist Party (Kommunistiske Parti)	2
Christian Democratic Party (Kristelig Folkeparti)	1
Joint list of the Liberal Party (Venstre) and the Radical People's Party (Radikale Folkepartiet)	7
Local List(s) (Lokale lister)	2
Total number of members:	28

Mandal bystyre 1945–1947
Party name (in Norwegian)	Number of representatives
Labour Party (Arbeiderpartiet)	8
Conservative Party (Høyre)	5
Communist Party (Kommunistiske Parti)	3
Christian Democratic Party (Kristelig Folkeparti)	3
Joint list of the Liberal Party (Venstre) and the Radical People's Party (Radikale Folkepartiet)	6
Local List(s) (Lokale lister)	3
Total number of members:	28

Mandal bystyre 1937–1940*
Party name (in Norwegian)	Number of representatives
Labour Party (Arbeiderpartiet)	8
Temperance Party (Avholdspartiet)	7
Liberal Party (Venstre)	6
Joint list of the Conservative Party (Høyre) and the Free-minded People's Party (Frisinnede Folkeparti)	7
Total number of members:	28
Note: Due to the German occupation of Norway during World War II, no elections were held for new municipal councils until after the war ended in 1945.

Mandal bystyre 1934–1937
Party name (in Norwegian)	Number of representatives
Labour Party (Arbeiderpartiet)	8
Temperance Party (Avholdspartiet)	6
Liberal Party (Venstre)	7
Joint list of the Conservative Party (Høyre) and the Free-minded People's Party (Frisinnede Folkeparti)	7
Total number of members:	28

Mandal bystyre 1931–1934
Party name (in Norwegian)	Number of representatives
Labour Party (Arbeiderpartiet)	7
Temperance Party (Avholdspartiet)	6
Liberal Party (Venstre)	7
Joint list of the Conservative Party (Høyre) and the Free-minded People's Party (Frisinnede Folkeparti)	8
Total number of members:	28

Mandal bystyre 1928–1931
Party name (in Norwegian)	Number of representatives
Labour Party (Arbeiderpartiet)	6
Temperance Party (Avholdspartiet)	8
Liberal Party (Venstre)	5
Joint list of the Conservative Party (Høyre) and the Free-minded Liberal Party (Frisinnede Venstre)	9
Total number of members:	28

Mandal bystyre 1925–1928
Party name (in Norwegian)	Number of representatives
Labour Party (Arbeiderpartiet)	5
Temperance Party (Avholdspartiet)	6
Conservative Party (Høyre)	8
Social Democratic Labour Party (Socialdemokratiske Arbeiderparti)	2
Liberal Party (Venstre)	4
Local List(s) (Lokale lister)	3
Total number of members:	28

Mandal bystyre 1922–1925
Party name (in Norwegian)	Number of representatives
Labour Party (Arbeiderpartiet)	6
Temperance Party (Avholdspartiet)	7
Social Democratic Labour Party (Socialdemokratiske Arbeiderparti)	1
Liberal Party (Venstre)	5
Joint list of the Conservative Party (Høyre) and the Free-minded Liberal Party (Frisinnede Venstre)	9
Total number of members:	28

Mandal bystyre 1919–1922
Party name (in Norwegian)	Number of representatives
Labour Party (Arbeiderpartiet)	6
Liberal Party (Venstre)	10
Joint list of the Conservative Party (Høyre) and the Free-minded Liberal Party (Frisinnede Venstre)	10
Local List(s) (Lokale lister)	2
Total number of members:	28

=== Mayors ===
The mayor (Norwegian: ordfører) of Mandal Municipality was the political leader of the municipality and the chairperson of the municipal council. The following people have held this position:

- 1838–1838: Anton Henrik Scheel
- 1839–1841: Johan Malthe Hübert
- 1842–1842: Hans Peter Erichsen
- 1843–1843: Gulow Andorsen
- 1844–1844: Niels Nielsen Vogt
- 1845–1846: Gulow Andorsen
- 1847–1847: Niels Nielsen Vogt
- 1847–1847: Daniel Peter Christian Isaachsen
- 1848–1852: Ole Andreas Ohlsen
- 1853–1854: Niels Nielsen Vogt
- 1855–1855: Svennik Svensen
- 1856–1856: Thomas Madsen
- 1857–1857: Carl Emil Salvesen
- 1858–1858: Albert Jacobsen
- 1859–1859: Edvard Hieronimus Bassøe Wattne
- 1860–1860: Jens Henrik Beer Gundersen
- 1861–1862: Svennik Svensen
- 1863–1867: Lauritz Jacobsen
- 1868–1868: Jens Henrik Beer Gundersen
- 1869–1879: Lauritz Jacobsen
- 1879–1880: Jens Henrik Beer Gundersen
- 1881–1881: Hans Peter Rude
- 1882–1888: Gabriel Egidius Johan Henrik Sem
- 1889–1891: Hjalmar Selmer
- 1892–1892: Johan Fredrik Ekholm Reymert
- 1893–1899: Jens Kraft
- 1900–1900: Jørgen Peter Jørgensen
- 1901–1901: Adolf Paludan Ulriksen
- 1902–1904: Jørgen Peter Jørgensen
- 1905–1907: Torkild Tonstad
- 1908–1916: Christen Andreas Christensen
- 1917–1919: Kristen Schmidt
- 1920–1922: Christen Andreas Christensen
- 1923–1928: Marcus Halfdan Kastrud
- 1929–1931: Hans Peter Tallaksen
- 1932–1937: Marcus Halfdan Kastrud
- 1938–1940: Johan Birger Pedersen
- 1945–1945: Johan Birger Pedersen
- 1946–1946: Arne Syrdahl (Ap)
- 1947–1947: Viktor Nygaard
- 1948–1951: Jørgen Ørbech Bugge
- 1952–1954: Viktor Nygaard
- 1955–1955: Olav Gundersen
- 1956–1957: Viktor Nygaard
- 1959–1959: Herman Gulowsen
- 1960–1963: Olav Gundersen
- 1964–1969: Olav Håland
- 1970–1971: Kjell Gase Nygaard (H)
- 1972–1975: Ludvig Hope Faye (H)
- 1976–1979: Guttorm Ihme (H)
- 1980–1991: Knut Lindseth (KrF)
- 1992–2003: Kirsten Huser Leschbrandt (H)
- 2003–2007: Åse Lill Kimestad (Ap)
- 2007–2011: Alf Godtfred Møll (FrP)
- 2011–2015: Tore Askildsen (KrF)
- 2015–2019: Alf Erik Andersen (FrP)

== Geography ==
Mandal was the southernmost municipality in all of Norway, with the tiny skerry of Pysen being the southernmost point of land in Norway proper.

Mandal Municipality bordered the North Sea to the south, Lindesnes Municipality to the west and northwest, Marnardal Municipality to the north, and Søgne Municipality to the east. The municipality included many islands and skerries along the coast including Hille, Pysen, Skjernøya, and Skogsøy. The Hatholmen Lighthouse and Ryvingen Lighthouse marked the sides of the Mannefjorden which leads north into the town of Mandal. The majority of the municipality was located in the southern Mandalen valley which follows the river Mandalselva. The highest point in the municipality was the 315.5-metre (1,035 ft) tall mountain Svolheia.

=== Climate ===
Mandal had an oceanic climate (Cfb) with short, cool summers and long, moderately cold and wet winters.

Climate data for Mandal
Month	Jan	Feb	Mar	Apr	May	Jun	Jul	Aug	Sep	Oct	Nov	Dec	Year
Mean daily maximum °C (°F)	1.3 (34.3)	1.4 (34.5)	3.5 (38.3)	7.8 (46.0)	12.9 (55.2)	16.9 (62.4)	18.1 (64.6)	17.5 (63.5)	13.9 (57.0)	10.1 (50.2)	5.7 (42.3)	3.9 (39.0)	9.3 (48.7)
Daily mean °C (°F)	−0.5 (31.1)	−0.8 (30.6)	1.2 (34.2)	4.6 (40.3)	9.6 (49.3)	13.4 (56.1)	14.8 (58.6)	14.4 (57.9)	11.2 (52.2)	8.0 (46.4)	3.8 (38.8)	1.1 (34.0)	6.7 (44.1)
Mean daily minimum °C (°F)	−2.6 (27.3)	−2.9 (26.8)	−1.0 (30.2)	1.8 (35.2)	6.4 (43.5)	9.9 (49.8)	11.4 (52.5)	11.3 (52.3)	8.7 (47.7)	5.9 (42.6)	1.7 (35.1)	−1.0 (30.2)	4.1 (39.4)
Average precipitation mm (inches)	152 (6.0)	99 (3.9)	111 (4.4)	72 (2.8)	92 (3.6)	86 (3.4)	98 (3.9)	135 (5.3)	166 (6.5)	190 (7.5)	187 (7.4)	146 (5.7)	1,534 (60.4)
Average precipitation days (≥ 1 mm)	15.8	11.1	12.6	9.7	10.3	9.7	9.6	11.9	14.4	15.7	17.5	15.2	153.5
Source: Norwegian Meteorological Institute

== Attractions ==
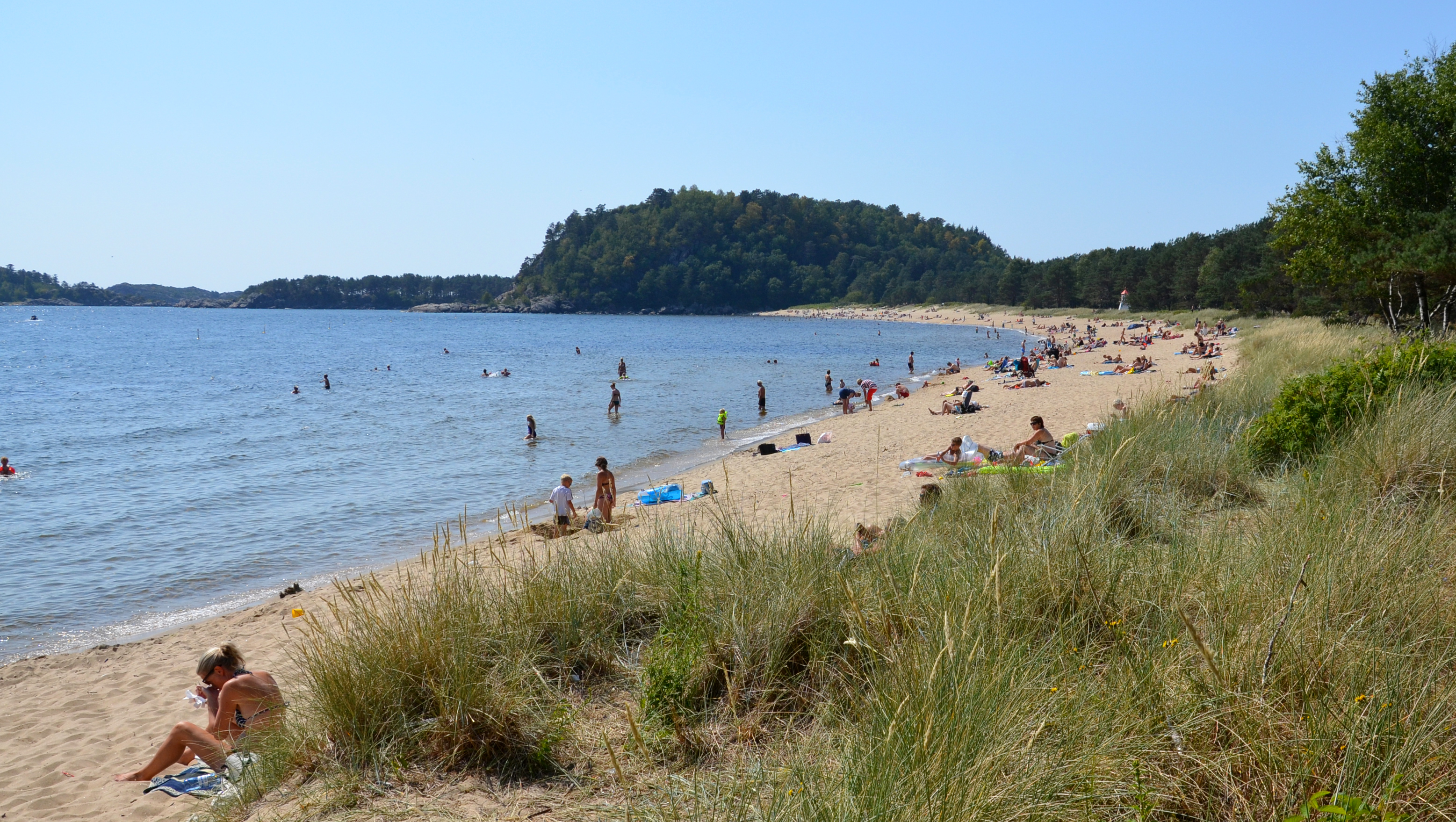
Sjøsanden a warm summer day.

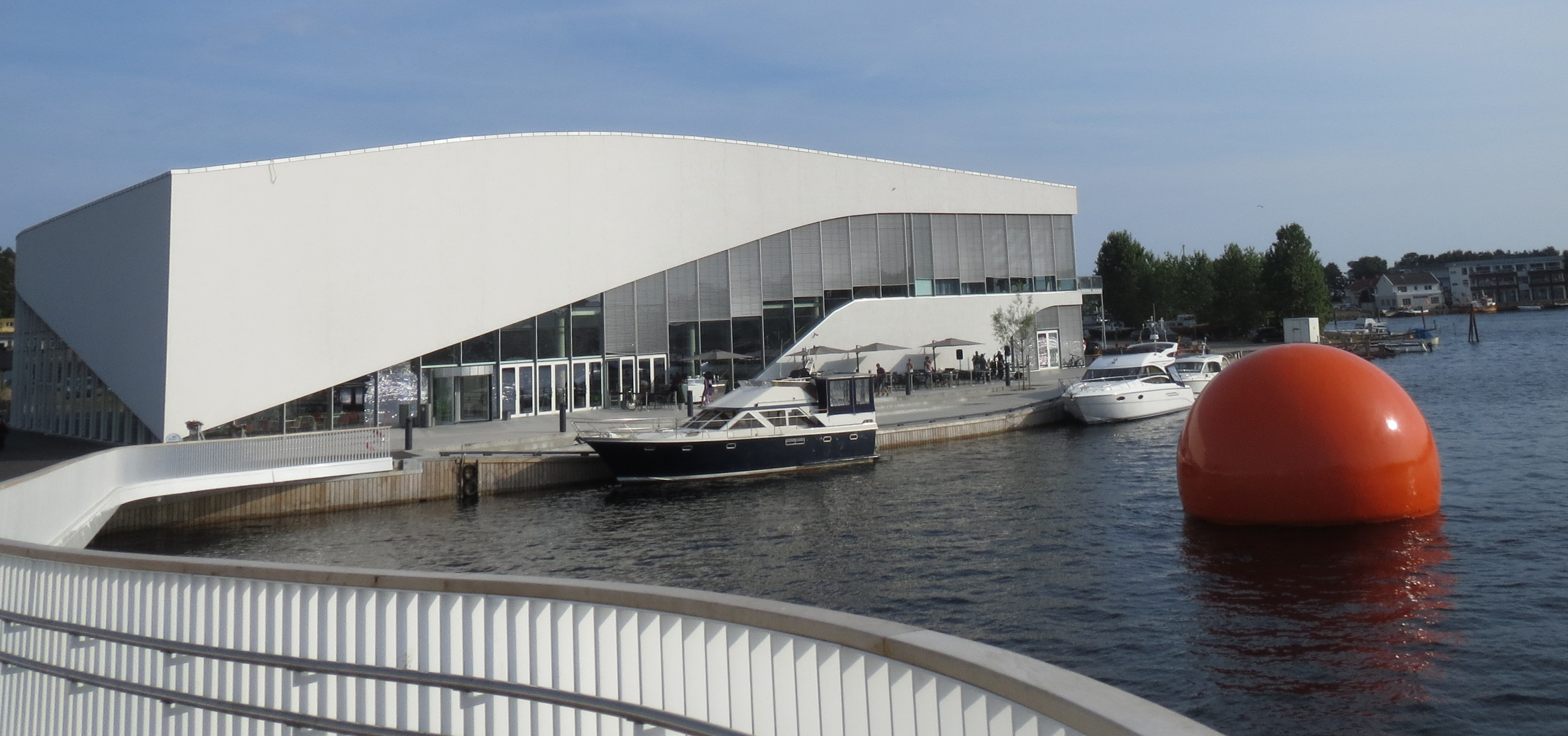
Buen

Mandal Municipality was a very popular holiday tourism location, with its mild and refreshing summer climate. It was famous for its long-stretching beaches surrounding the town. Sjøsanden (lit. 'The Sea Sand') was the most famous beach in the municipality, as it stretches for almost a kilometre just outside the town centre. It is frequently ranked as one of Norway's most popular beaches.

The city center is known for its charming concentration of old, white, wooden houses and the Mandalselva river running through it. Another attraction is the city's church: Mandal Church. It is the largest wooden church in Norway, with 1,800 seats and a pulpit on the wall behind the altar. Also, the library, art gallery, cinema, concert hall, and theater is located in the Buen kulturhus (culture house) which was built in 2012.

The artists Gustav Vigeland, Adolph Tidemand, Amaldus Nielsen, and Olaf Isaachsen are all from Mandal, so the town is sometimes called "The Little Town with the Great Artists".

Hogganvik, in the Sånum-Lundevik area of Mandal, is the site of discovery of the Hogganvik runestone in 2009.

== Economy ==
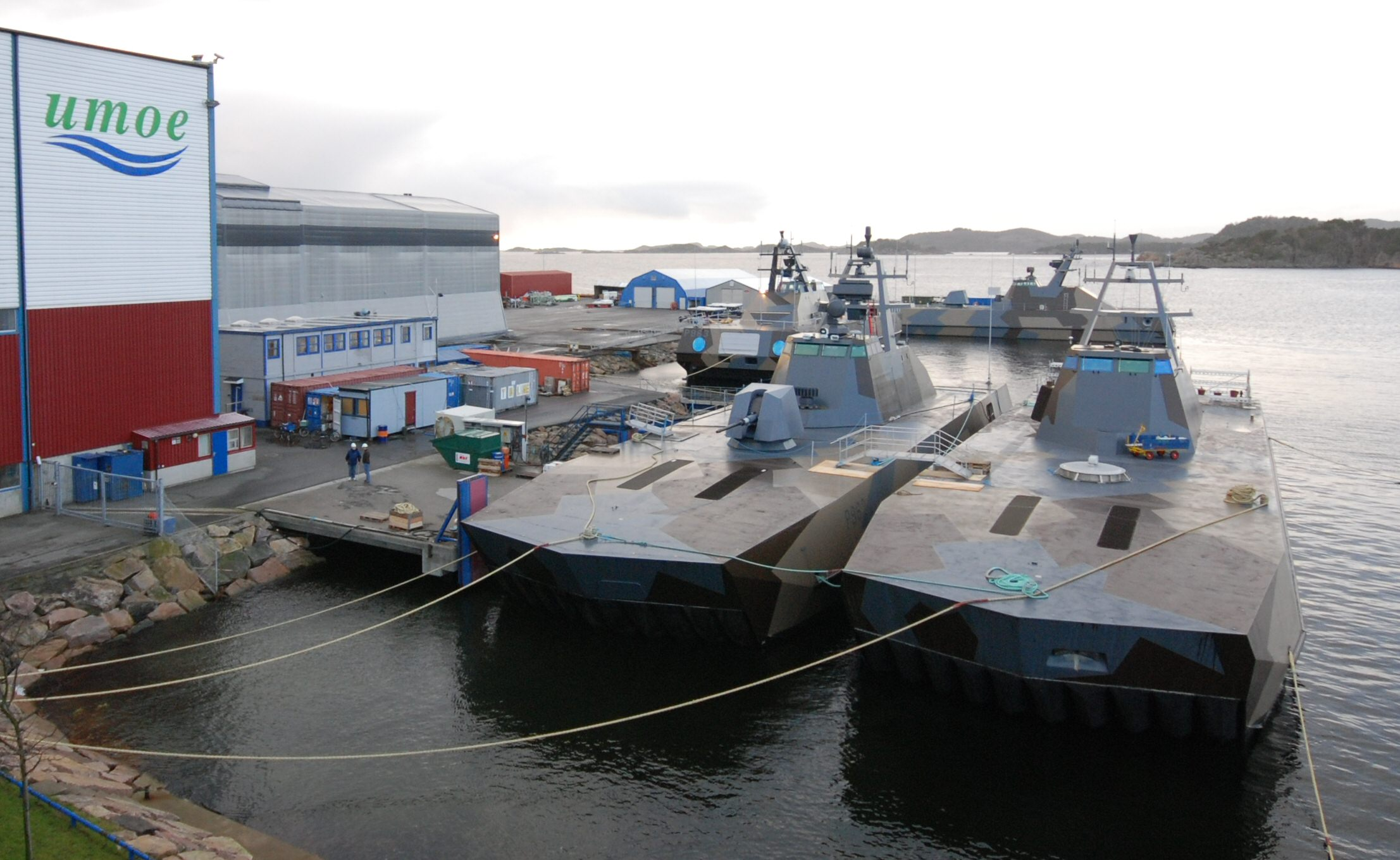
Umoe Mandal was the municipality's cornerstone, with the production of mostly military vessels, like these Skjold class patrol boats.

Mandal Municipality was notable for its shipbuilding and engineering industries. There was much trade in sailing ships, where the natural harbor of Kleven at Gismerøya was used. Large yard providing ships and marine equipment in Norway and abroad are Westermoen Hydrofoil and Båtservice yard at Skogfjorden, the later Umoe Mandal.

Moreover, the textile industry was also substantial, with several manufacturing companies that had at most 200-300 employees.

Mandal Municipality also was known for its annual Shellfish festival (Skalldyrfestivalen) the second weekend of August when many people gathered to eat Norwegian seafood.

== Twin towns – sister cities ==
Mandal had sister city agreements with the following places:

- Korsholm, Ostrobothnia, Finland
- Middelfart, Syddanmark, Denmark
- Oskarshamn, Kalmar, Sweden

== Notable people ==
- The sculptor Gustav Vigeland (1869–1943) was born in Mandal, and has a museum dedicated to him here. Vigeland's main achievement is the Vigeland Sculpture Park (Vigelandsparken) in Oslo.
- The painter Adolph Tidemand (1814–1876) was also born in Mandal. His most famous painting is the national romantic image of a traditional wedding on the Hardangerfjorden, which he made together with Hans Gude.

== See also ==
- Marquis of Mandal
