= Halse og Harkmark Municipality =

Former municipality in Vest-Agder, Norway

Halse og Harkmark Municipality Halse og Harkmark herad
- Former municipality
- Halsaa og Hartmark herred (historic name); Mandals landdistrikt (historic name)
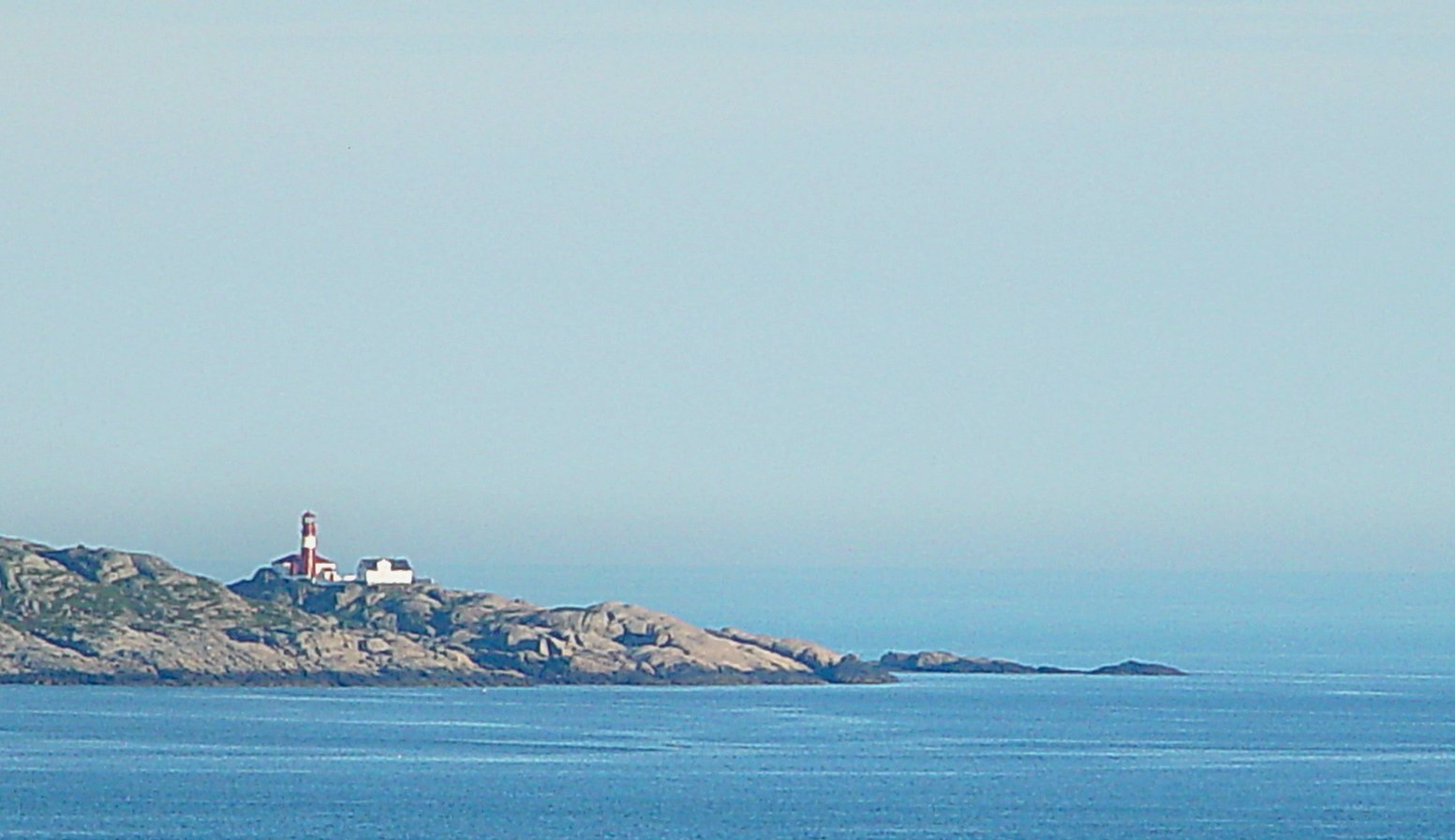
- View of Ryvingen Lighthouse in Halse

- Vest-Agder within Norway

- Halse og Harkmark within Vest-Agder
- Coordinates: 58°02′42″N 07°36′12″E
- Country: Norway
- County: Vest-Agder
- District: Sørlandet
- Established: 1 Jan 1838
  - Created as: Formannskapsdistrikt
- Disestablished: 1 Jan 2020
  - Succeeded by: Mandal Municipality
- Administrative centre: Halse

Government
  - Mayor (1957–1963): Karl Lian

Area (upon dissolution)
  - Total: 104.6 km^{2} (40.4 sq mi)
  - Rank: #509 in Norway
- Highest elevation: 211 m (692 ft)

Population (1963)
  - Total: 3,578
  - Rank: #251 in Norway
  - Density: 34.2/km^{2} (89/sq mi)
  - Change (10 years): ▲ +24.3%

Official language
  - Norwegian form: Nynorsk
- Time zone: UTC+01:00 (CET)
  - Summer (DST): UTC+02:00 (CEST)
- ISO 3166 code: NO-1019

Halse og Harkmark is a former municipality in the old Vest-Agder county, Norway. The 104.6-square-kilometre (40.4 sq mi) municipality existed from 1838 until its dissolution in 1964. The area is now part of Lindesnes Municipality in Agder county. The administrative centre of the municipality was the village of Halse, which at that time was a suburb of the town of Mandal in Mandal Municipality.

Prior to its dissolution in 1964, the 104.6-square-kilometre (40.4 sq mi) municipality was the 509th largest by area out of the 689 municipalities in Norway. Halse og Harkmark Municipality was the 251st most populous municipality in Norway with a population of about 3,578. The municipality's population density was 34.2 inhabitants per square kilometre (89/sq mi) and its population had increased by 24.3% over the previous 10-year period.

== General information ==
Mandals landdistrikt (lit. 'Mandal's country district'; later called 'Halse og Harkmark Municipality') was established as a municipality on 1 January 1838 (see formannskapsdistrikt law). It encompassed all the rural areas surrounding the town of Mandal. On 1 July 1921, a part of Halse og Harkmark Municipality (population: 221) was transferred into the town of Mandal.

During the 1960s, there were many municipal mergers across Norway due to the work of the Schei Committee. On 1 January 1964, Halse og Harkmark Municipality was dissolved and the following areas were merged to form an enlarged Mandal Municipality:

- all of Halse og Harkmark Municipality (population: 3,676)
- all of Mandal Municipality (population: 5,446)
- most of Holum Municipality (population: 1,127), except for the Stubstad and Svalemyr areas which became part of Søgne Municipality

=== Name ===
The two suburban parishes of Halsaa and Hartmark were merged in 1838 and the new, resulting municipality was given the name Mandals landdistrikt, meaning the "country district around Mandal". In 1865, it was decided to give the municipality its own name that was distinct from the neighboring town of Mandal. The municipality chose to use the compound name Halsaa og Hartmark, literally meaning "Halsaa and Hartmark" – the two parishes that made up the municipality. On 3 November 1917, a royal resolution changed the spelling of the name of the municipality to Halse og Harkmark.

The parish of Halsaa is named after the old Halsaa farm (Old Norse: Halshaugar) since the first Mandal Church was built there. The first element is hals which means "neck", referring to the piece of land between the Skogsfjorden and the river Mandalselva. The last element is haugr which means "burial mound" or "cairn". Over time, the pronunciation of the original name was compressed and abbreviated to simply Halsaa; in 1917, it was changed again to Halse to represent the local pronunciation of the name.

The parish of Hartmark is named after the old Hartmark farm (Old Norse: Harpmark or Harkmark) since the first Harkmark Church was built there. The meaning of the first element is uncertain. It is possibly derived from the old name of a local river. The name could possibly come from harpa which means "harp" or harr which is a norse name for the European grayling. Historically the first element has been written as Hart-, Harp, and Hark. This variation in spelling is likely due to a misunderstanding of the hearing of the name over time. It is uncertain which one was the original form, but it was likely either the "p" or "k" spelling that was original. The last element is derived from the genitive case of mǫrk which means "forest" or "woodland". The name was written Hartmark until 1917 when it was changed to Harkmark.

=== Churches ===
The Church of Norway had two parishes (sokn) within Halse og Harkmark Municipality. At the time of the municipal dissolution, it was part of the Mandal prestegjeld and the Mandal prosti (deanery) in the Diocese of Agder.

Churches in Halse og Harkmark Municipality
Parish (sokn)	Church name	Location of the church	Year built
Halse	Mandal Church*	Mandal	1821
Harkmark	Harkmark Church	Harkmark	1613
*Note: Mandal Church was located in the neighboring town of Mandal, but the church served both the town and the rural parish of Halse in Halse og Harkmark Municipality.

== Geography ==
The municipality of Halse og Harkmark encompassed the rural areas that surrounded the town of Mandal, including many islands such as Hille, Skjernøy, and Pysen (Norway's southernmost point). The municipality was located in the lower Mandalen valley, through which the river Mandalselva flows. The highest point in the municipality was the 211-metre (692 ft) tall mountain Haalandsfjeld (now spelled Hålandsfjell). Holum Municipality was located to the north, Søgne Municipality was located to the east, the Skagerrak strait was located to the south, and Sør-Audnedal Municipality was located to the west.

== Government ==
While it existed, Halse og Harkmark Municipality was responsible for primary education (through 10th grade), outpatient health services, senior citizen services, welfare and other social services, zoning, economic development, and municipal roads and utilities. The municipality was governed by a municipal council of directly elected representatives. The mayor was indirectly elected by a vote of the municipal council. The municipality was under the jurisdiction of the Mandal District Court and the Agder Court of Appeal.

=== Municipal council ===
The municipal council (Heradsstyre) of Halse og Harkmark Municipality was made up of representatives that were elected to four year terms. The tables below show the historical composition of the council by political party.

Halse og Harkmark heradsstyre 1959–1963
Party name (in Nynorsk)	Number of representatives
Labour Party (Arbeidarpartiet)	5
Conservative Party (Høgre)	3
Christian Democratic Party (Kristeleg Folkeparti)	2
Centre Party (Senterpartiet)	4
Liberal Party (Venstre)	7
Total number of members:	21
Note: On 1 January 1964, Halse og Harkmark Municipality became part of Mandal Municipality.

Halse og Harkmark heradsstyre 1955–1959
Party name (in Nynorsk)	Number of representatives
Labour Party (Arbeidarpartiet)	4
Conservative Party (Høgre)	3
Christian Democratic Party (Kristeleg Folkeparti)	2
Farmers' Party (Bondepartiet)	4
Liberal Party (Venstre)	5
Local List(s) (Lokale lister)	3
Total number of members:	21

Halse og Harkmark heradsstyre 1951–1955
Party name (in Nynorsk)	Number of representatives
Labour Party (Arbeidarpartiet)	5
Conservative Party (Høgre)	3
Christian Democratic Party (Kristeleg Folkeparti)	2
Farmers' Party (Bondepartiet)	6
Liberal Party (Venstre)	9
Local List(s) (Lokale lister)	3
Total number of members:	28

Halse og Harkmark heradsstyre 1947–1951
Party name (in Nynorsk)	Number of representatives
Labour Party (Arbeidarpartiet)	4
Conservative Party (Høgre)	4
Farmers' Party (Bondepartiet)	7
Liberal Party (Venstre)	9
Local List(s) (Lokale lister)	4
Total number of members:	28

Halse og Harkmark heradsstyre 1945–1947
Party name (in Nynorsk)	Number of representatives
Labour Party (Arbeidarpartiet)	4
Local List(s) (Lokale lister)	24
Total number of members:	28

Halse og Harkmark heradsstyre 1937–1941*
Party name (in Nynorsk)	Number of representatives
Labour Party (Arbeidarpartiet)	3
Conservative Party (Høgre)	4
Farmers' Party (Bondepartiet)	6
Liberal Party (Venstre)	8
Joint List(s) of Non-Socialist Parties (Borgarlege Felleslister)	7
Total number of members:	28
Note: Due to the German occupation of Norway during World War II, no elections were held for new municipal councils until after the war ended in 1945.

=== Mayors ===
The mayor (Nynorsk: ordførar) of Halse og Harkmark Municipality was the political leader of the municipality and the chairperson of the municipal council. The following people have held this position:

- 1838–1839: John Aanensen Nodeland
- 1839–1841: Casper Jørgensen Frostestad
- 1841–1852: Søren Pedersen Jaabæk
- 1852–1855: Kristian Olsen Berge
- 1856–1857: Fredrik Olsen Berge
- 1858–1866: Ole Eriksen Jaabæk
- 1866–1885: Søren Pedersen Jaabæk
- 1885–1887: Knut Finsdahl
- 1888–1891: Bent Sørensen
- 1892–1895: Knut Finsdahl
- 1896–1898: Bent Sørensen
- 1899–1904: Lauritz Nielsen
- 1905–1913: Bent Sørensen
- 1914–1925: Bent Løwdahl
- 1926–1933: Bent Ormestad
- 1933–1934: Reinert Spetteland
- 1934–1937: Søren A. Bentsen
- 1938–1941: Torgeir Haugen
- 1941–1945: Otto Johnsen Nodeland (NS)
- 1945–1945: Torgeir Haugen
- 1946–1946: Håkon Jåbekk
- 1946–1957: Olaf Brunvathne
- 1957–1963: Karl Lian

== See also ==
- List of former municipalities of Norway
