= Åse Lill Kimestad =

Norwegian politician (born 1955)

Åse Lill Kimestad (born 16 August 1955) is a Norwegian politician for the Labour Party.

She served as a deputy representative to the Norwegian Parliament from Vest-Agder during the terms 1989–1993, 1993–1997 and 2001–2005.

On the local level, Kimestad became the mayor of Mandal municipality in a direct election in 2003. She lost her position following the 2007 elections.
