= Hille, Agder =

Island in Agder, Norway

Hille
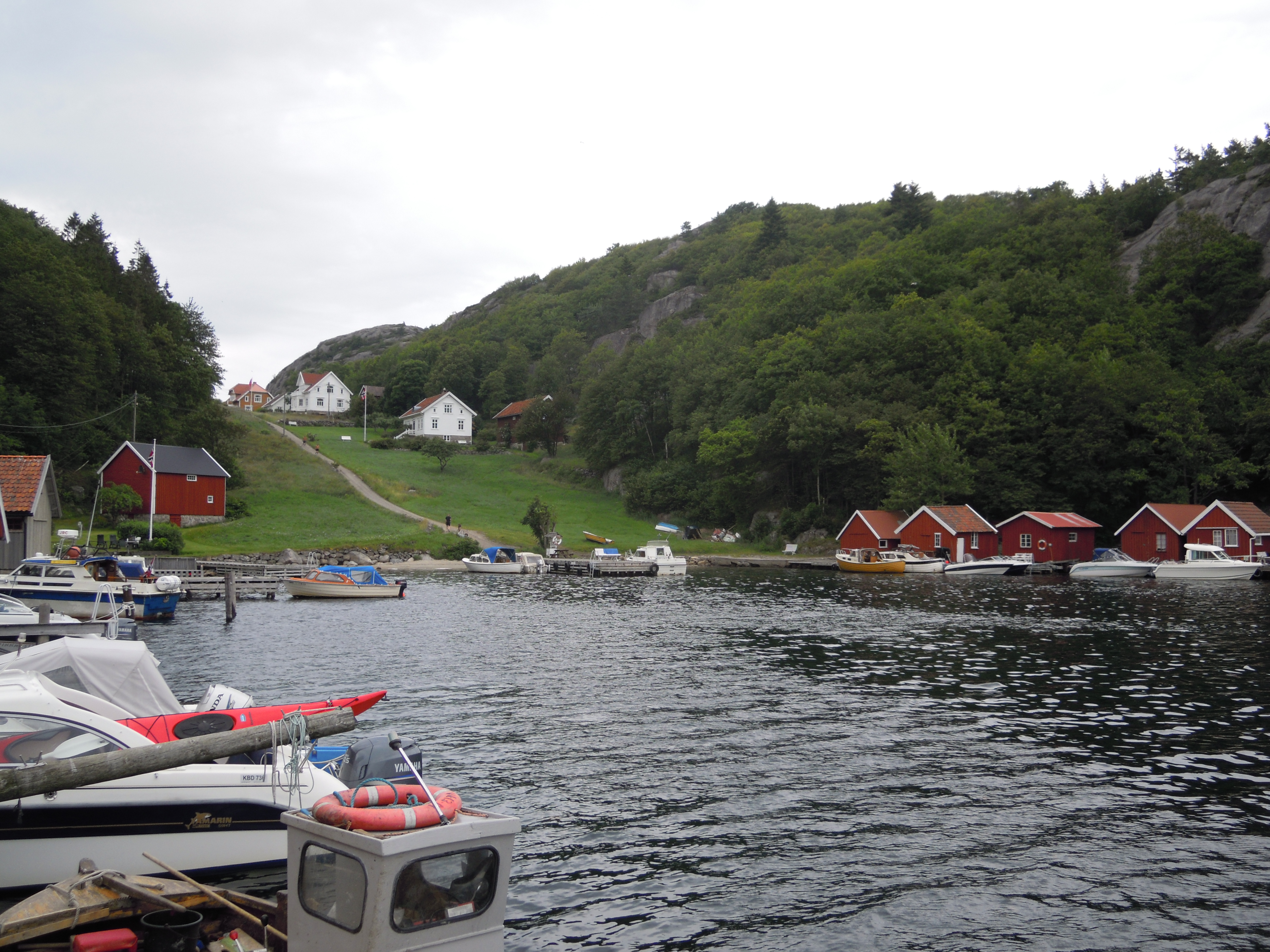
- Interactive map of the island

Geography
- Location: Agder, Norway
- Coordinates: 58.00346°N 7.35626°E
- Area: 4.2 km^{2} (1.6 sq mi)
- Length: 4.3 km (2.67 mi)
- Width: 3 km (1.9 mi)
- Highest elevation: 96 m (315 ft)
- Highest point: Garpeheia

Administration
- Norway
- County: Agder
- Municipality: Lindesnes Municipality

Hille is an island in Lindesnes Municipality in Agder county, Norway. The 4.2-square-kilometre (1.6 sq mi) island lies in the North Sea, about 5 kilometres (3.1 mi) southwest of the town of Mandal. The highest point on the island is the 96-metre (315 ft) tall mountain Garpeheia. The island is only accessible by boat, and it has one road which connects the two harbors on the north and east sides of the island. The island has a small permanent population, but it also has many holiday cottages all over the north and east sides of the island.

== See also ==
- List of islands of Norway
