= Sjøsanden =

Beach in Mandal, Norway

- Beach
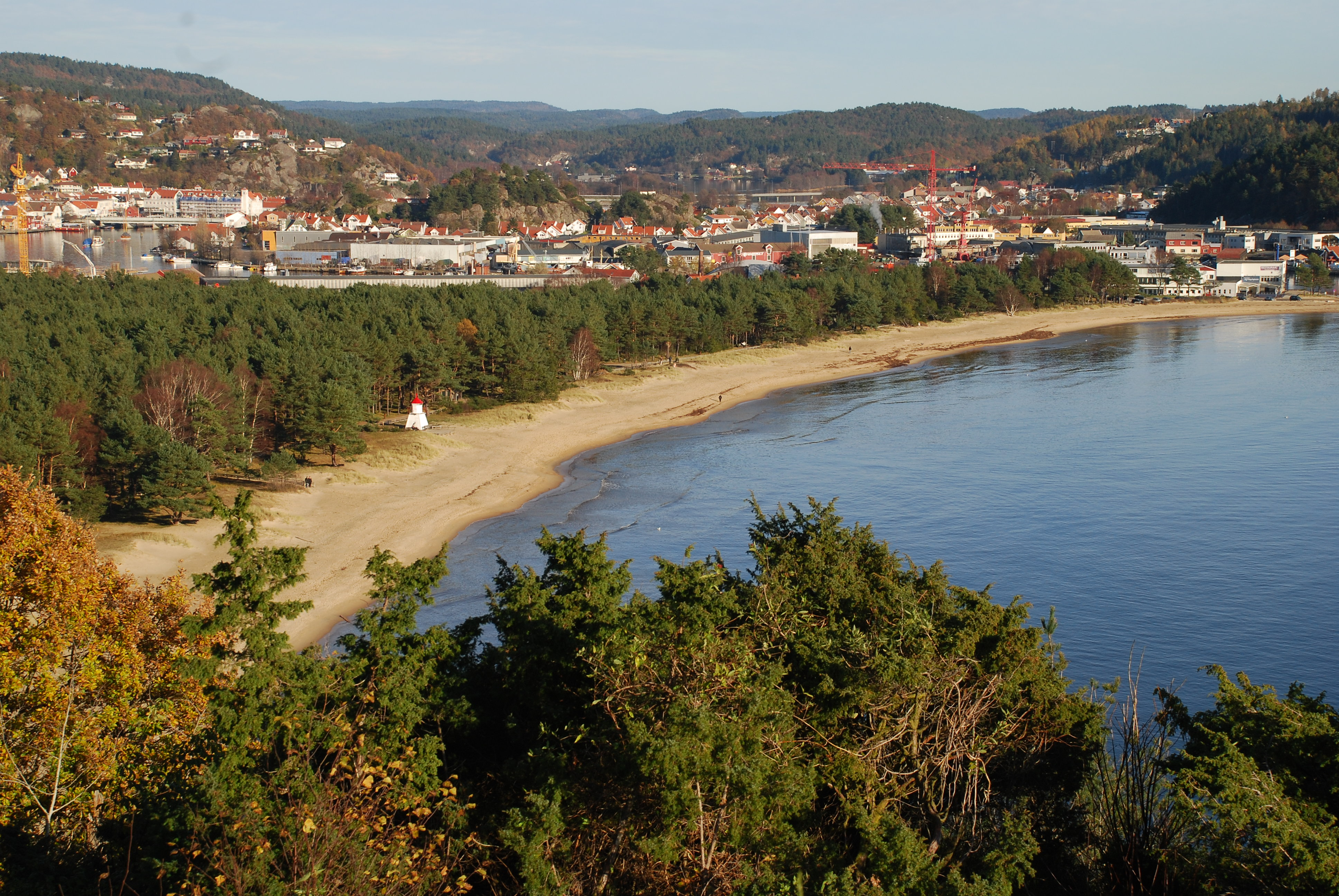
- View of the beach
- Interactive map of Sjøsanden
- Coordinates: 58.01875°N 7.44444°E
- Location: Agder, Norway
- Part of: Mandal
- Offshore water bodies: Mannefjorden

Sjøsanden is a beach in the town of Mandal which is located in Lindesnes Municipality in Agder county, Norway. The beach sits in the Furulunden nature park, along the Mannefjorden, just south of the mouth of the Mandalselva river. The 800-metre (2,600 ft) long beach has been voted several times as the best beach in Norway.

== Media gallery ==
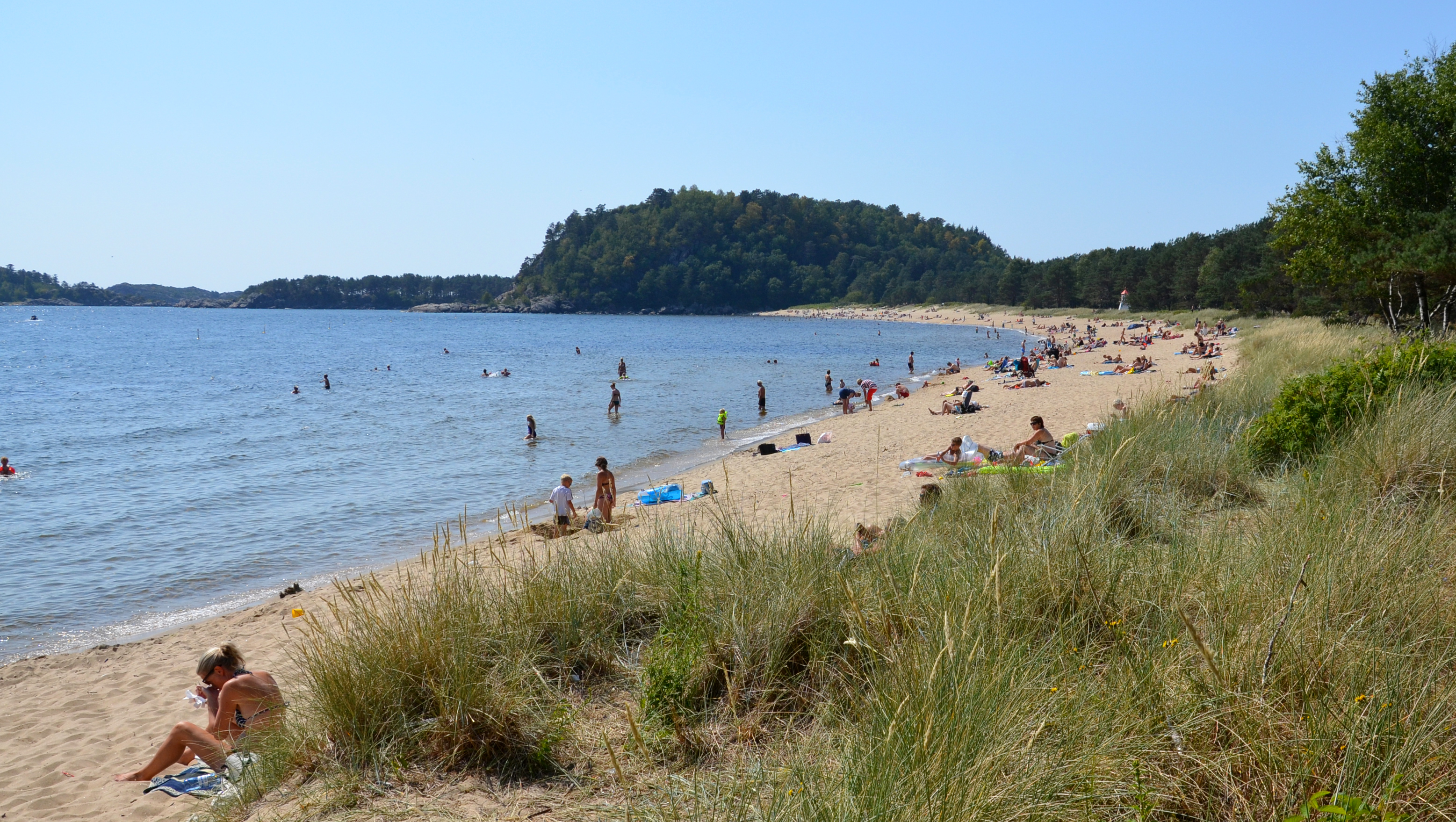
Another view of the beach

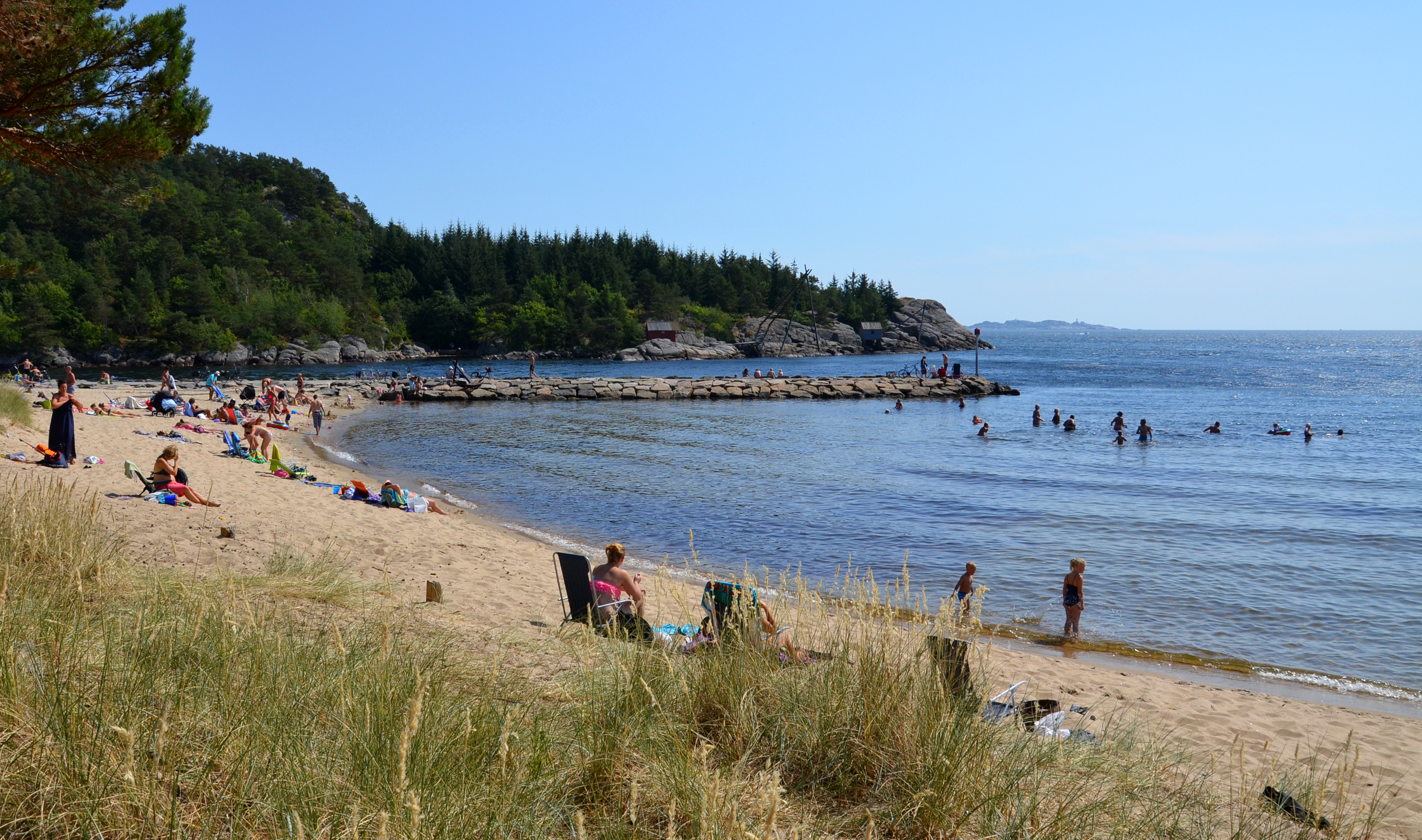
Another view of the beach

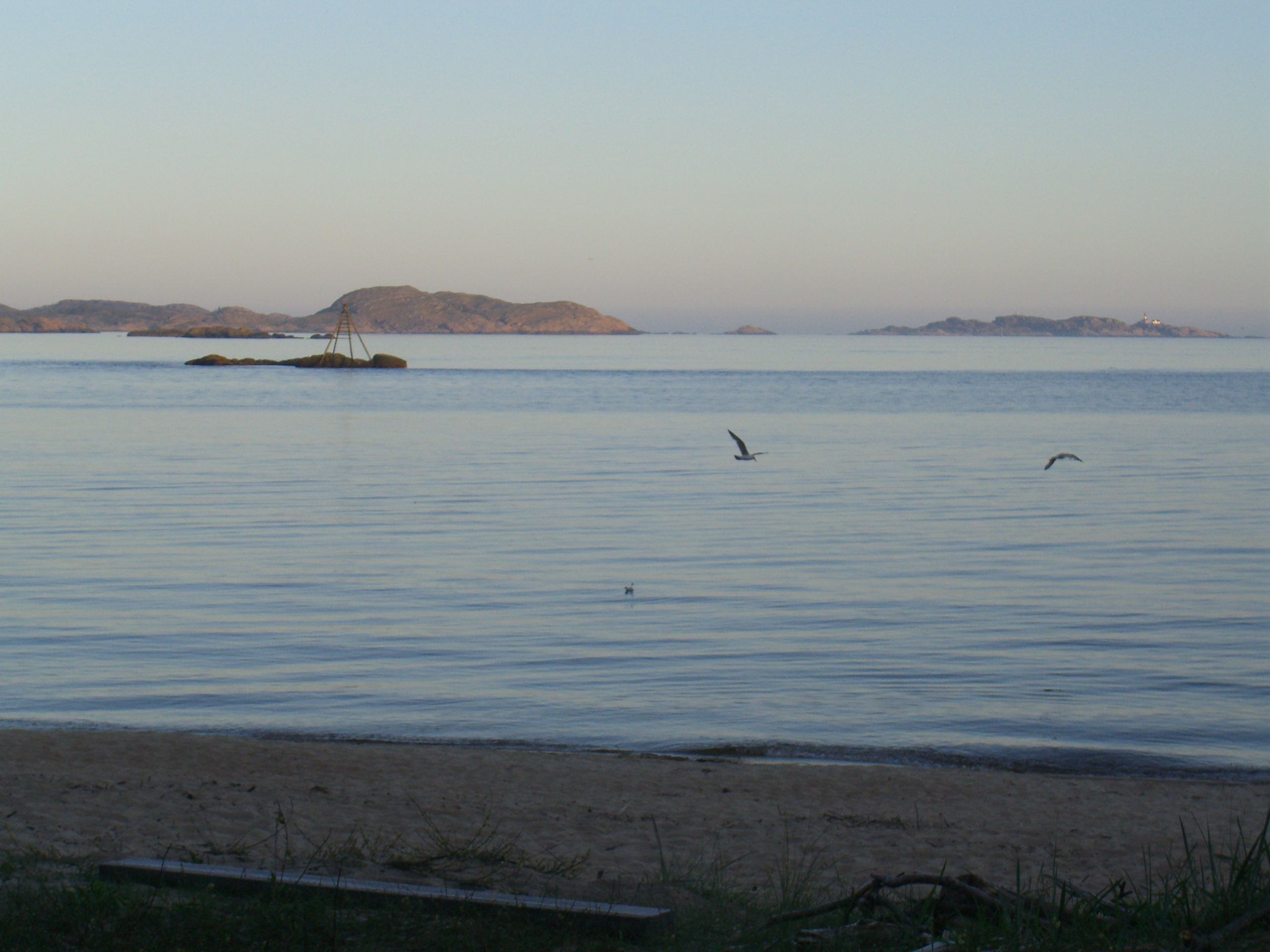
Sjøsanden beach
Credit: kalevkevad (flickr user)
