= Ime =

Village in Lindesnes Municipality, Norway

- Village
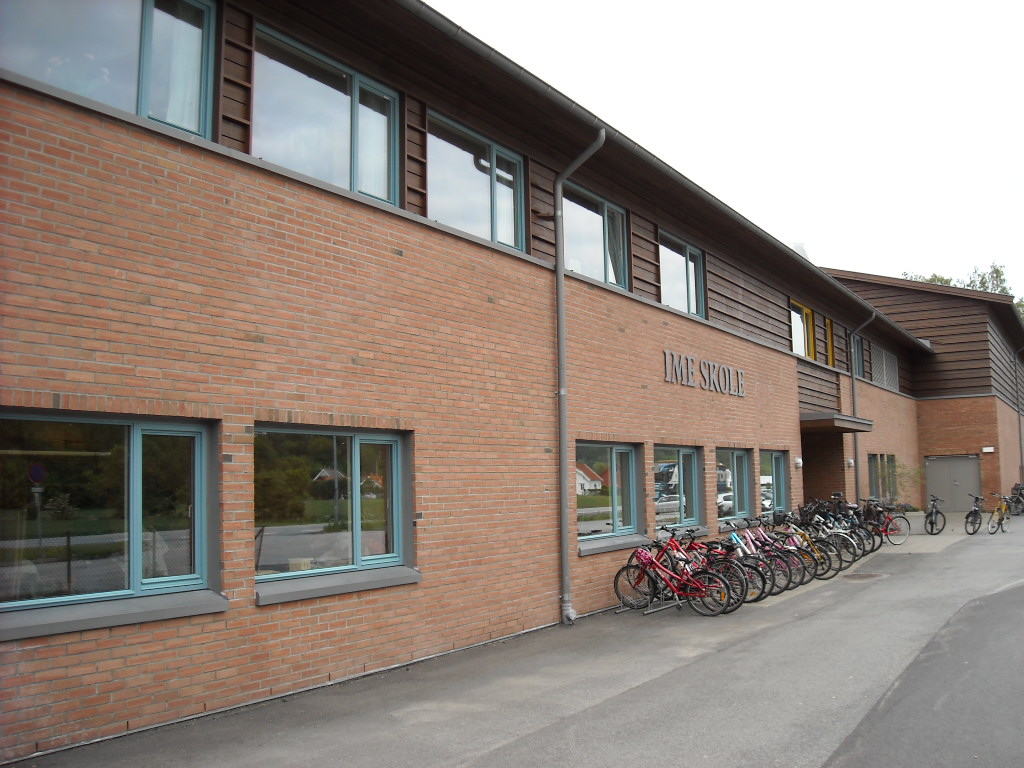
- View of the village school
- Interactive map of Ime
- Coordinates: 58.03462°N 7.49903°E
- Country: Norway
- Region: Southern Norway
- County: Agder
- Municipality: Lindesnes Municipality
- Elevation: 7 m (23 ft)
- Time zone: UTC+01:00 (CET)
  - Summer (DST): UTC+02:00 (CEST)
- Post Code: 4515 Mandal

Ime is a village in Lindesnes Municipality in Agder county, Norway. The village is located on the east side of the river Mandalselva, along the European route E39 highway. Ime is an eastern suburb of the town of Mandal. Ime might be considered to be a "commuter town" with its residents living here, but working in Mandal. There are two schools in Ime.
