= Mandal Church =

Church in Agder, Norway

- Mandal kirke
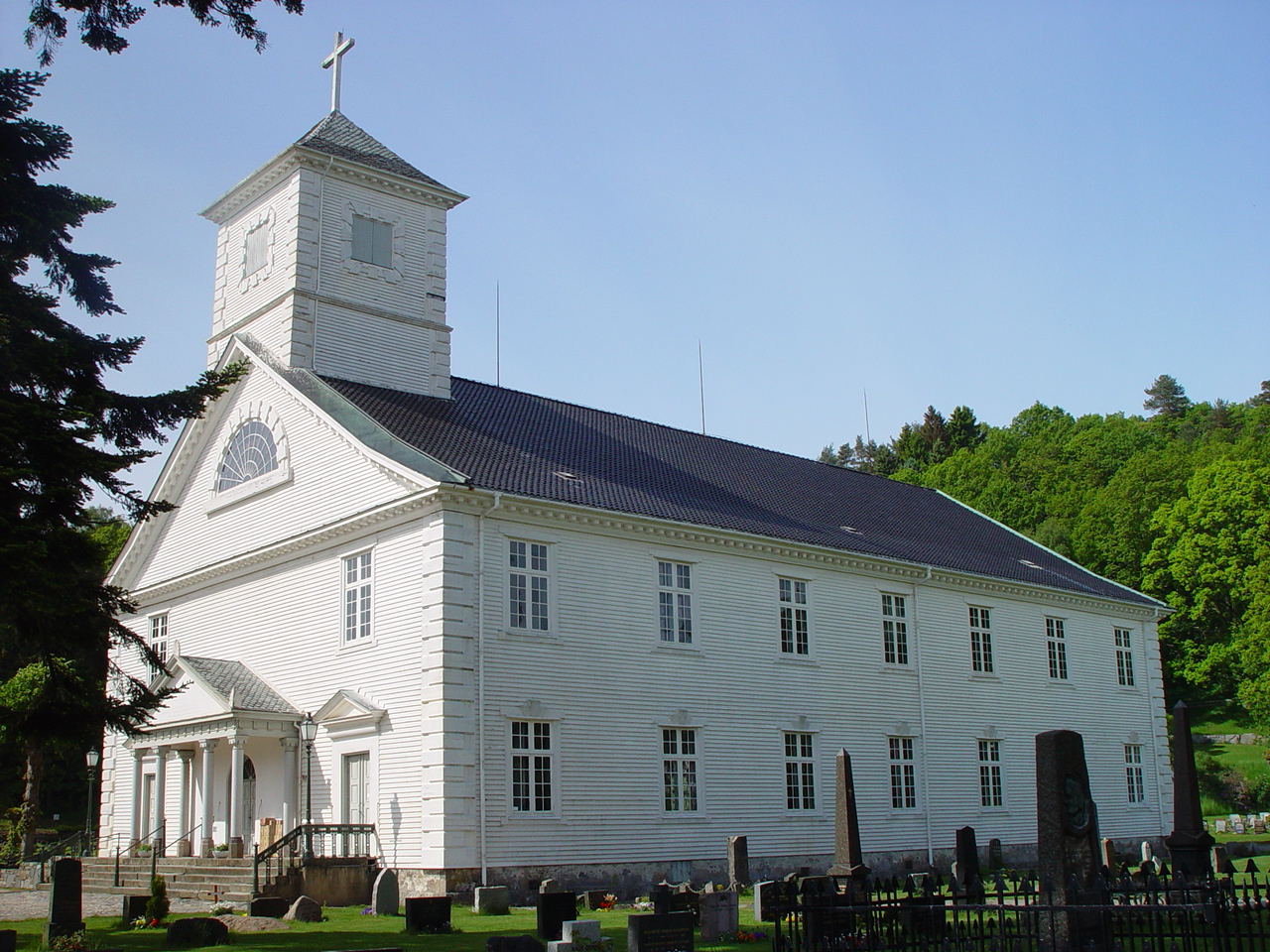
- View of the church
- Mandal Church
- 58.031134°N 07.459593°E
- Location: Lindesnes Municipality, Agder
- Country: Norway
- Denomination: Church of Norway
- Previous denomination: Catholic Church
- Churchmanship: Evangelical Lutheran

History
- Former name: Halse kirke / Halsaa kirke
- Status: Parish church
- Founded: 13th century
- Consecrated: 1821

Architecture
- Functional status: Active
- Architect: Jørgen Gerhard Løser
- Architectural type: Long church
- Style: Empire style
- Completed: 1821 (205 years ago)

Specifications
- Capacity: 1,000
- Materials: Wood

Administration
- Diocese: Agder og Telemark
- Deanery: Lister og Mandal prosti
- Parish: Mandal
- Norwegian Cultural Heritage Site
- Type: Church
- Status: Automatically protected
- ID: 84384

Mandal Church (Norwegian: Mandal kirke) is a parish church of the Church of Norway in Lindesnes Municipality in Agder county, Norway. It is located in the town of Mandal. It is one of the two churches for the Mandal parish which is part of the Lister og Mandal prosti (deanery) in the Diocese of Agder og Telemark. The white, wooden church was built in a long church design in 1821 using plans drawn up by the architect Jørgen Gerhard Løser. It was designed in an empire/neoclassical style. The church seats about 1,000 people, making it the largest wooden church in Norway.

The sanctuary is a large hall supported by colossal columns. A small, cylindrical pulpit is placed above the altarpiece, a rather unusual location compared to most churches in Norway. The church is notable for its distinctive rectangular shape with a simple tower on the roof above the main entrance.

== History ==
The earliest existing historical records of the church date back to the year 1358, but the church was not new at that time. The stone church was called Halse Church at that time, but beyond that not much is known about. The church was almost certainly a fylkeskirke or a county church, since in medieval times the council for Agder met at Halse (now Mandal). A map from 1766 has a depiction of the church, and from this it may appear that it was a rectangular building. The choir had probably been expanded or rebuilt in the late Middle Ages so that the building had a rectangular floor plan where the nave and choir where the same width and roof line. In 1785 the church was described as dilapidated with a number of dangerous cracks in the masonry, and a few years later a large part of the "east wall" was demolished and rebuilt. In 1810, the town of Mandal had a massive fire, and most of the town, including the church, burned down.

After the fire, the town and its roads were redesigned, and it was decided to move the church about 250 metres (820 ft) to the northeast of the former location. The new church was built in a nice flat area with lots of space for a cemetery to surround the church. Construction of rebuilding the whole town began soon after the fire, but it was slow going. Work on the church began in 1812 and was mostly finished by 1819. The church was officially opened and consecrated in 1821.

The architect for the new church was Jørgen Gerhard Løser who used copper engravings of the old church from 1728 by James Gibbs as inspiration for his designs. It was the first monumental building built in Norway after the Norway's independence from Denmark in 1814.

The painting Oppstandelsen (English: Resurrection) is in the church and it was painted by Adolph Tidemand who grew up in Mandal. The church has not undergone major changes since it was opened, but in 2014 a major restoration project on the building was begun to remove extensive dry rot and make many structural repairs. The repairs cost about 33 million kr.

=== Election church ===
In 1814, this church served as an election church (Norwegian: valgkirke). Together with more than 300 other parish churches across Norway, it was a polling station for elections to the 1814 Norwegian Constituent Assembly which wrote the Constitution of Norway. This was Norway's first national elections. Each church parish was a constituency that elected people called "electors" who later met together in each county to elect the representatives for the assembly that was to meet at Eidsvoll Manor later that year.

== Media gallery ==
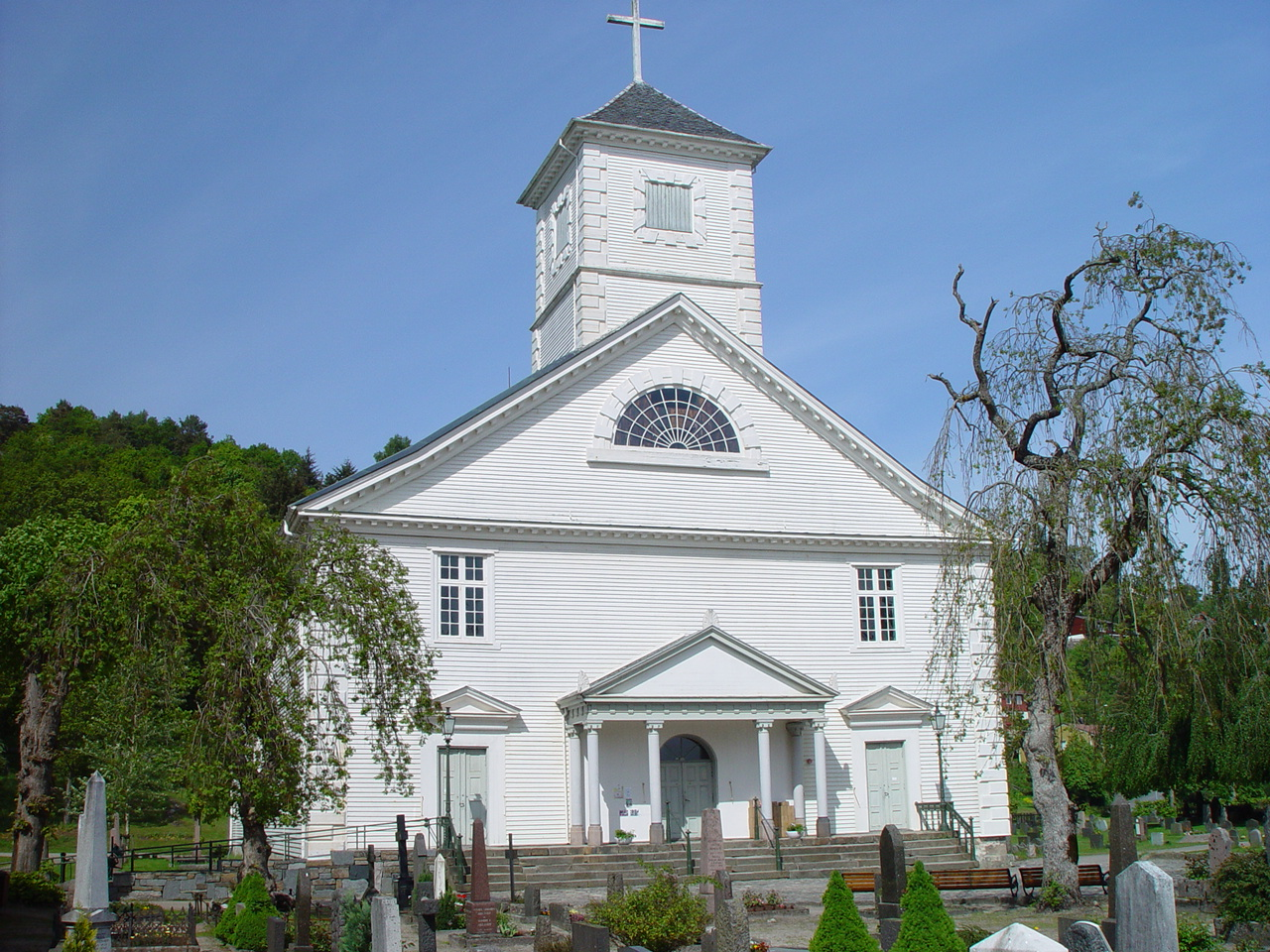

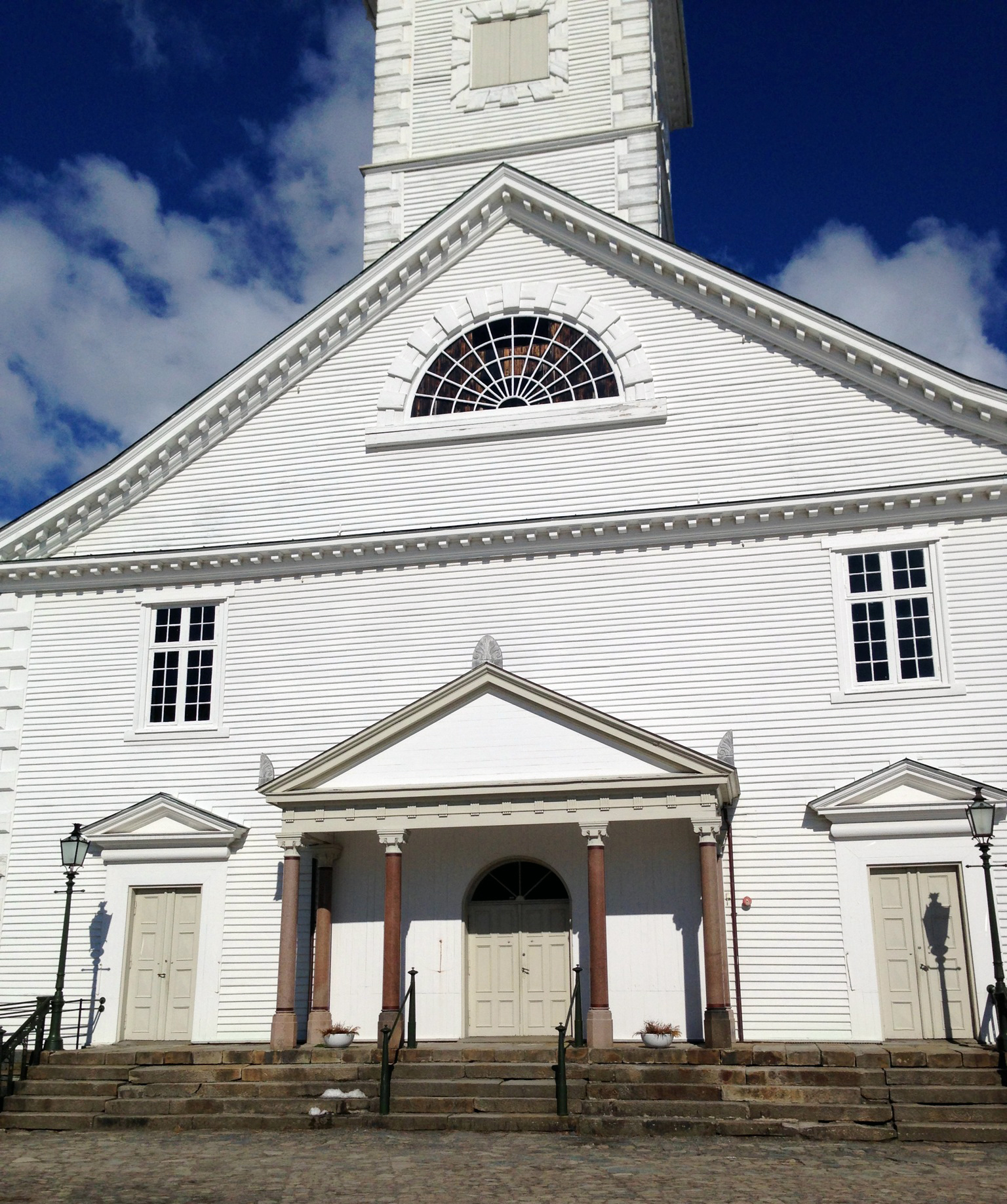

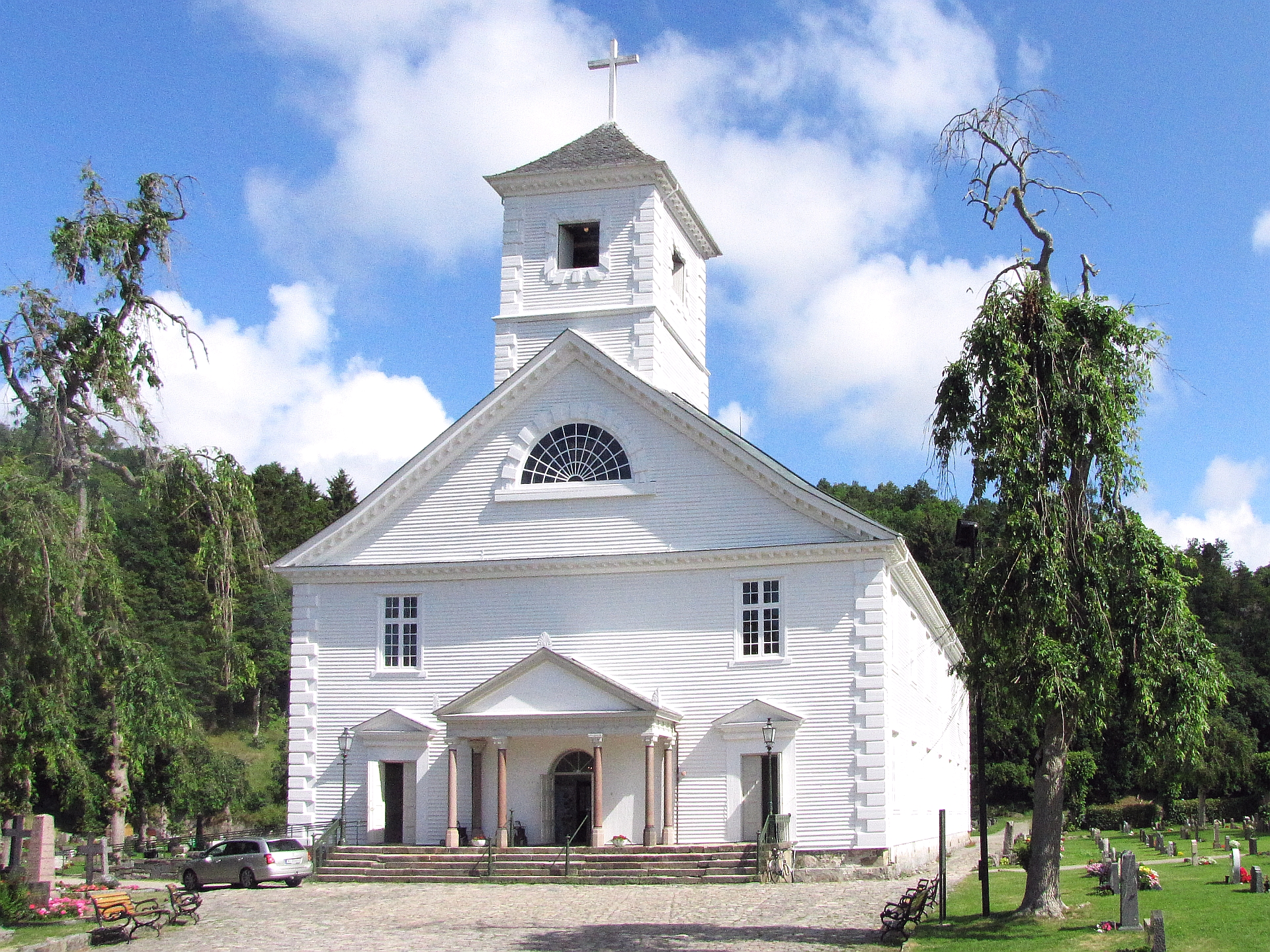

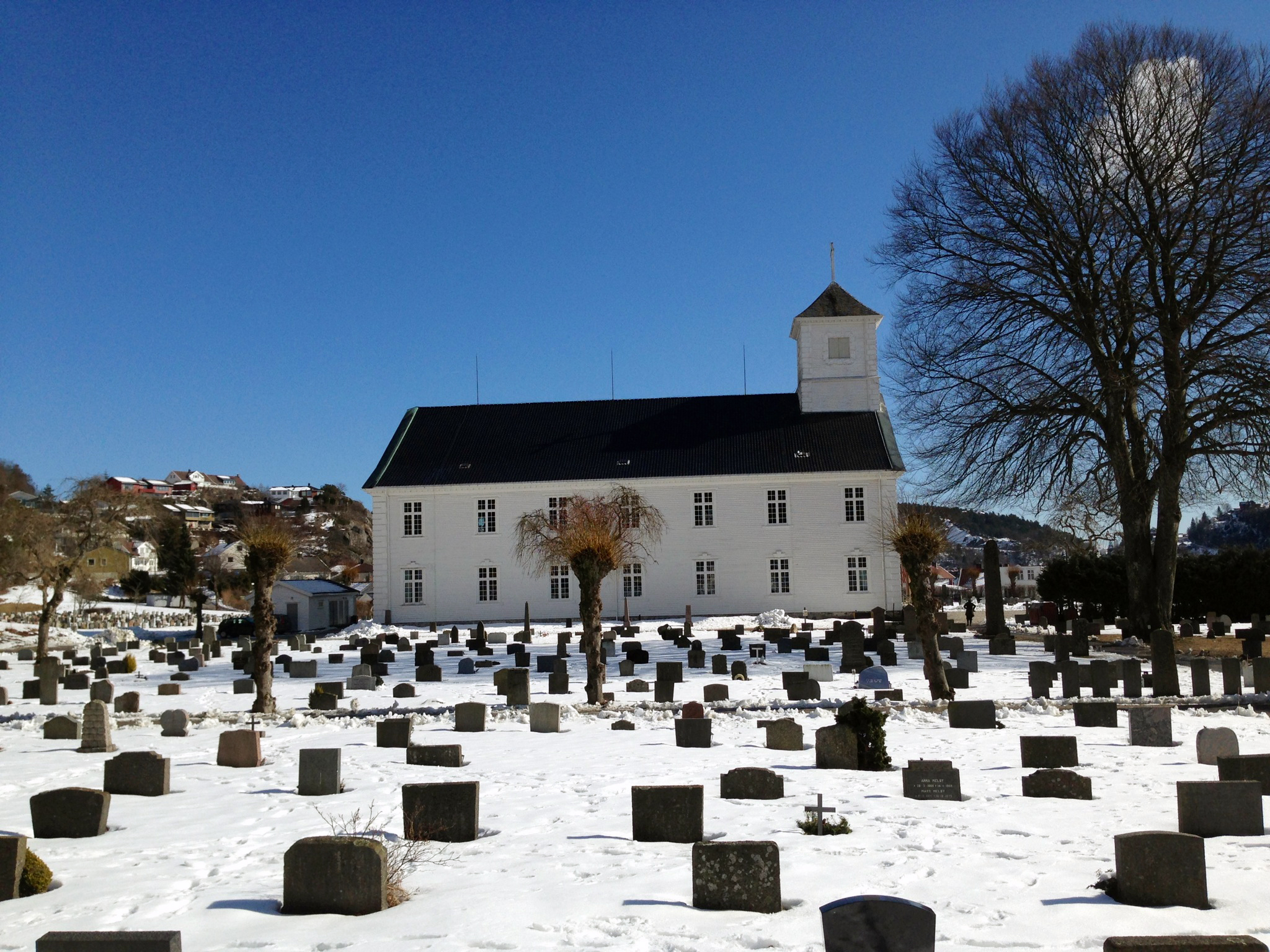

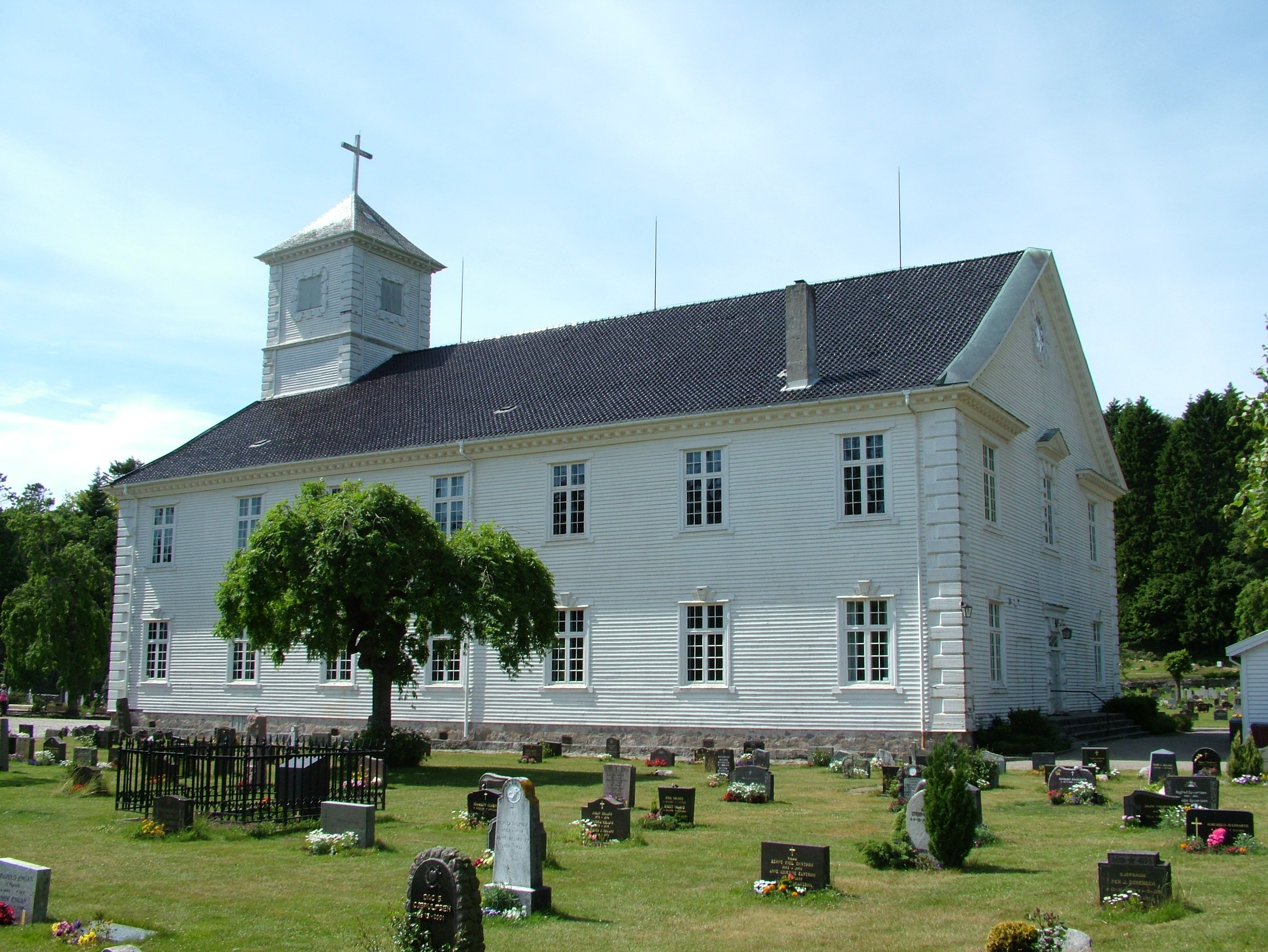

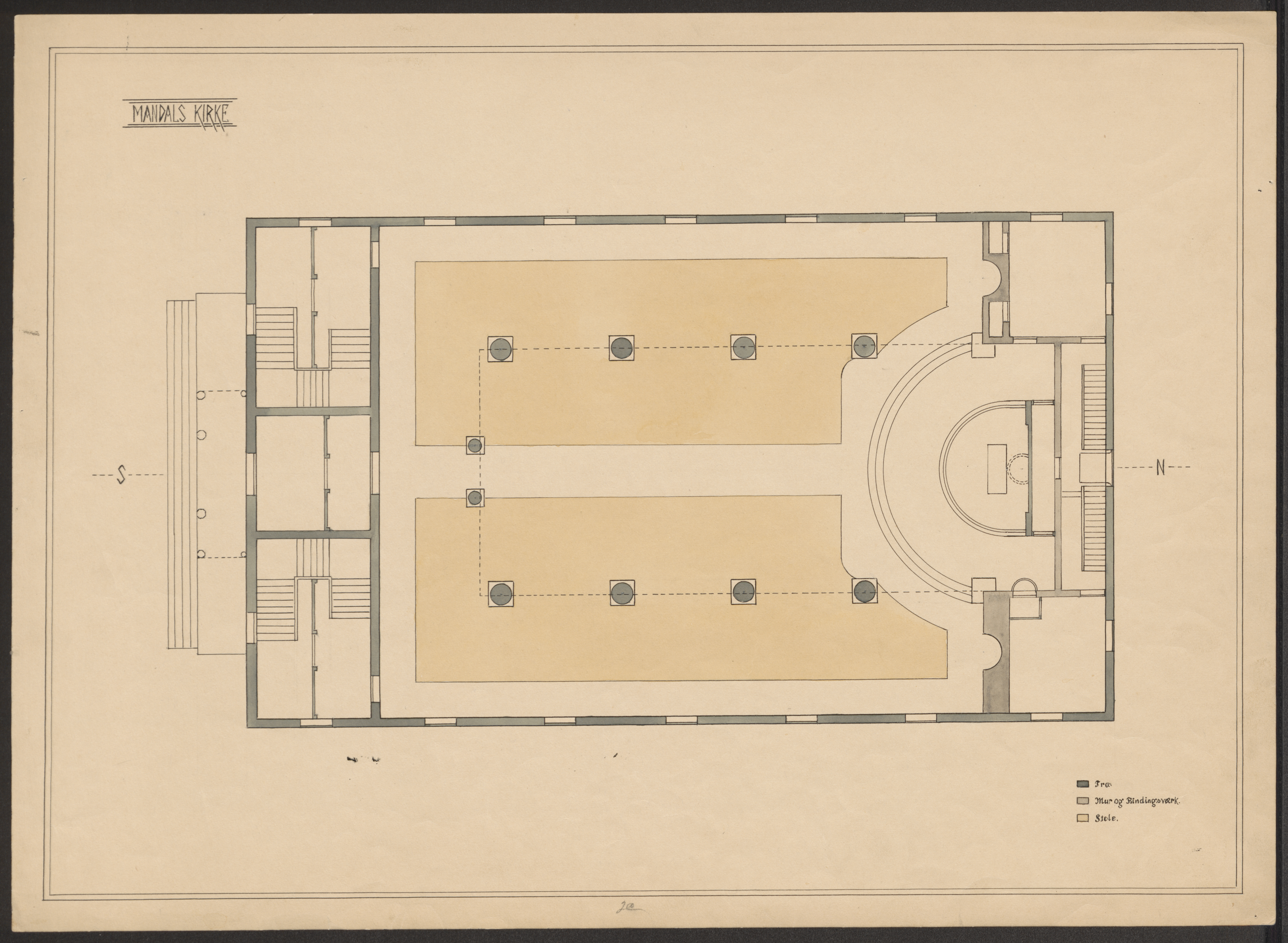

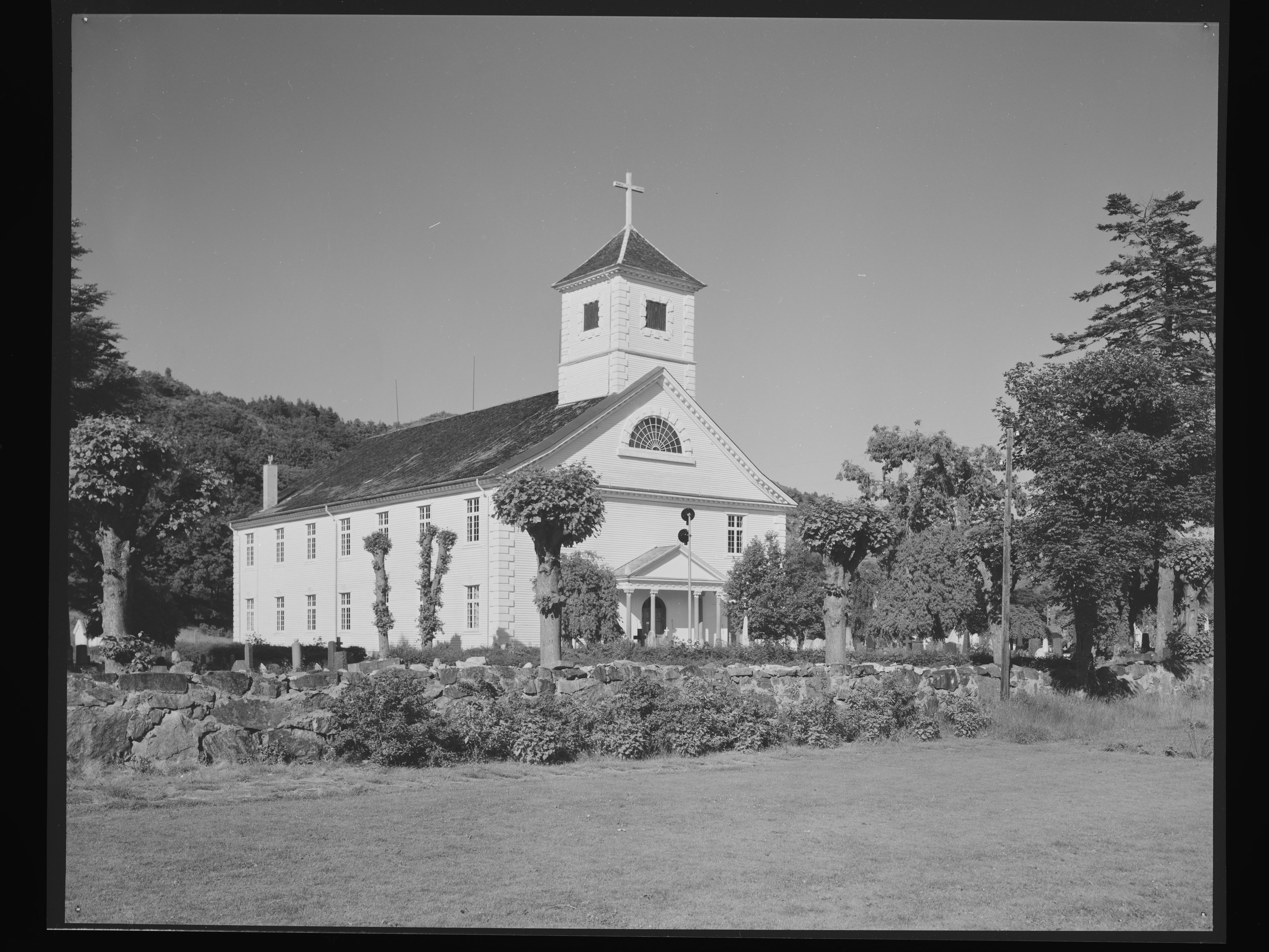

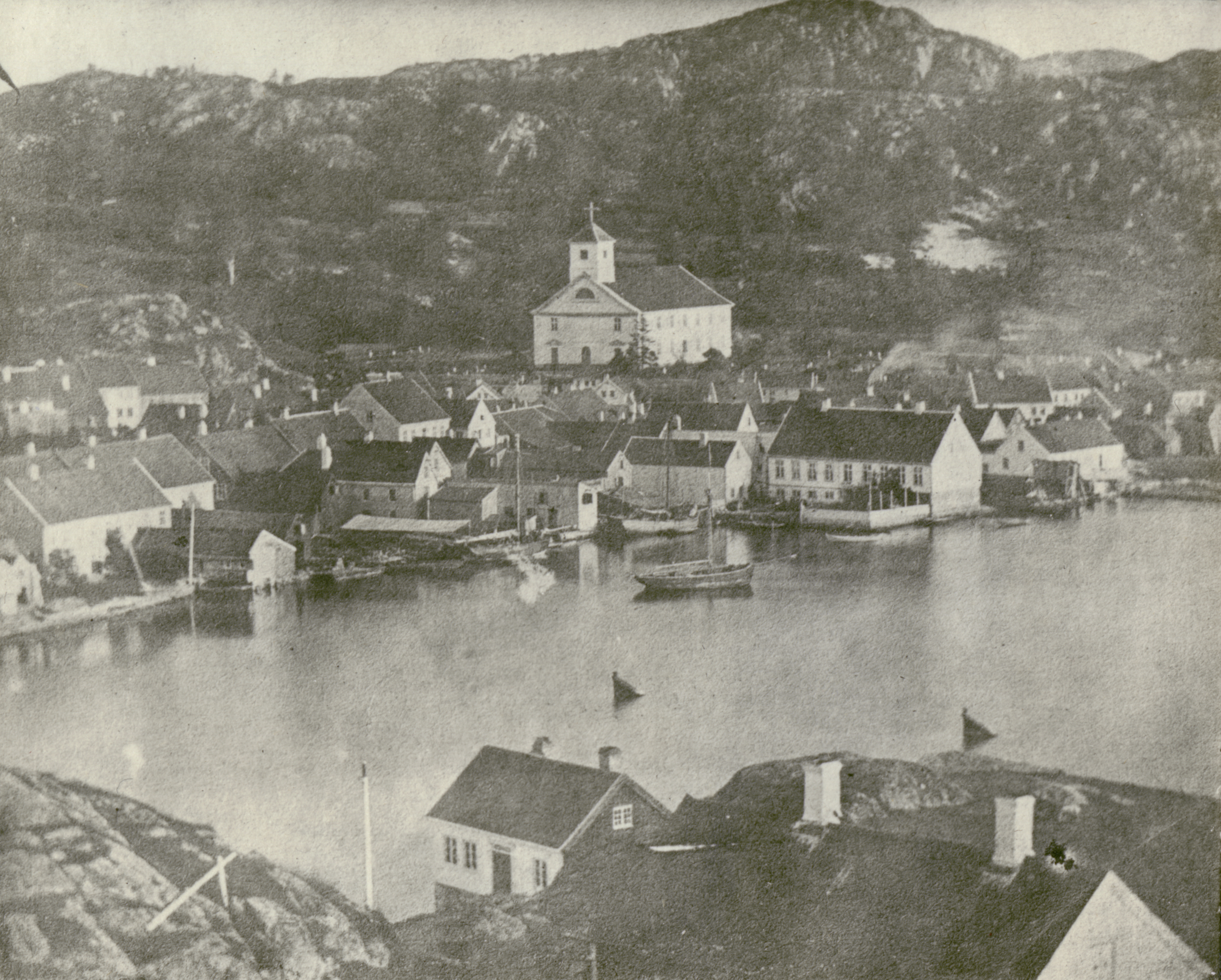

== See also ==
- List of churches in Agder og Telemark
