= Mandal, Norway =

Town in Agder, Norway

Mandal Vester-Risør (historic)
- Town/City
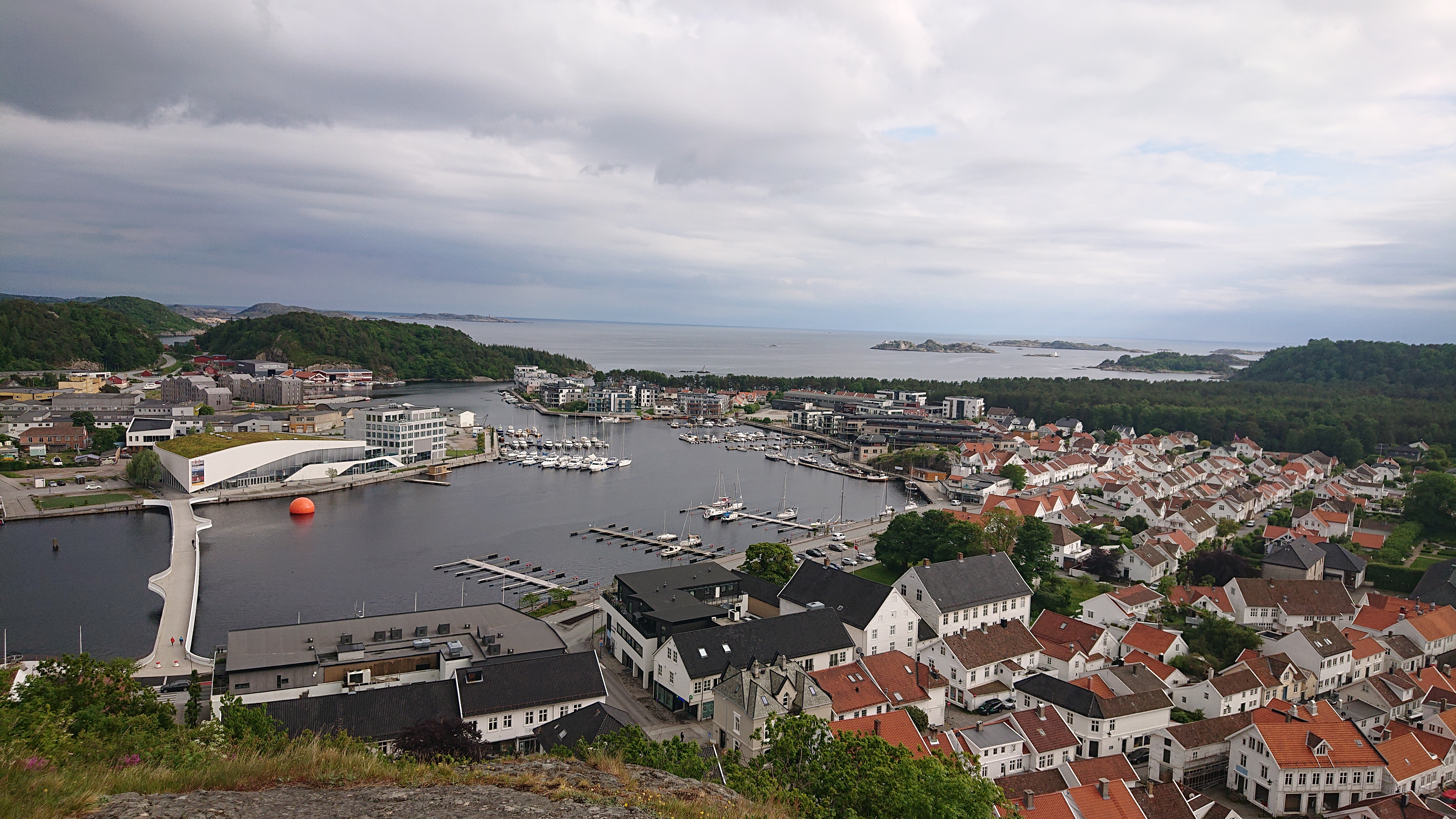
- View of the town
- Interactive map of Mandal
- Coordinates: 58.02682°N 7.45347°E
- Country: Norway
- Region: Southern Norway
- County: Agder
- District: Sørlandet
- Municipality: Lindesnes Municipality
- Established as
- Ladested: 1632
- Kjøpstad: 1921

Area
  - Total: 6.85 km^{2} (2.64 sq mi)
- Elevation: 1 m (3.3 ft)

Population (2025)
  - Total: 11,471
  - Density: 1,675/km^{2} (4,340/sq mi)
- Demonym: Mandalitt
- Time zone: UTC+01:00 (CET)
  - Summer (DST): UTC+02:00 (CEST)
- Post Code: 4501 Mandal

Mandal (Norwegian: [mɑn.ˌdɑːl]) is a town in Lindesnes Municipality in Agder county, Norway. Mandal is the fourth largest town in Agder as well as the administrative centre of Lindesnes Municipality. It is located at the mouth of the river Mandalselva at the southern end of the Mandalen valley. The 6.85-square-kilometre (1,690-acre) town has a population (2025) of 11,471 and a population density of 1,675 inhabitants per square kilometre (4,340/sq mi). The town is also a tourist destination, especially due to its Sjøsanden beach.

In Norway, Mandal is considered a by which can be translated as either a "town" or "city" in English. It received town status as a ladested in 1632 and in 1921 it was upgraded in status to a kjøpstad. Neither designation has any special status under the law anymore, but historically they did.

The town lies along the European route E39 highway, about 40 kilometres (25 mi) southwest of the town of Kristiansand and about 60 kilometres (37 mi) southeast of the town of Flekkefjord. Mandal has a few suburban villages lying just outside its borders such as Ime immediately to the east and Sånum to the southwest. The village of Krossen lies about 10 kilometres (6.2 mi) to the north, along the Mandalselva river.

== History ==
The area in which today's town of Mandal is located was not developed during the Middle Ages. During the 1300s, a trading post called Vester-Risør grew up along the Skogsfjorden, just west of the present-day town. The town began when King Eric of Pomerania gave the town the right to trade salmon. By the 1500s, Vesterrisør was a bustling port and trading centre, making it one of the oldest in Agder. In 1632, the trading post was given ladested rights, which included special trading privileges. During the mid-1600s, the name of the town was changed to Mandal. Salmon fishing and the timber industry pushed the town's growth even more during the 1700s. In 1779, the town's ladested status was formalized in the law. Mandal Church was completed in 1821 after the old church burned down in the town's fire of 1810.

=== Municipal self-government (1838-1963) ===
On 1 January 1838, the small ladested was granted self-governing rights under the new formannskapsdistrikt law, which established it as Mandal Municipality, a municipality that was coterminuous with the town.

During this time, this municipality was governed by a municipal council of directly elected representatives. The mayor was indirectly elected by a vote of the municipal council.

In 1921, Mandal was designated as a kjøpstad, giving it full town status under the law. During the 1960s, there were many municipal mergers across Norway due to the work of the Schei Committee. On 1 January 1964, the town of Mandal (population: 5,446) was merged with the neighboring Halse og Harkmark Municipality (population: 3,676) and most of Holum Municipality (population: 1,127) to form a much larger Mandal Municipality. In 2020, Mandal Municipality was merged into Lindesnes Municipality.

=== Name ===
The town is named after the Mandalen river valley (Old Norse: Marnardalr) in which it is located. The first element is the genitive case of the river name Mǫrn which is now called Mandalselva. The meaning of this old river name is uncertain, but it may be derived from the word marr which means "sea". The last element is dalr which means "valley" or "dale".

Prior to 1653, the town of Mandal was named Vesterrisør (lit. 'western Risør'). The name was originally referring to the island Risøya outside the town, and the first element was added in the 16th century to distinguish it from the town of Østerrisør (meaning "eastern Risør"), which is now simply called Risør.

== Media gallery ==
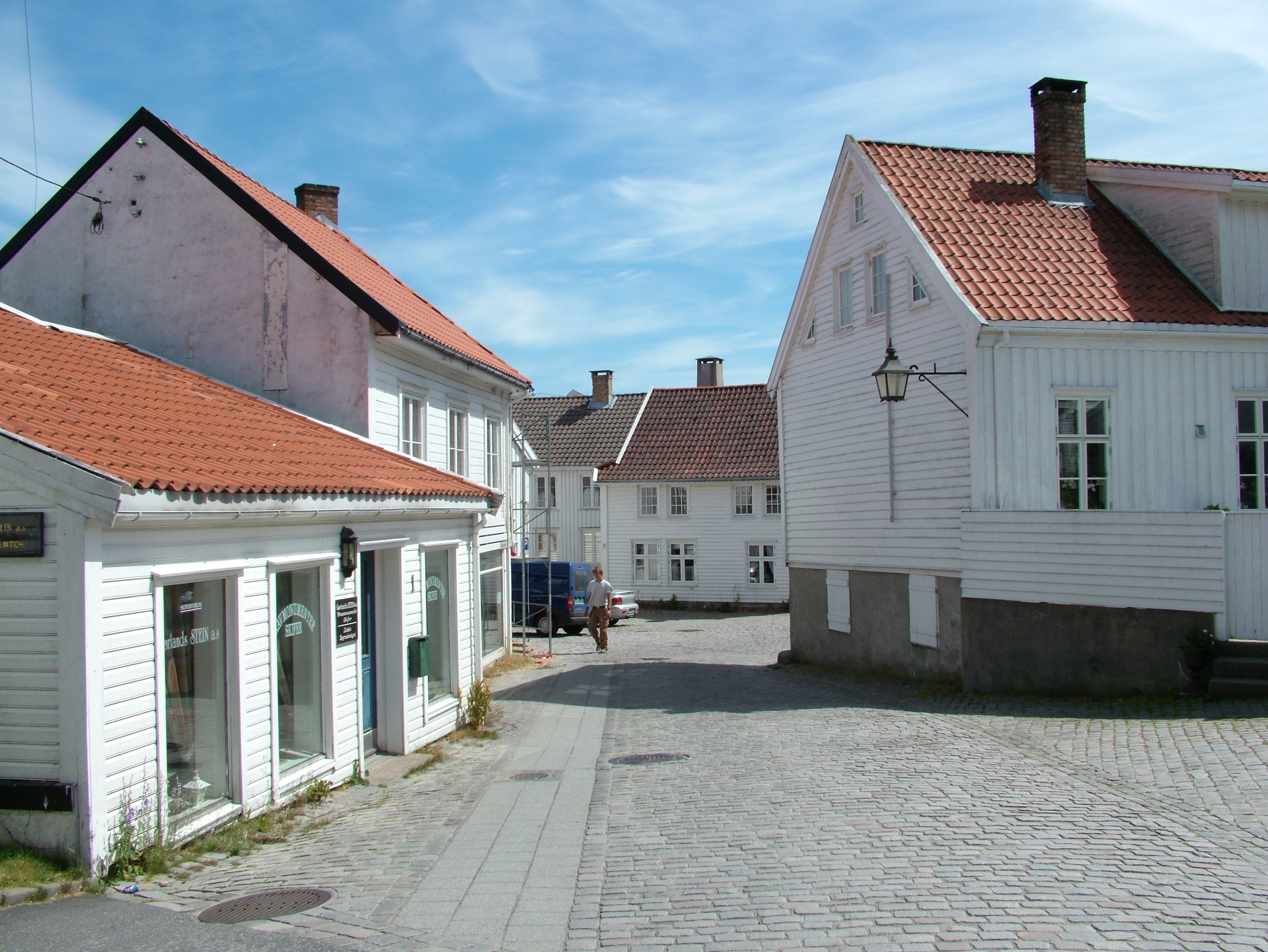
View of part of the town center

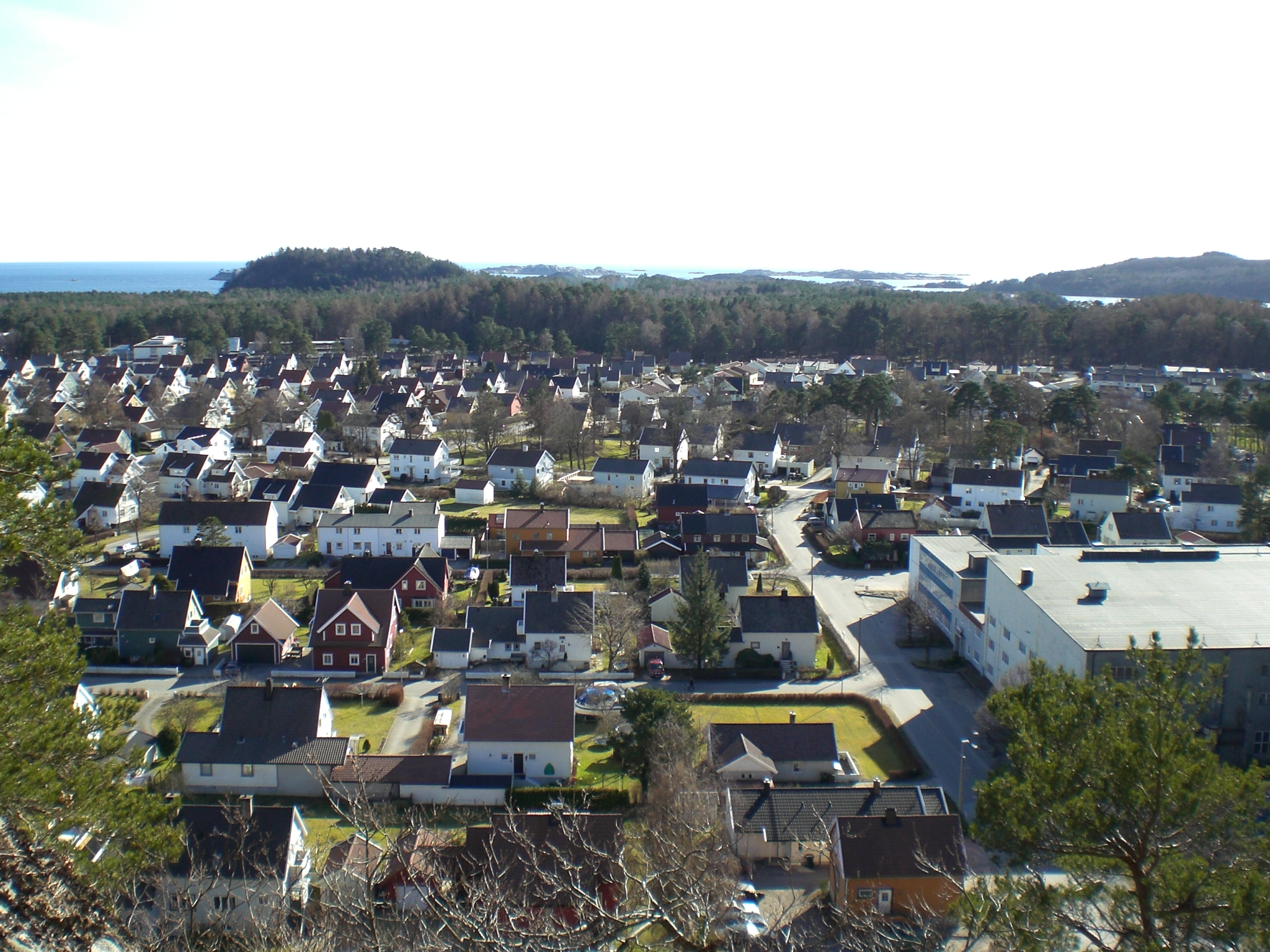
View of the Vestnes area of Mandal

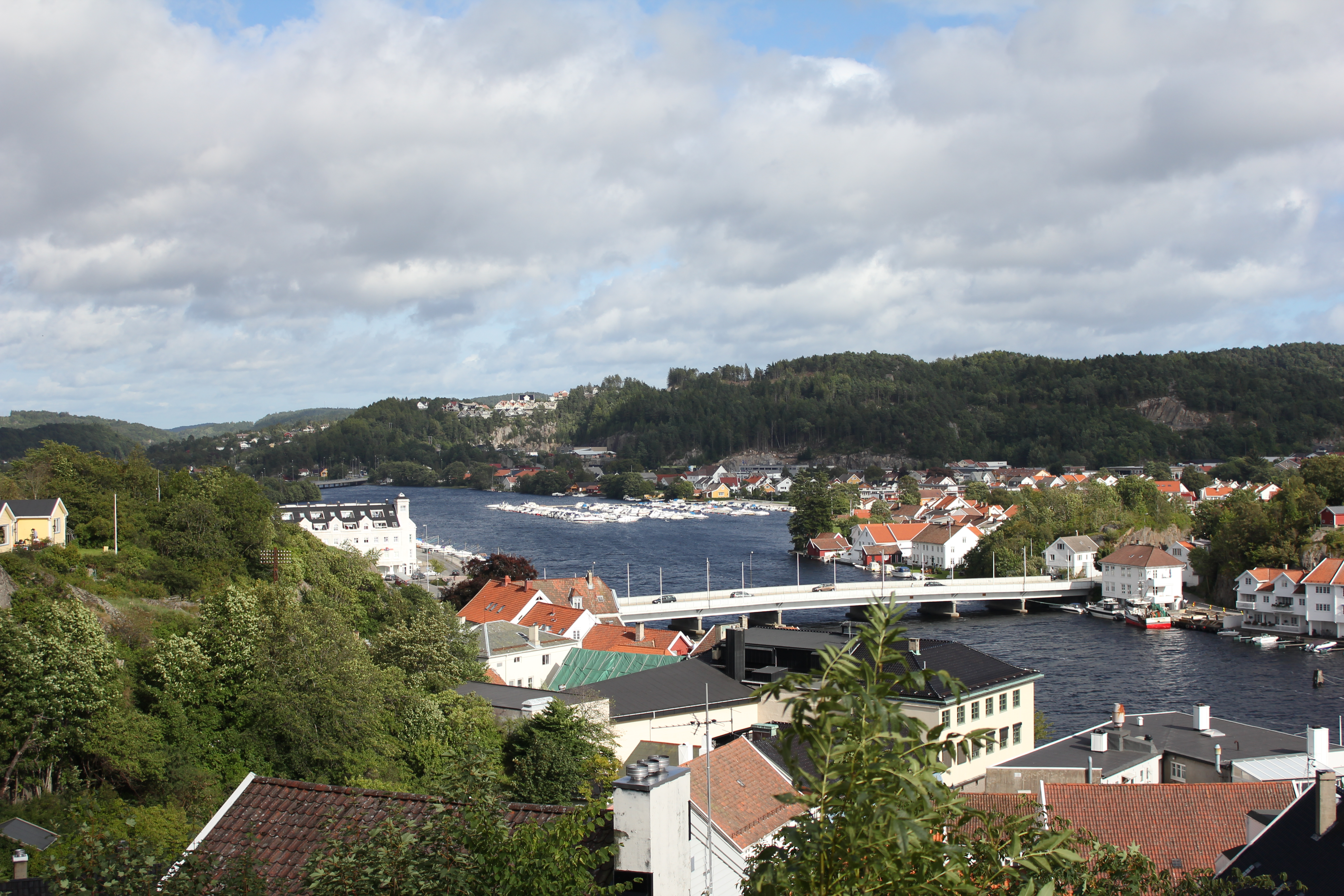
View of the bridge in Mandal

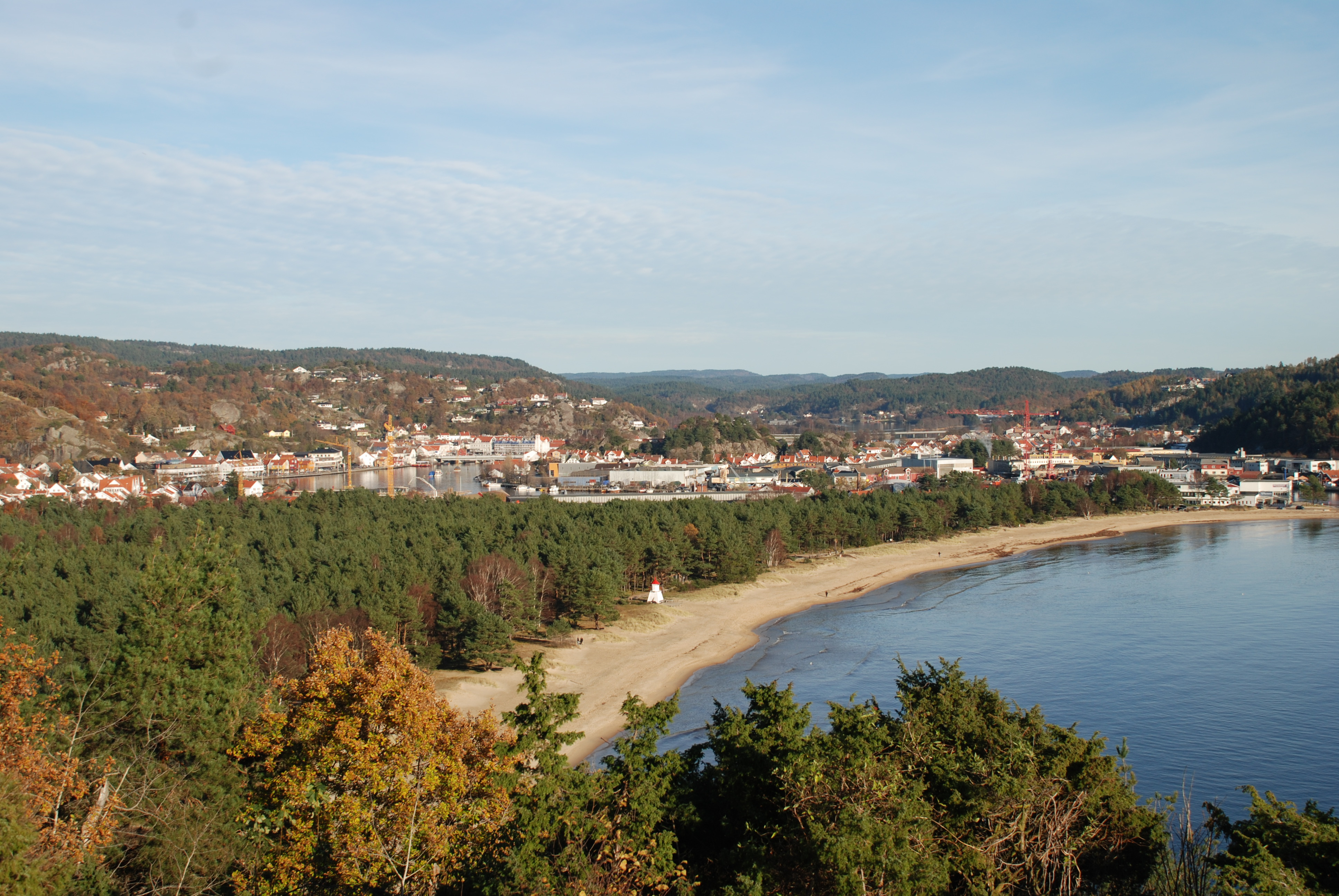
View of the town centre and beach area

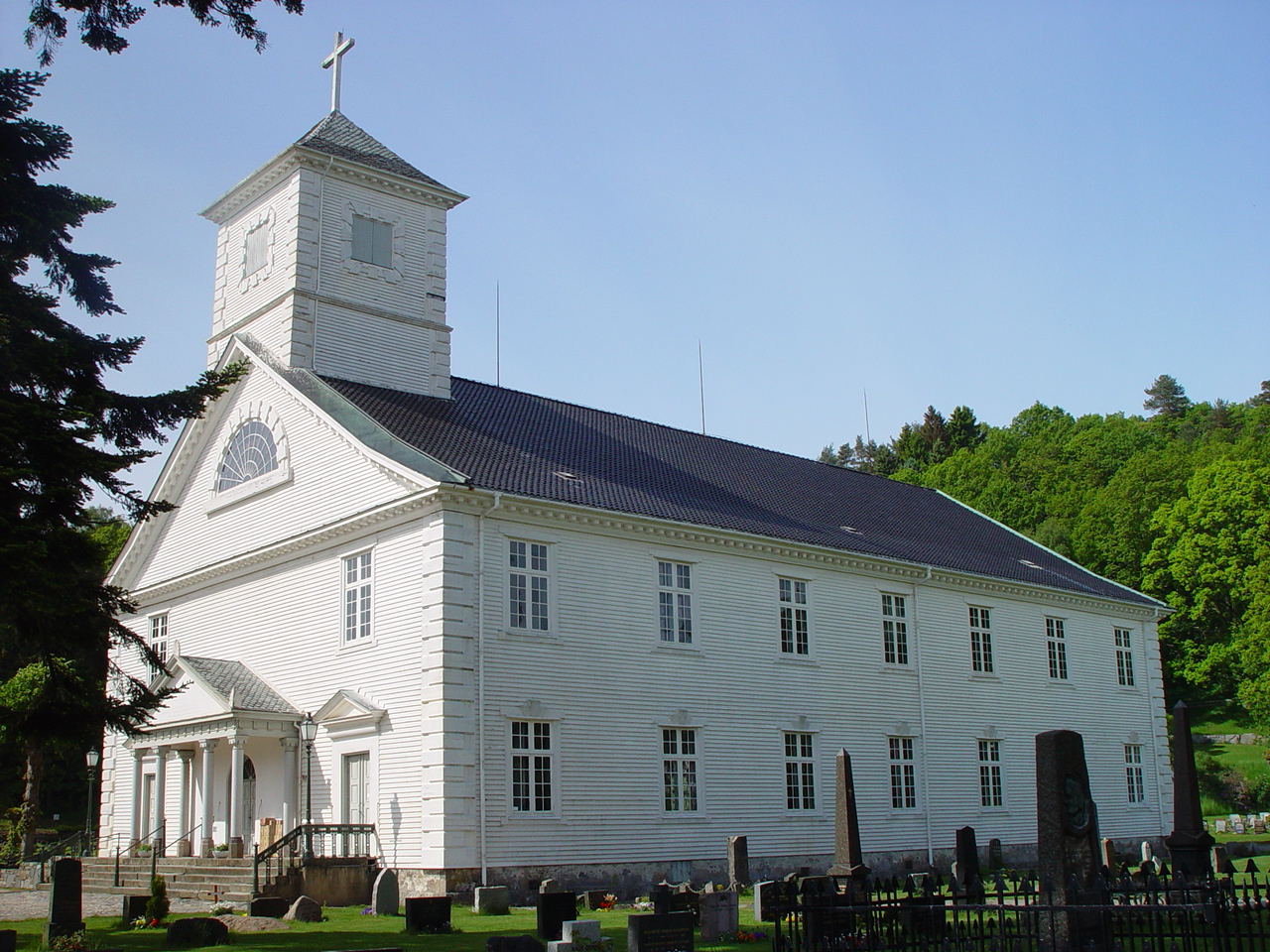
View of the Mandal Church

== See also ==
- List of towns and cities in Norway
