= Extreme points of Norway =

Svalbard
Norway

The extreme points of Norway include the coordinates that are farther north, south, east or west than any other location in Norway; and the highest and the lowest altitudes in the country. The northernmost point is Rossøya on Svalbard, the southernmost is Pysen in Lindesnes Municipality, the easternmost is Kræmerpynten on Svalbard, and the westernmost is Hoybergodden on Jan Mayen. The highest peak is Galdhøpiggen, standing at 2,469 m (8,100 ft) above mean sea level, while the lowest elevation is sea level at the coast.

The Norwegian Antarctic territories—Bouvet Island, Queen Maud Land and Peter I Island—are not part of the Kingdom of Norway. If included, the Antarctic territories account for the southernmost, easternmost, westernmost and highest extreme points.

The latitude and longitude are expressed in degrees, minutes and seconds, in which an "N" value refers to the northern hemisphere, and an "S" value refers to the southern hemisphere. Similarly, a "E" longitude value refers to the eastern hemisphere, and a "W" refers to the western hemisphere. The extreme points of latitude and longitude are published by the Norwegian Mapping Authority, while the elevations are published by the World Fact Book. Both make use of the World Geodetic System (WGS) 84, a geodetic reference system.

== Latitude and longitude ==
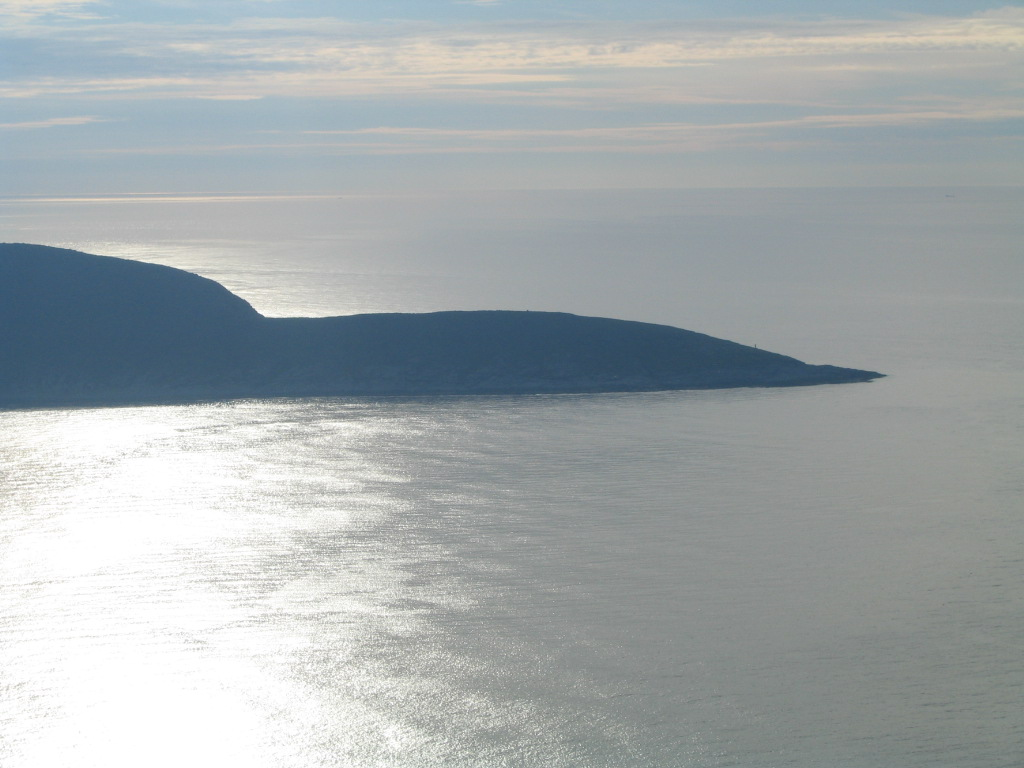
Knivskjellodden is the northernmost point of Norway proper

For the Kingdom of Norway, the northernmost point is Rossøya, just north of Nordaustlandet on the Svalbard archipelago, bordering the Barents Sea. The southernmost point is Pysen in Lindesnes Municipality bordering Skagerrak—the only latitude and longitude extreme point that is in Norway proper. The easternmost location is Kræmerpynten on Svalbard, bordering the Barents Sea, while the westernmost point is Hoybergodden on Jan Mayen, bordering the Greenland Sea.

All four latitude and longitude extreme points are bordering the sea; due to the geographic nature of the coastline, all extremities are located on islands. Therefore, extreme points of the Norwegian mainland are also included in the list. The northernmost point is Knivskjellodden, located in Magerøya in Finnmark. The northernmost mainland point is Cape Nordkinn, located in Lebesby Municipality, Finnmark; this is also the northernmost location of mainland Europe. Both border the Barents Sea. The southernmost location of Norway proper is Pysen, while the southernmost mainland location the Lindesnes peninsula in Lindesnes Municipality; both border Skagerrak. The easternmost point is Hornøya, with Kibergsneset being the easternmost mainland location. Both are in Vardø Municipality in Finnmark. The westernmost location is Holmebåen in Solund Municipality in Vestland county, while the westernmost mainland location is Vardetangen in Austrheim Municipality, also in Vestland. Both border the North Sea.

If Antarctica is included, the southernmost point is the South Pole. All seven Antarctic claims meet there, so this point borders all other six territories. The easternmost point is the border between Queen Maud Land and the Australian Antarctic Territory, which follows the 45th meridian east. The westernmost point is Peter I Island. As the only Antarctic claim that is not a sector, it borders the Amundsen Sea.

| Heading | Scope | Location | Region | Bordering entity | Coordinates | Ref |
|---|---|---|---|---|---|---|
| North | Kingdom | Rossøya | Svalbard | Barents Sea | 80°49′44.41″N 20°20′32.29″E | |
| North | Proper | Knivskjellodden | Magerøya | Barents Sea | 71°11′08.56″N 25°40′30.79″E | |
| North | Mainland | Cape Nordkinn | Lebesby Municipality | Barents Sea | 71°08′02.47″N 27°39′13.62″E | |
| South | Kingdom | Pysen | Lindesnes Municipality | Skagerrak | 57°57′30.63″N 07°33′52.30″E | |
| South | Mainland | Lindesnes | Lindesnes Municipality | Skagerrak | 57°58′46.28″N 07°03′19.19″E | |
| South | Dependencies | Larsøya | Bouvet Island | Atlantic Ocean | 54°27′S 3°31′E | |
| South | Antarctica | South Pole | Queen Maud Land | n/a | 90°00′00″S 00°00′00″E | |
| East | Kingdom | Kræmerpynten | Svalbard | Barents Sea | 80°13′45.28″N 33°30′58.74″E | |
| East | Proper | Hornøya | Vardø Municipality | Barents Sea | 70°23′12.63″N 31°10′06.93″E | |
| East | Mainland | Kibergsneset | Vardø Municipality | Barents Sea | 70°17′20.96″N 31°03′51.54″E | |
| East | Antarctica | Eastern Border | Queen Maud Land | Australian Antarctic Territory | 67°45′00″S 45°00′00″E | |
| West | Kingdom | Hoybergodden | Jan Mayen | Greenland Sea | 70°51′49.05″N 09°04′38.86″W | |
| West | Proper | Holmebåen | Solund Municipality | North Sea | 61°04′24.07″N 04°29′57.01″E | |
| West | Mainland | Vardetangen | Austrheim Municipality | North Sea | 60°48′36.61″N 04°56′43.18″E | |
| West | Antarctica | — | Peter I Island | Amundsen Sea | 68°47′00″S 90°35′00″W | |

== Altitude ==
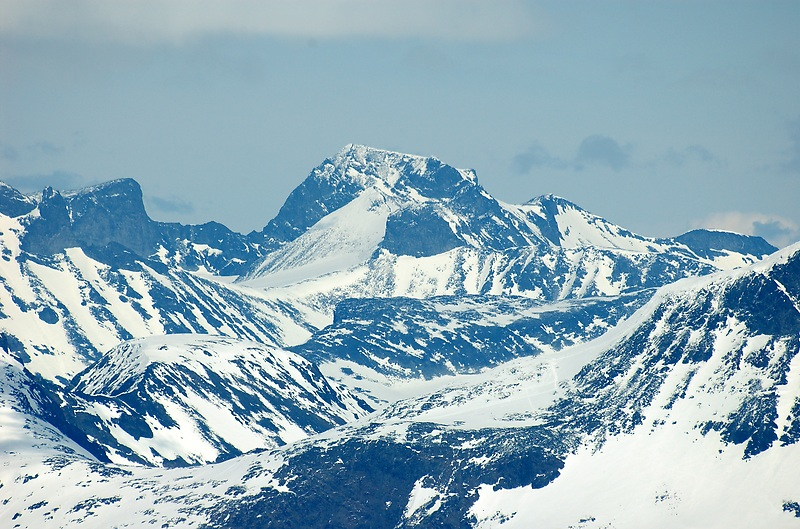
Galdhøpiggen is Norway's tallest peak

The highest point in the kingdom is Galdhøpiggen, which, standing at 2,469 m (8,100 ft) above mean sea level, is located in Lom Municipality. Galdhøpiggen is part of the Jotunheimen mountain range, as well as Jotunheimen National Park. It is also the highest peak along the Scandinavian Mountains. If Antarctica is included, the highest peak is Jøkulkyrkja, standing at 3,148 metres (10,328 ft). It is located in the Mühlig-Hofmann Mountains in Princess Astrid Coast. Norway's lowest point is located on the coast, at sea level. The coast stretches 83,281 kilometres (51,748 mi), including fjords, bays and islands.

| Extremity | Name | Elevation | Range | Region | Coordinates | Ref |
|---|---|---|---|---|---|---|
| Highest (kingdom) | Galdhøpiggen | 2,469 m (8,100 ft) | Jotunheimen | Lom Municipality | 61°38′11″N 8°18′45″E | |
| Highest (Antarctica) | Jøkulkyrkja | 3,148 m (10,328 ft) | Mühlig-Hofmann Mountains | Queen Maud Land | 71°53′00″S 6°40′00″E | |
| Lowest | Sea level | 0 m (0 ft) | Coast | Atlantic Ocean | n/a | |

== Transportation ==
| Heading | Airport | Railway station | Bus stop | Road |
|---|---|---|---|---|
| North | incl islands: Longyearbyen mainland: Mehamn | Narvik | incl Svalbard: Svalbard Airport excl Svalbard: North Cape | incl Svalbard: Ny-Ålesund excl Svalbard: North Cape |
| South | Kristiansand | Kristiansand | Nedre Våge, Lindesnes Municipality | Lindesnesveien, Lindesnes |
| West | incl islands: Florø mainland: Bergen | Bergen | Halsøy near Værlandet | Sørevågen, Solund |
| East | Vardø | Bjørnfjell | Vardø skole (Vardø) | Idrettsgata, Vardø |
| Highest | Røros, 626 m | Finse, 1222 m | Juvasshytta, 1840 m | Juvasshytta, 1840 m |

Note that the southernmost point which is reachable without using a boat is in fact not Lindesnes Lighthouse, but a rocky cape in Ytre Farestad on the island of Skjernøya. It is not per definition the southernmost mainland point, nor the southernmost island point, but the island has a road bridge to mainland.

== See also ==
- Centre of Norway
- Geography of Norway
- Extreme points of Earth
