= Ryvingen Lighthouse =

Coastal lighthouse in Norway

Ryvingen Lighthouse Ryvingen fyrstasjon
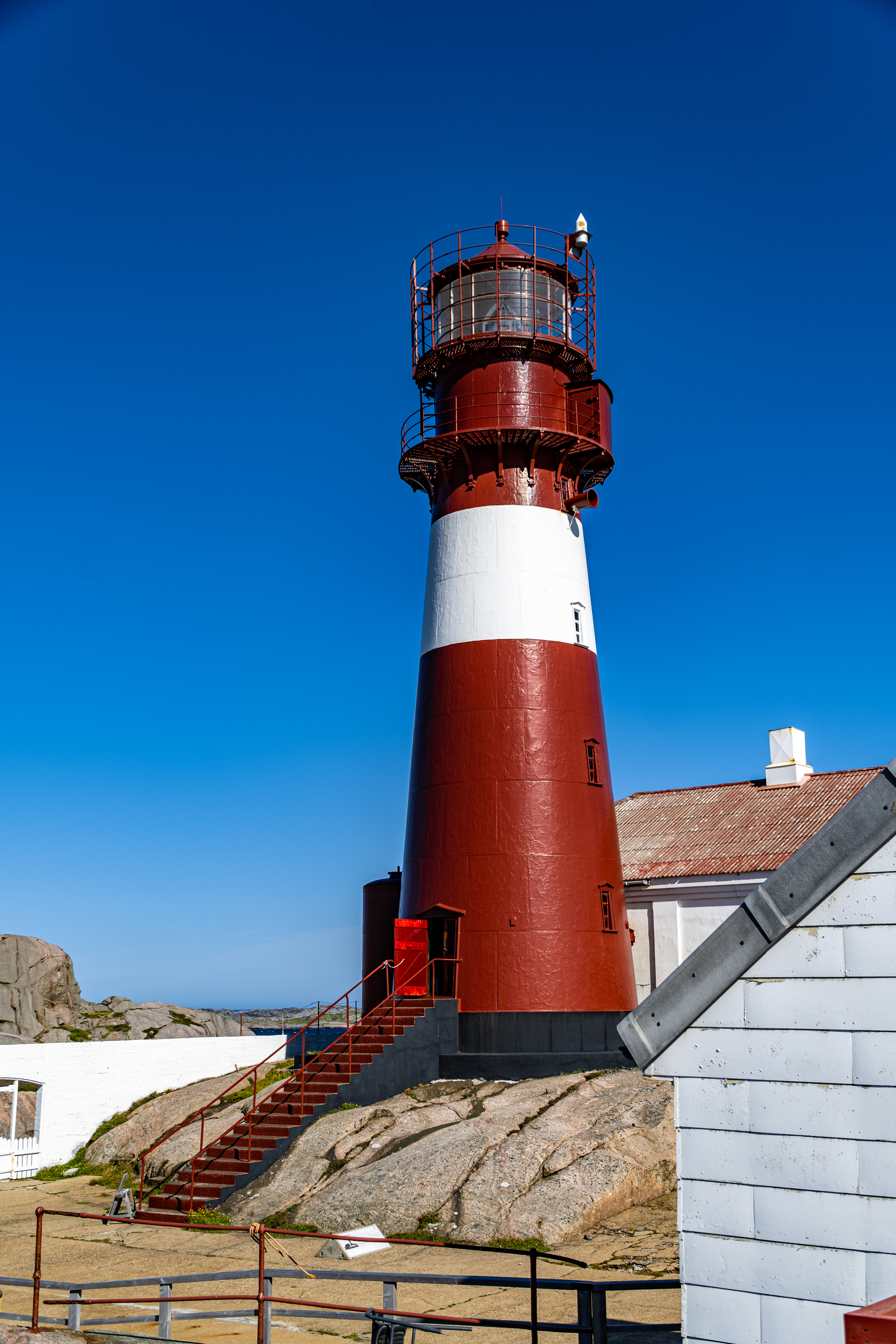
- View of Ryvingen Lighthouse
- Location: Agder, Norway
- Coordinates: 57°58′05″N 07°29′29″E

Tower
- Constructed: 1867
- Construction: Cast iron
- Automated: 2002
- Height: 22.5 metres (74 ft)
- Shape: Cylindrical
- Markings: Red with white stripe
- Operator: Ryvingen fyrstasjon
- Heritage: cultural property
- Racon: M (− − )

Light
- Focal height: 52 metres (171 ft)
- Intensity: 996,500 candela
- Range: 19.5 nmi (36.1 km; 22.4 mi)
- Characteristic: Fl(4) W 40s
- Norway no.: 079000

Ryvingen Lighthouse (Norwegian: Ryvingen fyrstasjon) is a coastal lighthouse located on the 0.4-square-kilometre (99-acre) island of Låven in the North Sea. It is the southernmost lighthouse in Norway. It is located in Lindesnes Municipality in Agder county. The island lies about 5 kilometres (3.1 mi) southeast of the town of Mandal, marking the east side of the fjord leading to Mandal. The west side of the fjord is marked by the Hatholmen Lighthouse.

The lighthouse sits just south of the island of Skjernøya and northwest of the skerry of Pysen (the southernmost part of Norway). Ryvingen Lighthouse was first lit in 1867 and it was automated in 2002, and is listed as a protected historical site. In 2002, it was transferred to the town of Mandal which has restored the buildings and made them available for overnight accommodations.

The cylindrical cast iron lighthouse is 22.5 metres (74 ft) tall. It is painted red with a white, horizontal stripe encircling it. The light sits at an elevation of 52 metres (171 ft) above sea level. The 996,500-candela light emits four white flashes every 40 seconds. The lighthouse also emits a racon signal in the form of the morse code letter M (− − ). The lighthouse is attached to a 1 1/2-story crew quarters building which is now available for overnight rentals. The island is only accessible by boat.

== Media gallery ==
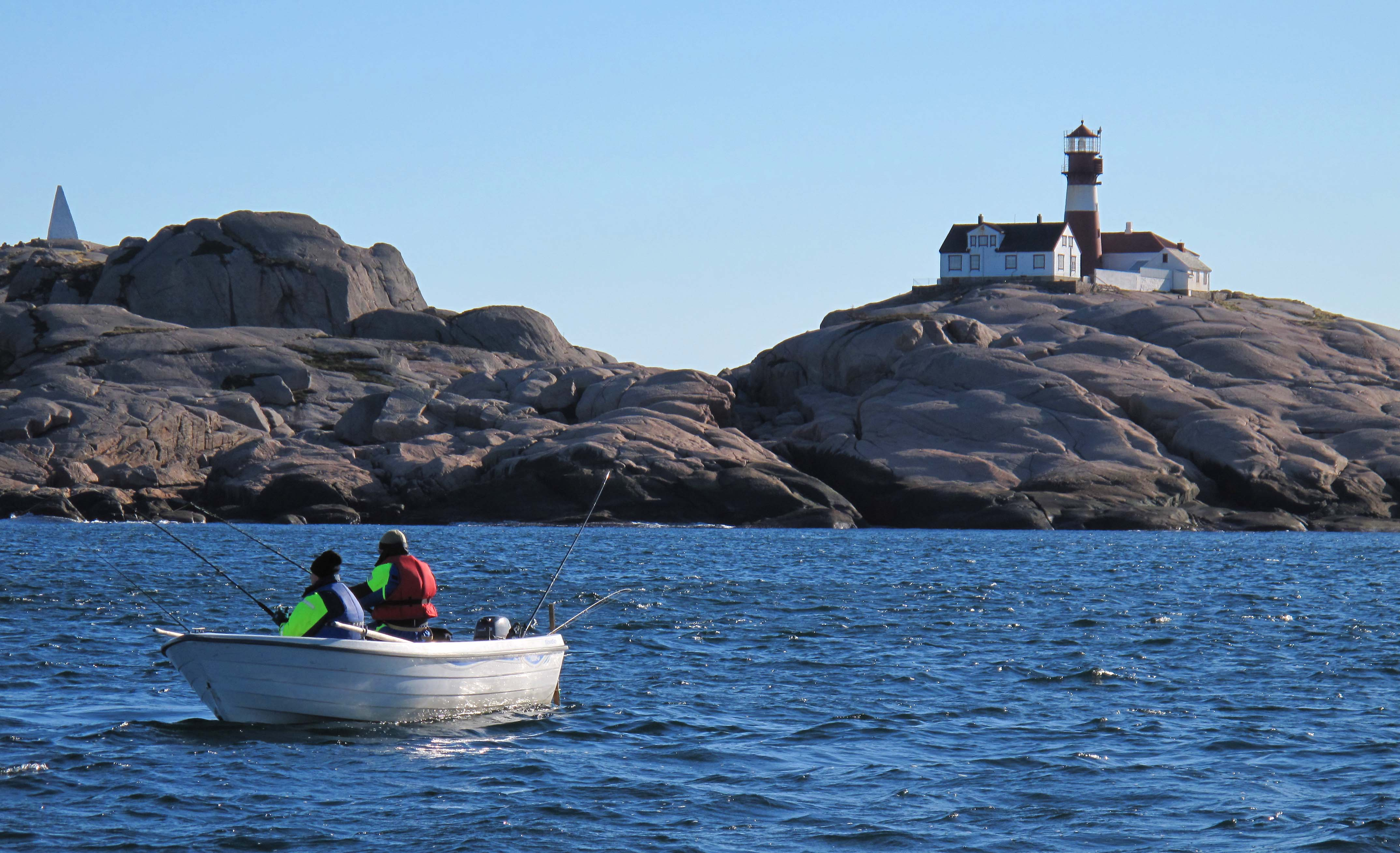
View of the lighthouse from the sea

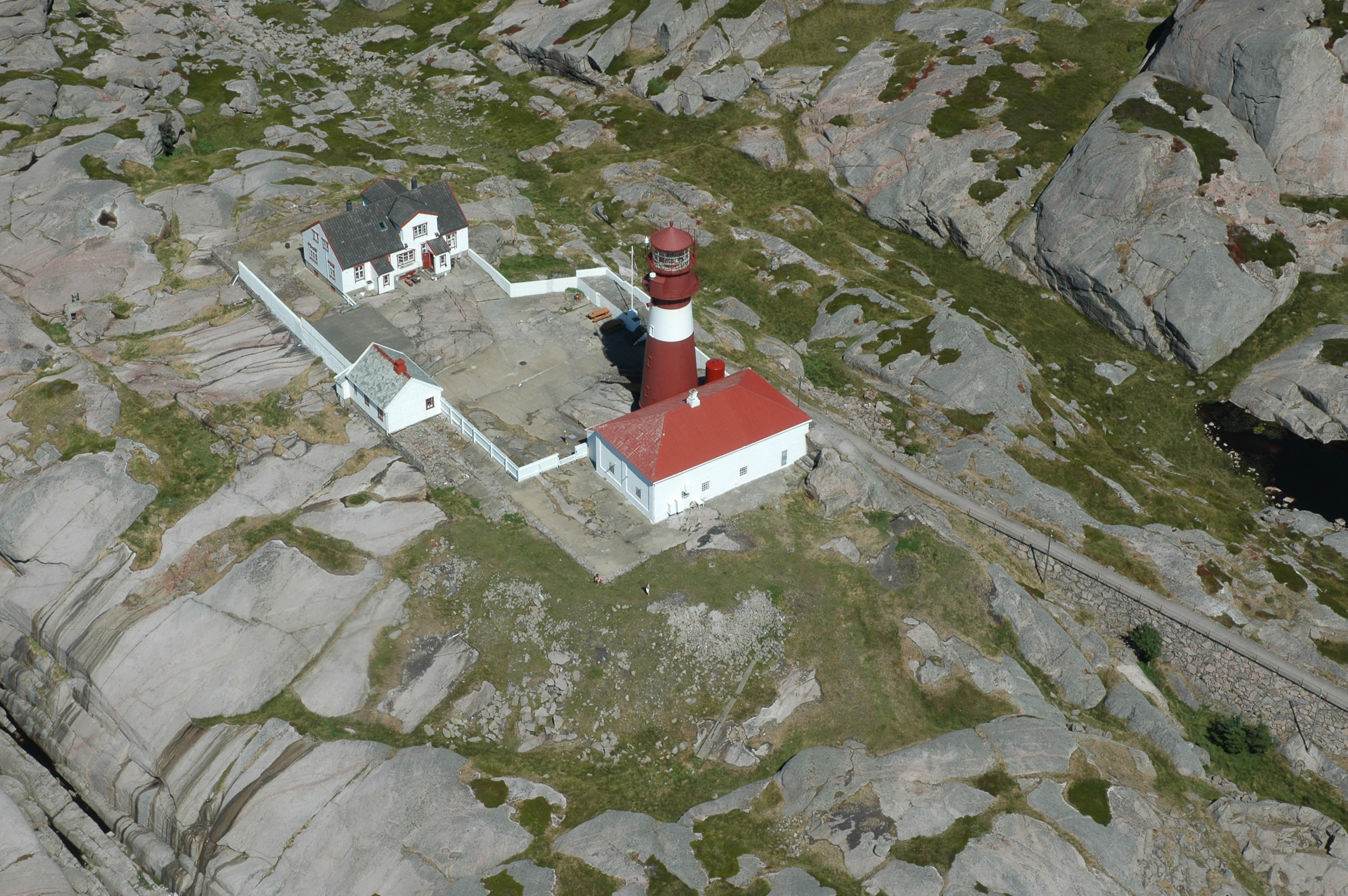
Aerial view of the lighthouse

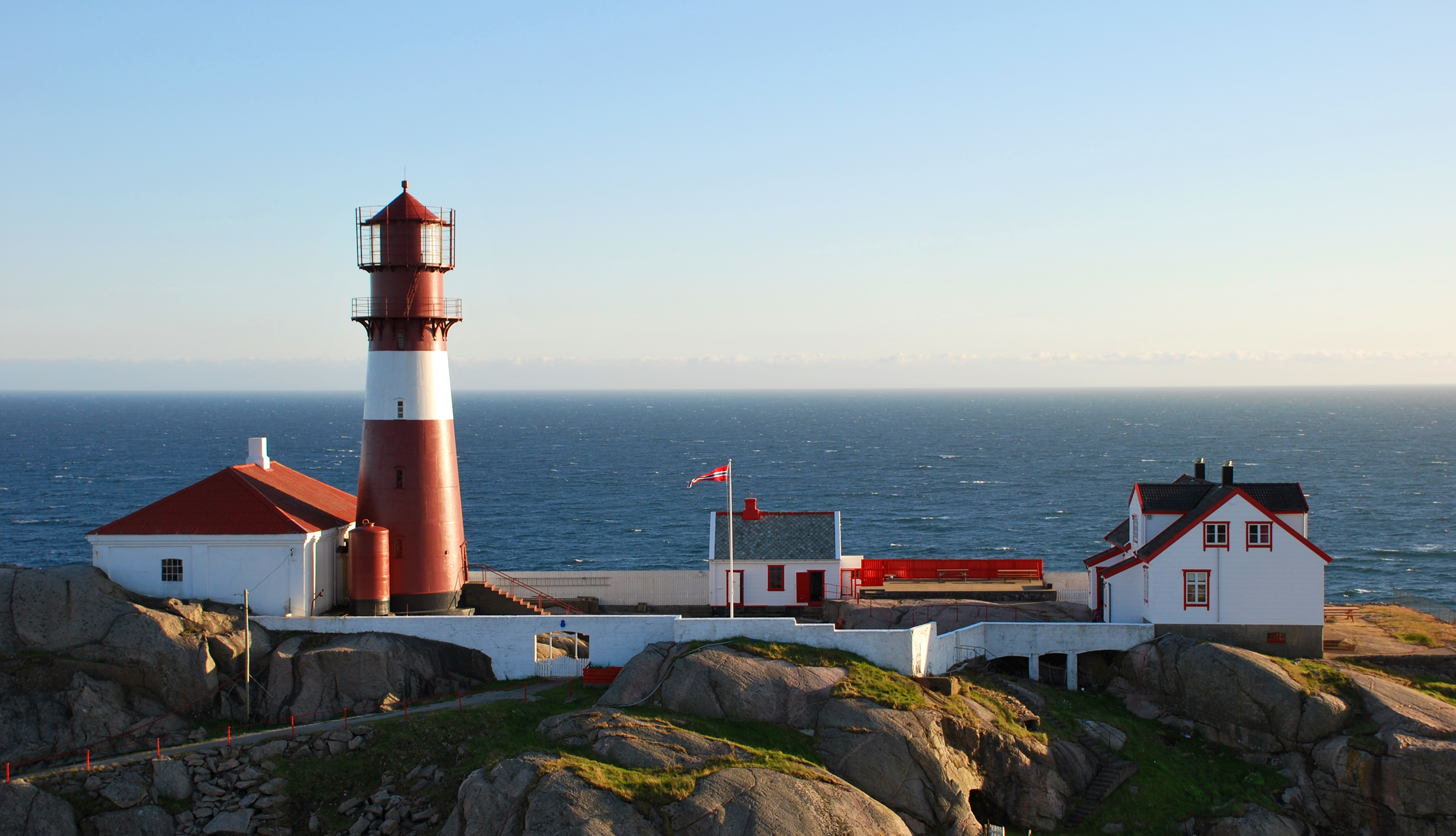
Close up view of the lighthouse

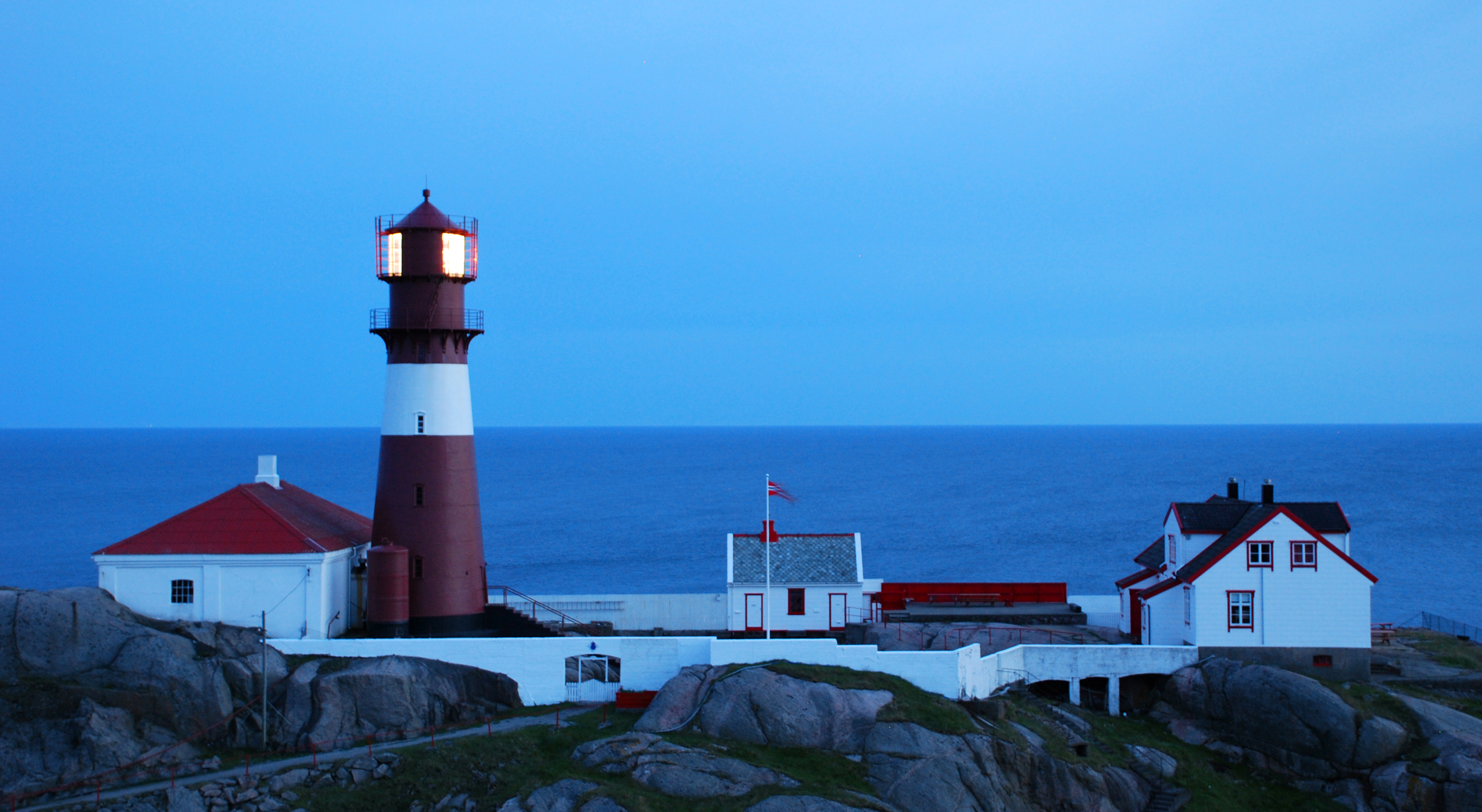
Evening view of the lighthouse

== See also ==
- Lighthouses in Norway
- List of lighthouses in Norway
