= Lindesnes =

Lindesnes may refer to:

== Places ==
- Lindesnes Municipality, a municipality in Agder county, Norway
- Lindesnes (peninsula), a peninsula in Lindesnes Municipality in Agder county, Norway
- Lindesnes Lighthouse, a lighthouse in Lindesnes Municipality in Agder county, Norway

== Other ==
- Lindesnes (newspaper), a newspaper serving parts of Agder county, Norway
- Lindesnes Region, a metropolitan-statistical region in Agder county, Norway
