= Skogsøy =

Island in Agder, Norway

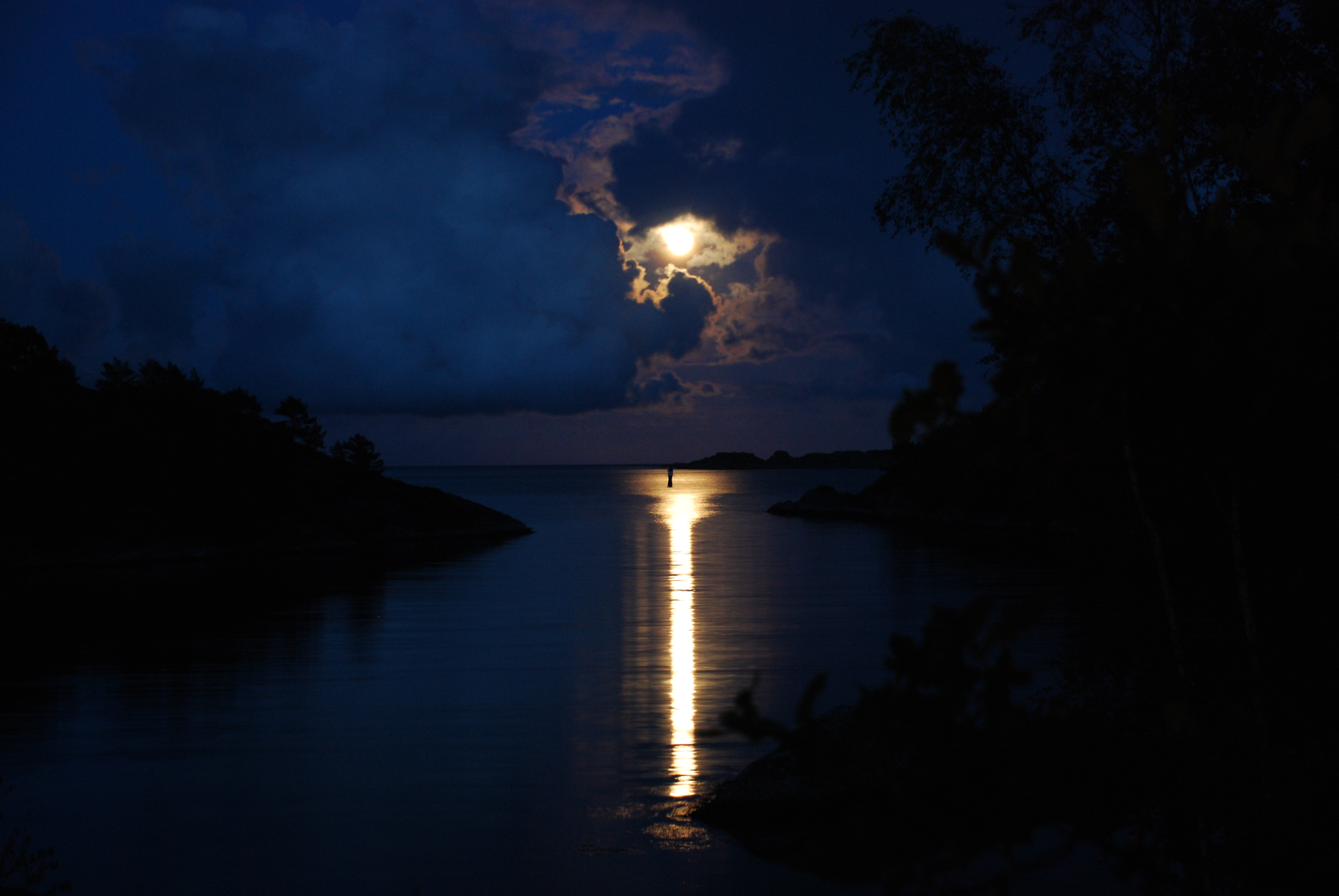
- View of the moonlight on Skogsøy
- Interactive map of the island

Geography
- Location: Agder, Norway
- Coordinates: 58.00741°N 7.59069°E
- Length: 900 m (3000 ft)
- Width: 900 m (3000 ft)
- Highest elevation: 72 m (236 ft)
- Highest point: Søreheia

Administration
- Norway
- County: Agder
- Municipality: Lindesnes Municipality

Skogsøy is an island in Lindesnes Municipality in Agder county, Norway. The island is separated from the mainland by the Skogsøysund strait which is about 500 metres (1,600 ft) long and about 30 to 70 metres (98 to 230 ft) wide. There is one bridge, Skogsøysundbrua, which connects the island to the mainland. The Skogsøysundbrua is 8 metres (26 ft) long and 2 metres (6 ft 7 in) above the water. The islands of Skjernøya and Pysen both lie about 3 kilometres (1.9 mi) to the west and southwest respectively.

The island has a long history, ranging hundreds of years back in time. The name "Skogsøy" could be directly translated to "forest island". Even though there is a considerable amount of forest on the island, it has nothing to do with the name.

Skogsøy is the original site of the company Skogsøy Båtbyggeri, a boat building company. Skogsøy Båtbyggeri was purchased by Båtservice Gruppen in 2006, and all boat production was moved off Skogsøy to other locations.

== See also ==
- List of islands of Norway
