= Knivskjelodden =

Northernmost point in Norway and Europe

- Peninsula
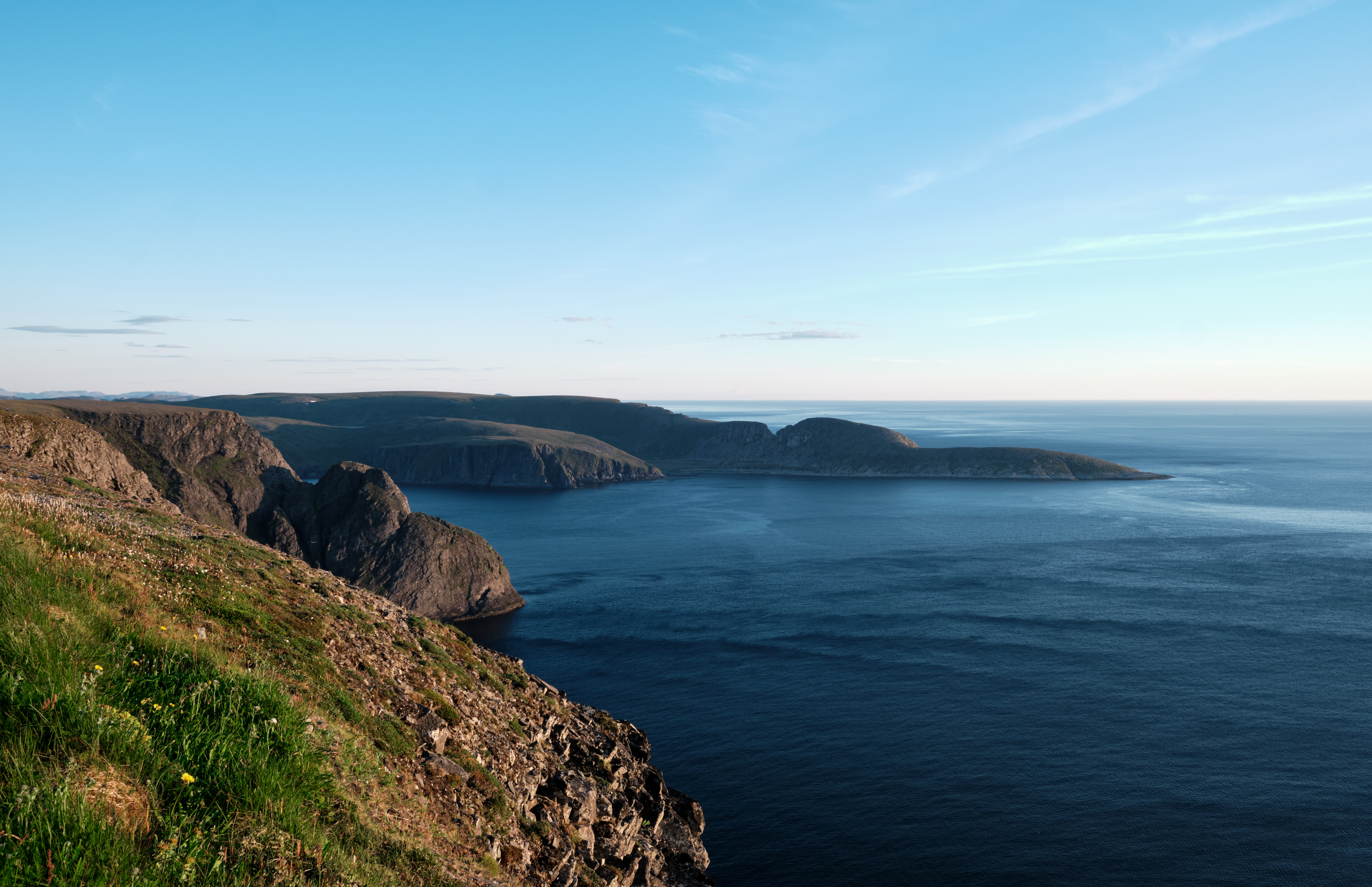
- Knivskjellodden as viewed from the North Cape plateau

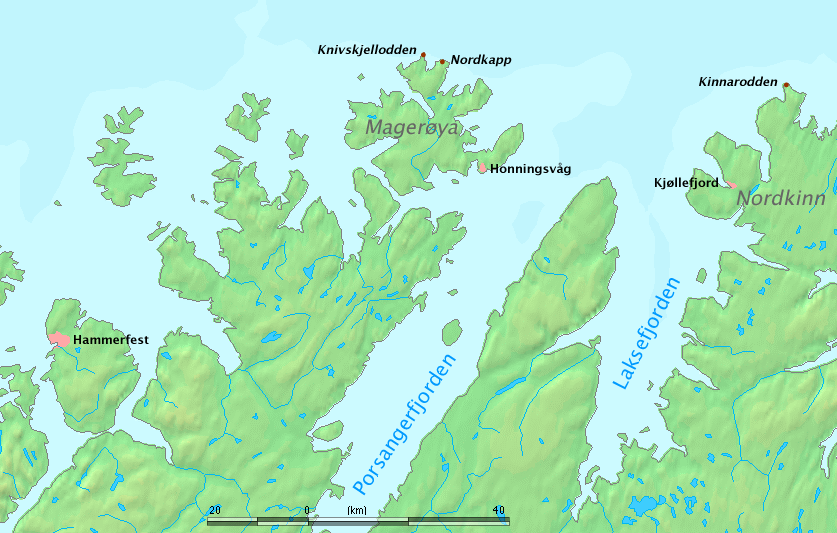
- Coordinates: 71°11′08″N 25°40′54″E
- Location: Finnmark, Norway
- Water bodies: Barents Sea
- Elevation: 0 ft (0 m)

Knivskjelodden is a peninsula located in Nordkapp Municipality in Finnmark county, Norway. It is the northernmost point on the island of Magerøya in Northern Norway. It is the northernmost point of continental Europe. The nearby Kinnarodden on the Nordkinn Peninsula is the northernmost point on the mainland. The northernmost point of the country Norway (with islands) is Rossøya, in Svalbard, as far north as 80°N.

Knivskjellodden can only be reached on foot, after a 9-kilometre (5.6 mi) long hike from a parking area near the European route E69 highway (71.122°N 25.71°E), 6 km (3.7 mi) south of North Cape. The North Cape tourist facility is located on an altitude of 300 meters and gives a good view of Knivskjellodden in good weather, but it often finds itself above the cloud base, which then conceals the peninsula. On Knivskjellodden, hikers can walk to the shore, which is at sea level, and at least see the ocean, but usually a view far out below the clouds as well.

Although travel agencies often organize trips for unaware tourists by advertising the North Cape (Nordkapp in Norwegian) as the northern extremity of Europe, this is not true, as Knivskjellodden is 1,450 metres (4,760 ft) further north.

== See also ==
- Lindesnes, southernmost point in Norway
- Extreme points of Europe
- Extreme points of Norway
- North Cape
- Nordkapp Municipality
