= Hatholmen Lighthouse =

Coastal lighthouse in Norway

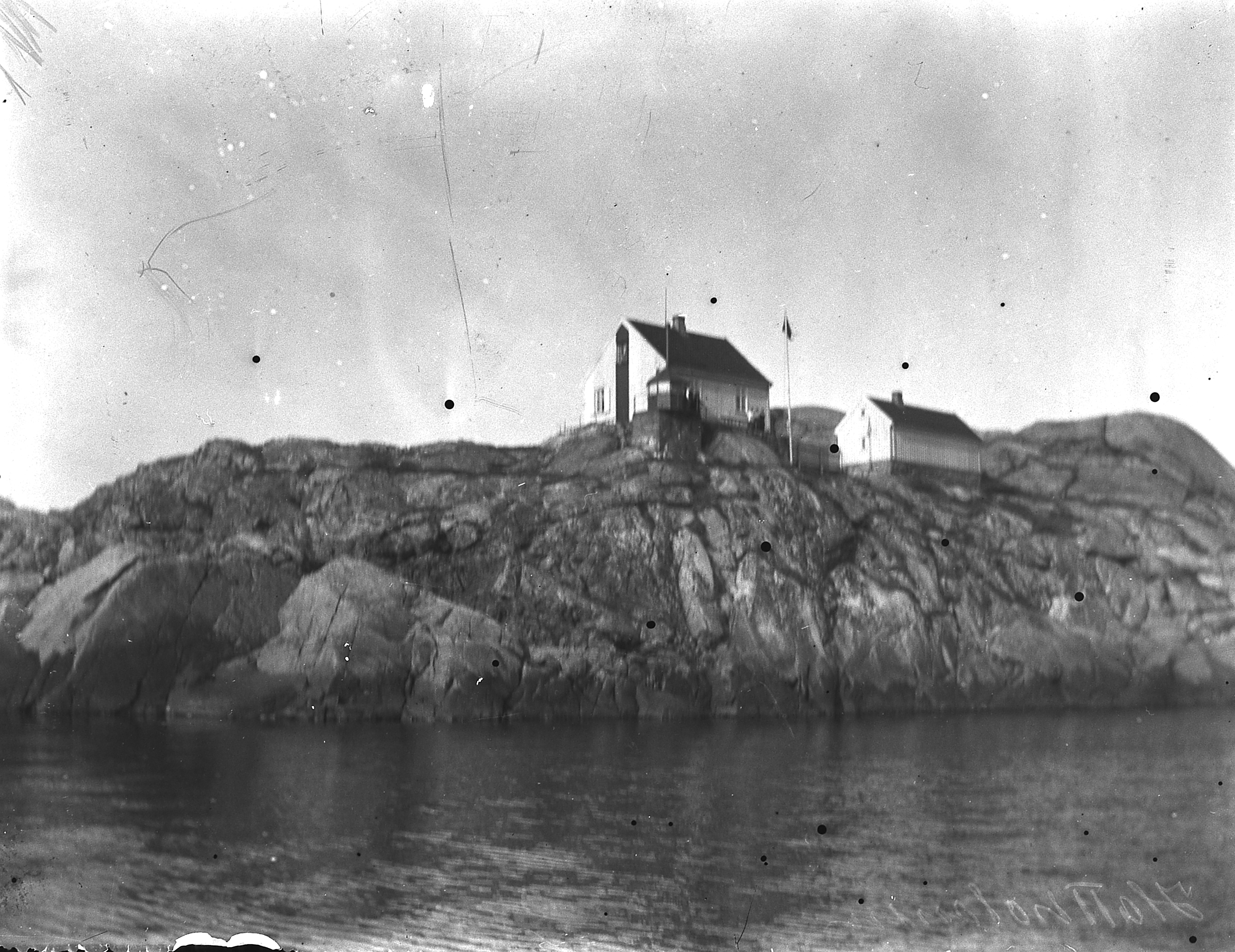
- Location: Agder, Norway
- Coordinates: 58°00′12″N 07°26′57″E

Tower
- Constructed: 1867
- Automated: 1984
- Height: 7.2 metres (24 ft)
- Shape: Cylindrical
- Markings: White with red roof
- Heritage: cultural property, cultural heritage preservation in Norway

Light
- Focal height: 19 metres (62 ft)
- Range: 8.62 nmi (15.96 km; 9.92 mi)
- Characteristic: Fl (2) WRG 10s
- Norway no.: 079100

Hatholmen Lighthouse (Norwegian: Hatholmen fyr) is a coastal lighthouse in Lindesnes Municipality in Agder county, Norway. The lighthouse sits on the tiny island of Hattholmen, about 2 kilometres (1.2 mi) south of the town of Mandal. The lighthouse marks the western side of the Mannefjorden which runs north to the town of Mandal (the Ryvingen Lighthouse marks the eastern side of the fjord.

The lighthouse was built in 1867 and it was unmanned and automated in 1984. The 7.2-metre (24 ft) tall lighthouse is white with a red roof and it is attached to a white 1 1/2-story keeper's house. The light on top sits at an elevation of 19 metres (62 ft) above the sea. The light emits two flashes of white, red, or green light (depending on direction) every 10 seconds. The light can be seen for up to 8.62 nautical miles (15.96 km; 9.92 mi). The lighthouse is only accessible by boat, but the buildings can be rented out for overnight accommodations.

== See also ==
- Lighthouses in Norway
- List of lighthouses in Norway
