= Geographical centre of Norway =

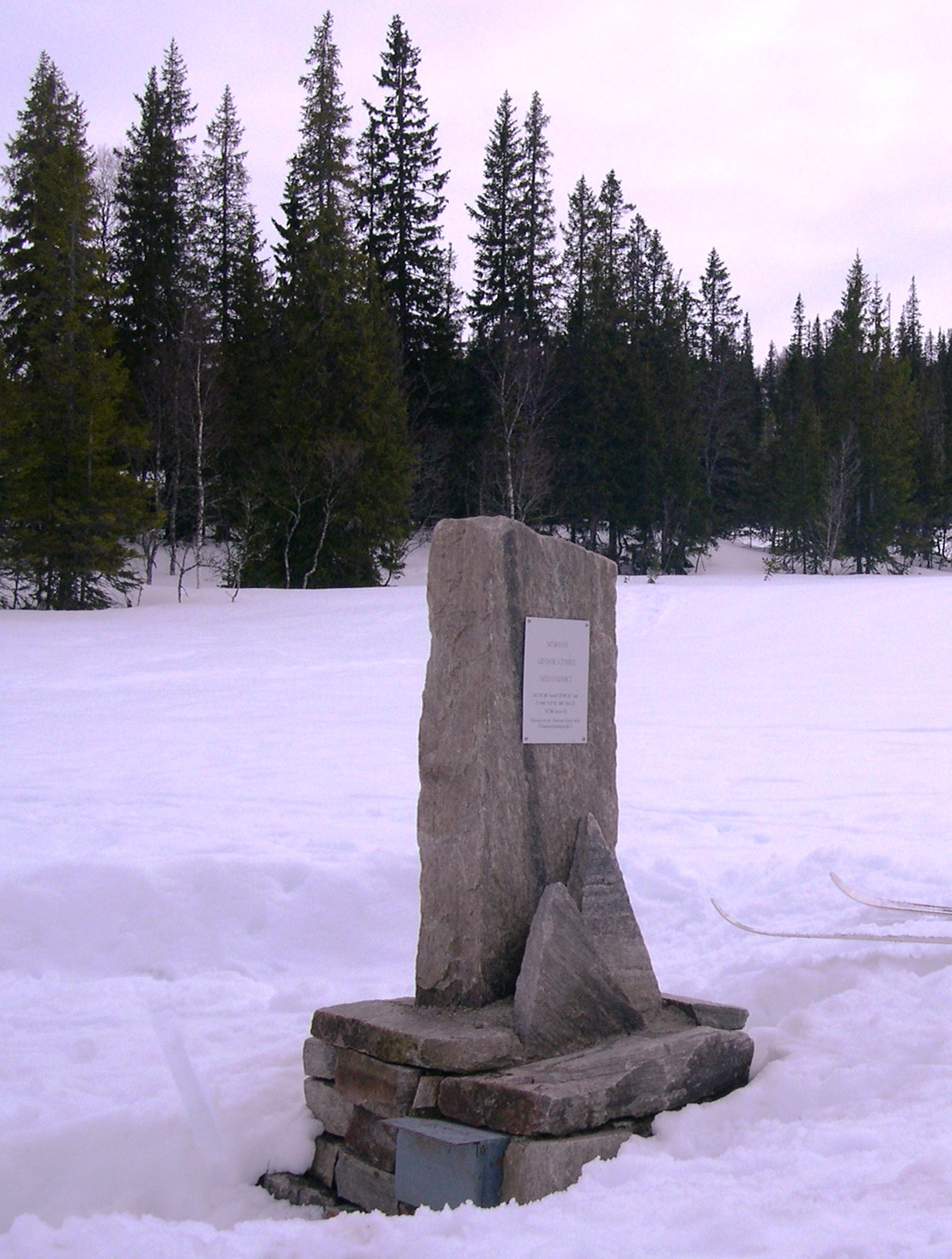
The Bauta at the Centre of Norway site. There are paths leading there both in summer and winter.

The geographical centre of Norway has been identified as a spot in the mountains at the southeastern end of the Ogndalen valley in the southeastern part of Steinkjer Municipality in Trøndelag county, located at 63°59′26″N 12°18′28″E. A monument marking the significance of the spot was unveiled in a ceremony on 3 September 2006, with the hope that it would become a tourist attraction. The site lies just to the west of the large lake Skjækervatnet.

== Method of calculation ==
Harald Stavestrand at the Norwegian Mapping and Cadastre Authority looked for the balancing point of mainland Norway with its islands, not including sea area, the overseas areas of Svalbard and Jan Mayen, or considering elevation. Stavestrand had feared that the centre would turn out to be in Sweden due to the curved shape of Norway, but it ultimately ended up within the borders of Norway.

== Other locations ==
Several other places have been claimed to be the centre of Norway, using differing methods. They include:

- Harran in Grong Municipality (halving the mainland's latitude "length")
- the village of Vilhelmina in Vilhelmina Municipality in Sweden (halving the great-circle distance)
- Grane Church in Grane Municipality (found by halving longer great circle distances)
- Alstahaug Church in Alstahaug Municipality (found by halving longer great circle distances)
- Mosjøen in Vefsn Municipality (midpoint along the road from Lindesnes at the southern tip of Norway to the North Cape at the northern tip of Norway)
