= Vardetangen =

Westernmost point of mainland Norway

- Promontory
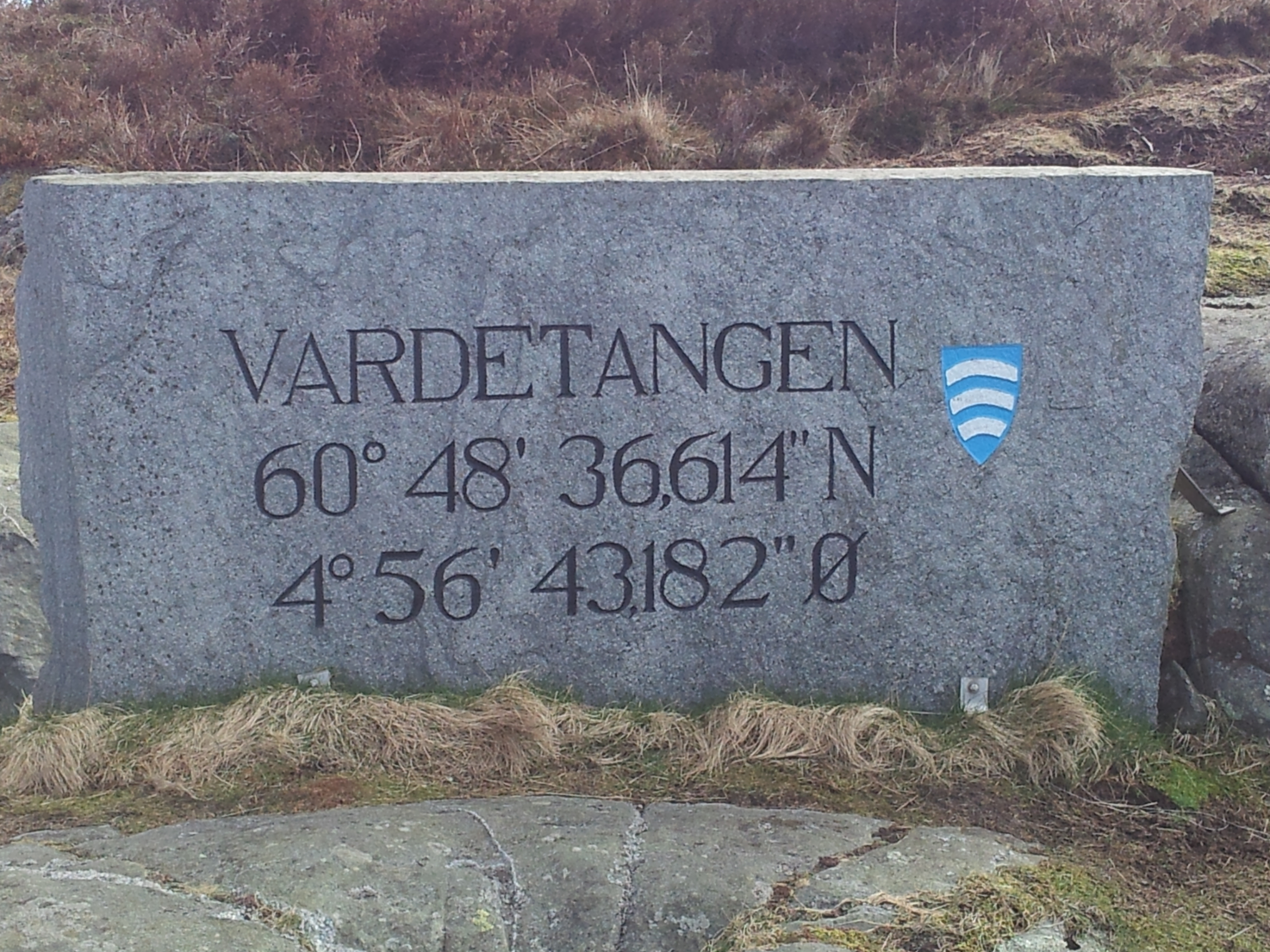
- Latitude and longitude marker at Vardetangen
- Interactive map of Vardetangen
- Coordinates: 60°48′36.614″N 4°56′43.182″E
- Location: Austrheim Municipality, Vestland, Norway

Vardetangen is the westernmost point of mainland Norway. It is located in Austrheim Municipality in Vestland county. It is on the Lindås peninsula, which juts out into the Fensfjorden. Although several islands lie further west of Vardetangen, this point is the furthest westerly extent of the Norwegian mainland.

A landmark marking the point is frequented by hikers, with a waymarked trail providing access by foot. Vardetangen can also be reached by road from Bergen or by boat through the "inner fairway" between Bergen and the Sognefjord.

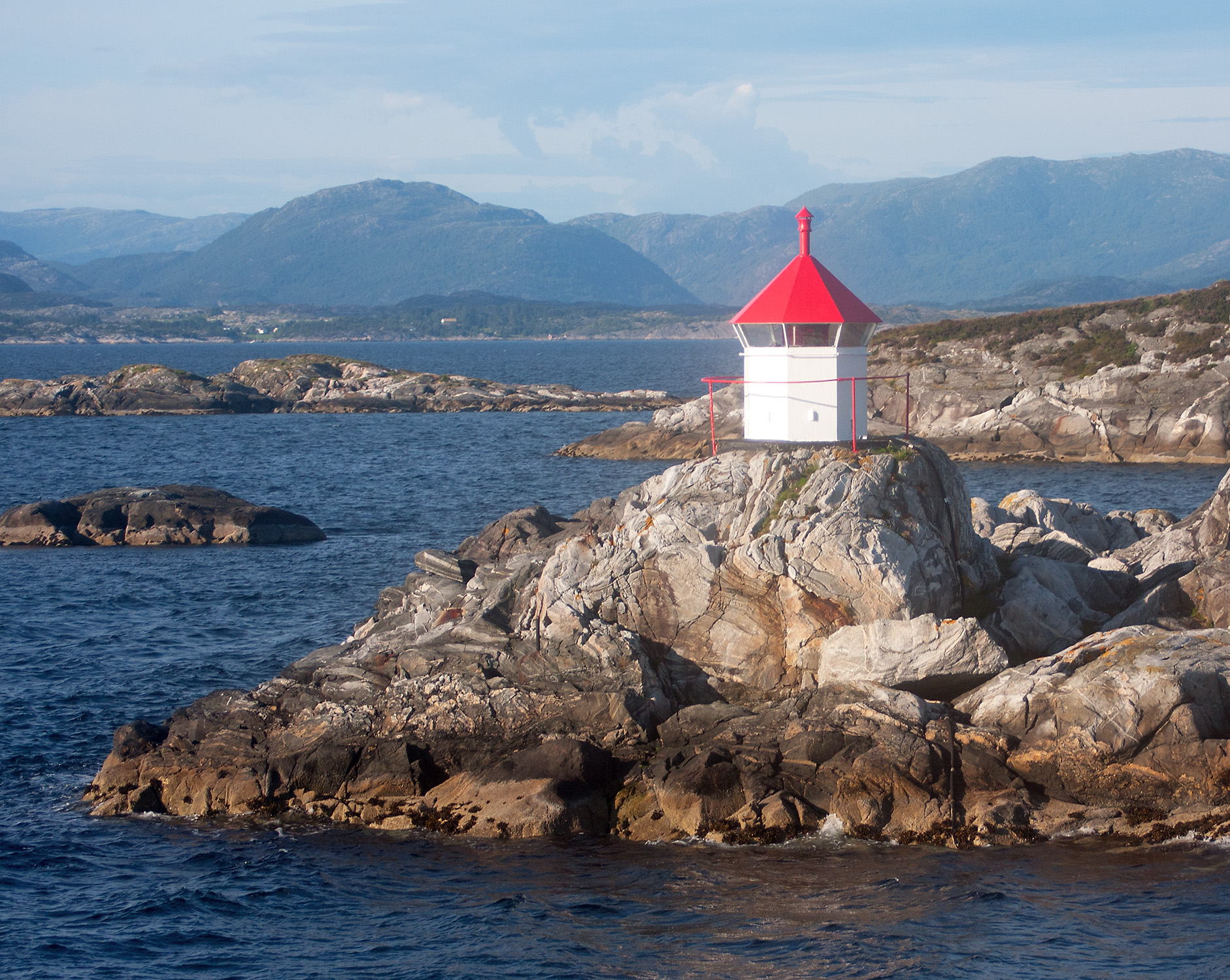
Lighthouse near Vardetangen

== Geography ==
Vardetangen is on a promontory on the Lindås peninsula that extends into the Fensfjorden of the North Sea. It is considered the westernmost point on the Norwegian mainland. Several nearby islands, such as Fedje and the Utvær islets, lie further west. The surrounding landscape features heathlands, inlets, and sheltered bays.

Administratively, Vardetangen is located within Austrheim Municipality in Vestland county. It is located about 3.8 kilometres (2.4 mi) west of the Mongstad industrial area.

== Access ==
Vardetangen is a popular destination for hikers due to its significance as the westernmost point of the Norwegian mainland. There is a waymarked trail of approximately 5 kilometres (3.1 mi) from Torvneset to Vardetangen. Beyond Vardetangen is Årvikane, a popular bathing spot with tables and public toilets nearby. The trail continues along the southwestern side of Fonnesvågen, past a lake, and loops back through farmland to Vardetangen.

Vardetangen is also accessible by road from Bergen and by boat on the so-called "inner fairway" between Bergen and the Sognefjord. Boats operated by Norled stop at the quay near Vardetangen, providing an alternative maritime route. There is a parking area at Vardetangen.
