= Kræmerpynten =

Headland of Kvitøya, Svalbard

Coordinates: 80°13.7′N 33°30.9′E

Kræmerpynten is the most eastern point of Kvitøya, Svalbard. The point is also the most eastern point of Norway, 33° 30' 59'' E. The name Kræmerpynten originates from captain and Spitsbergen trapper Waldemar Hilbert Kræmer.
