= Kibergsneset =

Peninsula in Vardø, Norway

- Peninsula
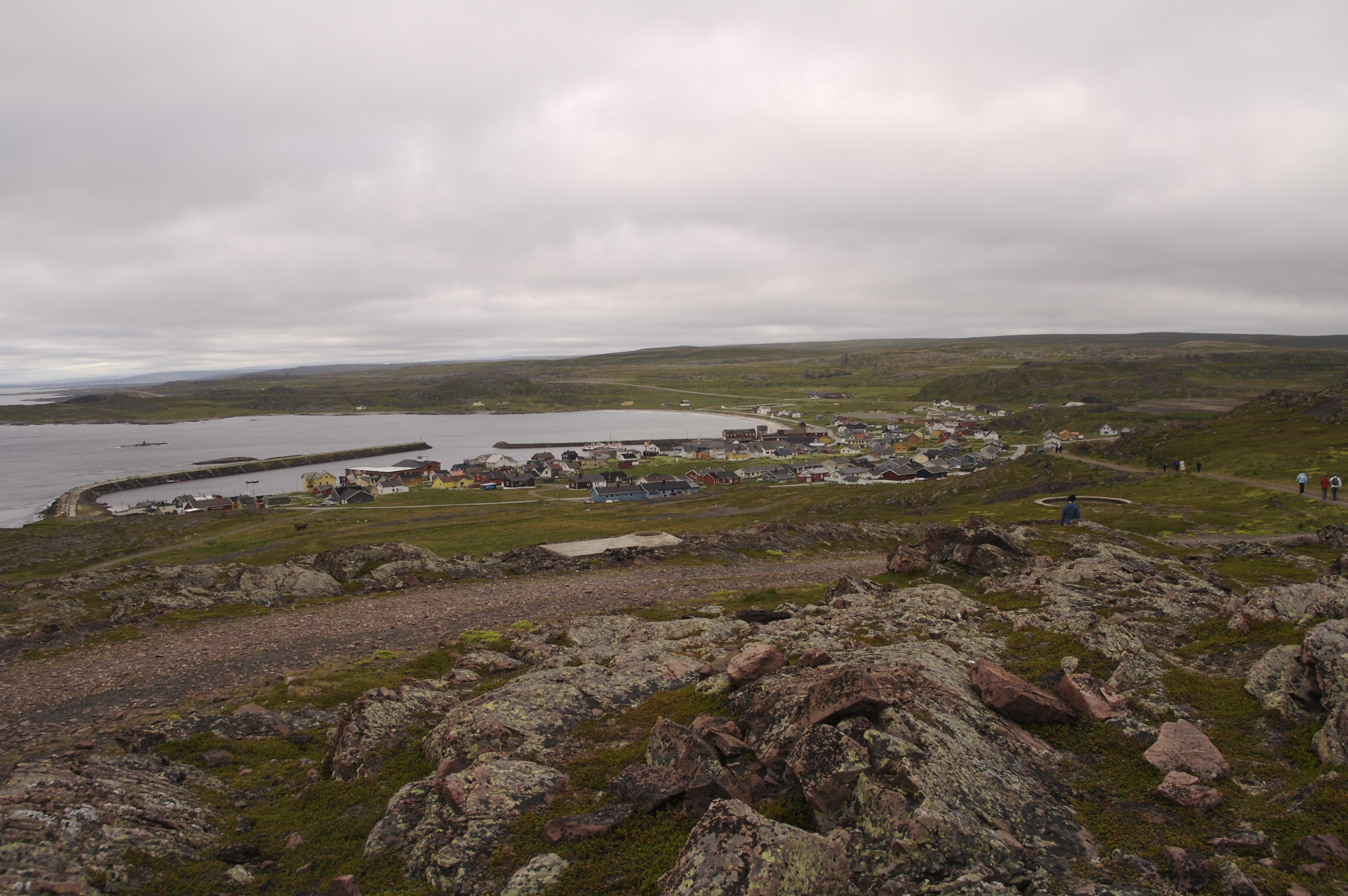
- View of Kiberg village on the southern side of the peninsula
- Interactive map of the lake
- Coordinates: 70°17′19″N 31°03′46″E
- Location: Finnmark, Norway
- Offshore water bodies: Barents Sea

Area
  - Total: 4 km^{2} (1.5 sq mi)

Kibergsneset is a peninsula in Vardø Municipality in Finnmark county, Norway. The small peninsula is located on the larger Varanger Peninsula along the Barents Sea. The village of Kiberg sits on the southwestern shore of the peninsula and the town of Vardø is located about 10 kilometres (6.2 mi) to the northeast.

There is a coastal fortress on the southeastern part of the peninsula. It was built by the occupying Germans during World War II. Kibergsneset is the easternmost point of mainland Norway.

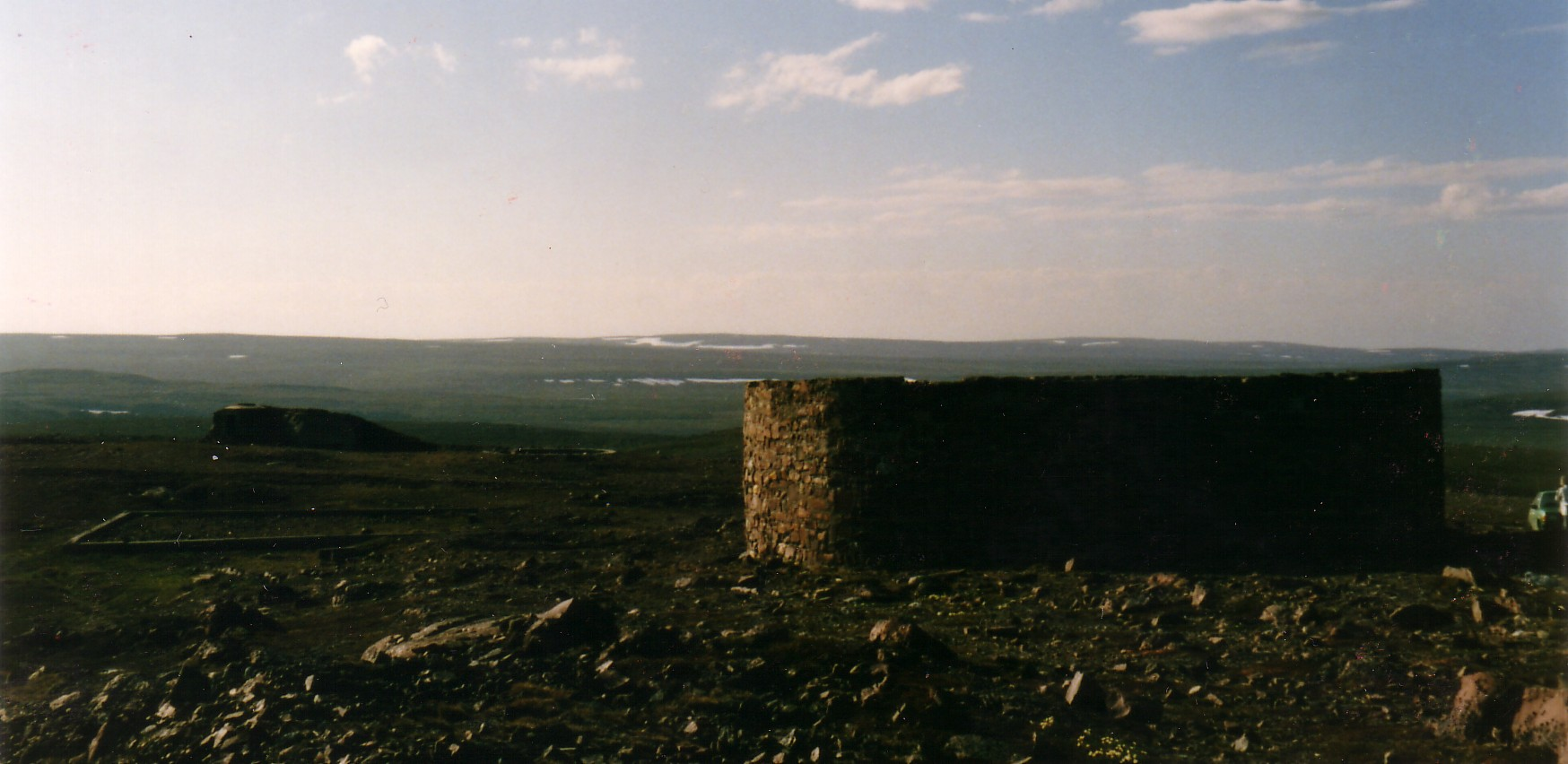
Some remains of the coastal fort of Kibergsneset
