= Høybergodden =

Most western point of Jan Mayen, Norway

Coordinates: 70°51.8′N 9°4.6′W

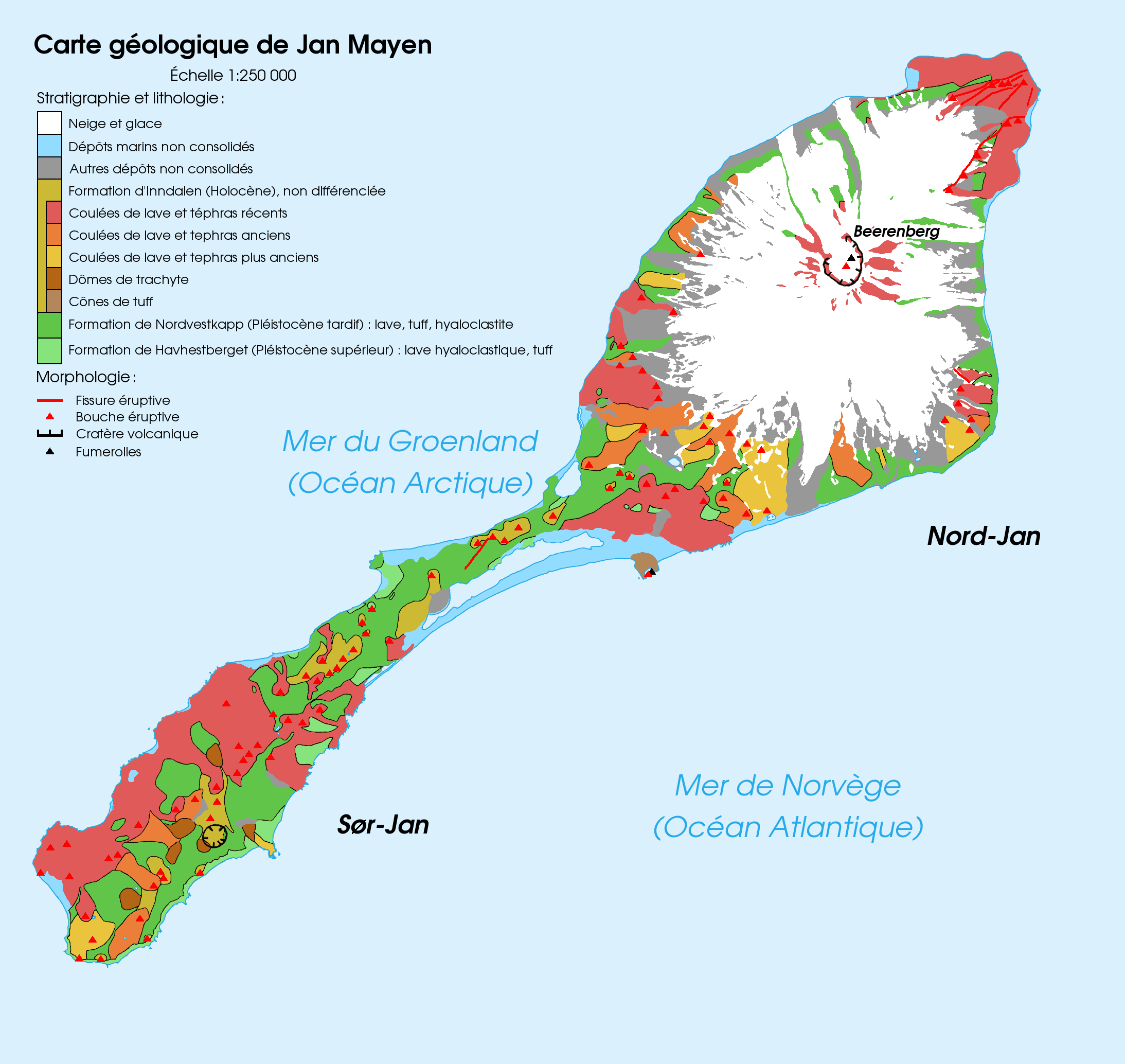
Map of Jan Mayen

Høybergodden, officially Hoybergodden, is the most western point of the volcanic island of Jan Mayen. The name refers to the nearby volcanic crater of Hoyberg (from the Dutch for haystack).

The point is also the most western point of the Kingdom of Norway.
