= Cape Nordkinn =

Northernmost point of mainland Europe

Cape Nordkinn: Kinnarodden (Norwegian); Gidnegeahči (Northern Sami)
- Cape
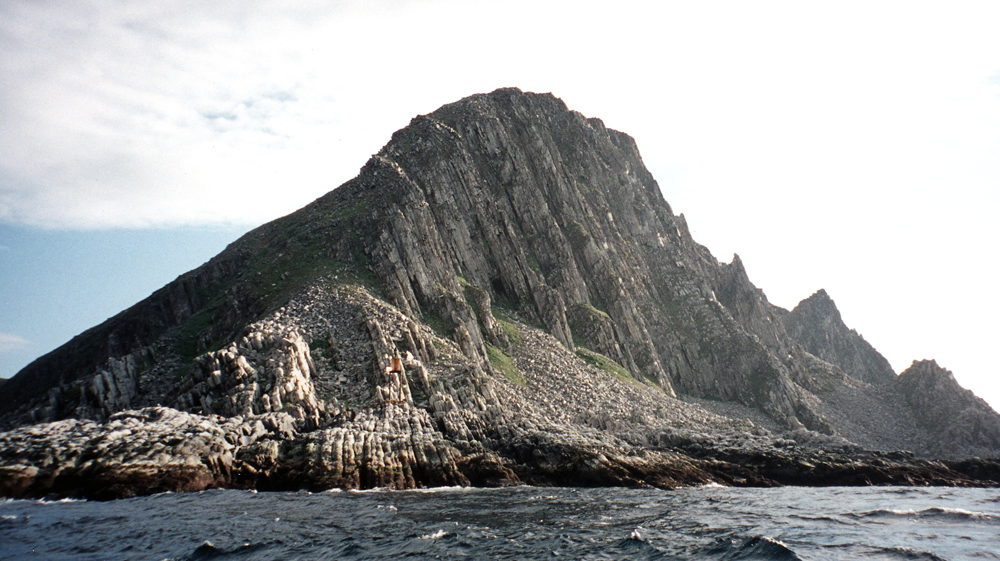
- View of Kinnarodden

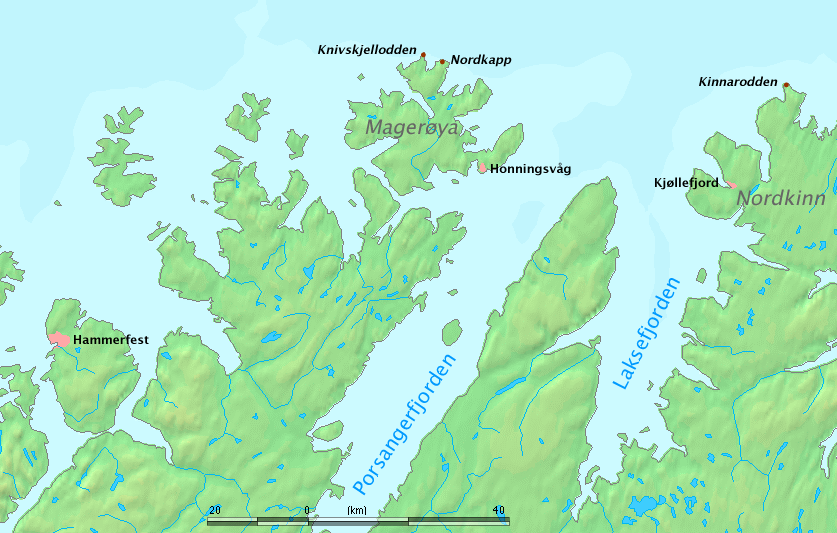
- Kinnarodden (right) is on mainland, North Cape (Nordkapp, center) is on an island.
- Coordinates: 71°08′02″N 27°39′00″E
- Location: Finnmark, Norway
- Water bodies: Barents Sea
- Elevation: 237 m (778 ft)

Cape Nordkinn (Norwegian: Kinnarodden or Northern Sami: Gidnegeahči) at 71°8′2″N 27°39′0″E is the northernmost point on the Nordkinn Peninsula in Finnmark county, Norway. It is notable for being the northernmost point of mainland Norway, and by extension the northernmost point of mainland Europe. The cape is located on the border of Gamvik Municipality and Lebesby Municipality.

== Geography ==
Cape Nordkinn is the northern tip of the fractal peninsula within the northernmost part of the Nordkinn Peninsula, about 14 kilometres (9 mi) in a straight line northwest from the village of Mehamn.

The famous North Cape (Nordkapp or more precisely Knivskjelodden) at 71.1834°N 25.6753°E, is about 5.7 kilometres (3.5 mi) further north than Cape Nordkinn, and it is branded as Europe's "official" northernmost point, although it is on an island that is just offshore of the mainland.

== Tourism ==
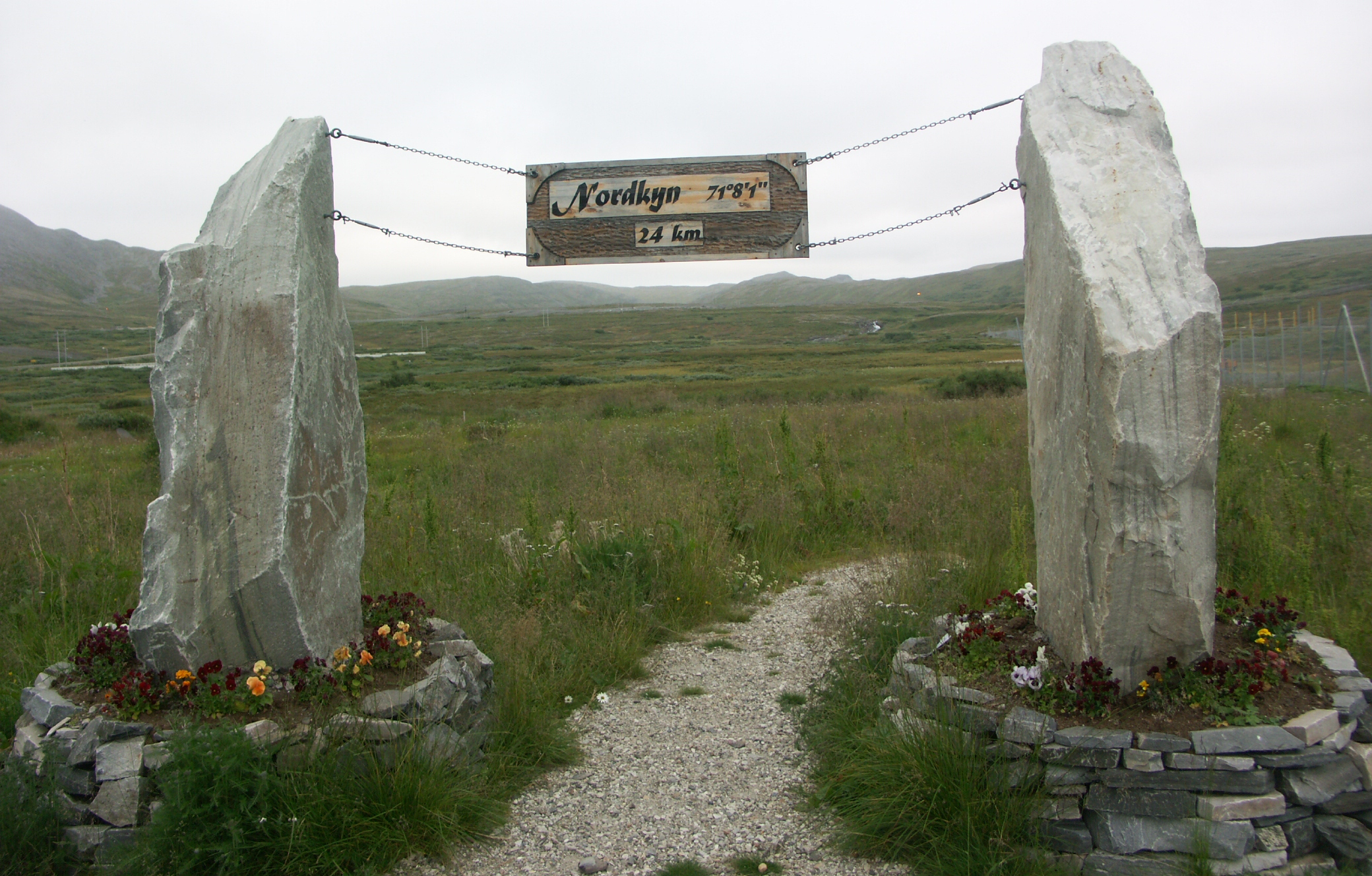
Signpost at Mehamn Airport. The trail was opened by Crown Princess Mette-Marit in 2004 to promote tourism.

In sharp contrast to North Cape with its extensive tourist infrastructure and busloads of visitors, Cape Nordkinn is a lonely but impressive place that can only be visited following at least a full-day hike from Mehamn and one day back. The terrain is sufficiently difficult for hiking, consisting largely of several kilometers long rock fields, that it is advisable to prepare for more than two days for the round trip, since it is 24 kilometres (15 mi) one way. There is no actual trail, only erected poles and cairns at rather long distances apart.

It is advisable not to travel in rainy weather, as the slippery stones make the terrain very difficult, with sudden fogs and associated whiteout. In fog the orientation on the highland south of the cape can be impossible without a GPS. There is mobile phone coverage in the area, except on west facing slopes.

The cape can also be reached by boat tours. The tourist bureau of Gamvik Municipality provides tourist information. Hurtigruten ships call at Mehamn and Kjøllefjord to the southwest of the cape, providing a sighting opportunity for visitors on the way.
