= Lindesnes (newspaper) =

Norwegian newspaper

- Type: Daily newspaper
- Owner(s): Fædrelandsvennen AS
- Editor: Gunvald Justnæs
- Founded: 1889
- Headquarters: Mandal
- Circulation: 6,401
- Website: www.lindesnes-avis.no

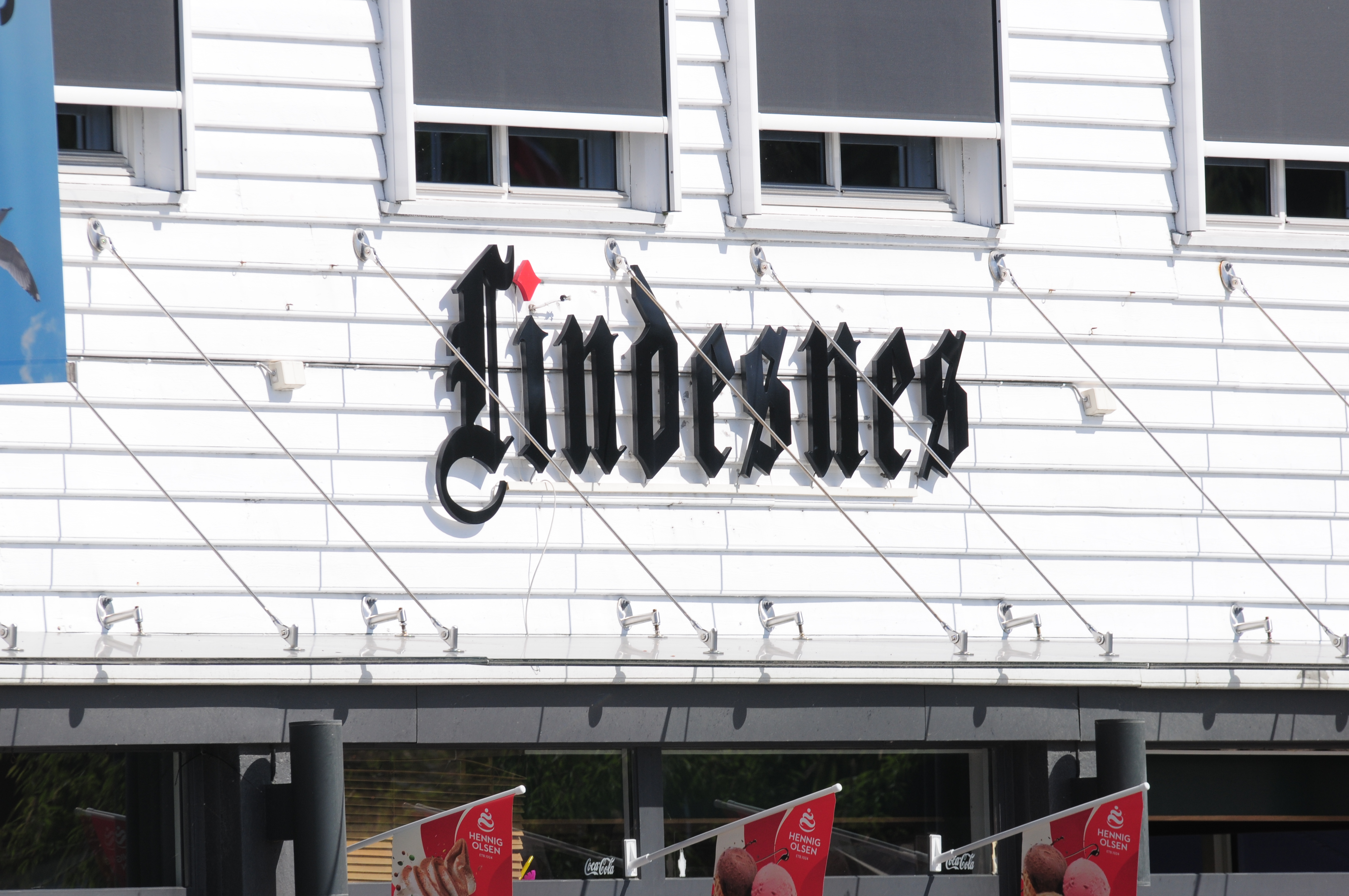
The editorial office of Lindesnes newspaper

Lindesnes is a local newspaper published in Mandal, Norway. It covers central Agder. It was established in 1889.

It has a circulation of 6,401, of whom 6,211 are subscribers.

Lindesnes is published by Lindesnes AS, which is owned 100% by Fædrelandsvennen AS, which is in turn by Schibsted.
