= Lindesnes Lighthouse =

Coastal lighthouse in Norway

Lindesnes Lighthouse Lindesnes fyr
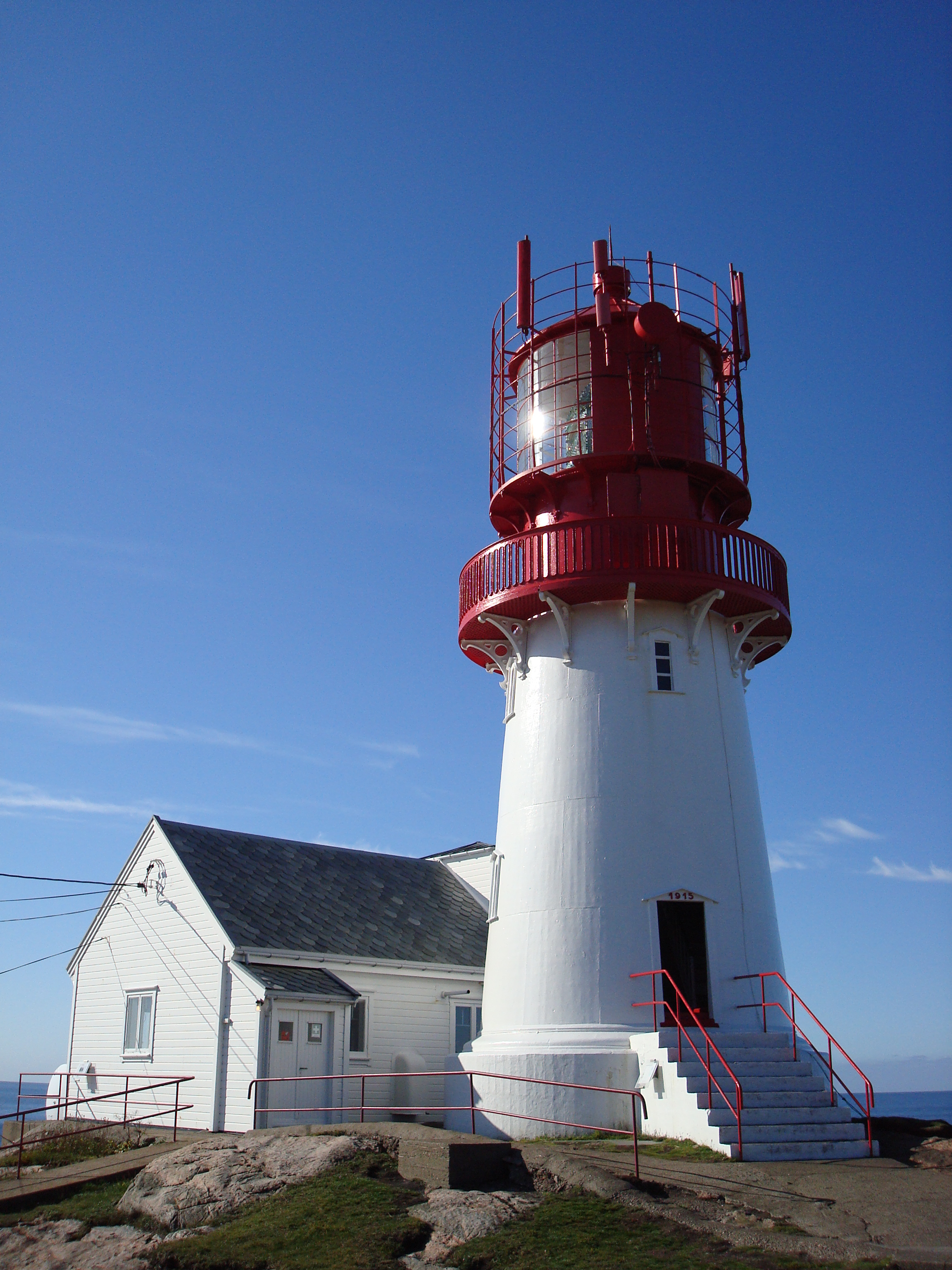
- Location: Lindesnes Municipality, Lindesnes Municipality, Norway
- Coordinates: 57°58′57″N 7°02′48″E

Tower
- Constructed: 1915
- Construction: cast iron (tower), granite (foundation)
- Automated: 2003
- Height: 16.1 m (53 ft)
- Shape: cylinder
- Markings: White (tower), red (lantern)
- Heritage: cultural property

Light
- Focal height: 50 m (160 ft), 50.1 m (164 ft)
- Lens: first order Fresnel lens
- Range: 18 nmi (33 km; 21 mi)
- Characteristic: FFl W 20s

Lindesnes Lighthouse (Norwegian: Lindesnes fyr) is a coastal lighthouse at the southernmost tip of Norway, about 10 kilometres (6.2 mi) southwest of the village of Høllen in Lindesnes Municipality in Agder county. The present lighthouse was built at the southern tip of the Lindesnes peninsula in 1915, although the station was first built in 1656 to mark the entrance to the Skagerrak and the Baltic Sea from the North Sea. The current 16.1-metre (53 ft) tall lighthouse is cast iron with a granite foundation. The lighthouse is painted white, with a red top. The light sits at an elevation of 50.1 metres (164 ft) and it emits a fixed and flashing white light that is always on and it rotates between a low intensity and high intensity light every 20 seconds. The light comes from a first order Fresnel lens that can be seen for up to 17.7 nautical miles (32.8 km; 20.4 mi).

== History ==
The lighthouse was first built in 1656, and over the centuries, several more were built to replace the older ones. In 1822, the lighthouse was refitted with a coal lamp, and in 1854, a new lamp was installed with the current lens. The current cast iron tower was set up in 1915 and fitted with the old Fresnel lens. In 1920, the lighthouse station got its first fog signal, a siren. The fog signal and its machinery is placed in a building beside the tower.

During World War II, the lighthouse was taken over by the Germans. Being an important watchpoint, the Germans built a small fortress with four guns and, after a while, a radar antenna. The traces from World War II are still visible as trenches, tunnels, and other fortifications.

In the 1950s, the lighthouse station was electrified and the fog signal was replaced with a powerful Diaphone. The fog signal was closed as a navigational aid in 1988, but it is still operational and is used on special occasions.

The lighthouse was selected as the millennium site for Vest-Agder county.

== Museum ==
Lindesnes Lighthouse is owned by the Norwegian Coastal Administration and is still active. It is also a museum, operated by the non-profit Lindesnes Lighthouse Museum Foundation. In addition to the buildings belonging to the lighthouse, keeper's cottages, sheds, and boathouses, Lindesnes Lighthouse also has a visitor centre inside the nearby mountain with exhibitions, a cinema hall and a cafeteria. There is also a museum shop.

Lindesnes Lighthouse Museum is a part of the National Museums of Coastal Infrastructure, Kystmusea, together with Tungenes Lighthouse outside Stavanger, Dalsfjord Lighthouse museum in Sunnmøre, and the Lofoten Museum in Kabelvåg. Kystmusea cooperates closely with the Norwegian Coastal Administration.

== Climate ==
Climate data for Lindesnes Lighthouse 1991-2020 (extremes 1954-2020)
Month	Jan	Feb	Mar	Apr	May	Jun	Jul	Aug	Sep	Oct	Nov	Dec	Year
Record high °C (°F)	10.2 (50.4)	9.5 (49.1)	14.9 (58.8)	18 (64)	23.2 (73.8)	26.4 (79.5)	27 (81)	27.3 (81.1)	21.3 (70.3)	16.6 (61.9)	13.7 (56.7)	11.4 (52.5)	27.3 (81.1)
Mean daily maximum °C (°F)	4.5 (40.1)	3.7 (38.7)	5 (41)	8.2 (46.8)	12.1 (53.8)	15.1 (59.2)	17.7 (63.9)	18.2 (64.8)	15.4 (59.7)	11.4 (52.5)	7.9 (46.2)	5.7 (42.3)	10.4 (50.8)
Daily mean °C (°F)	2.9 (37.2)	2 (36)	3.2 (37.8)	6.1 (43.0)	9.9 (49.8)	13 (55)	15.6 (60.1)	16.2 (61.2)	13.6 (56.5)	9.8 (49.6)	6.3 (43.3)	4 (39)	8.5 (47.4)
Mean daily minimum °C (°F)	1.2 (34.2)	0.5 (32.9)	1.6 (34.9)	4.4 (39.9)	8.1 (46.6)	11.2 (52.2)	13.9 (57.0)	14.4 (57.9)	11.9 (53.4)	8.1 (46.6)	4.7 (40.5)	2.3 (36.1)	6.9 (44.3)
Record low °C (°F)	−18.1 (−0.6)	−15.1 (4.8)	−11 (12)	−5.5 (22.1)	0.6 (33.1)	4.5 (40.1)	6 (43)	7.8 (46.0)	3.6 (38.5)	−1.6 (29.1)	−8.3 (17.1)	−16.5 (2.3)	−18.1 (−0.6)
Average precipitation mm (inches)	131.2 (5.17)	99.7 (3.93)	87.5 (3.44)	69 (2.7)	63.5 (2.50)	71.9 (2.83)	81.8 (3.22)	101.3 (3.99)	119.1 (4.69)	151.6 (5.97)	132.4 (5.21)	135.2 (5.32)	1,244.2 (48.97)
Average precipitation days	17	13	13	10	10	9	10	12	14	16	16	17	157
Source 1: yr.no/Norwegian Meteorological Institute
Source 2: NOAA - WMO averages 91-2020 Norway

== See also ==
- List of lighthouses in Norway
- Lighthouses in Norway
- Extreme points of Norway
