= Pysen =

Skerry in Agder, Norway

- Interactive map of the island

Geography
- Location: Agder, Norway
- Coordinates: 57.95851°N 7.56452°E
- Area: 250 m^{2} (2,700 sq ft)

Administration
- Norway
- County: Agder
- Municipality: Lindesnes Municipality

Demographics
- Population: 0

Pysen is a small, unpopulated skerry in Lindesnes Municipality in Agder county, Norway. Pysen is the southernmost point of Norway proper. The 250-square-metre (2,700 sq ft) skerry of Pysen is located about 2.5 kilometres (1.6 mi) southeast of the small island of Skjernøya (the southernmost inhabited island of Norway).

== See also ==
- List of islands of Norway
- Extreme points of Norway
