= Skjernøya =

Island in Agder, Norway

Skjernøya Skjernøy
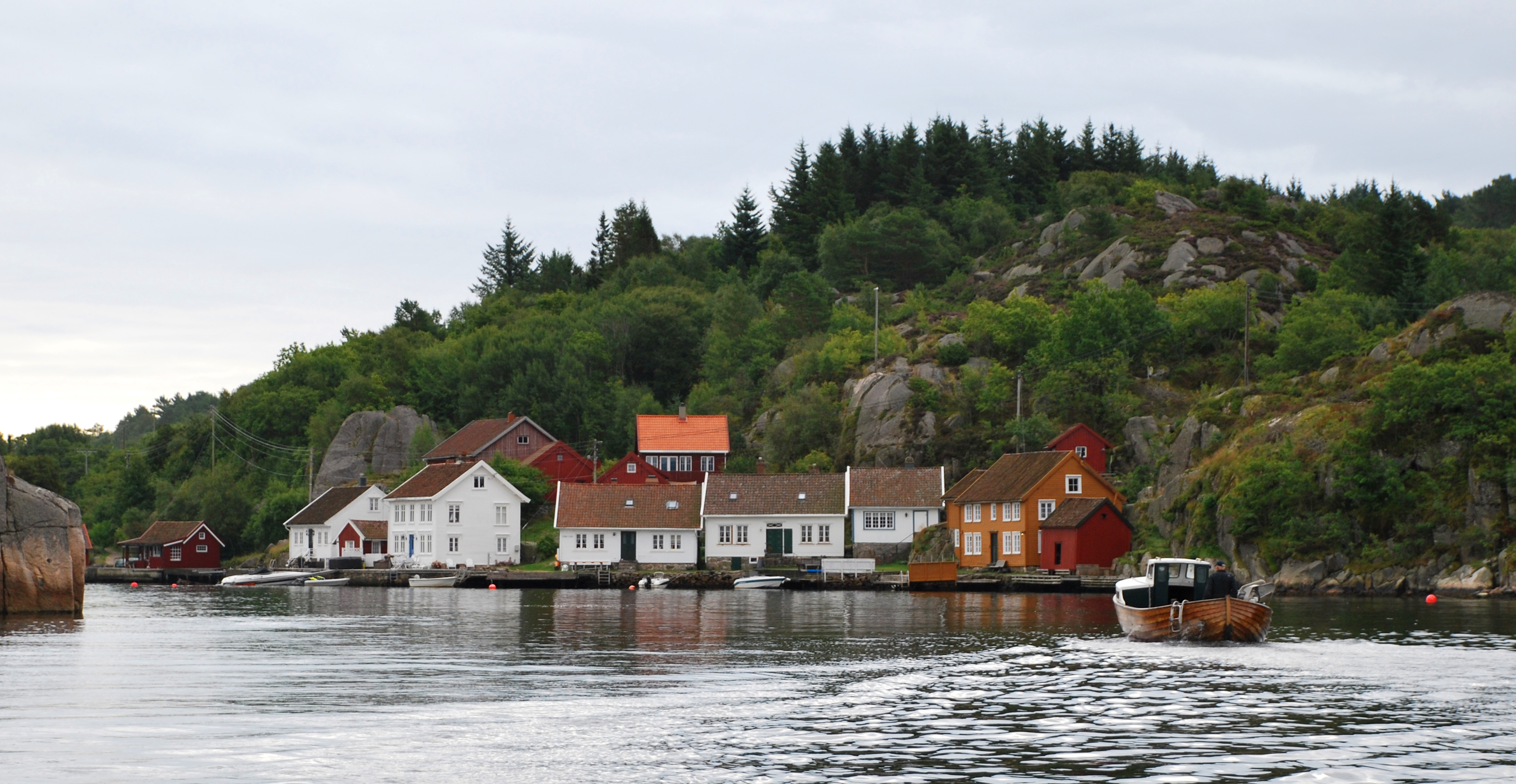
- View of the northern part of the island
- Interactive map of the island

Geography
- Location: Agder, Norway
- Coordinates: 57.994°N 7.51557°E
- Area: 5.6 km^{2} (2.2 sq mi)
- Length: 3.3 km (2.05 mi)
- Width: 3.2 km (1.99 mi)
- Highest elevation: 95 m (312 ft)

Administration
- Norway
- County: Agder
- Municipality: Lindesnes Municipality

Skjernøya is an island in Lindesnes Municipality in Agder county, Norway. The 5.6-square-kilometre (2.2 sq mi) island is the southernmost inhabited island in Norway. The island sits about 5 kilometres (3.1 mi) southeast of the town of Mandal, about 3 kilometres (1.9 mi) west of the island of Skogsøy, and about 3 kilometres (1.9 mi) north of the small island of Pysen. The island of Skjernøya is connected to the mainland by the Skjernøysund Bridge. The island has about 400 residents, a school, and a chapel.
