= North Cape (Norway) =

Headland on Magerøya in Northern Norway

North Cape Nordkapp
- Cape
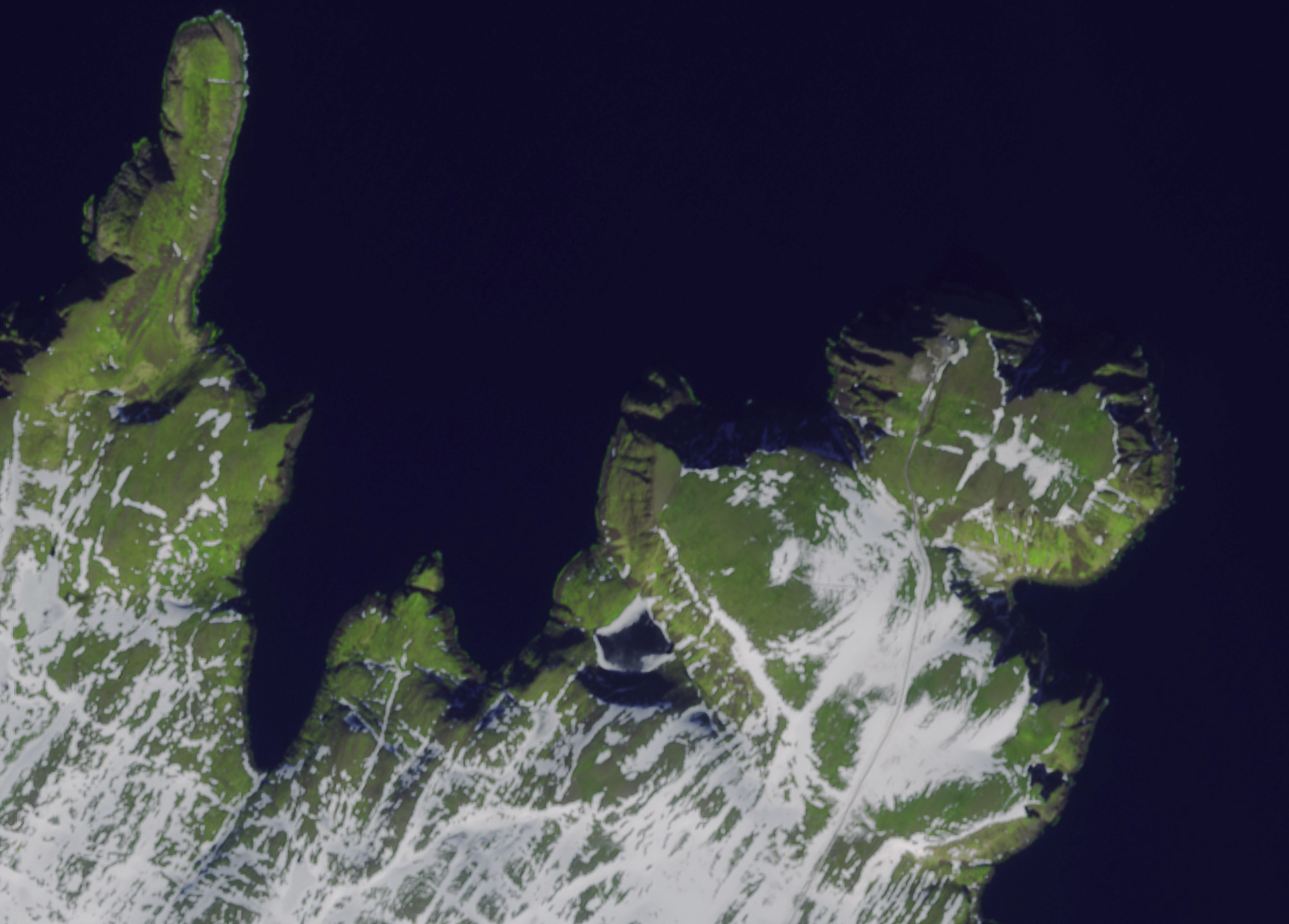
- A Sentinel-2 satellite image of the North Cape

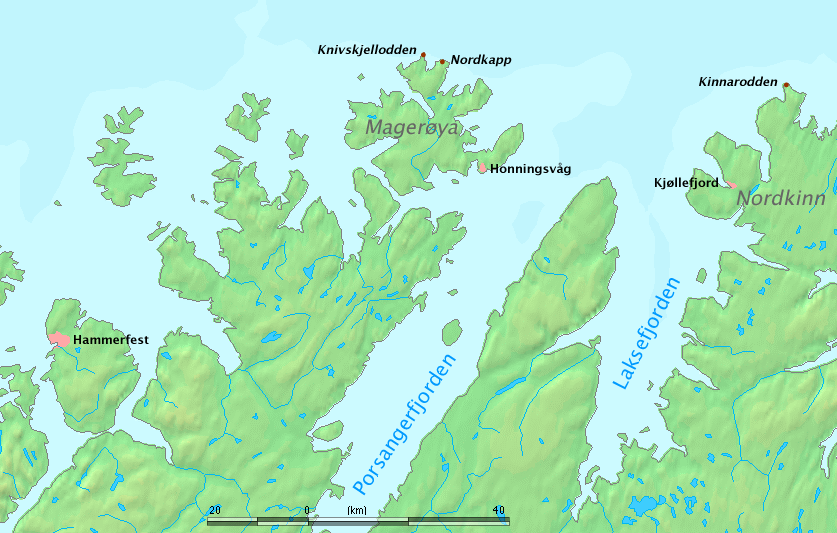
- Location of the cape
- Coordinates: 71°10′21″N 25°47′04″E
- Location: Finnmark, Norway
- Water bodies: Barents Sea
- Elevation: 307 m (1,007 ft)

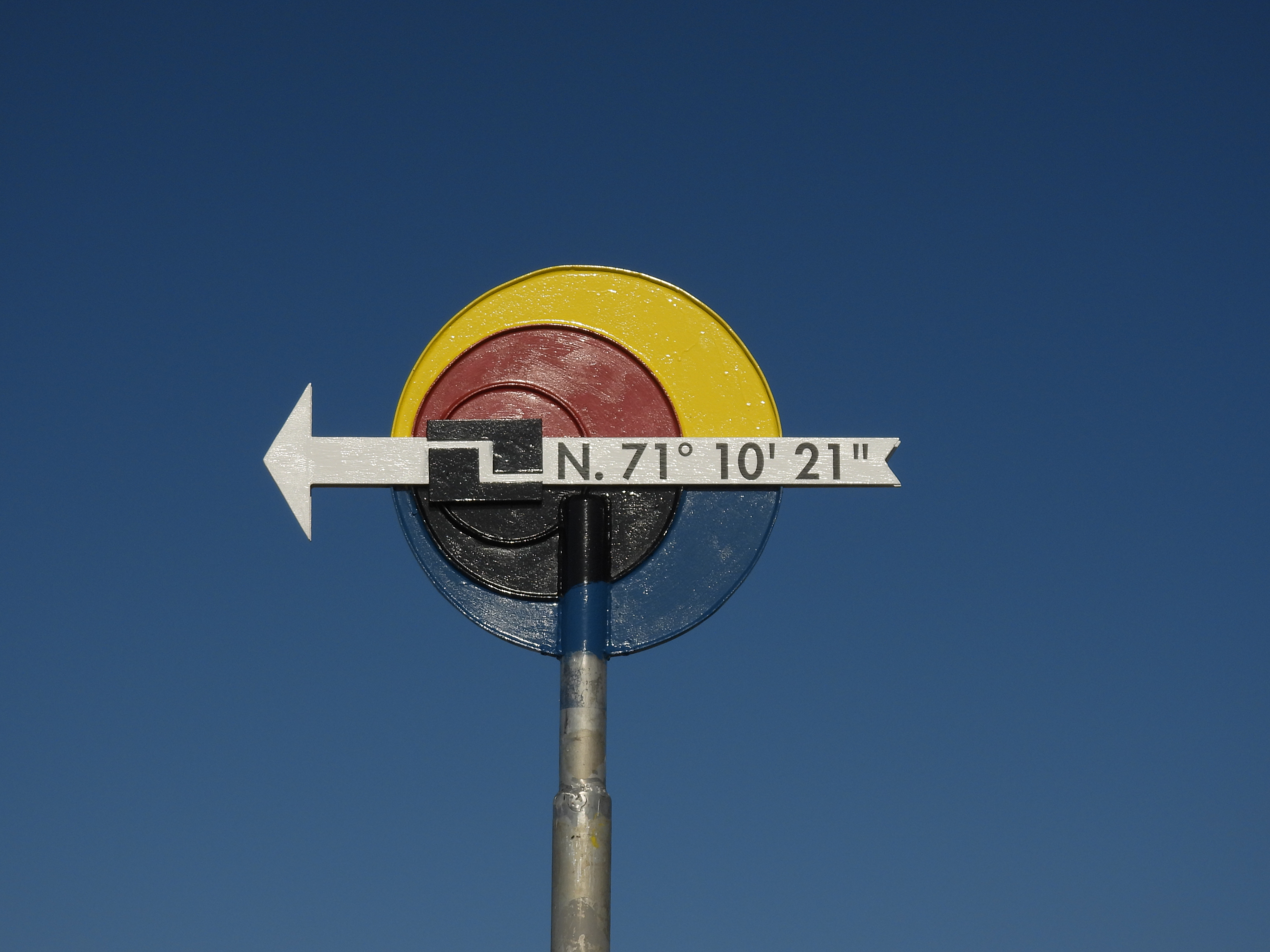
N.71º10'21" - The Coordinates of Nordkapp.

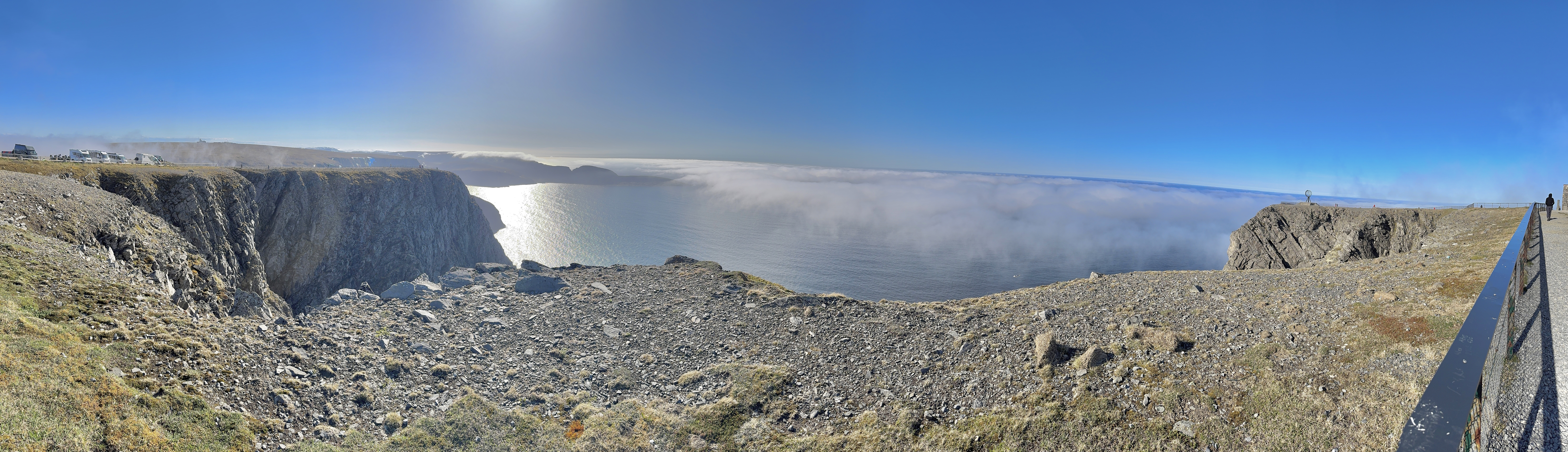
Panorama view of the cliffs at North Cape.

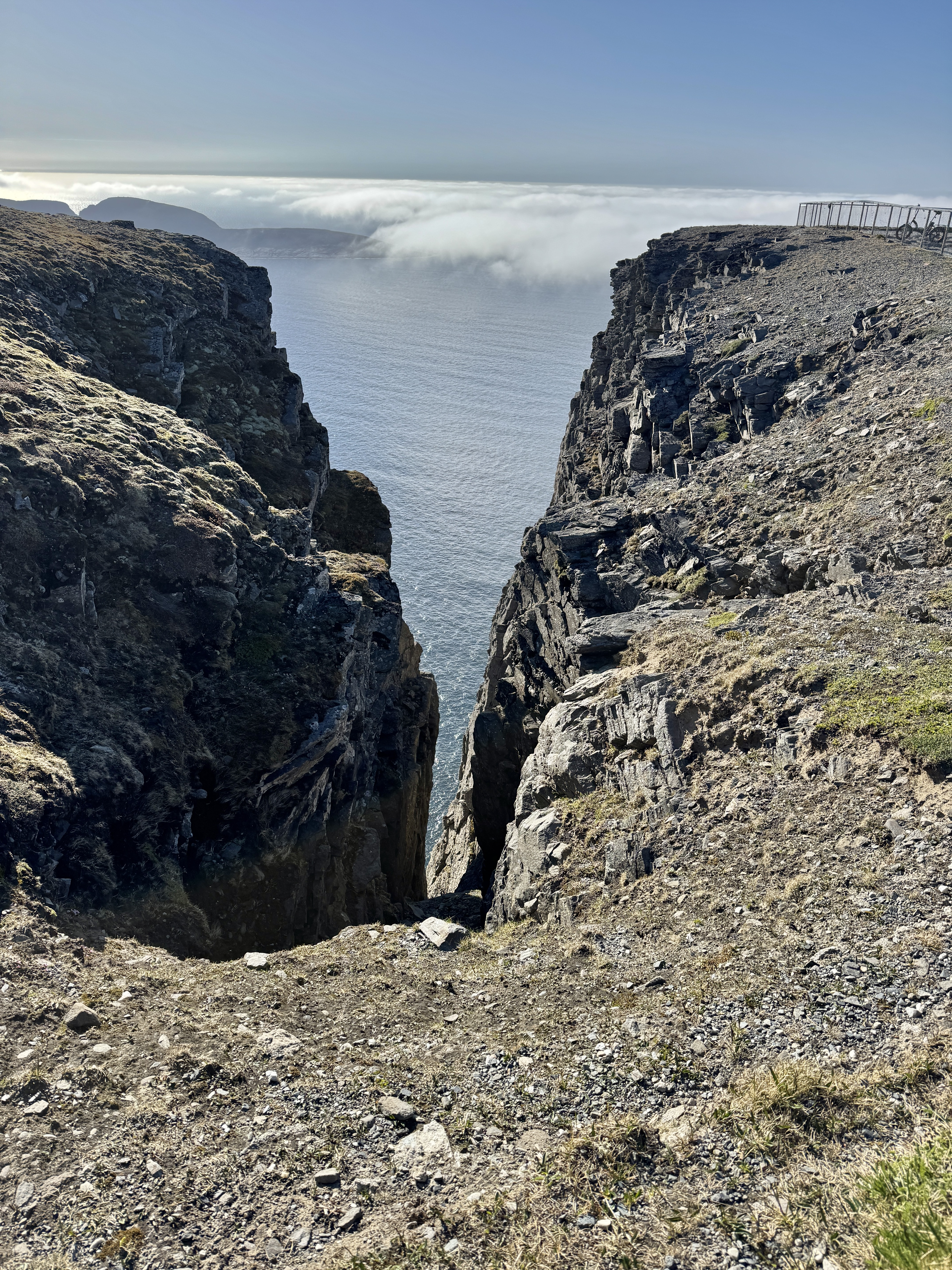
Steep cliff crevice at North Cape.

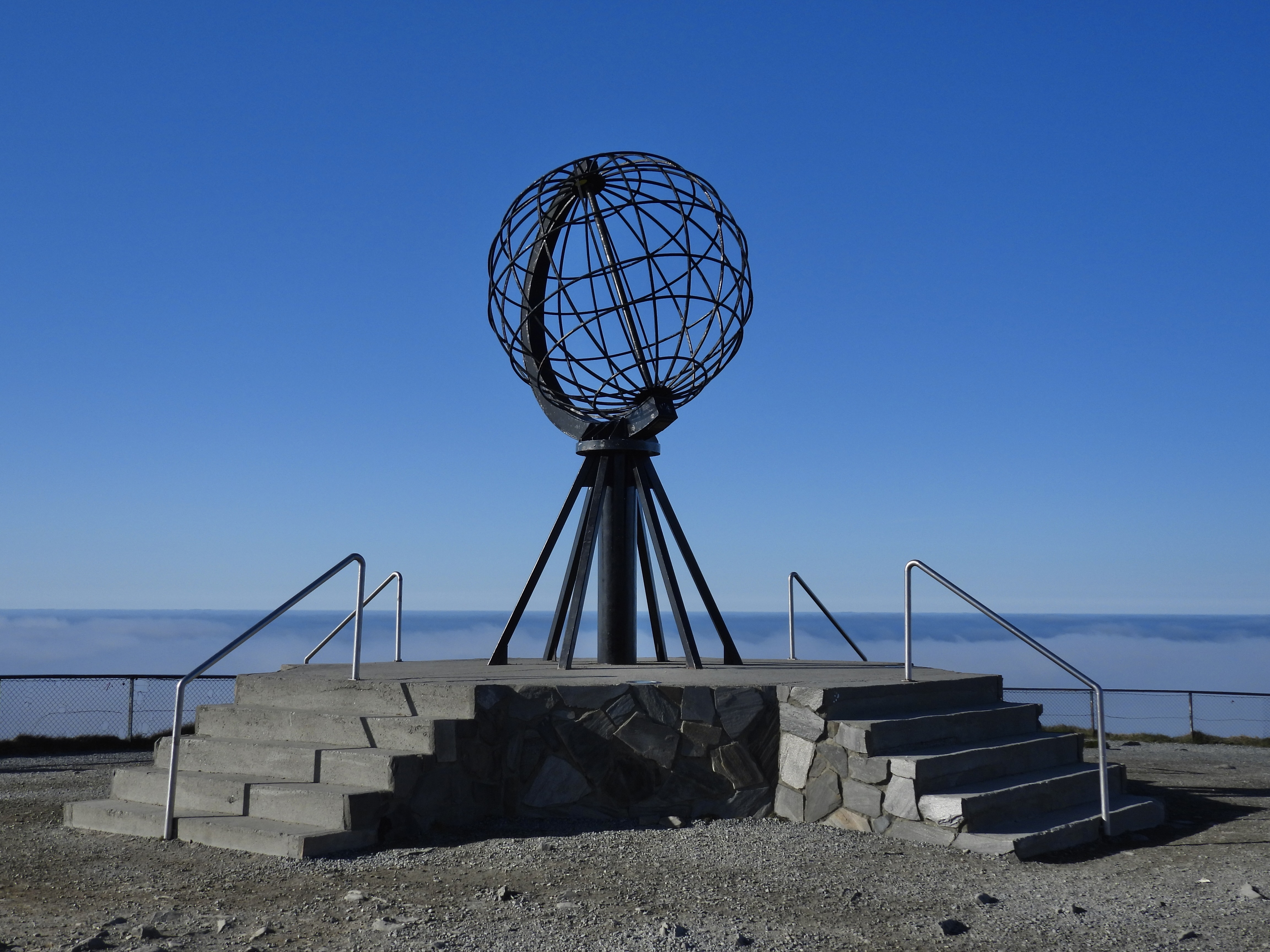
The Nordkapp Monument

The North Cape (Norwegian: Nordkapp; Northern Sami: Davvenjárga) is a cape on the northern coast of the island of Magerøya in Northern Norway. The cape is in Nordkapp Municipality in Finnmark county, Norway. The European route E69 (highway) has its northern terminus at the North Cape, which makes it the northernmost point in Europe that can be accessed by car and makes the E69 the northernmost public road in Europe. The plateau is a popular tourist attraction. The cape includes a 307-metre-high cliff (1,007 ft) with a large flat plateau on top, where visitors, weather permitting, can watch the midnight sun and views of the Barents Sea to the north. North Cape Hall, a visitor centre, was built in 1988 on the plateau. It includes a café, restaurant, post office, souvenir shop, a small museum, and video cinema.

== Geography ==
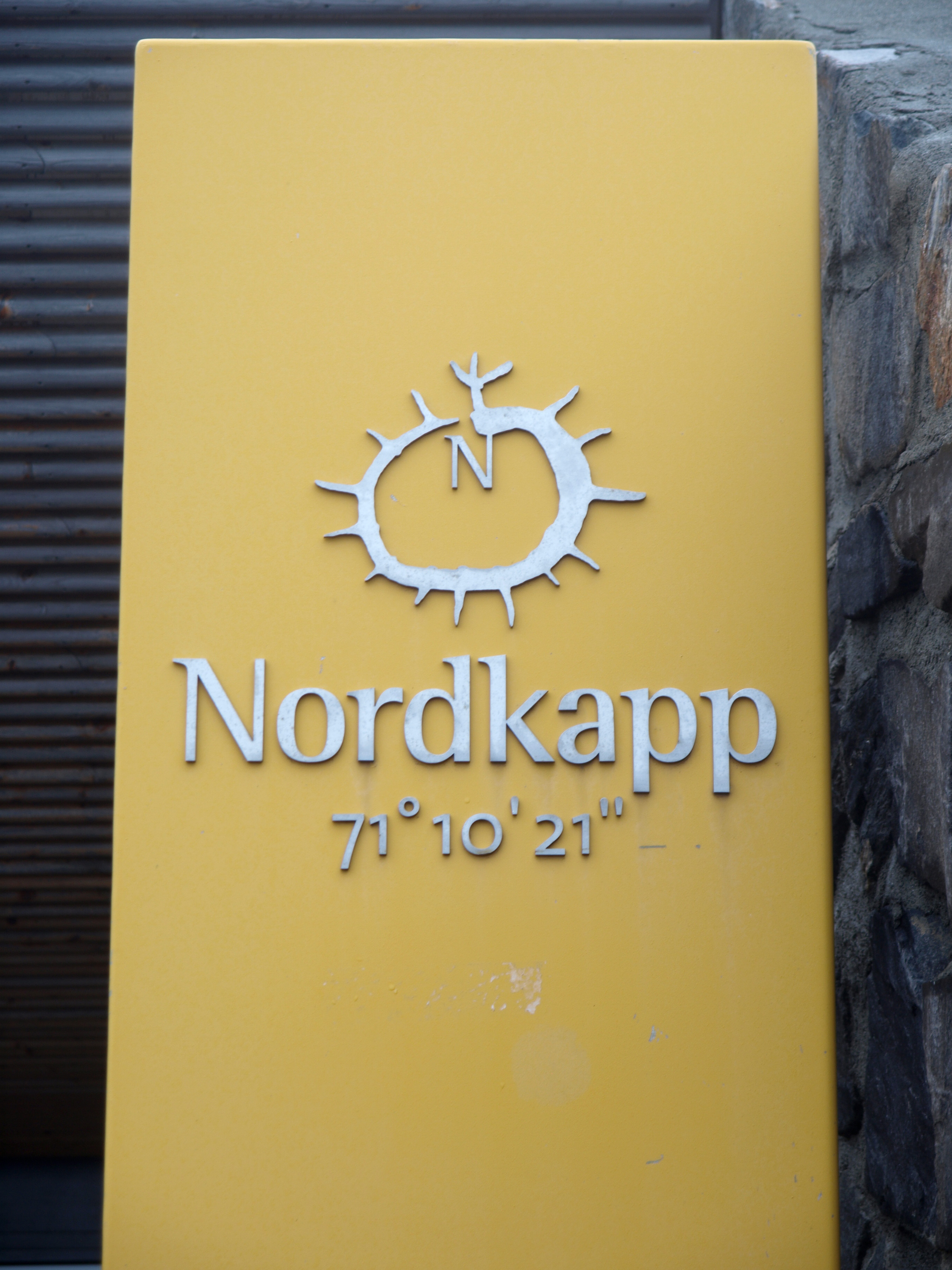
Nordkapp latitude

The steep cliff of the North Cape is located at 71°10′21″N 25°47′04″E, about 2,102.3 km (1,306.3 mi) from the North Pole. Nordkapp is often inaccurately referred to as the northernmost point of Europe. However, the neighbouring Knivskjellodden Cape actually extends 1,450 m (4,760 ft) further north. Furthermore, both of these points are situated on an island (Magerøya), albeit one connected by road to the mainland. The northernmost point of mainland Europe is located at Cape Nordkinn (Kinnarodden) which lies about 5.7 km (3.5 mi) further south and about 70 km (43 mi) to the east. That point is located near the village of Mehamn on the Nordkinn Peninsula. The northernmost point of Europe including islands, is hundreds of kilometers further north, either in Russia's Franz Josef Land or Norway's Svalbard archipelago, depending on whether Franz Josef Land is considered to be in Europe or in Asia.

The North Cape is the point where the Norwegian Sea, part of the Atlantic Ocean, meets the Barents Sea, part of the Arctic Ocean. The midnight sun can be seen from 14 May to 31 July. The sun reaches its lowest point between 12:14 am and 12:24 am (00:14 and 00:24) during those days.

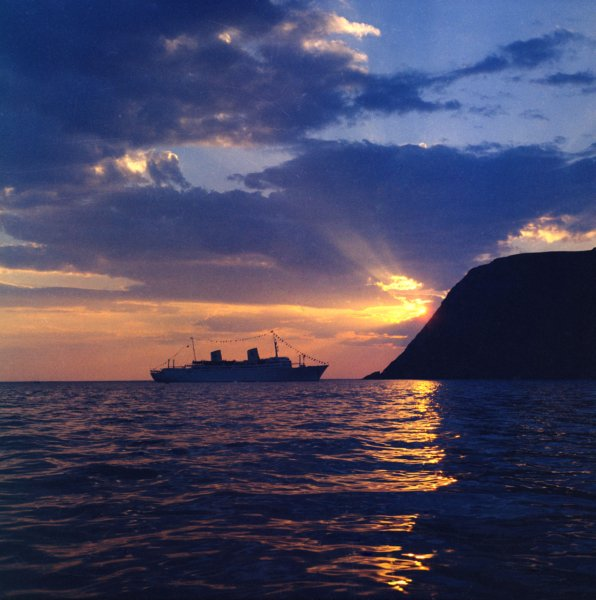
Gripsholm at Nordkapp

== Transport ==
The North Cape is reached by European route E69 highway through the North Cape Tunnel, an undersea tunnel connecting the island of Magerøya to the mainland. The EuroVelo bicycle routes EV1, EV7 and EV11 connect the North Cape to Sagres, Portugal, Malta and Athens, respectively.

Several cruise ships visit the North Cape every year. Honningsvåg is one of the main stops of the Havila Kystruten and Hurtigruten coastal ships.

Regular buses run from the nearby town of Honningsvåg to the North Cape (33 km (21 mi)), and coaches meet the many cruise ships that call at the port of Honningsvåg.

The nearest airport is Honningsvåg Valan Airport (HVG), which offers several flights to and from Tromsø Langnes International Airport (TOS).

=== Winter ===
It is possible to visit the North Cape during winter, but there is often heavy snow and wind and the last stretch of road is only open for convoys at certain times. Before this, E69 was the only winter-closed E-route in Europe.

== History ==
The North Cape was named by the Englishman Steven Borough, captain of the Edward Bonaventure, which sailed past in 1553 in search of the Northeast Passage.

=== Early tourism ===
The North Cape became a popular tourist destination during the last decades of the nineteenth century, especially after King Oscar II's visit in 1873. Regular coastal steamer routes from Germany to Northern Norway established in this period facilitated these visits, and Thomas Cook & Son began arranging tours to the destination as early as 1875. Tourists who climbed the cape would often do so using a path equipped with wired ropes from Hornviken. They would often celebrate the visit with the writing of postcards, so-called "Cape cards", gazing at the midnight sun.

=== Monuments and buildings ===
A granite column was erected commemorating the visit of King Oscar II of Norway and Sweden in 1873 and the visit of German Kaiser Wilhelm II (in 1891) was also marked with a memorial. In 1891–92, an octagonal wooden building was erected on top of the cape, later named "Stoppenbrinck's" (or "Stoppenbrink's") "Champagne Pavilion".

=== World War II ===
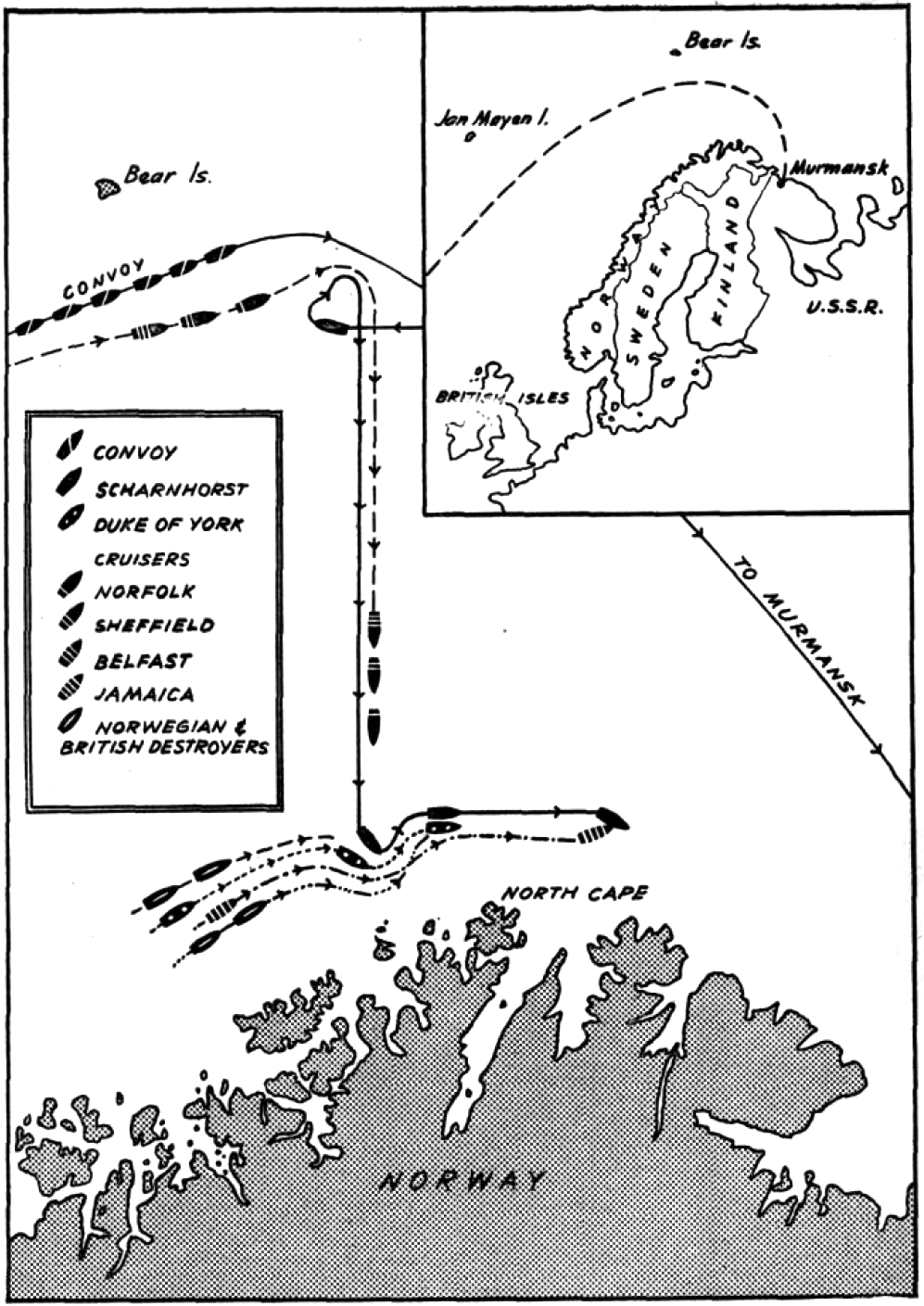
Contemporary map of the Battle of the North Cape

In 1943, the Battle of the North Cape was fought in the Arctic Ocean off this cape, where the German battleship Scharnhorst was eventually sunk by gunfire from the British battleship HMS Duke of York and torpedoes from the Norwegian destroyer HNoMS Stord, and other ships of the British Navy.

=== Road access ===
A road to the North Cape was first built in 1956.

=== Admission fee ===
In July 2026, the office of the County Governor of Troms and Finnmark handed down its decision that money shall not be charged, for entering the plateau at North Cape; furthermore, the practice of charging money from those entering the plateau, has to cease immediately.

==== Admission fee courtcase ====
As of Q3 2022, the justice system has decided that money will not be charged for parking [on the parking lot] at the North Cape; the government has won the case in the appellate court also; the defendant has appealed to the supreme court, as of Q3 2022. (The courtcase started in 2021.)

As of 2022, admission to the North Cape visitor centre cost 310 kr per adult [16 years and older] - and 90 for child between 7-years old and 15-years old. Often there is fog (since the plateau is above the common cloud base), which obscures the view. There is no discount for this situation, but the full price ticket is valid for multiple entries within 24 hours.

In 2000, and again in 2011, the Norwegian Ministry of the Environment responded to pressure from interest groups and asked Nordkapps VEL, the company that maintains the site, to reduce the admission fee to the plateau. Nordkapps VEL responded that the 8,000 daily visitors and distant location places great demands on the operations, maintenance, and security of the facilities and natural features of the large site. Visitors arriving by foot, bicycle, or other non-motorized vehicles are nowadays offered free entrance.

== Sport and leisure ==
The 2009 Trans Europe Foot Race started in Bari, Italy and finished at North Cape. The total distance was 4,485 kilometres (2,787 mi).

The NorthCape4000 is a bicycle race that finishes at the North Cape. The total distance is around 4,200 kilometres (2,600 mi).

The first stage of the 2014 Arctic Race of Norway was held on the North Cape on 14 August 2014. The bicycle race started in Hammerfest, finishing on the North Cape and was won by Norwegian, Lars Petter Nordhaug for Visma–Lease a Bike in a time of 4 hours 51 minutes 3 seconds.

Norge På Langs is a 2,533 kilometres (1,574 mi) classic ski route, which stretches from Lindesnes, the most southerly tip of Norway to Nordkapp in the far north. The record of cycling this distance is 4 days, 22 hours, and 18 minutes which was performed by a group of five men from Rye in Oslo, in July 2003.

The E1 European long distance path begins in the North Cape and extends for 7,114 km south to the Mediterranean Sea.
