= Posebyen =

Neighborhood in Kristiansand, Norway

- Neighborhood in Kristiansand
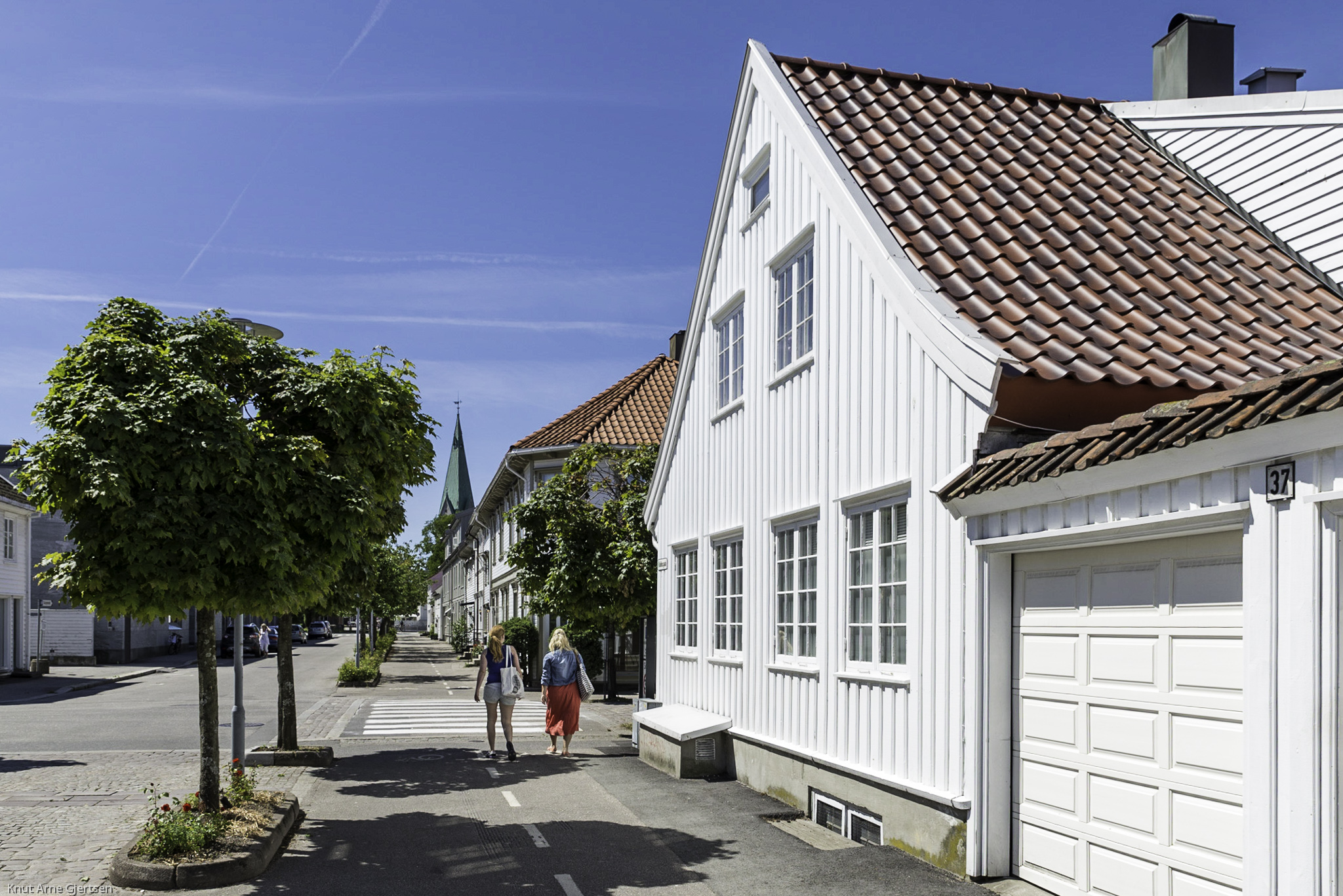
- View of Rådhusgata with Kronprinsens gate in Posebyen
- Interactive map of Posebyen
- Coordinates: 58.15066°N 7.9974°E
- Country: Norway
- County: Agder
- Municipality: Kristiansand
- Borough: Kvadraturen
- Elevation: 9 m (30 ft)
- Time zone: UTC+01:00 (CET)
  - Summer (DST): UTC+02:00 (CEST)

Posebyen is a neighbourhood in the city of Kristiansand in Agder county, Norway. Posebyen is located in the downtown borough of Kvadraturen, along the western shore of the river Otra. It consists mostly of large, white, wooden houses, many of which were left intact after the big city fire in 1892. Therefore, it forms the largest continuous collection of old wooden houses in any city in Northern Europe.

The Kvadraturen skolesenter high school and the Tordenskjoldsgate elementary school are both located in the neighbourhood.

The streets Tollbodgata, Rådhusgata, Gyldenløves gate, Skippergata, Henrik Wergelands gate, Kristian IVs gate, and Tordenskjolds gate are the streets that cross Posebyen west and east, while the streets Kirkegate, Holbergs gate, Kronprinsens gate and Elvegata cross from north to south.

Posebyen is located north of Tangen, east of Gyldengården, and includes part of what is called Nybyen.

== Photos ==
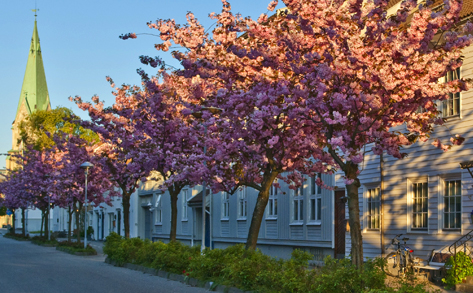
Rådhusgata with Kristiansand Cathedral in the background

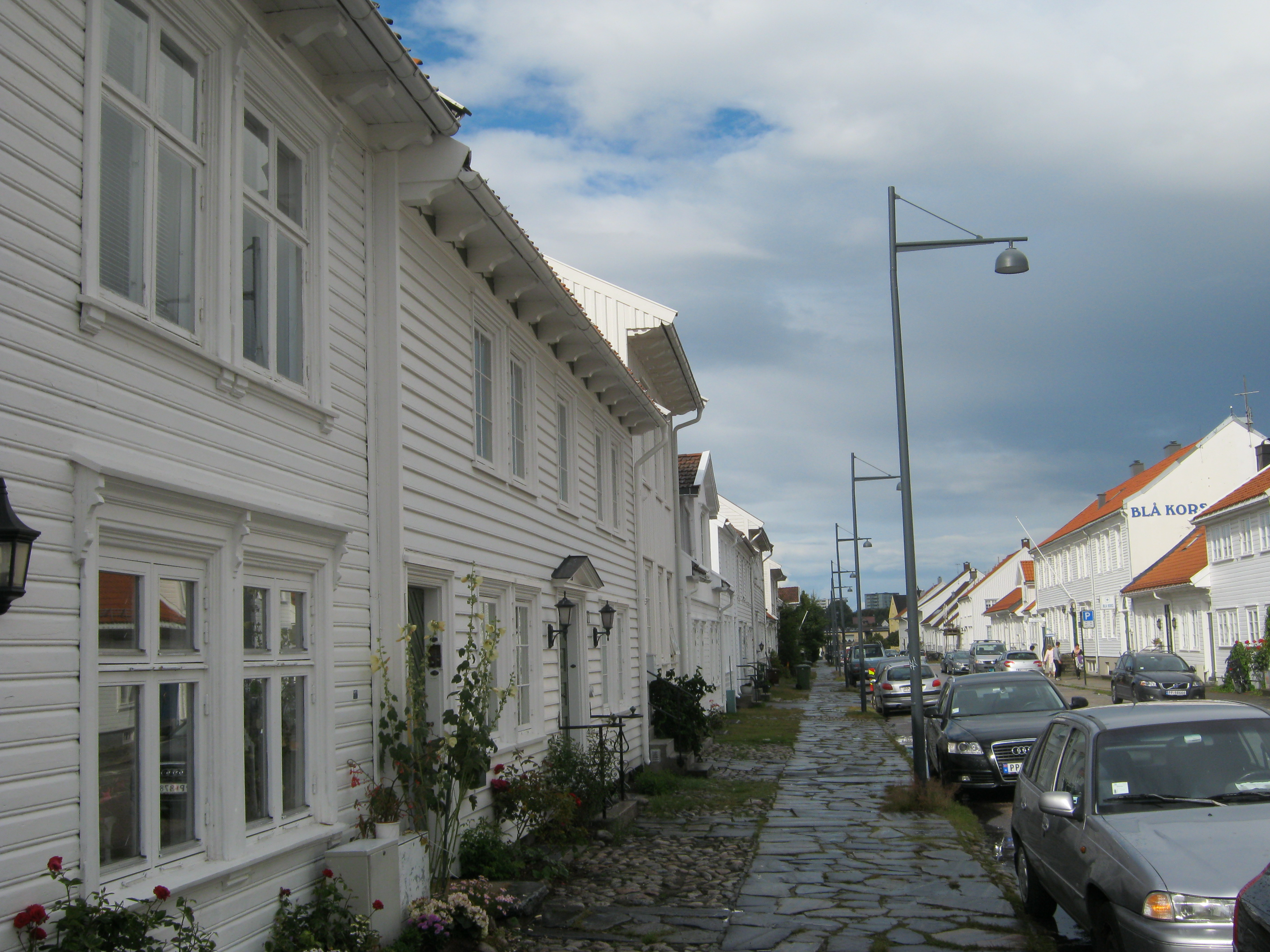
Gyldenløves gate

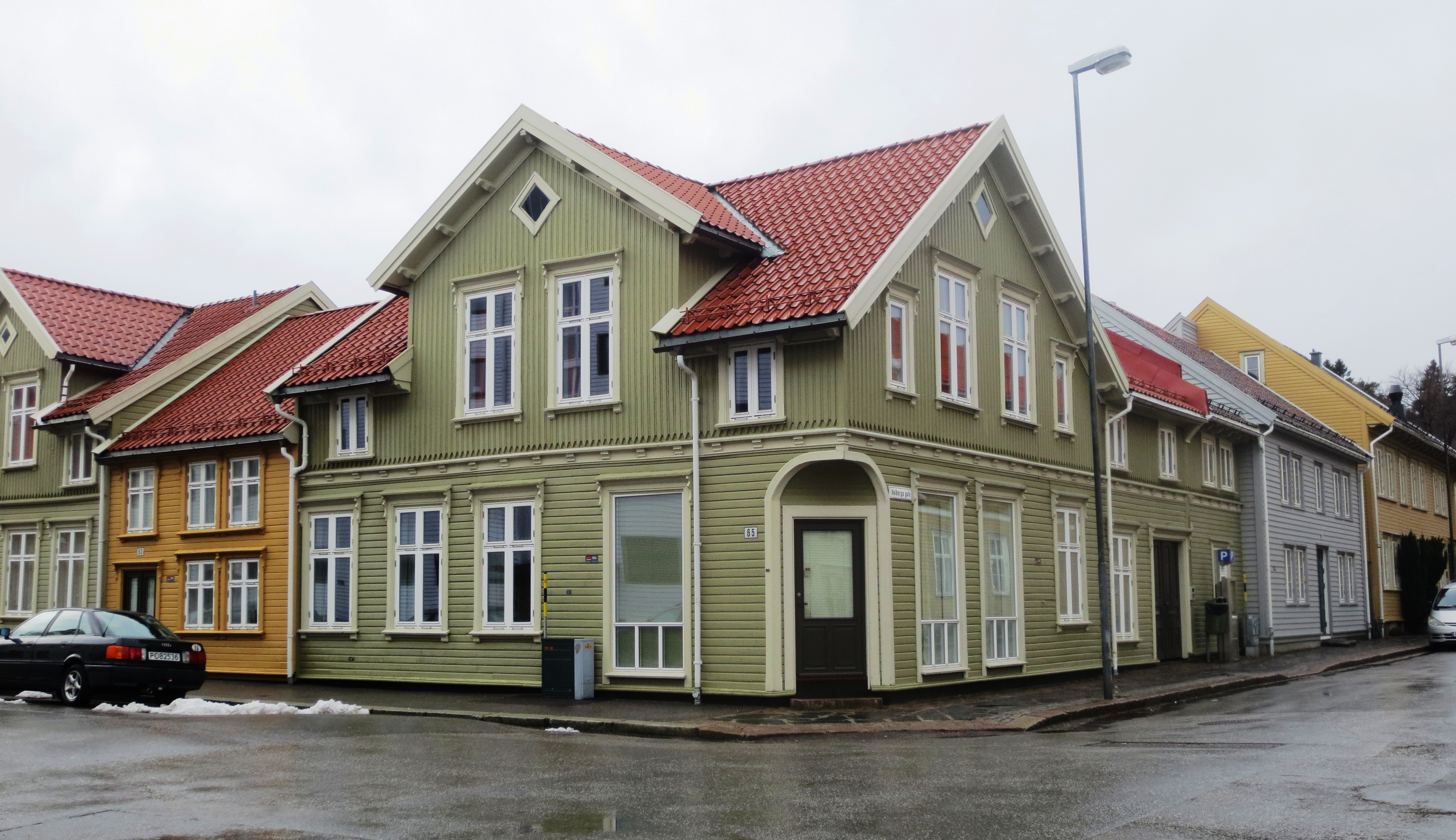
Christian IV's gate
