= Nupen (surname) =

Nupen is a surname. Notable people with the surname include:

- Buster Nupen (1902–1977), South African cricketer
- Christopher Nupen (1934–2023), South African-born, UK-based filmmaker
- Kjell Nupen (1955–2014), Norwegian contemporary artist
