= Bystranda =

Beach in Kristiansand, Norway

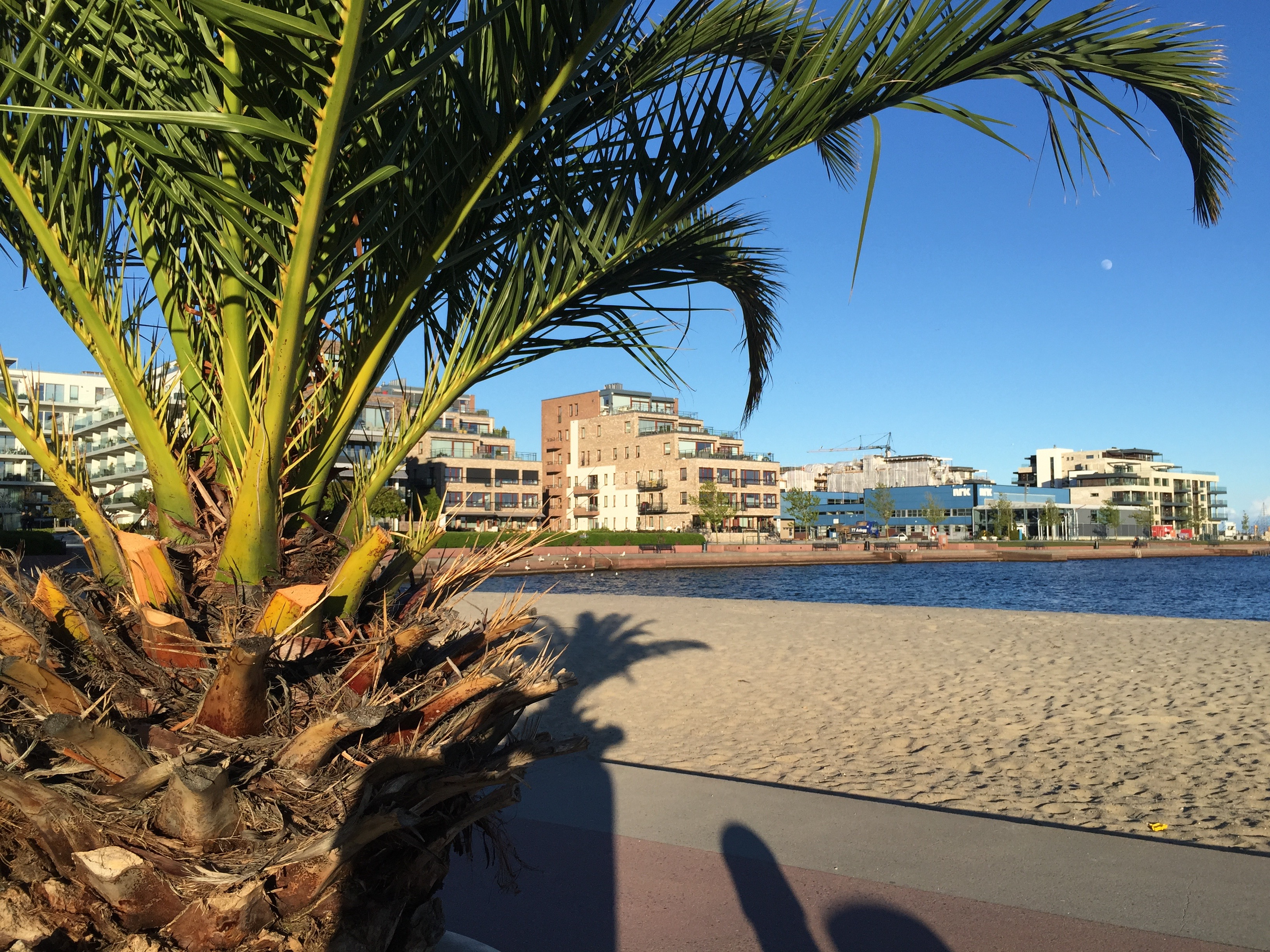
- Bystranda with apartments of Tangen in the background.
- Type: Beach and pier
- Spans: Skagerrak
- Location: Kristiansand Municipality, Agder, Norway
- Coordinates: 58°8′47″N 8°0′27.6″E

Characteristics
- Total length: 271.145 m (889.58 ft)

Bystranda (lit. 'The City Beach') is a Blue Flag beach in the southeastern part of the downtown of the city of Kristiansand in Kristiansand Municipality in Agder county, Norway. It is located just east of the mouth of the river Otra. The shallow sandy beach by the Kristiansand Boardwalk consists of fine filled sand.

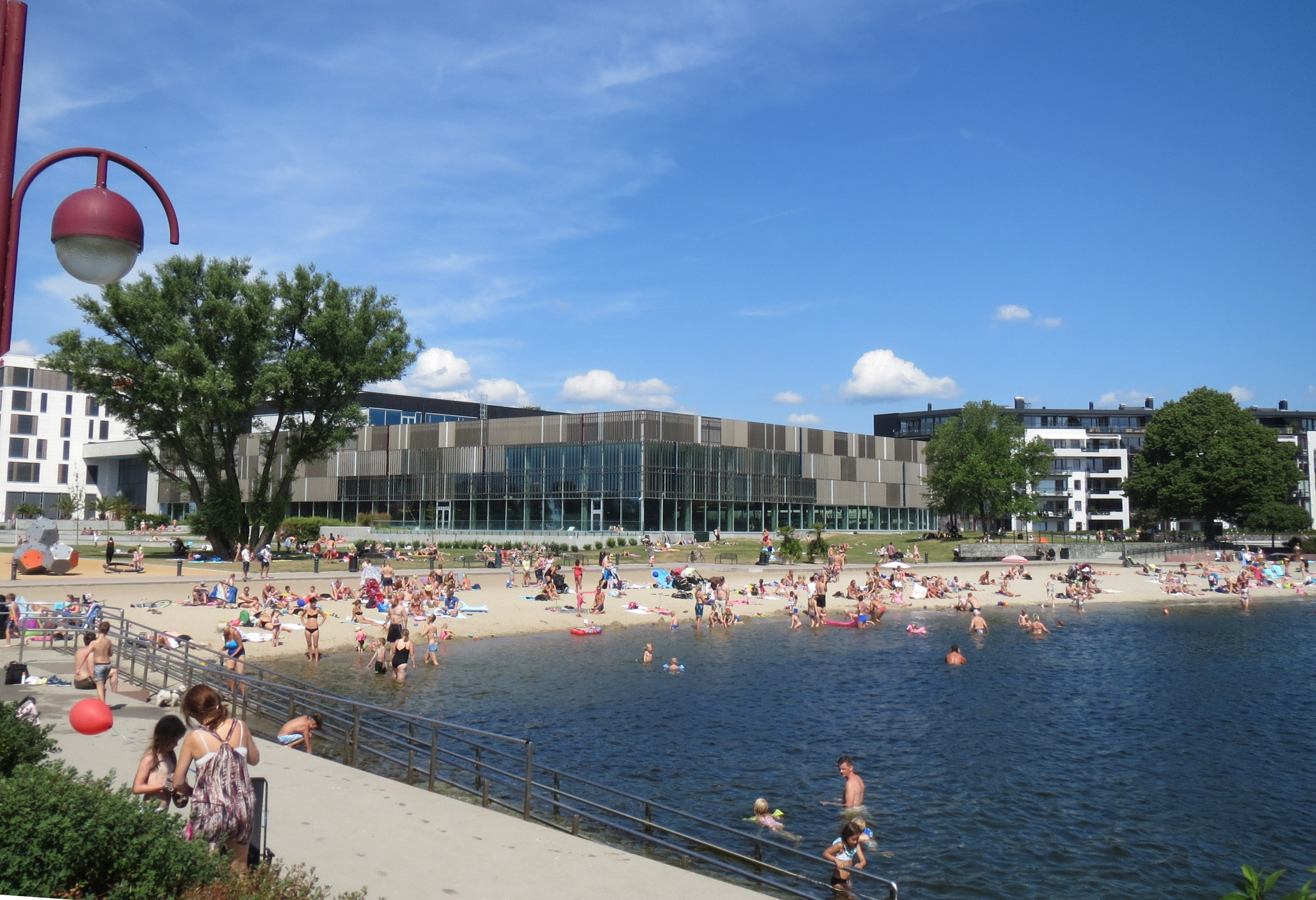
Bystranda and Aquarama

By Bystranda there are seating areas, bathrobes stairs, sand volleyball court, skate ramp, playground, and restrooms. At the plant of the bathing beach was emphasized that it should be accessible to children and the disabled. Bystranda is popular on hot summer days. Close to Bystranda is the indoor water park Aquarama.

== Aquarama ==
Aquarama is an indoor swimming complex with water slides, pools, bar and Jacuzzis. There is also an outdoor pool. Aquarama also has a fitness center and climbing walls. It opened up in 2013.

== Bystranda Hotel ==
Bystranda Hotel is a hotel under the chain Scandic. It lies walls-to-walls with Aquarama and opened up in 2013 as well. It is the largest hotel in Kristiansand and Southern Norway.

== Concert venue ==
Bystranda is also used as a concert venue. Palmesus is an annual music festival at the beach in early July.
