= Arendal Airport, Rådhuskaien =

- IATA: none; ICAO: none

Summary
- Airport type: Public
- Owner: Arendal Municipality
- Operator: Arendal Port Authority
- Serves: Arendal, Norway
- Location: Rådhuskaien, Arendal
- Elevation AMSL: 0 m (0 ft)
- Coordinates: 58.4560°N 008.7672°E

Map
- Location within Norway

Runways
| Direction | Length | | Surface |
| Direction | m | ft | Surface |
|---|---|---|---|
| | | | Water |

Arendal Airport, Rådhuskaien (Norwegian: Arendal flyvehavn, Rådhuskaien) was a water aerodrome in Arendal, Norway, which operated between 1935 and 1939. Situated at Rådhuskaien, it served the scheduled coastal seaplane service operated by Norwegian Air Lines.

== History ==
The first water aerodrome in Arendal was a provisional facility built by the Royal Norwegian Navy Air Service in 1920. Arendal Naval Air Station was constructed as a landing site off the island of Merdø, several kilometers from the town center. It was staffed for 54 days between 12 July and 11 September before being closed. The Navy Air Service resumed use of the station for some weeks during late 1939.

The need for an airport arose again in 1935, when Norwegian Air Lines commenced a coastal air service from Oslo to Bergen. The airline's Junkers Ju 52 Havørn landed in the town on 11 June on a trial route. The first period the aircraft anchored at buoy and passengers and cargo were transported there with a boat. The better the conditions a floating dock was construction at Rådhuskaien, the docks off Arendal Town Hall. The route was taken over by the Ju 52 Ternen from 1936, following the Havørn Accident.

Meanwhile, planning of a land airport for Agder was launched. The municipal council of Arendal Municipality proposed that the town be selected as host, and proposed Vessøyslettene as a suitable location in May 1935. Kristiansand Airport, Kjevik was selected as Agder's main airport, opening in 1939. This caused the coastal service past Agder to be terminated. Arendal would ultimately receive a general aviation airport with the 1996 opening of Arendal Airport, Gullknapp.

== Facilities ==
The airport was situated on the public docks in the town center of Arendal at Rådhuskaien off Arendal Town Hall. It consisted of floating docks and a small operations building. The aircraft used Byfjorden as their runway.
