= Kristiansand Boardwalk =

Street in Kristiansand, Norway

Coordinates: 58°08′35″N 7°59′57″E

Kristiansand Boardwalk (Norwegian: Strandpromenaden) is a street in the town centre Kvadraturen in Kristiansand, Norway. The street is in most of its course closed to the passage of motor vehicles, but operates in the tourist season in connection with sightseeing. From where the street Strandpromenaden ends in the eastern corner of the town centre, there is a continuing boardwalk upwards the river Otra. The boardwalk got the Nordic Green Space Award in 2013.

== Parks ==
The waterfront runs past the following parks in a row:

- Gravaneparken by Hartmann's pier, vis-à-vis the Fiskebrygga
- Otterdalsparken with fountain by artist Kjell Nupen, the second largest fountain in the Norway after the Vigeland Sculpture Park.
- Retranchementet or "Tresse", the local name. This is a park and open space in front of Christiansholm Fortress. Tresse is used as the party place, sometimes for events, concerts and beach volleyball tournament. Playground and outdoor ice-and-ball court. Toilets. Statue of Camilla Collett and Aviation pioneer Bernt Balchen.
- The park at the marina Christiansholm Marina (also called Langfeld commons)
- Bystranda is a public beach, and there are indoors swimming facilities at Aquarama nearby.

== Gallery ==
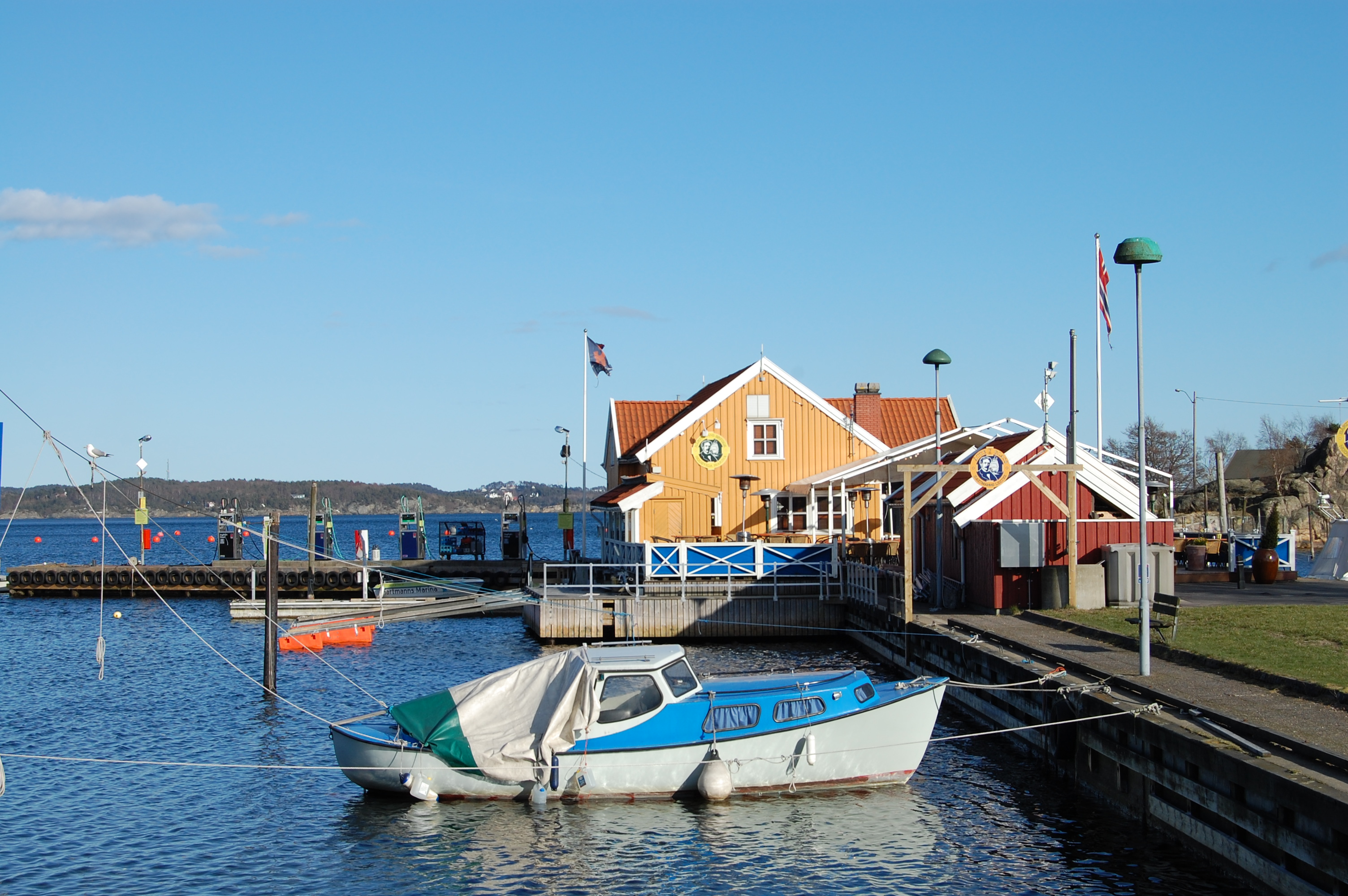
Hartmanns pier by Gravaneparken

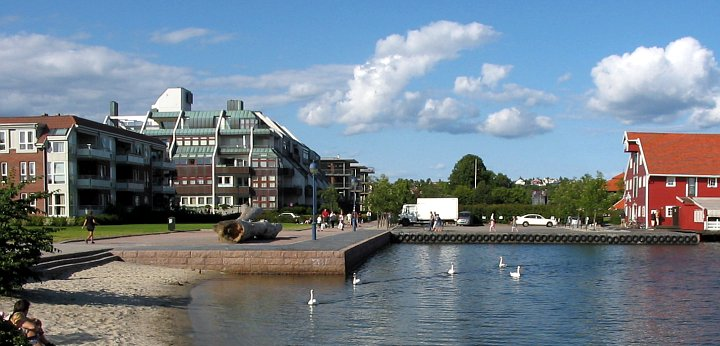
The boardwalk in Gravaneparken

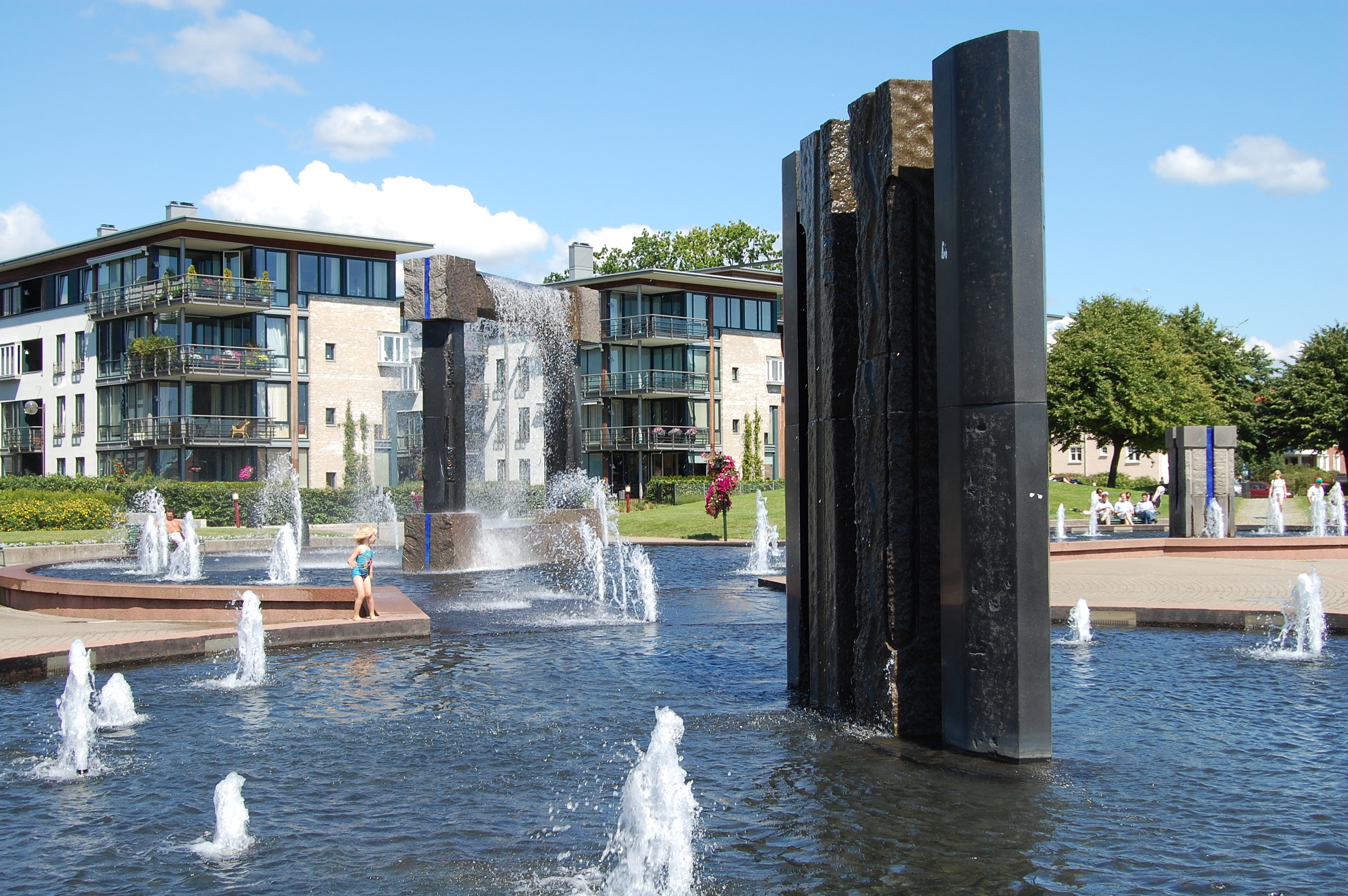
In Otterdal Park at the waterfront is the second largest fountain construction in Norway by Kjell Nupen.

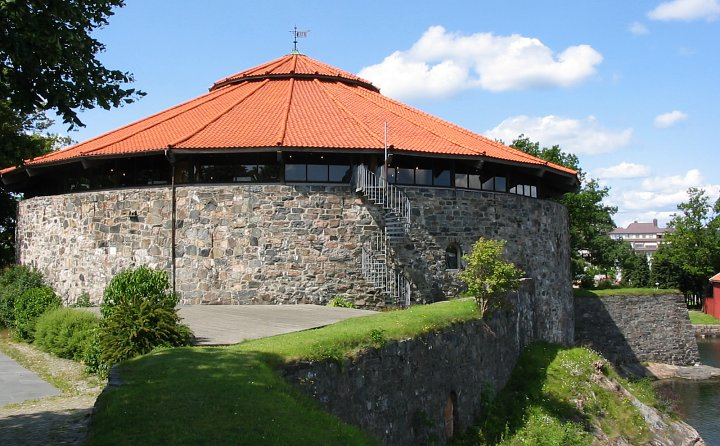
The waterfront park passes Tresse (Retranchementet) and Christiansholm Fortress.

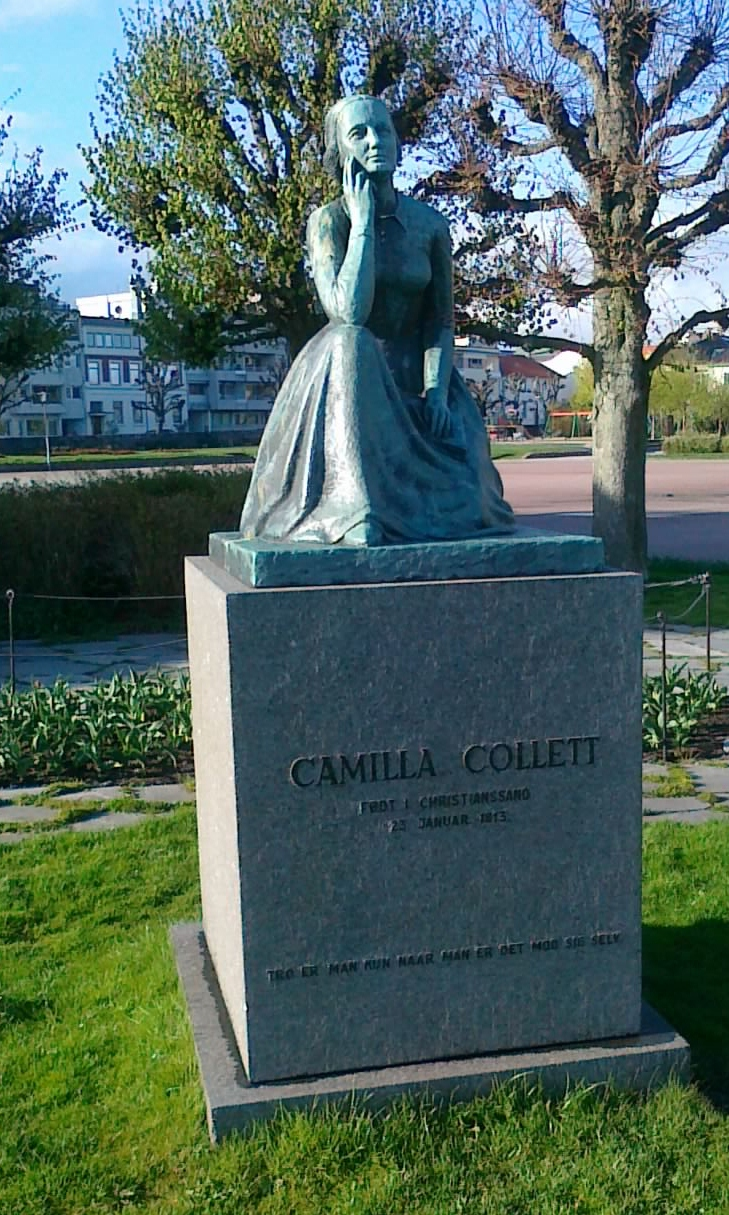
Statue of Camilla Collett

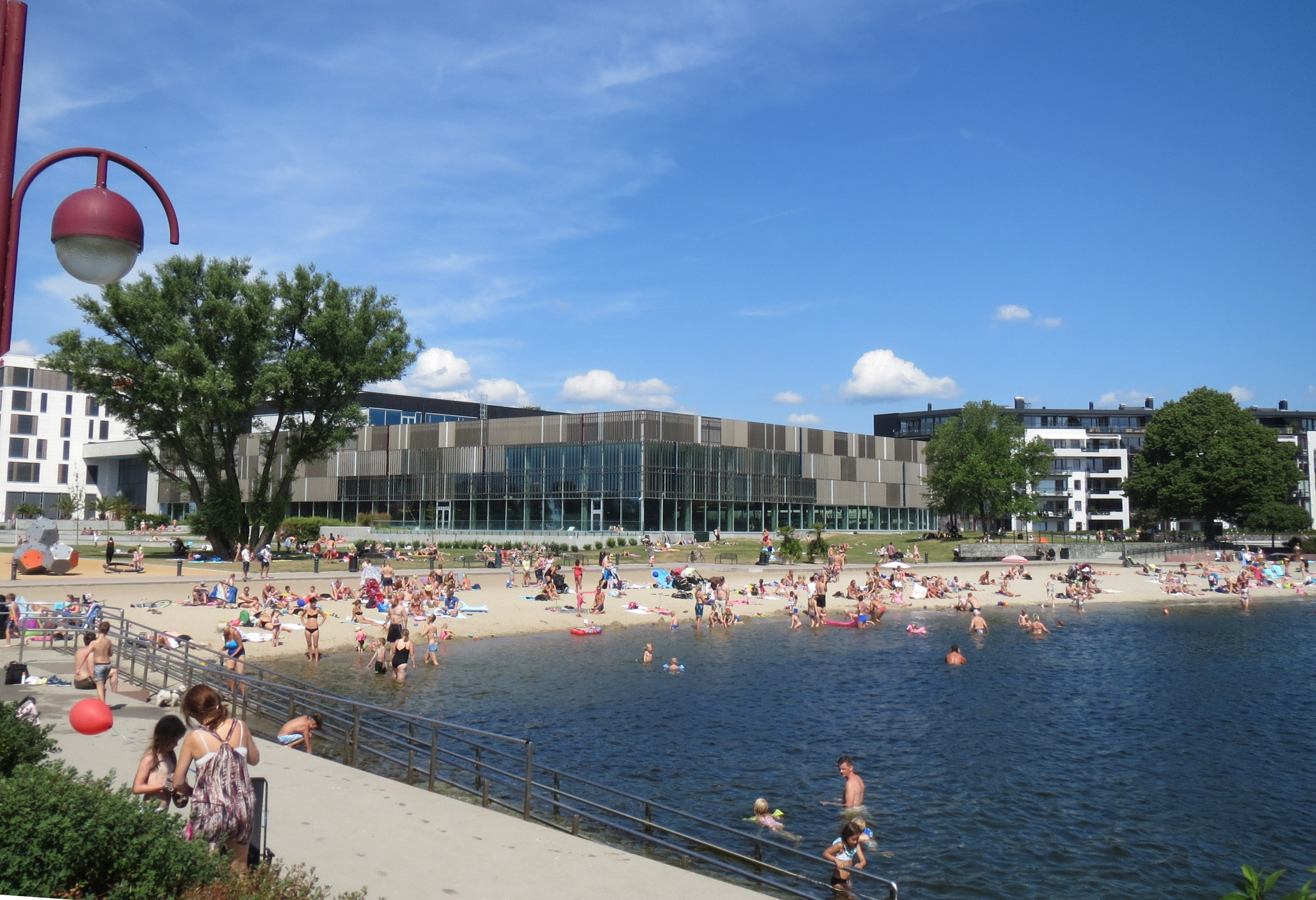
Bystranda, the beach not far south of the boardwalk
