= Volue =

Norwegian company

Volue ASA
- Volue logo
- Company type: Allmennaksjeselskap
- Traded as: OSE: VOLUE
- ISIN: NO0010894603
- Industry: Computer Software
- Founded: 2020
- Headquarters: Oslo, Norway
- Area served: Worldwide
- Key people: Trond Straume (CEO); Arnstein Kjesbu (CFO); Ingeborg Gjærum (CSO); Jörg Lienhardt (CTO); Melanie Abt (CCO)
- Products: Technology services for the energy, power grid and infrastructure markets
- Revenue: ▲NOK 891.87 million (2020)
- Net income: ▼NOK 82.23 million (2020)
- Total assets: ▲NOK 1,472.69 million (2020)
- Owner: Arendals Fossekompani (63.93%); State Street Bank and Trust Company (6.10%)
- Number of employees: 650 (2021)
- Website: www.volue.com

Volue is a Norwegian technology company working in the field of energy, power grid, water, and infrastructure, founded in March 2020.

Volue is headquartered in Oslo, Norway, with additional offices in Europe. On October 19, 2020, the company went public and was listed on the Oslo Stock Exchange on 21 April 2021.

Volue is developing products which help in renewable energy transition. In May 2021, the company received a grant from state-owned Innovation Norway company to reduce water waste using machine learning and real-time data. For developing a trading platform for energy, Volue was identified as a key innovator by the European Commission under the Horizon 2020 funding programme.

== History ==
Volue was founded in March 2020, through the merger of four Nordic companies: Markedskraft, Powel, Scanmatic and Wattsight. Volue's main goal is to increase efficiency and promote digitalisation across industries while reducing greenhouse gas emissions and environmental impact.

In October 2020, Volue announced it was preparing for an initial public offering on the Oslo Stock Exchange. Volue's IPO opened on 19 October 2020, trading under the symbol VOLUE.

In December 2020, Volue acquired trading solutions company Likron.

On 21 April 2021, Oslo Børs approves Volue ASA for admission to trading on Oslo Stock Exchange. Starting from 4 May 2021, Volue is listed on Oslo Børs. The company published its first annual report on 14 April 2021.
