= Tangen (Kristiansand) =

Neighborhood and pier in Norway

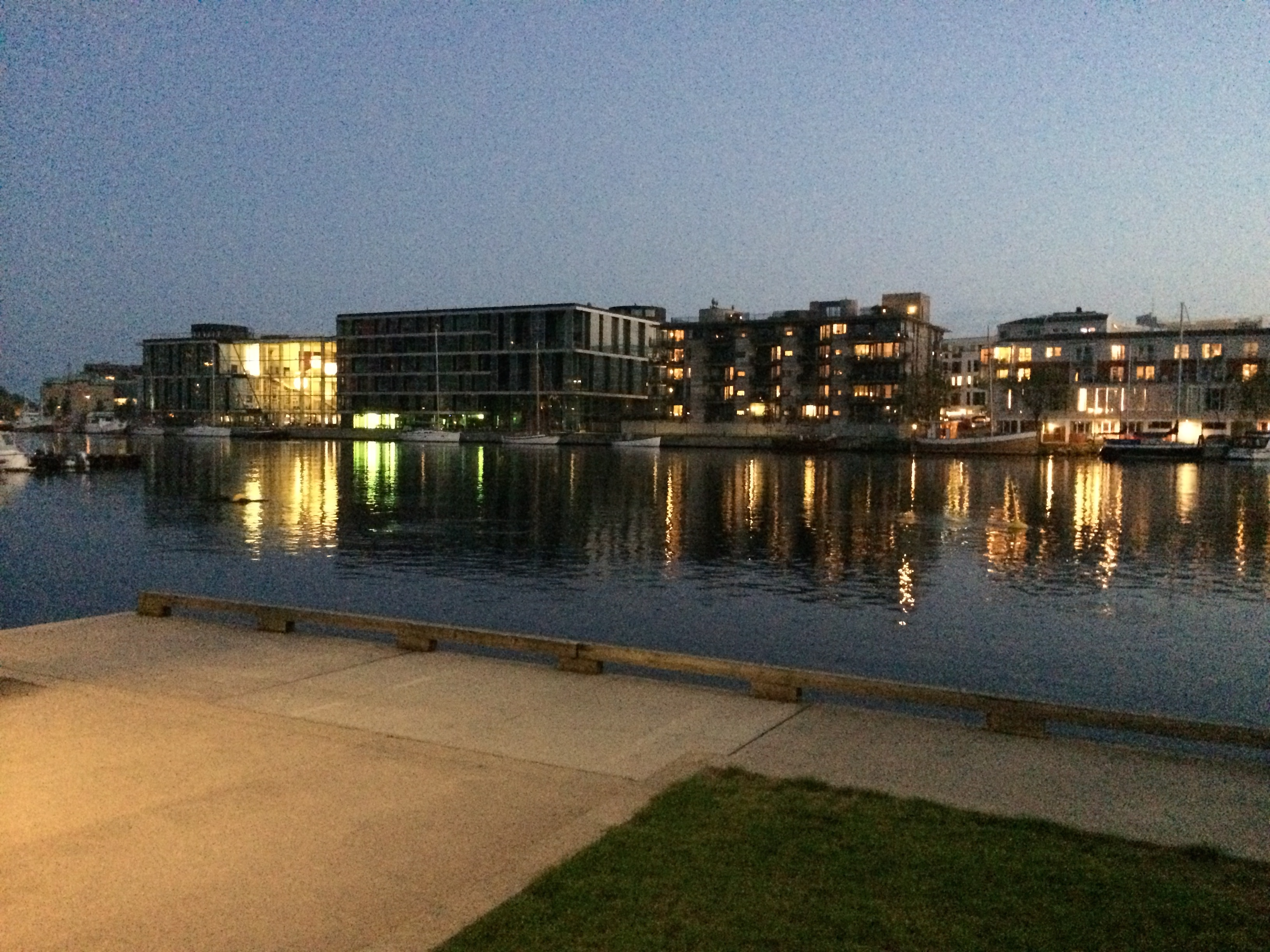
- Tangen Pier seen from Høivold Pier.
- Type: Pier and park
- Spans: Otra, Skagerrak
- Location: Kristiansand, Agder, Norway
- Coordinates: 58°08′50″N 8°00′31″E

Characteristics
- Total length: 1.504 km (0.935 mi)

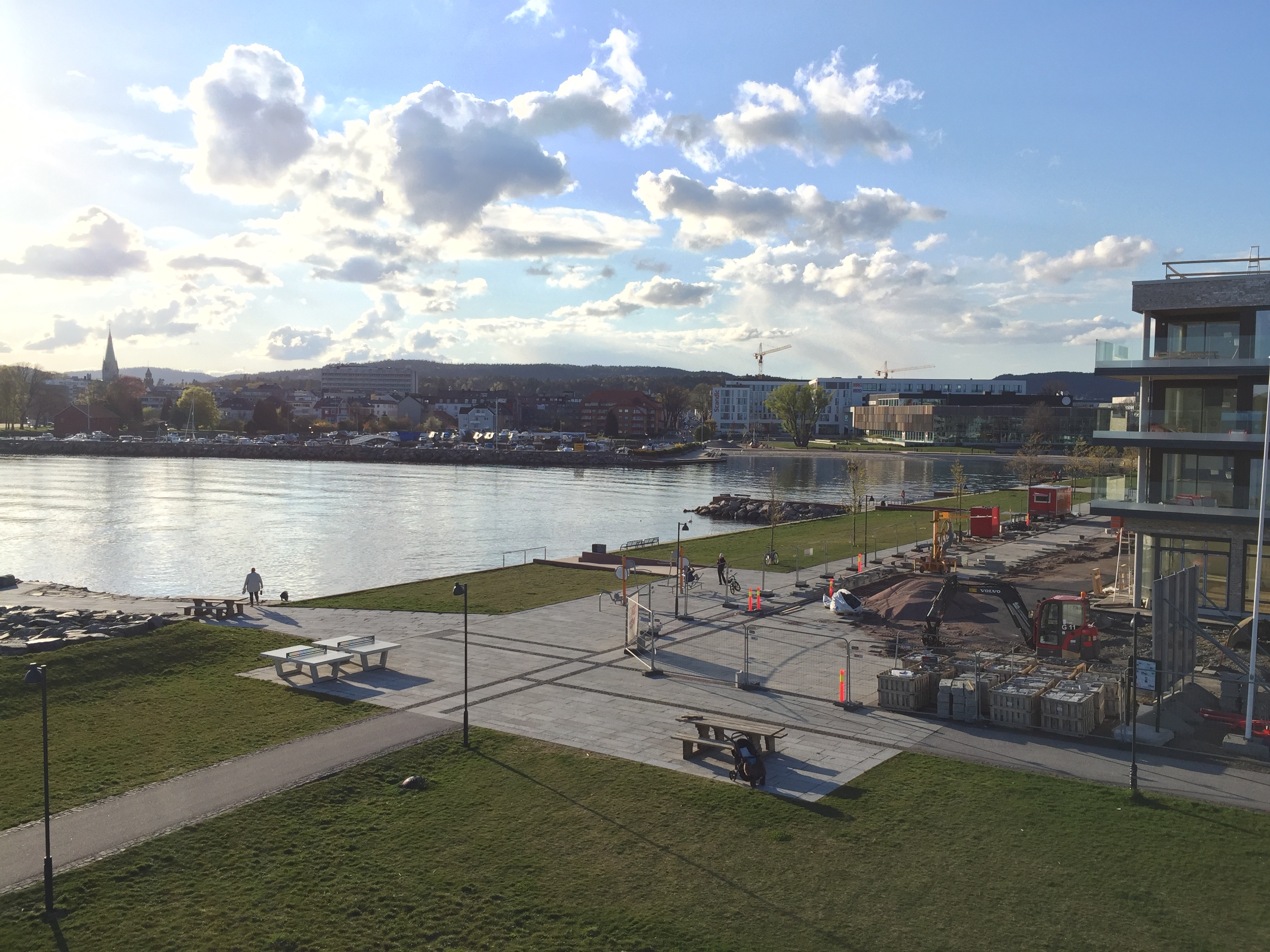
Tangen and Bystranda

Tangen is a pier and neighborhood in the city of Kristiansand in Agder county, Norway. It is a part of the Kvadraturen (Kristiansand)|Kvadraturen borough and is mostly populated with new apartments, there is one high school with the pier and Tangen is next to the beach Bystranda. The main quarter for NRK Southern Norway is located at Tangen.

== Tangen Park ==
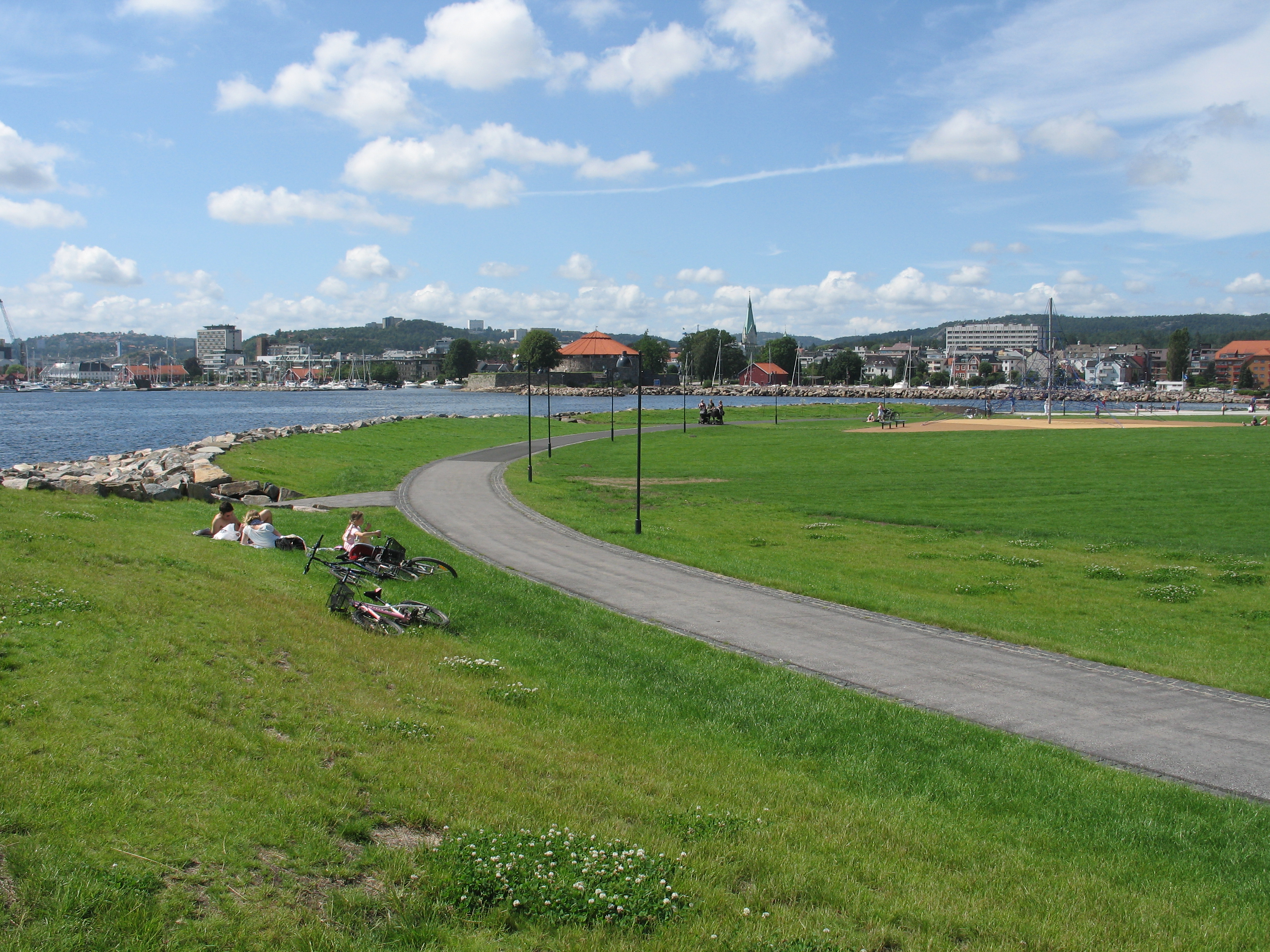
Tangen Park

Tangen Park is a grass park in the tip of Tangen, there is a pedestrian road around the area and a playground in the middle, the area is also located with public bathrooms and bench down to the shore for fishing etc.
