= Kristiansand Airport, Kongsgårdbukta =

Former water airport in Norway

- IATA: none; ICAO: none

Summary
- Airport type: Public
- Owner: Kristiansand Municipality
- Location: Kongsgård, Kristiansand, Norway
- Elevation AMSL: 0 m / 0 ft
- Coordinates: 58.1562°N 008.0356°E

Map

Runways
Direction	Length		Surface
Direction	m	ft	Surface
			Water

Kristiansand Airport, Kongsgårdbukta (Norwegian: Kristiansand sjøflyhavn, Kongsgårdbukta) was a water airport serving Kristiansand, Norway, from 1934 to 1939. Situated at Kongsgårdbukta, it consisted of a floating dock and a small terminal building. Widerøe served the airport the first year, thereafter flights were carried out by Norwegian Air Lines. The airport was closed for the opening of Kristiansand Airport, Kjevik.

== History ==
The first aerodrome in the city was Kristiansand Naval Air Station. Situated in the city center, it opened in 1919. The Royal Norwegian Navy Air Service ran a trial air route from Oslo to Kristiansand in 1920, but this was terminated after the first season. There were also civilian flights from there in 1924, 1927 and 1928.

Kongsgårdbukta was first proposed as a site for the Naval Air Service. The municipality wanted the air station out of the city center and proposed Kongsfjordbukta. The Royal Norwegian Navy also intended to move due to the hangars being built too low. However, they never received permission and funding from the government and nothing came of the plans.

Permanent civilian air services to Kristiansand were established by Widerøe in 1934. This consisted of a coastal route from Oslo to Bergen. Unlike the previous aerodrome at Tangen, Kongsgårdbukta was selected at the landing site for these services. Widerøe carried out flights for two and a half months that summer, transporting 500 passengers and 10 tonnes of post. The following year the route was taken over by Norwegian Air Lines.

The land area, Kongsgårdsletta, was considered as a possible site for a land airport for Kristiansand, but instead Tveit was chosen. Kristiansand Airport, Kjevik opened on 1 June 1939, allowing air traffic to move there.

== Facilities ==
The airport was situated on the shore side of Kongsgårdbukta, a bay of Topdalsfjorden in the north-eastern part of the city center. The airport consisted of a floating dock and a small terminal building.

== Bibliography ==
- Bakken, Rolf; Jæger, Ingrid W.; Krageboen, Sven (1989). Kr.sand lufthavn, Kjevik 50 år 1939–1989 (in Norwegian). Kristiansand. ISBN 82-991887-0-9.
- Hafsten, Bjørn; Arheim, Tom (2003). Marinens flygevåpen 1912–1944 (in Norwegian). TankeStreken. ISBN 82-993535-1-3.
- Olsen-Hagen, Bernt; Gulstad, Anne Blix (2013). Kristiansand lufthavn, Kjevik – Dokumentasjon for arkivmessig bevaring (PDF) (in Norwegian). Norwegian Aviation Museum. Archived from the original (PDF) on 2016-03-04.
