= Arendals Fossekompani =

Norwegian energy company

- Type: Allmennaksjeselskap
- Traded as: OSE: AFK
- Industry: Public utility
- Founded: 1896
- Headquarters: Arendal, Norway
- Number of employees: 32 (2019)
- Website: www.arendalsfossekompani.no

Arendals Fossekompani ASA (OSE: AFK) is a Norwegian company located in Arendal. Its principal business is production and sale of electric energy from its 2 hydroelectric powerplants. It is listed on the Oslo Stock Exchange.

Arendals is a non-controlling owner of Volue with about a 37% stake in it.
