= Federation of Norwegian Aviation Industries =

The Federation of Norwegian Aviation Industries (Norwegian: NHO Luftfart) is an employers' organisation in Norway, organized under the national Confederation of Norwegian Enterprise.

It was founded in 1988 as Flyselskapenes Landsforening, which corresponds to the current English name. The name change came in 2006. The federation currently has 60 member companies, among them Scandinavian Airlines and Norwegian Air Shuttle.

The current director general is Torbjørn Lothe. Chairman of the board is Stein Nilsen. Their headquarters are at Majorstuen, Oslo.
