= Kristiansand Naval Air Station =

- IATA: none; ICAO: none

Summary
- Airport type: Military
- Operator: Royal Norwegian Navy Air Service
- Location: Tangen, Kristiansand, Norway
- Elevation AMSL: 0 m (0 ft)
- Coordinates: 58.1455°N 008.0077°E

Map
- Location within Norway

Runways
Direction	Length		Surface
Direction	m	ft	Surface
			Water

Kristiansand Naval Air Station (Norwegian: Marinens flystasjon Kristiansand) was a water military air base operated by the Royal Norwegian Navy Air Service between 1919 and 1940. Situated at Tangen in the city center of Kristiansand in Kristiansand Municipality, Norway, it consisted of three hangars. The station was to house both reconnaissance and fighter aircraft.

== History ==
A 1916 plan of the Naval Air Service called for the establishment of five naval air stations, one of which would be located near Kristiansand. It was given the highest priority and became the second such facility in Norway, after Karljohansvern Naval Air Station. The Royal Norwegian Navy investigated the city's surroundings and identified two suitable locations, Karantenebukta on Odderøya and the city center. The latter was located on the site of a Norwegian Army base. The site was selected on 6 August 1917. This allowed the Norwegian Army Air Service to establish a rudimentary runway.

Construction commenced in early 1918 and consisted of three hangars, two for the Navy and one for the Army. By June work was sufficient for the air station to be taken into use. It was commissioned on 20 June and the first exercise started on 1 July. The last hangar was completed on 22 April 1919. There was a proposal in 1921 to build a third naval hangar, but lack of funding torpedoed the proposal.

The air station was initially led by a first lieutenant who was also a pilot, and staffed with four conscripted pilots, four conscripted mechanics, a joint chief mechanic and accountant, and a support staff of ten. The station was to carry out operations including participation in exercises through machine gun shooting, dropping of dummy bombs and dummy mines, aerial photography, reconnaissance along the coast from Farsund to Arendal, and radiotelegraphy. For this the air station was equipped with three Sopwith Baby fighters and two Marinens Flyvebaatfabrikk M.F.2 reconnaissance aircraft.

The air station was a summer-only base. It was initially staffed from mid-May through late September. For the 1920 season it was set up for coastal flights from Karljohansvern. Later years it was set up for refresher training. It acted in this capacity until 1926. The station was not used for two seasons, before being revamped in 1929 and 1930. The second hangar was rebuilt in 1933 to increase its height. This allowed it to hold a Marinens Flyvebaatfabrikk M.F.11 aircraft. It was staffed for refresher training in 1935. From 28 August 1939 the station was reactivated for use by the First Air Flight for neutrality duty.

Civilian airlines used the airport three times for trial flights. Norsk Luftseiladsforening carried out a trial scheduled service between Horten and Kristiansand to the Netherlands in 1924. Three years later they also carried out flights to England. Norske Luftruter carried out sporadic flights from 1928.

Starting in late 1932 Kristiansand Municipality asked that the airport be moved out of the city center. They proposed Kongsgårdsbukta in Topdalsfjorden, a site which would from 1934 host the civilian Kristiansand Airport, Kongsgårdbukta. The Naval Air Service agreed, but of different reasons. At high tide and onshore wind the water level could be half a meter above the floor level in the first hangar. The military proposed moving the station to Bragdøya. Meanwhile, Kristiansand Airport, Kjevik was being planned and opened in 1939. By then the Naval Air Service proposed that a new station would be built at Andøya and planning of this started. However, the Ministry of Defense instead wanted the air station situated at Kjevik. Nothing came of either plan until the German occupation in 1940. Luftwaffe opted to build a water aerodrome at Kjevik and closed the naval air station.

== Facilities ==
Kristiansand Naval Air Station was located at Tangen in downtown Kristiansand on the shoreline between the streets of Elvegaten and Kronprinsens gate. This was a lot which was owned by the Army and was used for refresh training. The site had three hangars, one for land aircraft and two for seaplanes. The seaplane hangars measured 23 by 16 meters (75 by 52 ft) and were initially 7.6 meters (25 ft) tall. The station also had a barracks, a fuel storage, a coal storage and a series of smaller buildings.

== Bibliography ==
- Bakken, Rolf; Jæger, Ingrid W.; Krageboen, Sven (1989). Kr.sand lufthavn, Kjevik 50 år 1939–1989 (in Norwegian). Kristiansand. ISBN 82-991887-0-9.
- Hafsten, Bjørn; Arheim, Tom (2003). Marinens flygevåpen 1912–1944 (in Norwegian). TankeStreken. ISBN 82-993535-1-3.
- Henriksen, Vera (1994). Luftforsvarets historie – I: Fra opptakt til nederlag (in Norwegian). Oslo: Aschehoug. ISBN 8203220681.
