= Arendal Town Hall =

Building in Arendal, Norway

Coordinates: 58°27′37.6122″N 8°45′53.56″E

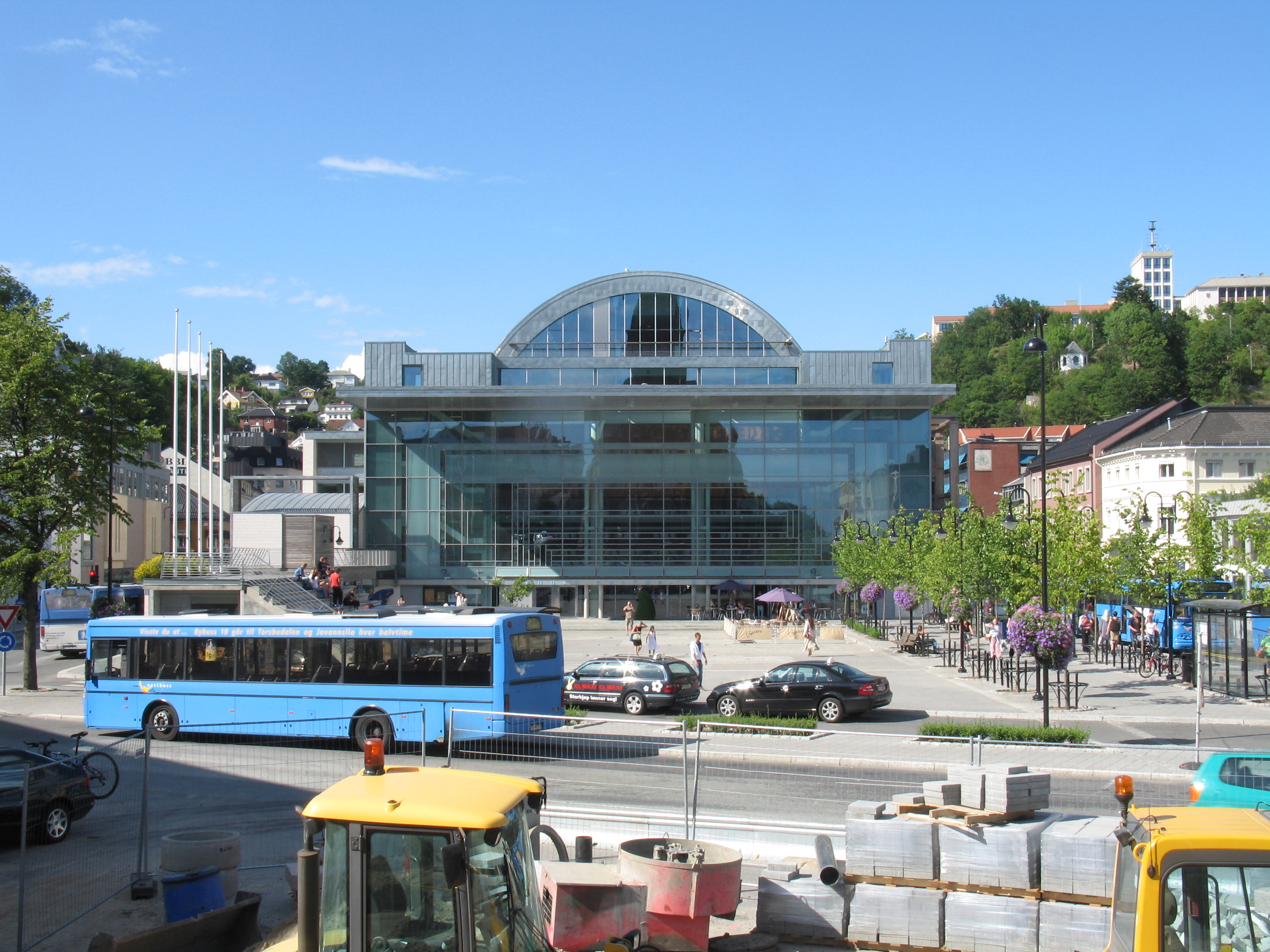
Arendal Town Hall was finished in 2004 while the official opening was held on 4 March 2005

Arendal Town hall (Norwegian: Arendal rådhus og kulturhus) is located in the middle of downtown Arendal, Norway. The building's two theater halls have been given names from the two lighthouses outside Arendal, Store Torungen Lighthouse and Lille Torungen Lighthouse.

Central to the building is a large hall, and surrounding this hall are communal offices. In front of the Town hall lies Sam Eydes plass, and surrounding the block are bus and taxi stops.

The building is designed by the architect company LPO Arkitektur & Design AS in Oslo.

The building's largest theater and concert hall, Store Torungen, has 700 seats. The chairs can be pushed back into the rear wall, which gives place to 1300 standing people. A smaller hall, Lille Torungen, has 150 seats.
