= Kjell Nupen =

Norwegian artist

- Born: September 5, 1955 Kristiansand, Norway
- Died: March 12, 2014 (aged 58) Kristiansand, Norway
- Areas: painter, sculptor and graphic artist
- Awards: full list

Kjell Nupen (September 5, 1955 – March 12, 2014) was a Norwegian contemporary artist. He was a painter, sculptor and graphic artist.

== Early years ==
Kjell Nupen had his professional breakthrough very early. At just 17 years old, he was admitted to Norwegian National Academy of Fine Arts. Since he was believed to be 18, his admission caused some difficulties but he finally could start after being given an exemption. He experienced success early on, and at the age of just 19, his art was bought by the National Museum of Art, Architecture and Design (Riksgalleriet),Nasjonalgalleriet and Norsk Kulturråd.

His younger artistic years were coloured by radical political expressions influenced by the turbulent political times that existed in Europe. During his time at Staatliche Kunstakademie in Düsseldorf, he embraced the idea, so present at the academy, that art should mean something. (Paintings from this time: Situation (Ulrike M), from 1976 and Fargelagt idyll from 1979) This has resulted in a few symbols he has immersed himself in over the years, such as: The boat (endless journey), Car wrecks (Nature morte), Eagle in flight, Tree trunks (Homestead), Lighthouse (Sentimental journey), and the Munch moon (Homage to Edvard Munch).

== Later years and death ==
During the 1980s the people disappeared from his pictures and were replaced by motifs from nature. His later paintings are focused on themes such as quietness and belonging to or lack thereof. His references to Edvard Munch, Matisse, and Eadweard Muybridge can be seen in many of his paintings (Homage to E.M., Interiør, eksteriør and Flygende over vann) He became especially known for the colour Nupen blue. He died on March 12, 2014, from cancer at the age of 58.

== Major works in public ==
Besides being a figurative painter he was a respected graphic artist. Most of his paper art is within etching, lithography and wood-block print. In this field he has worked as mentor for several other artists. His art can be found in museums and major art collections both in and outside Norway.

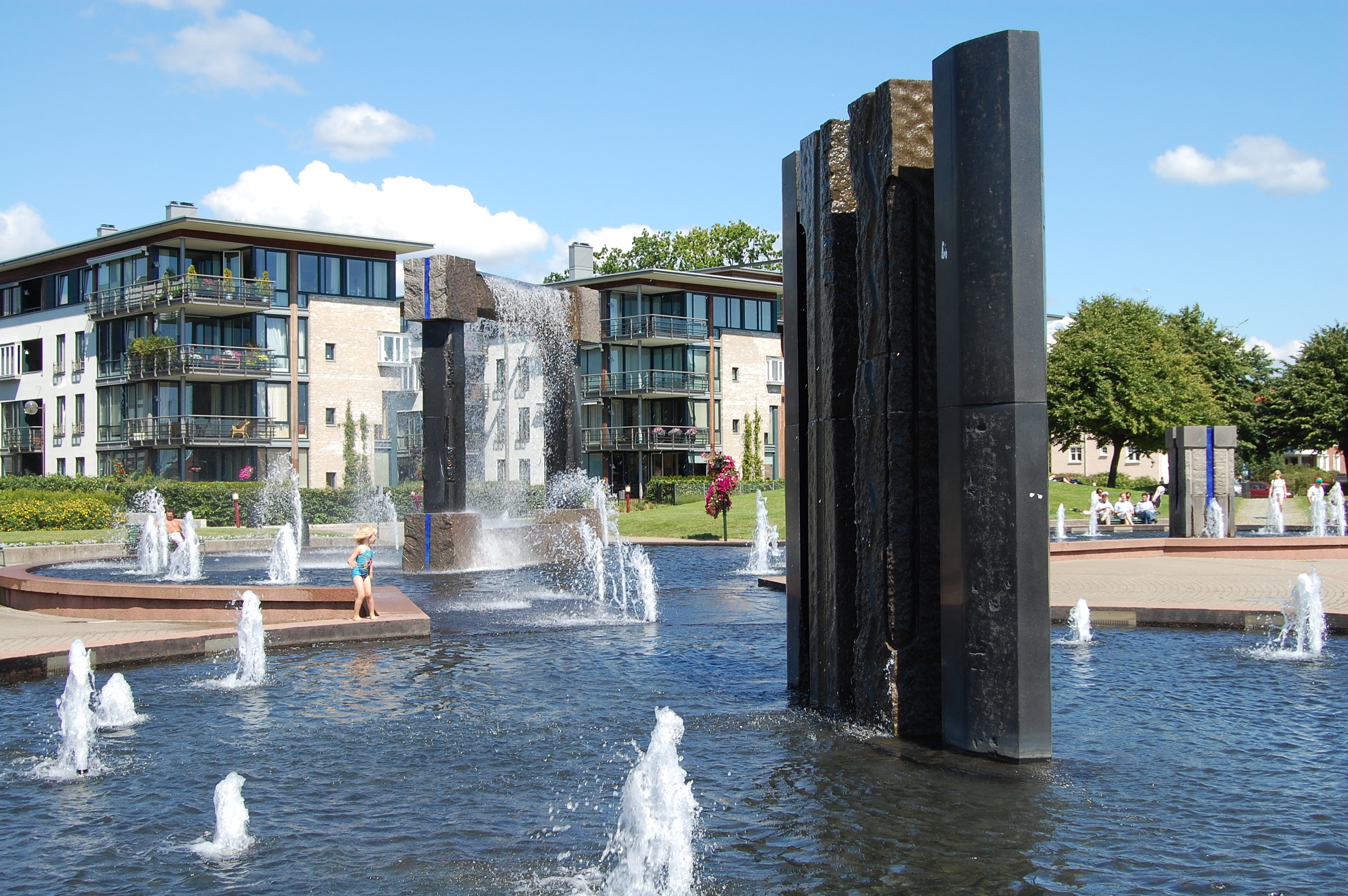
Fountain in Otterdalsparken, Kristiansand

Though Kjell Nupen did see himself as a painter first and foremost, he worked with many different mediums such as granite, ceramic, glass, steel and bronze. Besides having many exhibitions in and outside Norway, he has done several major projects in the public, such as: Otterdalsparken in Kristiansand (also called Nupenparken), Silkeborg Danmark, Statoil Stavanger, Søm Church in Kristiansand, Ansgarkapellet in Kristiansand, Geilo Kulturkirke in Geilo, Olsvik Church in Bergen, Telemark sykehus in Porsgrunn, the town hall in Viborg in Denmark in cooperation with Gallery NB in Viborg, which he had cooperated with since 1998. Helsfyr Atrium in Oslo, Husnes torv in Husnes, Forum Jæren in Bryne and Broerenkerk, a church from 1504 in Zwolle in the Netherlands - now unconsecrated and changed into a major book and culture centre.

== Education ==
- Statens Kunstakademi in Oslo, 1972–75. Studied under: Reidar Aulie, Knut Rose, Ludvig Eikaas
- Staatliche Kunstakademie in Düsseldorf, 1975–76. Studied under: Gerhard Richter, K.O.Gutz and Rolf Sackheim
