= Kvadraturen =

Kvadraturen is a description used by Norwegian city areas with quadrant-based, grid planned streets. This often refers to the city planning by Christian IV, King of Denmark–Norway.

- Kvadraturen (Kristiansand), a borough in the city of Kristiansand, Norway
- Kvadraturen (Oslo), a neighborhood in the city of Oslo, Norway
- Kvadraturen (Gjøvik), an area in the city of Gjøvik, Norway
