= Kvadraturen (Kristiansand) =

Borough in Kristiansand Municipality, Norway

- Borough of Kristiansand
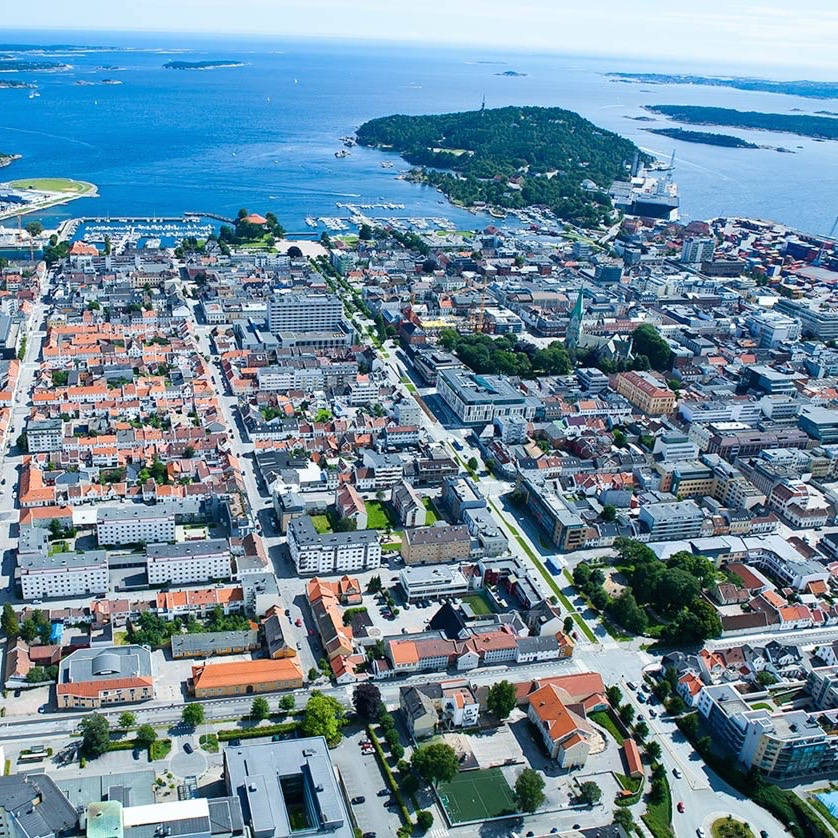
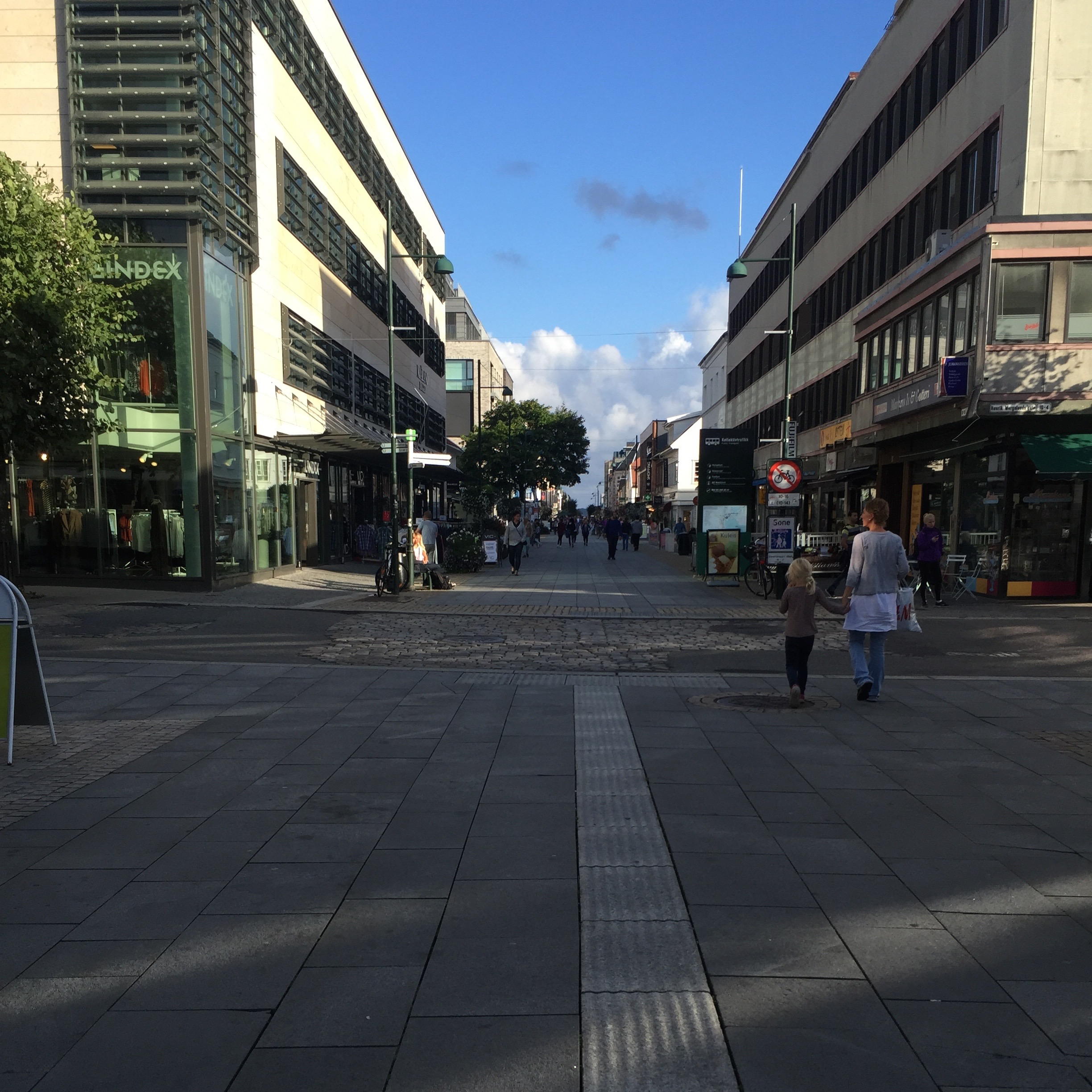
- Descending, from top: Kvadraturen also known as downtown, bottom: Markens gate

- Coat of arms

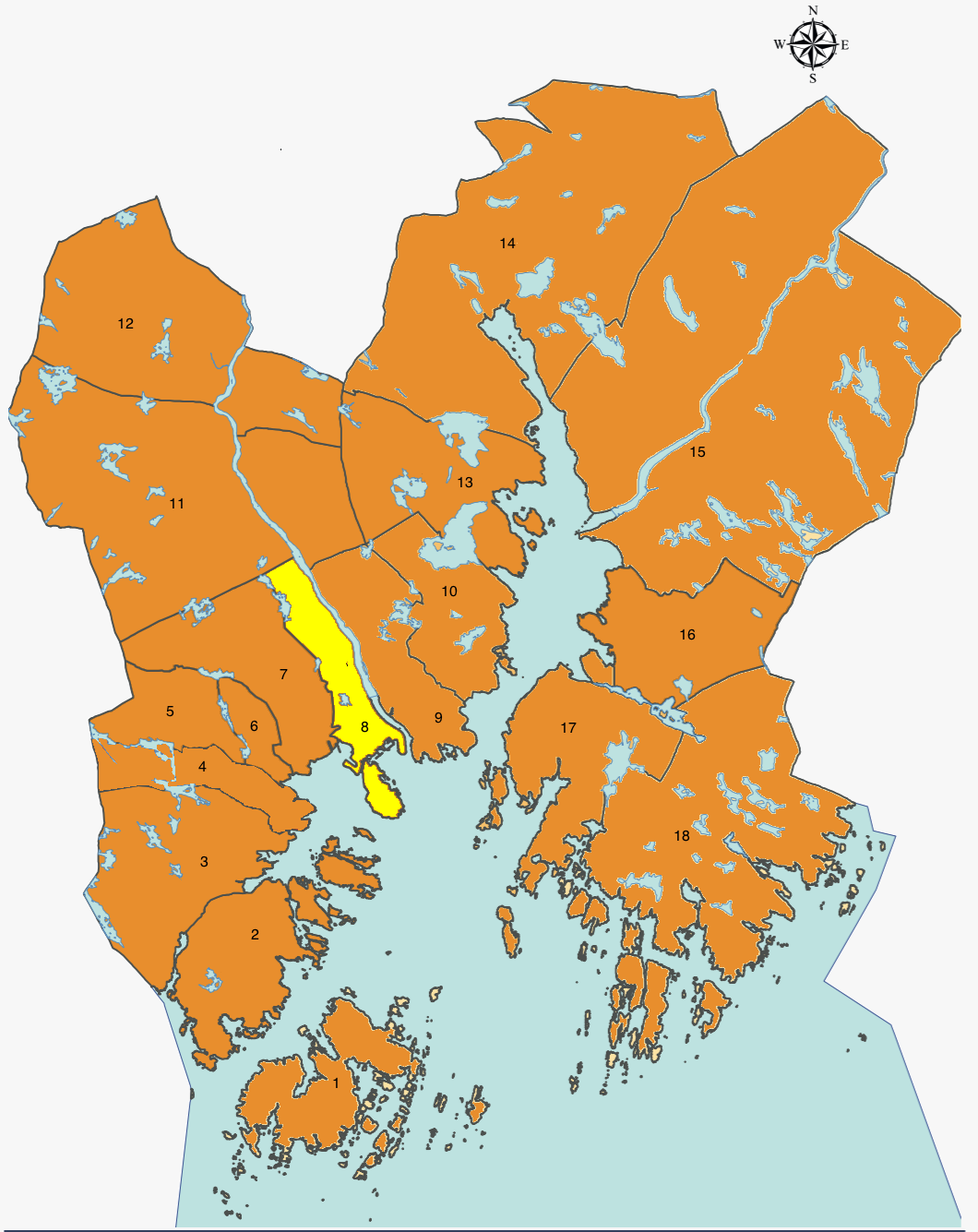
- Location of Kvadraturen, shown in yellow, in Kristiansand
- Interactive map of Kvadraturen
- Coordinates: 58.1468°N 07.9953°E
- Country: Norway
- Region: Southern Norway
- County: Agder
- Municipality: Kristiansand Municipality
- Elevation: 7 m (23 ft)

Population (2015)
  - Total: 6,750
- Time zone: UTC+01:00 (CET)
  - Summer (DST): UTC+02:00 (CEST)
- Post Code prefix: 460*, 461*
- Website: kvadraturen.no kristiansand.kommune.no

Kvadraturen is a borough in the city centre of the city of Kristiansand which lies in Kristiansand Municipality in Agder county, Norway. It has a population of 6,750 (2015). The borough is made up of the centre together with the harbour to the south and the more rural district of "Eg" to the north. Kvadraturen is the administrative centre of the municipality of Kristiansand as well as the administrative centre of Agder county, but is far smaller in area than the other boroughs in the municipality, such as the borough of Grim to the north and west, and the borough of Lund to the east.

Kvadraturen is the location of the Kristiansand Cathedral and the nearby commercial, pedestrian street is Markens gate. The city harbour is located along the Kristiansandsfjorden and the island of Odderøya. The borough has three malls and three high schools. The closest public junior high is "Grim Skole" and the closest elementary is Tordenskjoldsgate Skole and is the only remanding elementary in Kvadraturen. The Sørlandet Hospital Kristiansand is also located in the borough, in the district of Eg.

The main city centre was established as a city on 5 July 1641 by King Christian IV. The city became a self-governing municipality under the formannskapsdistrikt law on 1 January 1838. On 1 July 1921, a neighboring part of Oddernes Municipality (population: 2,164) was transferred from Oddernes to the city of Kristiansand. During the 1960s, there were many municipal mergers across Norway due to the work of the Schei Committee. On 1 January 1965, the city of Kristiansand (population: 27,100) was merged with the neighboring Randesund Municipality (population: 1,672), Oddernes Municipality (population: 18,668), and Tveit Municipality (population: 2,802) to form an enlarged Kristiansand Municipality.

== Commerce ==
Markens gate is the main pedestrian street in Kristiansand. It is one of Norway's most walked street and is over 2,778 feet (847 meters) long. The street has many different stores. The walking zone stretches over seven blocks. During the 1600-1700s, the street was called Dronningens gate, and today its also nicknamed Stripen (The Strip).

The most central part of the city is lower Markens where it meets Tollbodgata. Some stores here are open 24/7 and it is here most crimes of downtown Kristiansand take place.

There are three malls at Kvadraturen: Sandens is the largest and newest one, Slottet Shopping is located at the north end of Markens gate in the north. Lille Markens is the smallest mall.

== Transportation ==
Kristiansand Bus Terminal, Kristiansand Station, and Kristiansand Harbor are all located at Vestre Strandgate next to each other. Local buses goes from Henrik Wergelandsgate and Tollbodgata.

Kristiansand Station has daily trains to Oslo and Stavanger. Kristiansand Harbor has many daily ferry routes to Hirtshals, Denmark.

Kristiansand Airport, Kjevik is located 16 kilometres (9.9 mi) from the city center, and it has routes to the biggest cities in Norway, with less frequent routes to other Northern European cities.

== Education ==
There are two public and one private high schools and one elementary school in the borough of Kvadraturen. The elementary school has students from over 27 different nationalities. The closest junior high schools are in the nearby boroughs of Grim and Lund.

List of schools in Kvadraturen
Name	Location	Type
Kvadraturen skolesenter	Tollbodgata	High School
Noroff videregående skole	Elvegata	High School
Tangen High School	Tangen	High School
Tordenskjoldsgate skole	Nybyen	Elementary

== Politics ==
The largest political parties in Kvadraturen (2019):

Kristiansand city council votes from Kvadraturen 2019
Labour Party	21,7% (684 votes)
Conservative Party	19,4% (611 votes)
Socialist Left Party	10,3% (326 votes)
Green Party	10,0% (315 votes)
The Democrats	8,2% (257 votes)
Christian Democratic Party	6,6% (207 votes)
Liberal Party	5,7% (181 votes)
Progress Party	4,6% (144 votes)
Red	4,3% (135 votes)
Centre	2,8% (89 votes)
The Christians Party	1,2% (37 votes)
Pensioners' Party	0,9%% (28 votes)
The Capitalist Party	0,4% (14 votes)
Health Party	0,4% (12 votes)
Others	3,6% (112 votes)
Total	7 386 votes

== Tourism ==
The borough of Kvadraturen is the site of many tourist attractions. Christiansholm Fortress was built in 1672. The Kilden Theatre, the largest culture house and theatre in Southern Norway, is located on the island of Odderøya. It was finished in 2012 and has a capacity of over 2,000.

Fiskebrygga (The Fish Wharf), a former fish landing in Kvadraturen with Odderøya, has been redeveloped as a restaurant, shopping, and tourist destination.

== Neighbourhoods ==
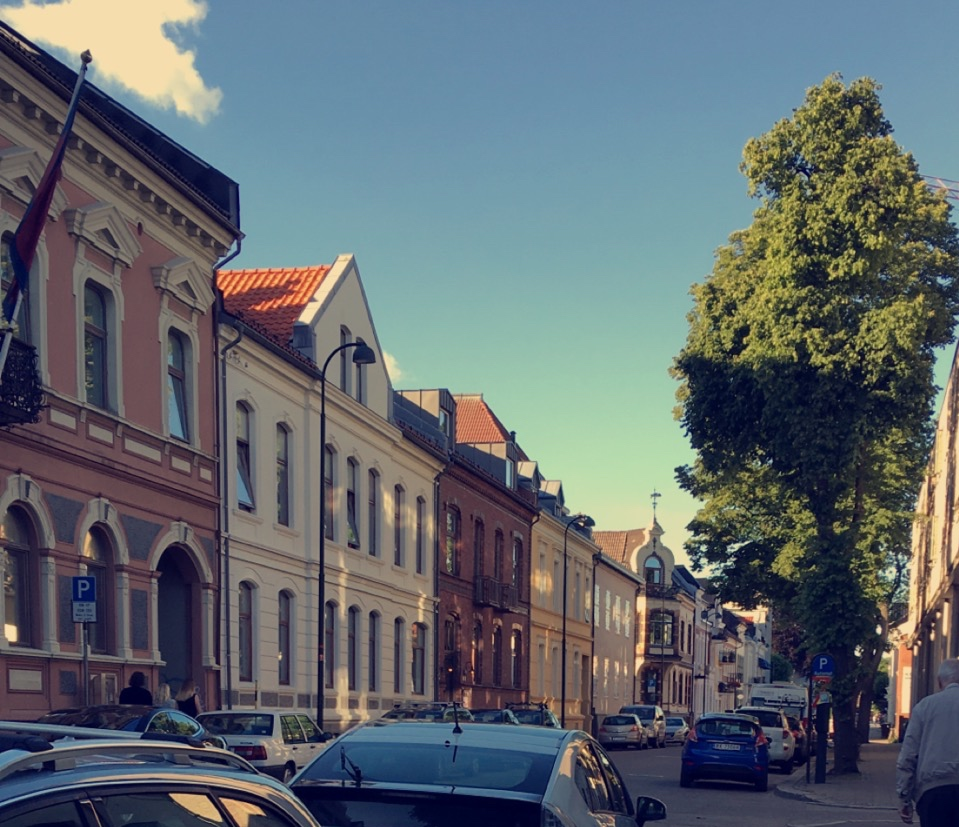
Kvadraturen sørøst

- Baneheia
- Byskogen
- Bystranda
- Eg
- Fiskebrygga
- Lagmannsholmen
- Nybyen
- Odderøya
- Posebyen
- Strandpromenaden
- Tangen

== Media gallery ==
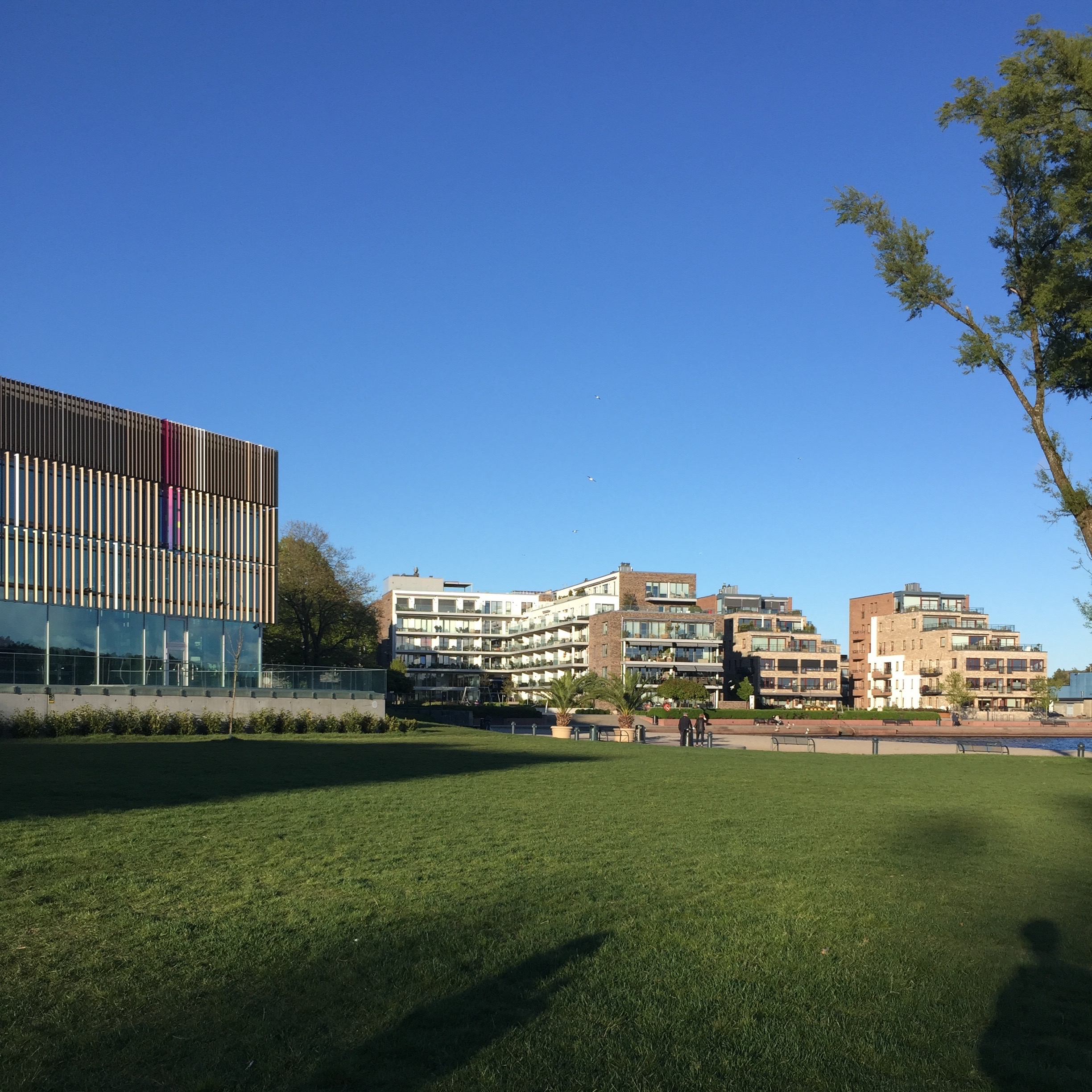
Aquarama

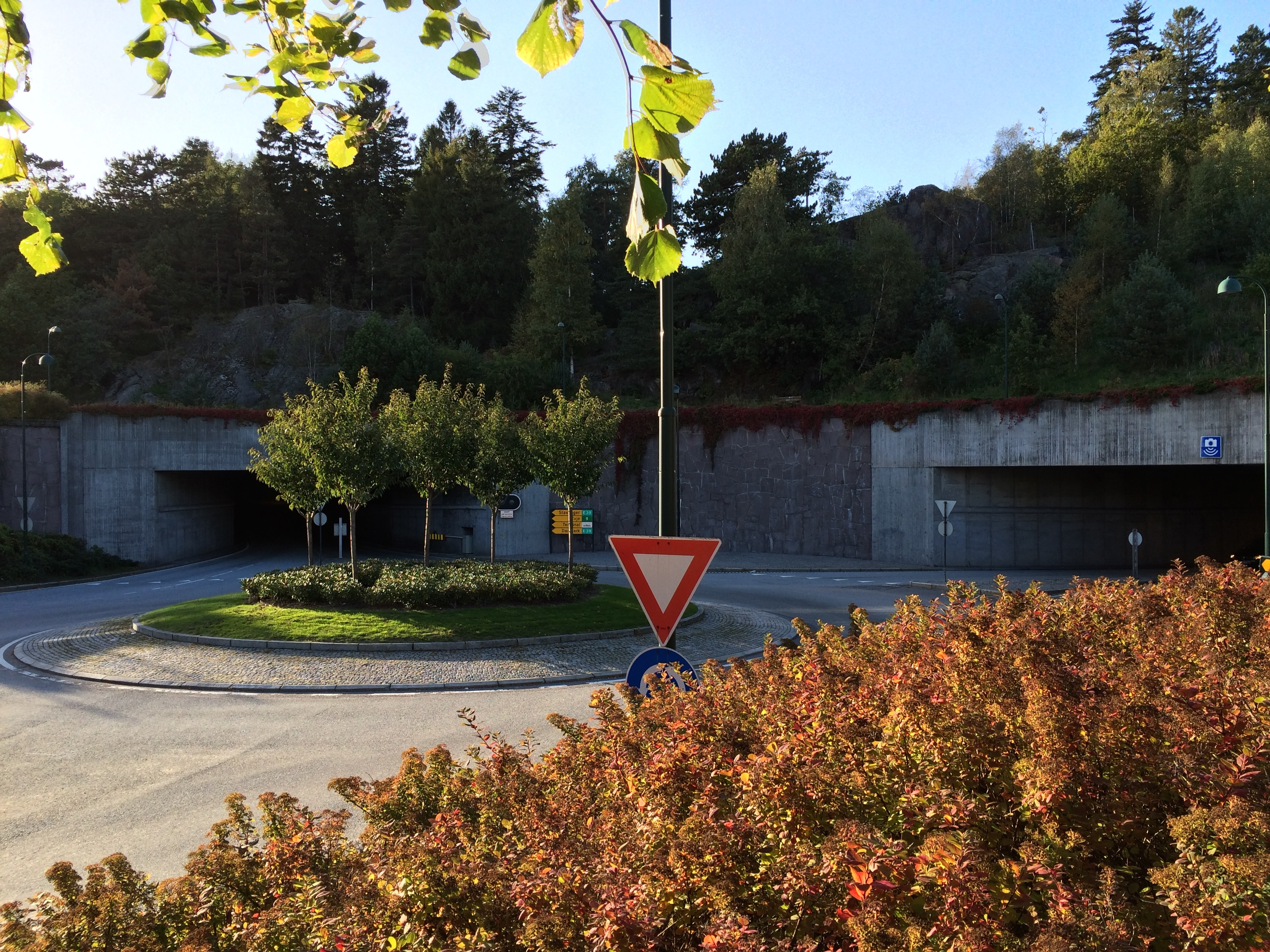
Baneheia

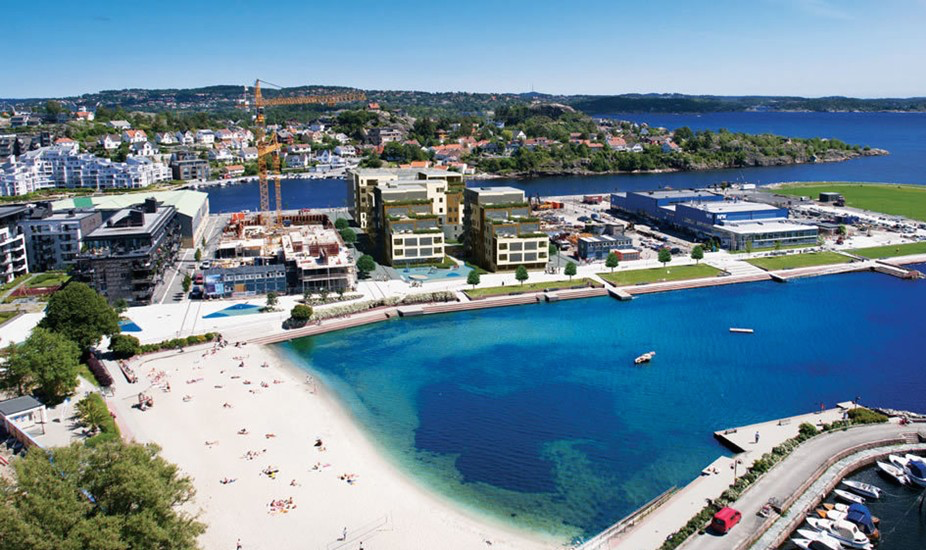
Bystranda

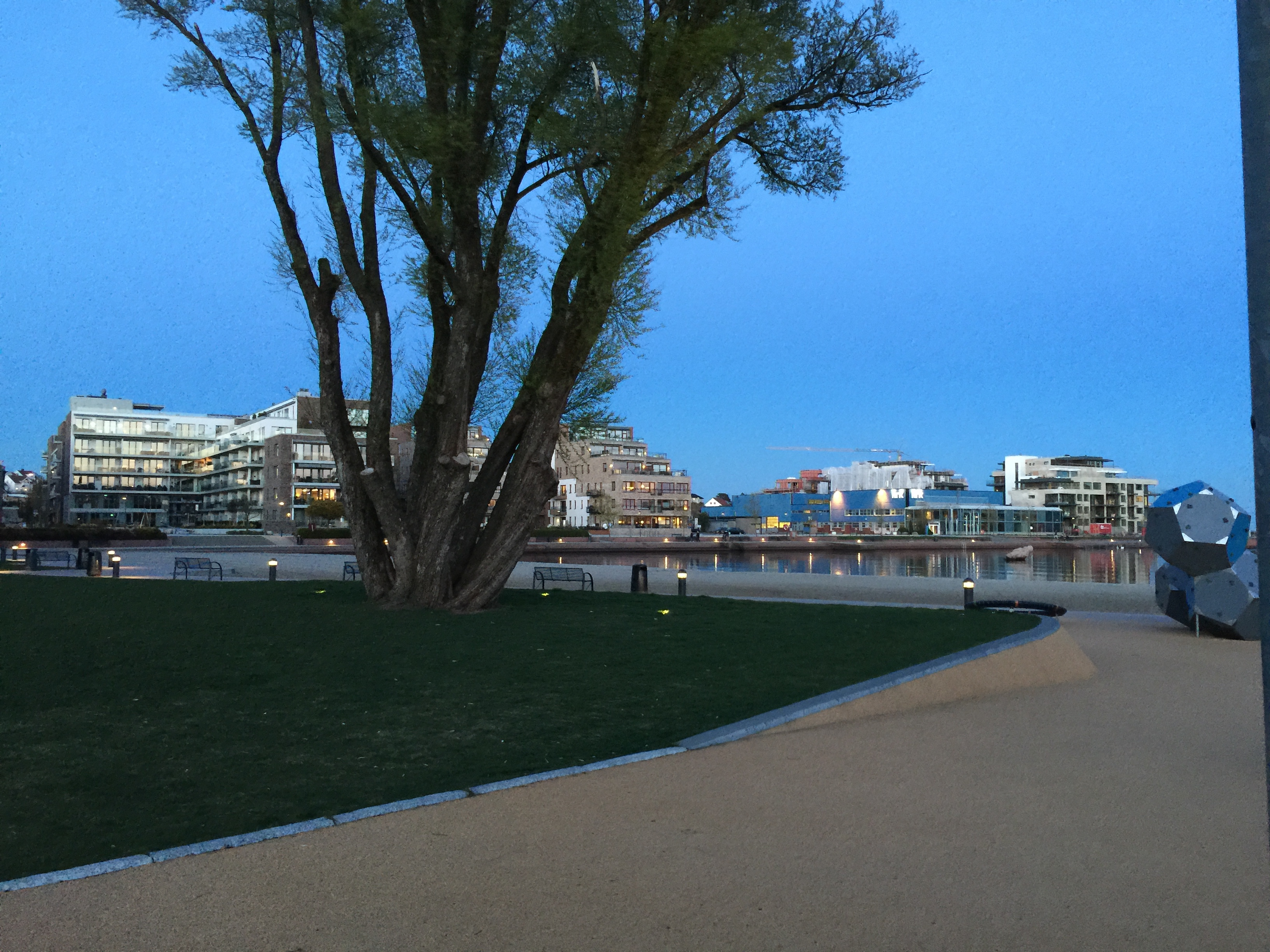
Bystranda park

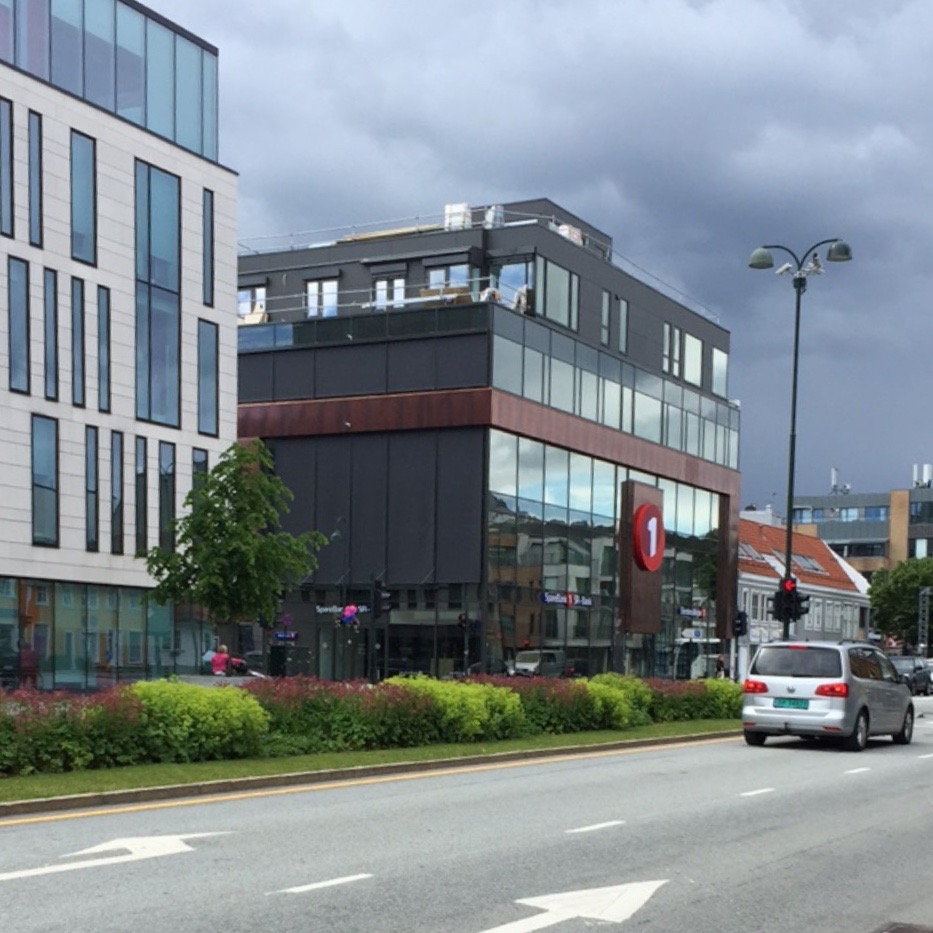
Gyldengården

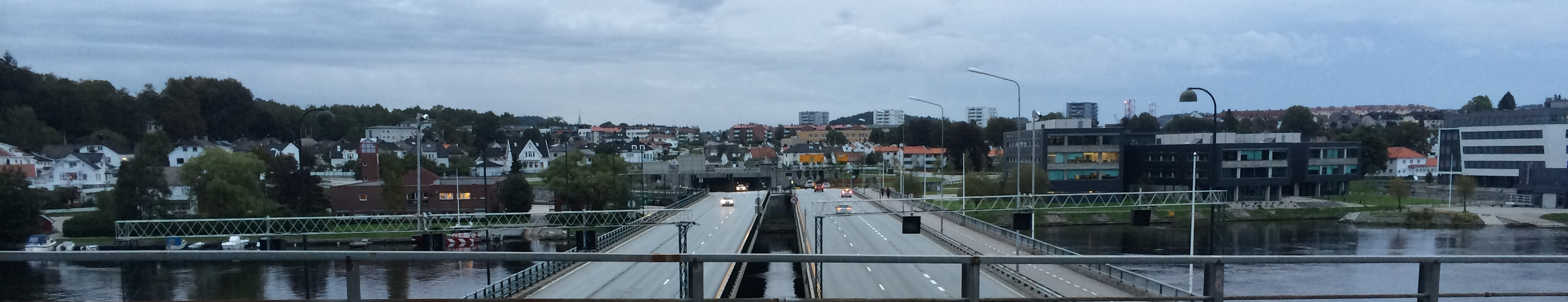
Highway E18 from eastern Kristiansand to Kvadraturen

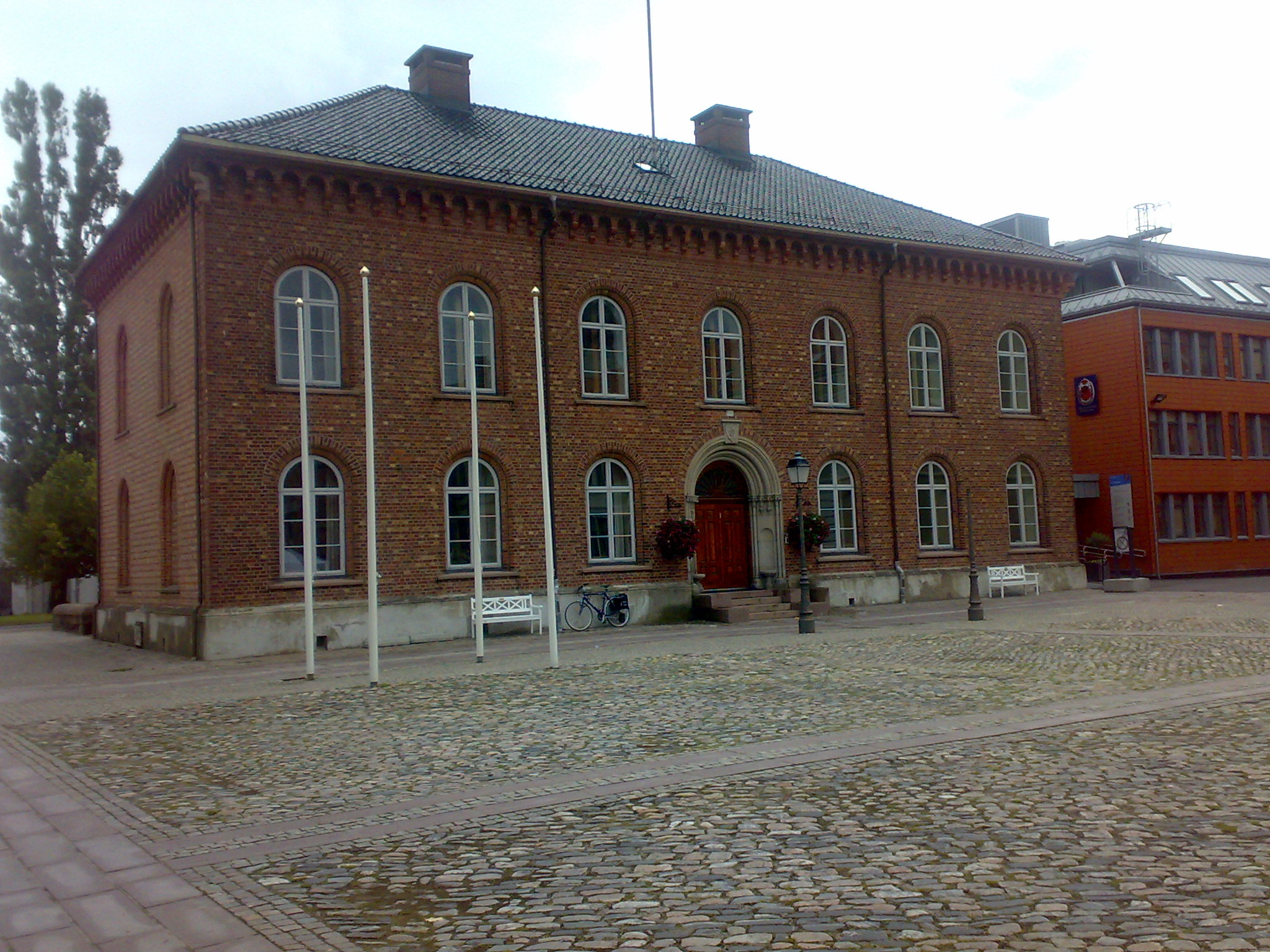
Kristiansand City Hall

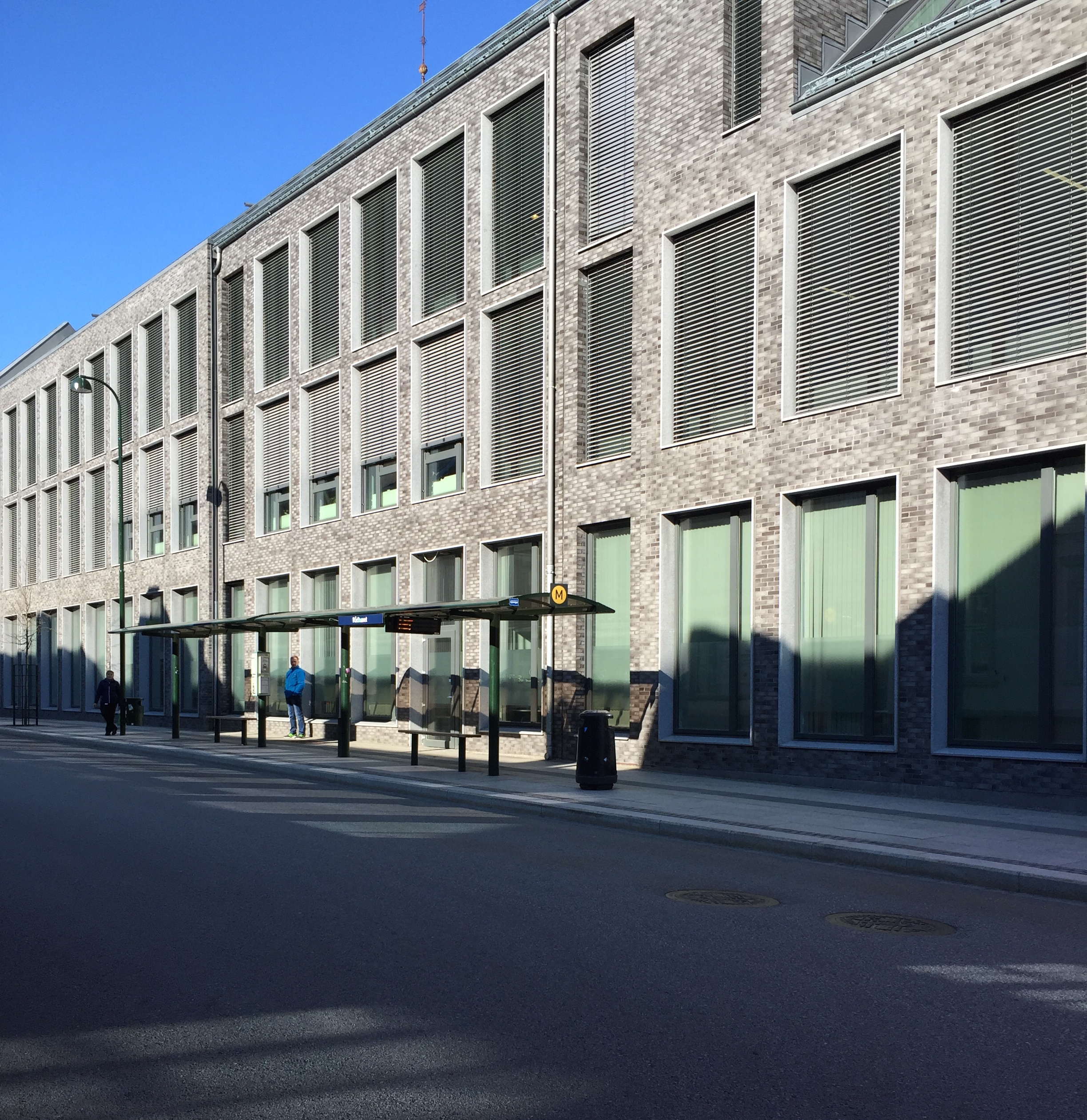
Kristiansand City Hall

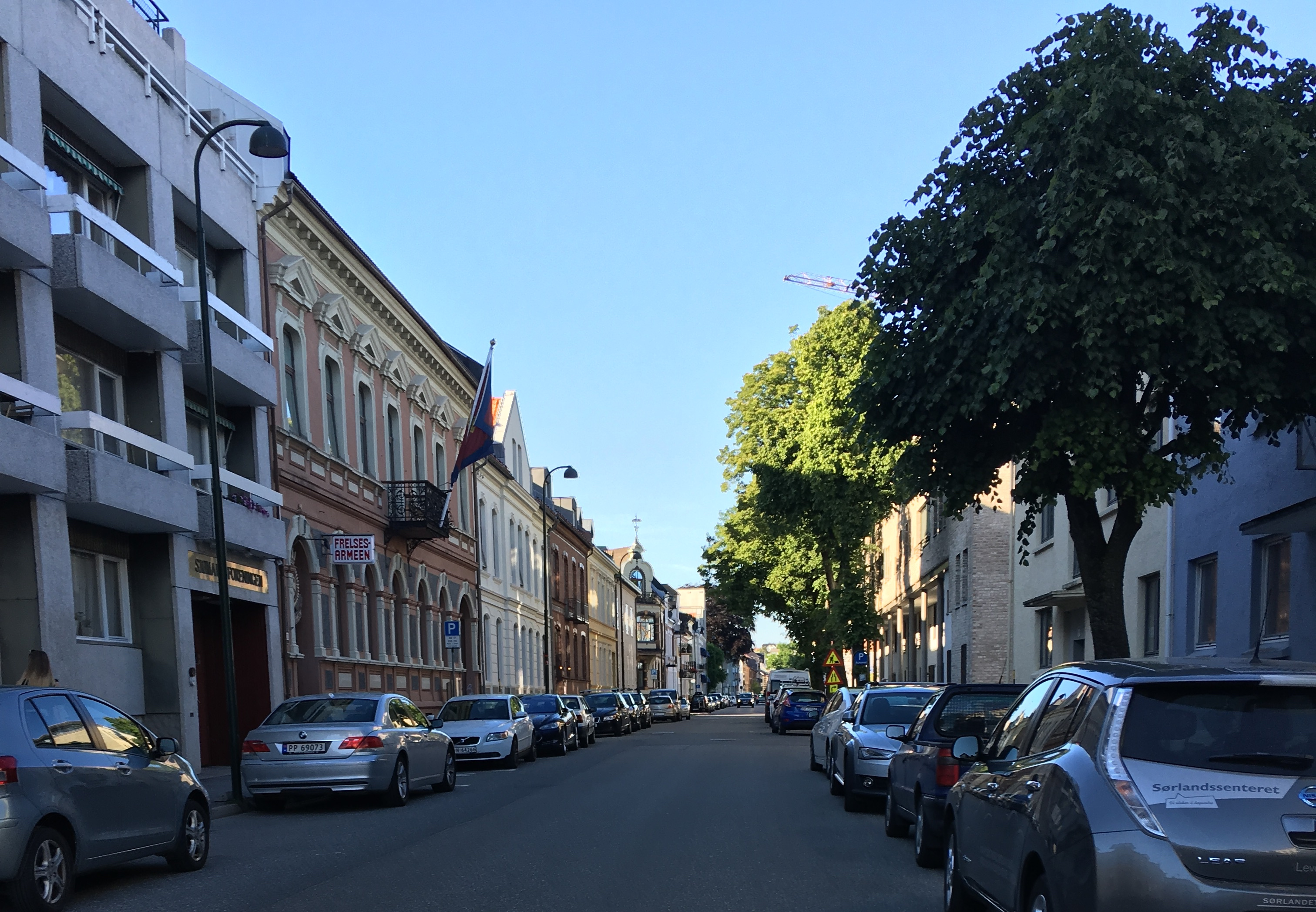
Kongens gate (Kings street)

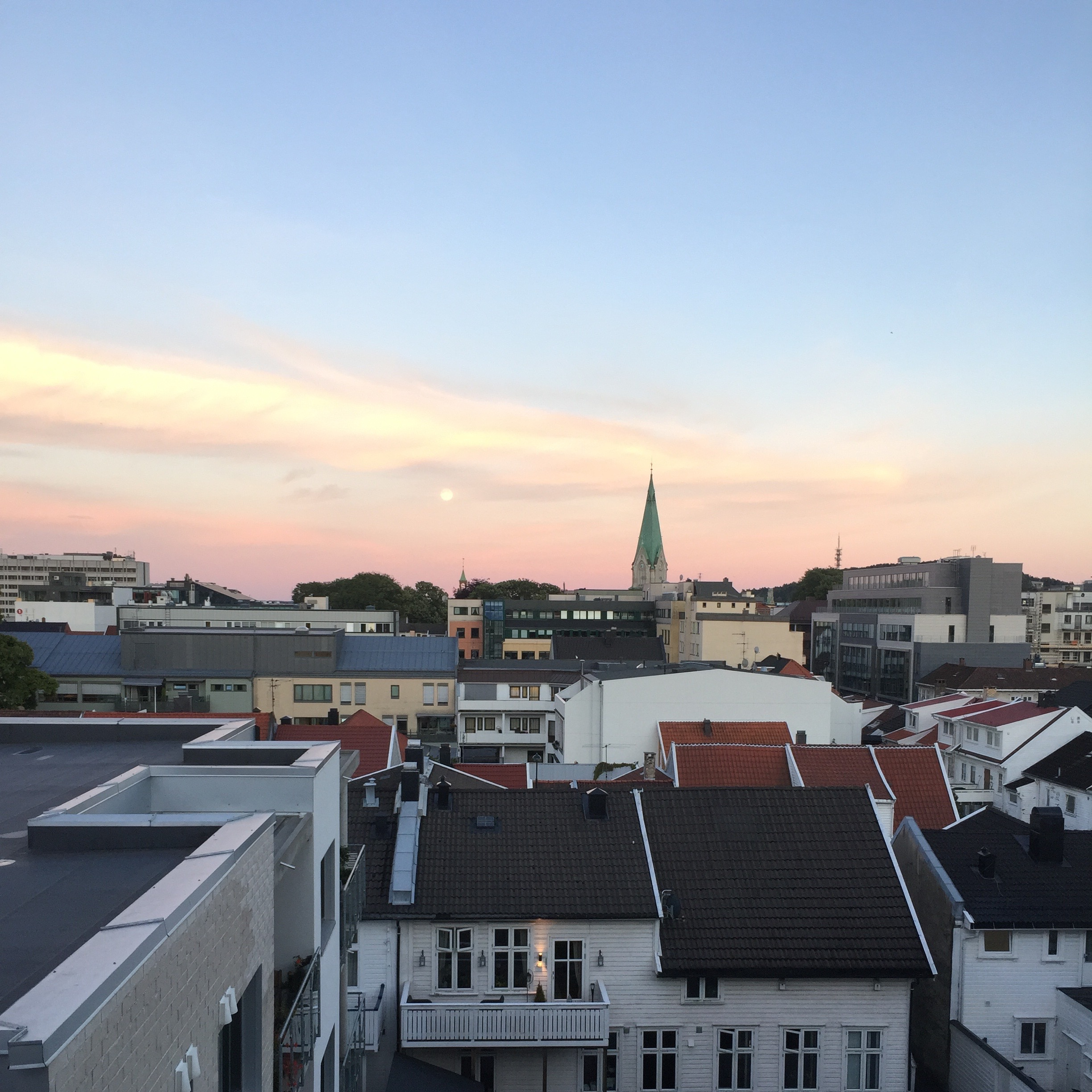
Kvadraturen from Baneheia

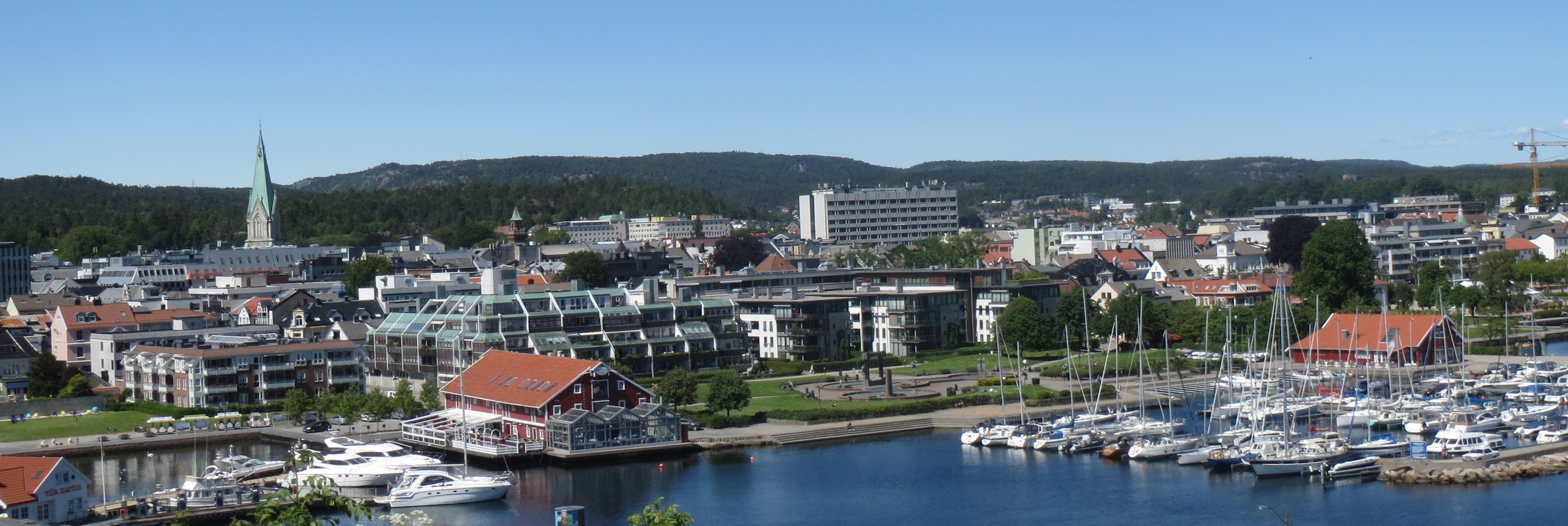
Kvadraturen seen from Odderøya

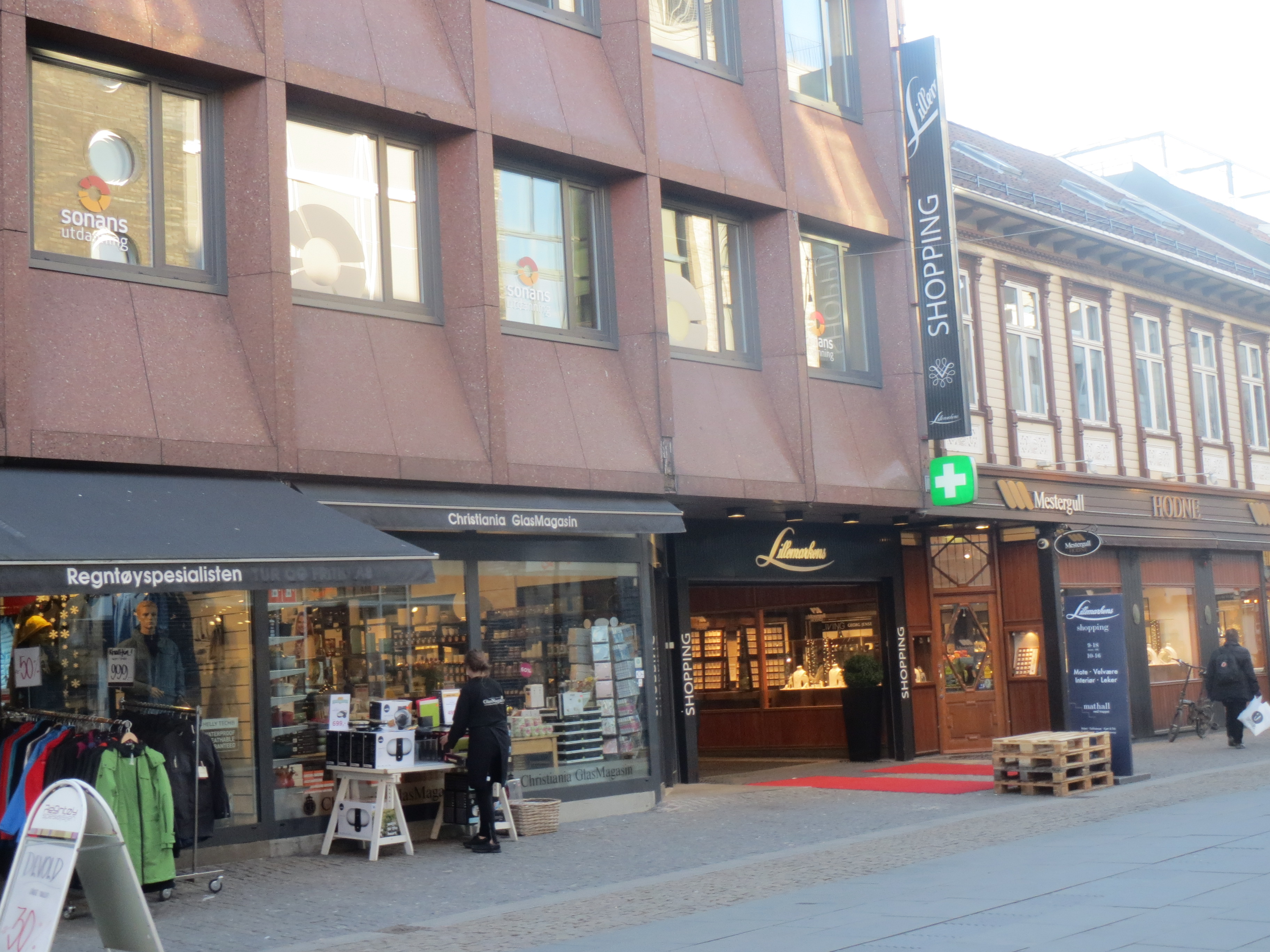
Lillemarkens mall

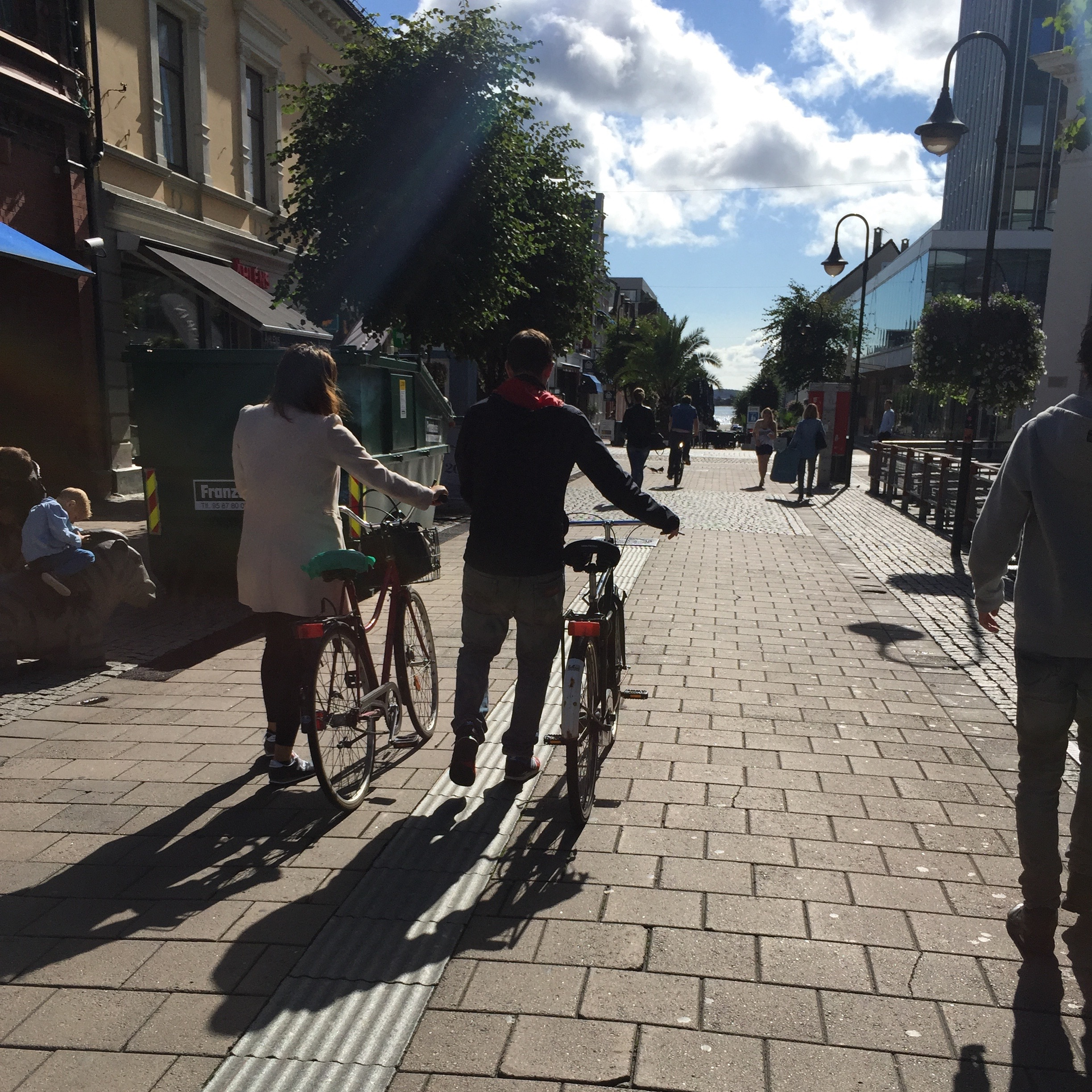
Markens gate

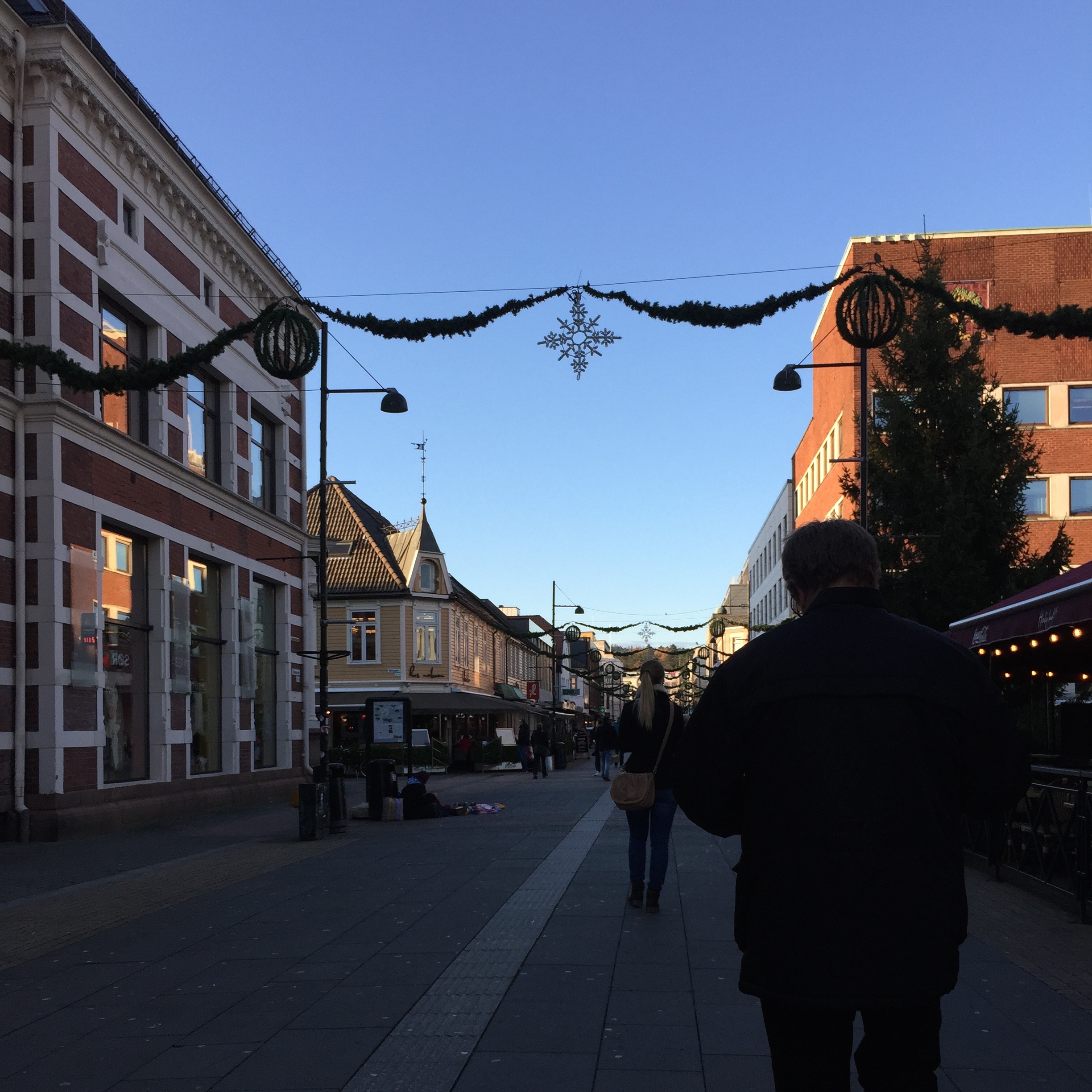
Markens gate during Christmas

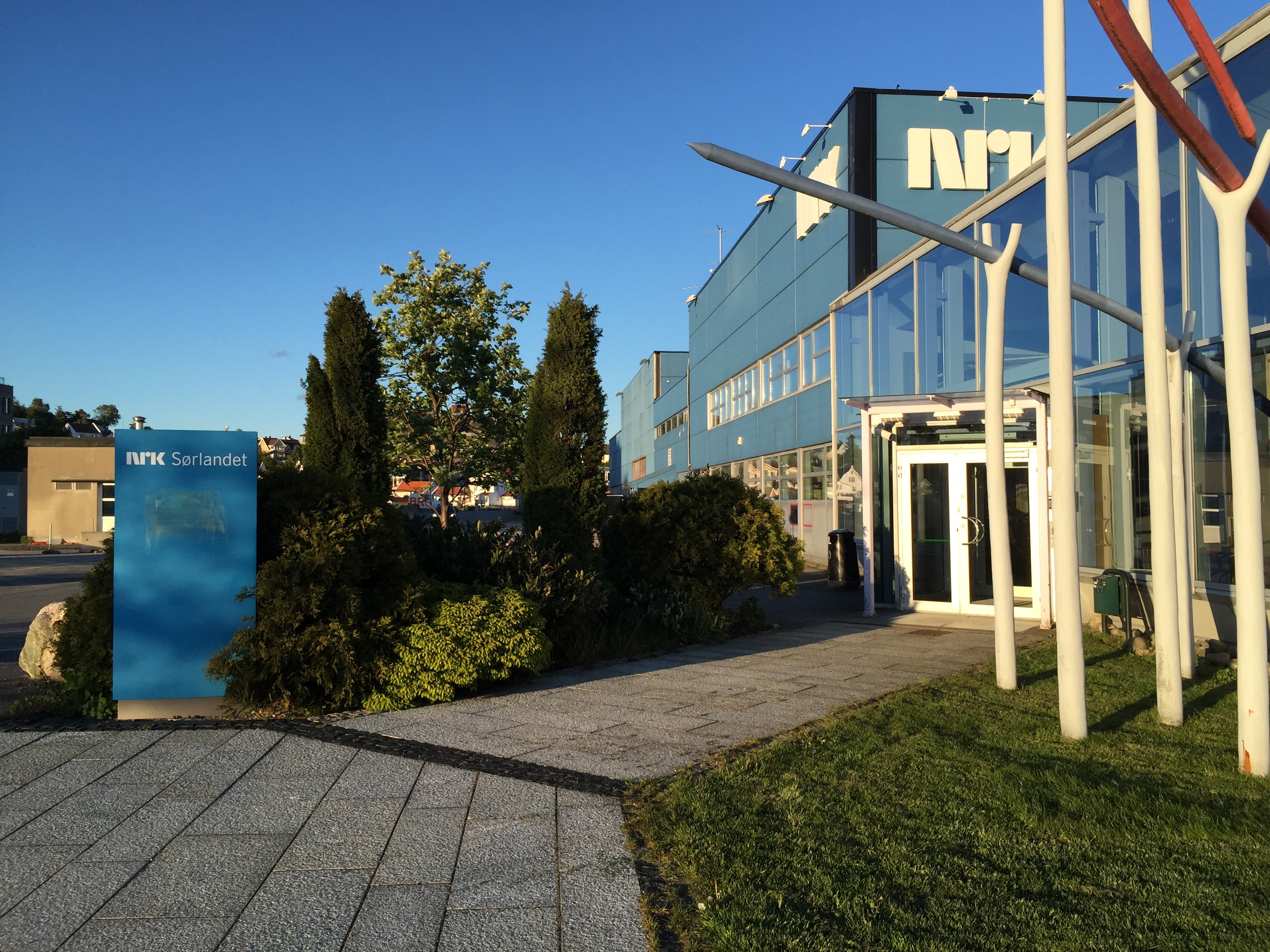
NRK's headquarter for Sørlandet at Tangen

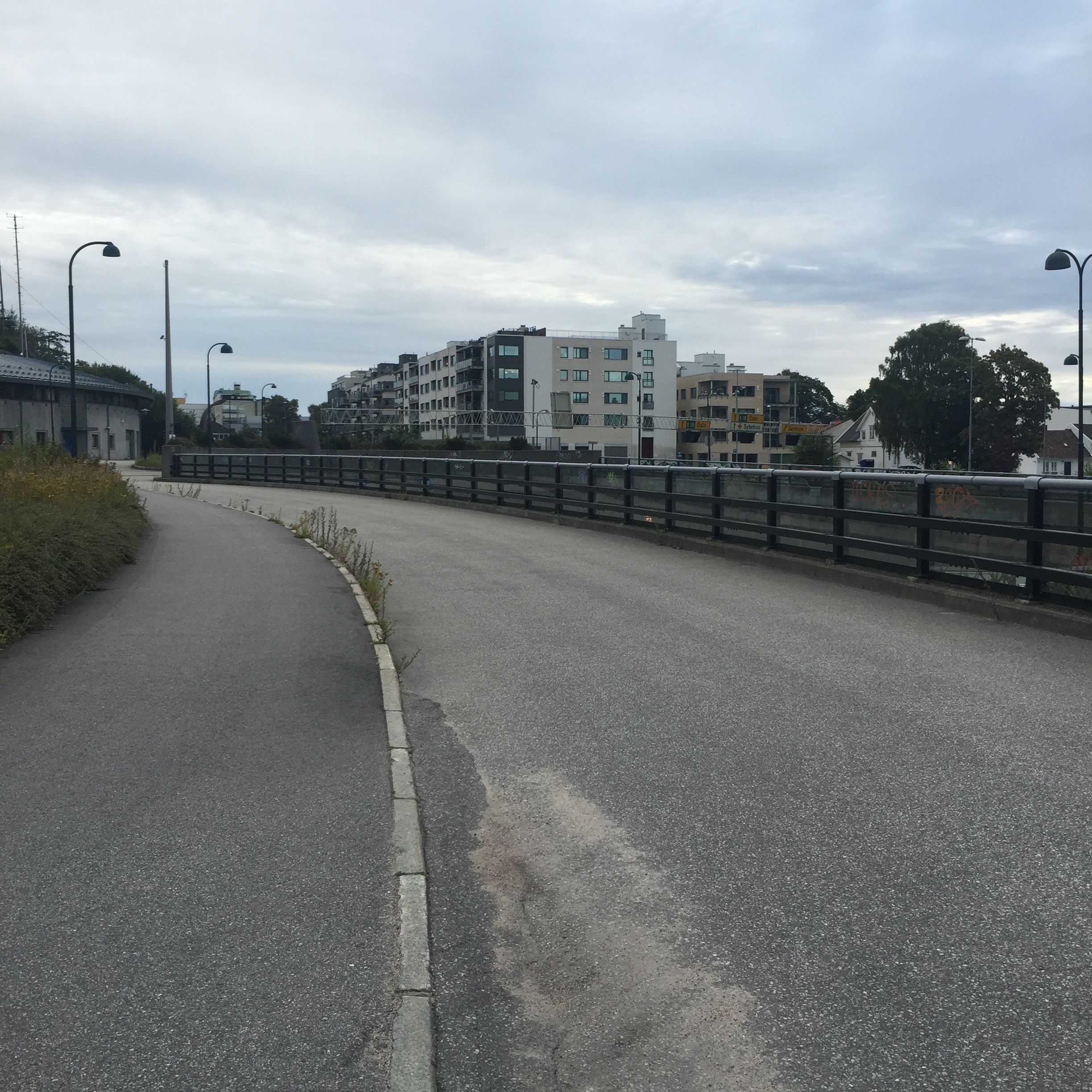
Nybyen

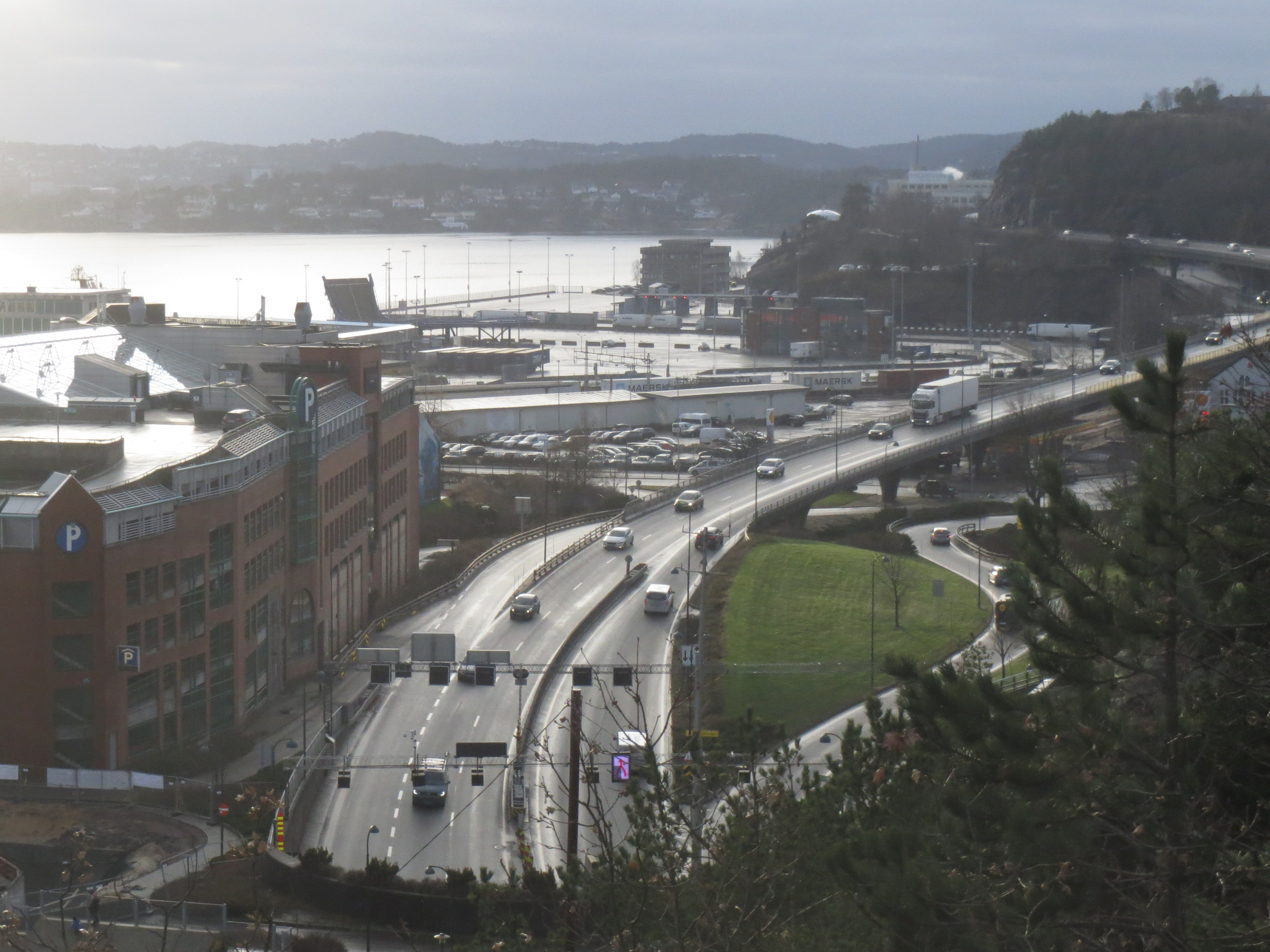
Gartnerløkka

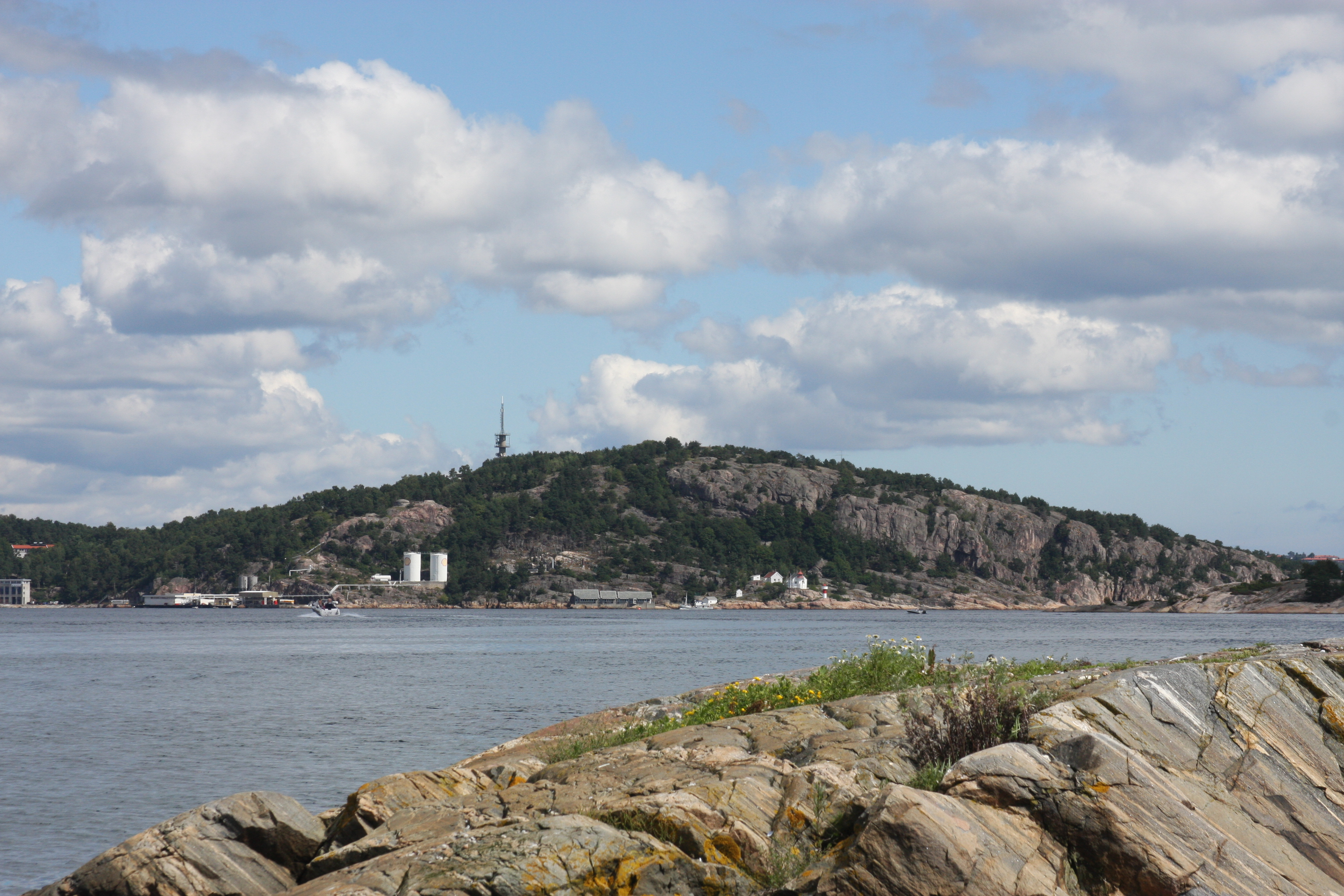
Odderøya

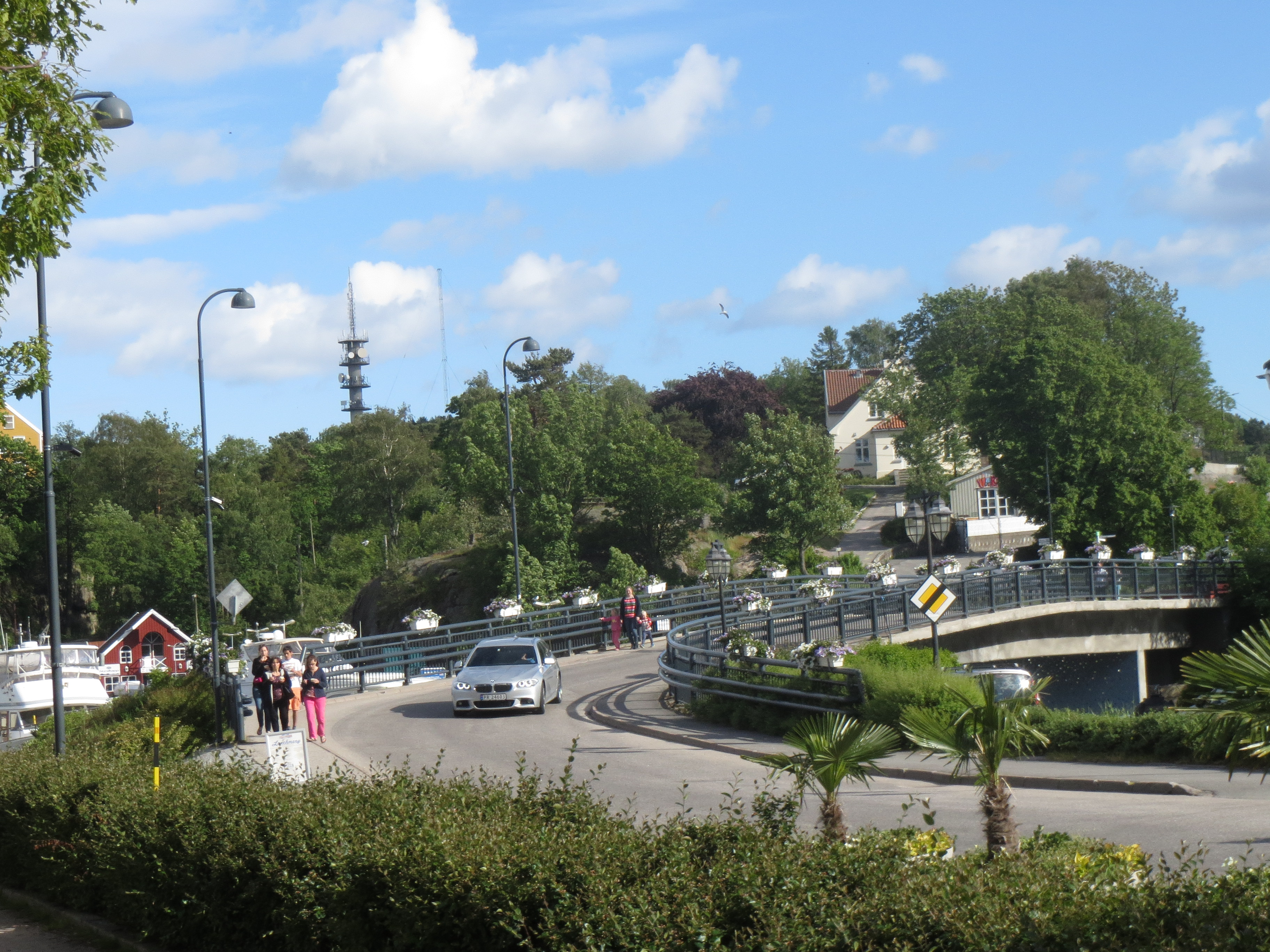
Odderøya bridge

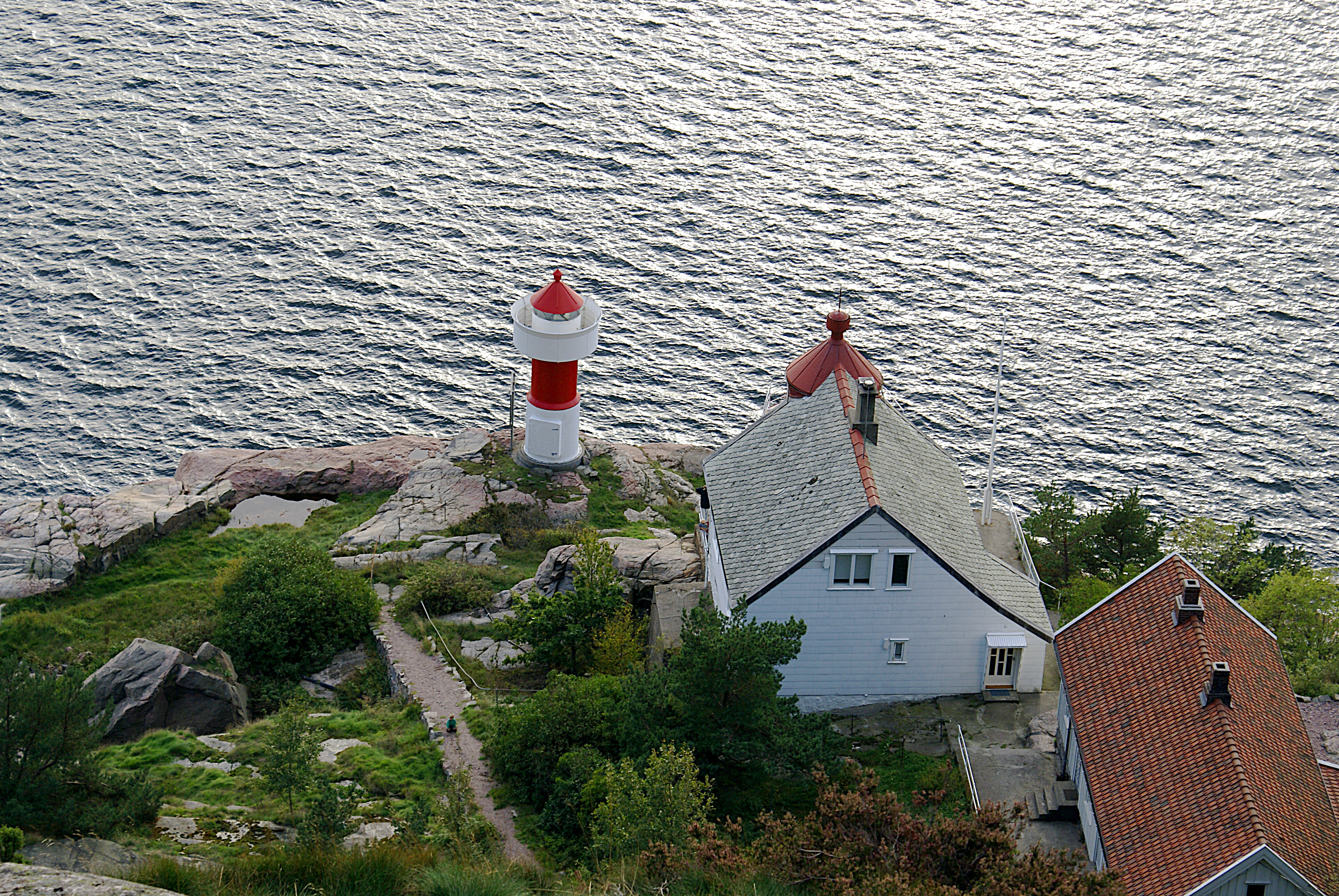
Odderøya Lighthouse

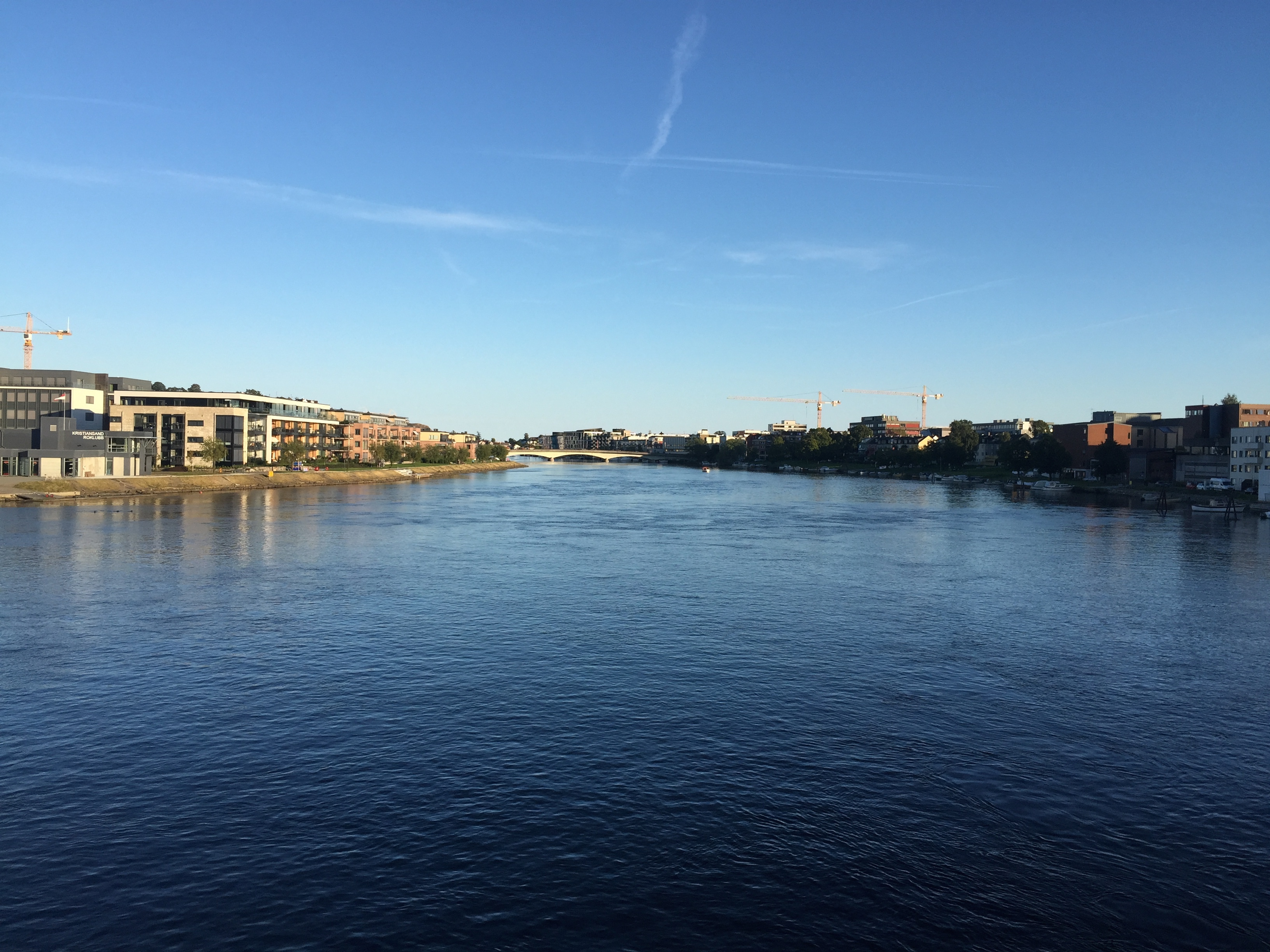
Otra river between Lund (left) and Kvadraturen (right)

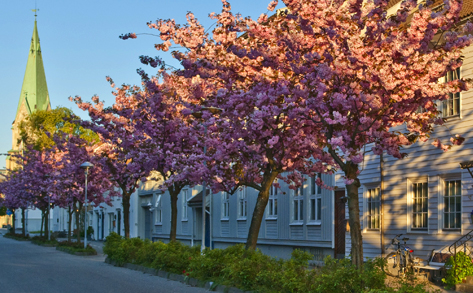
Posebyen with Rådhusgata

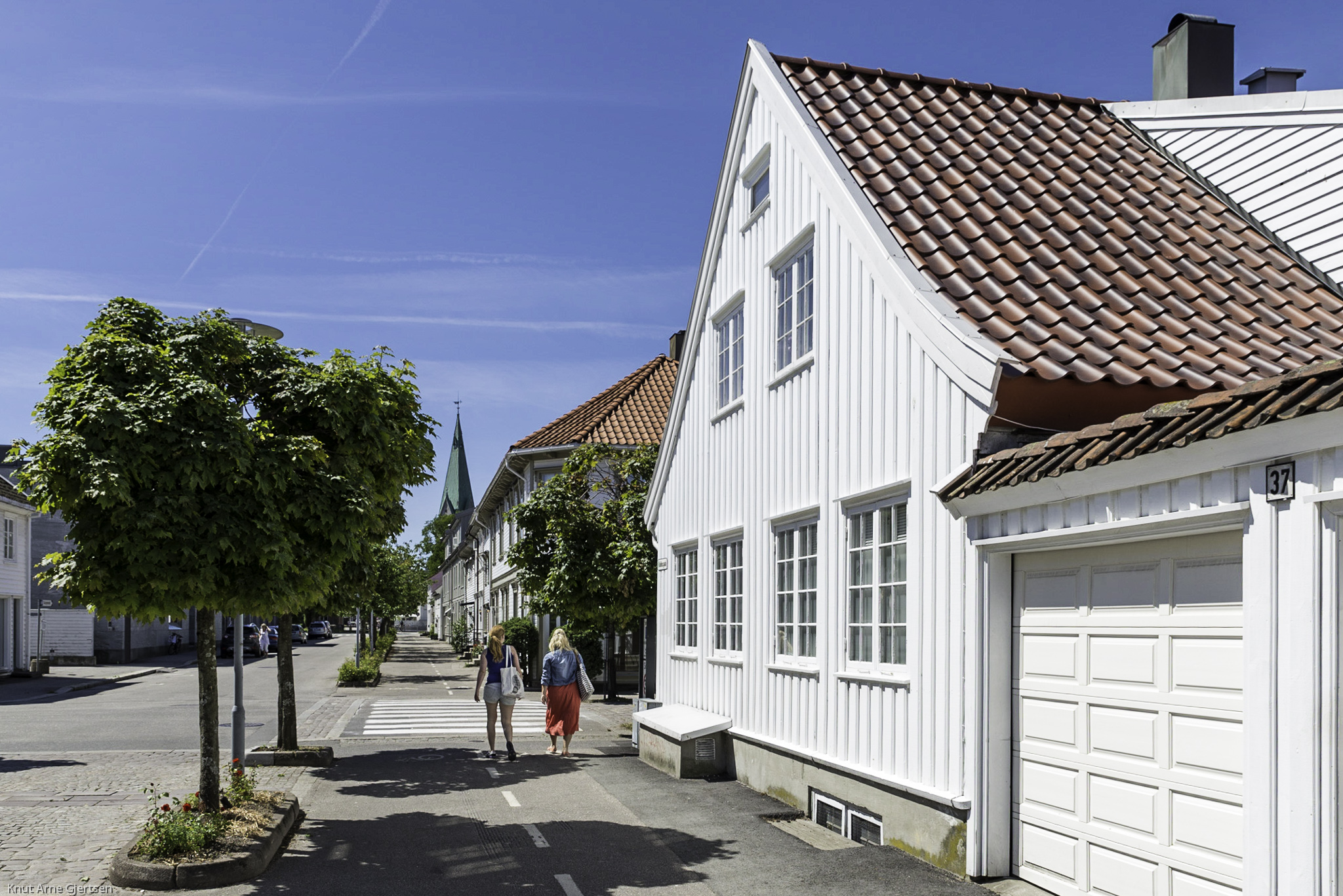
Posebyen with Rådhusgata

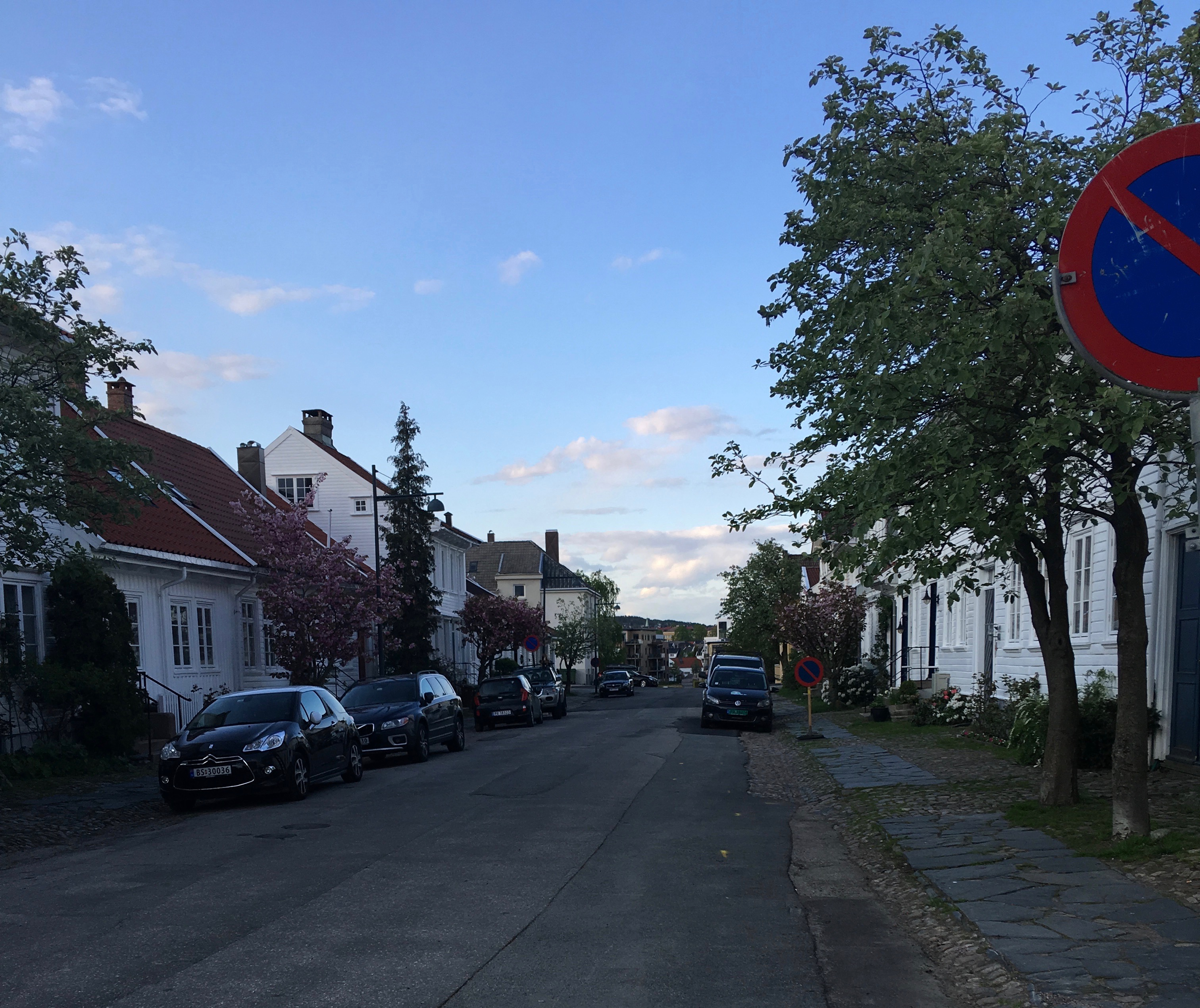
Posebyen with Kronprinsens gate

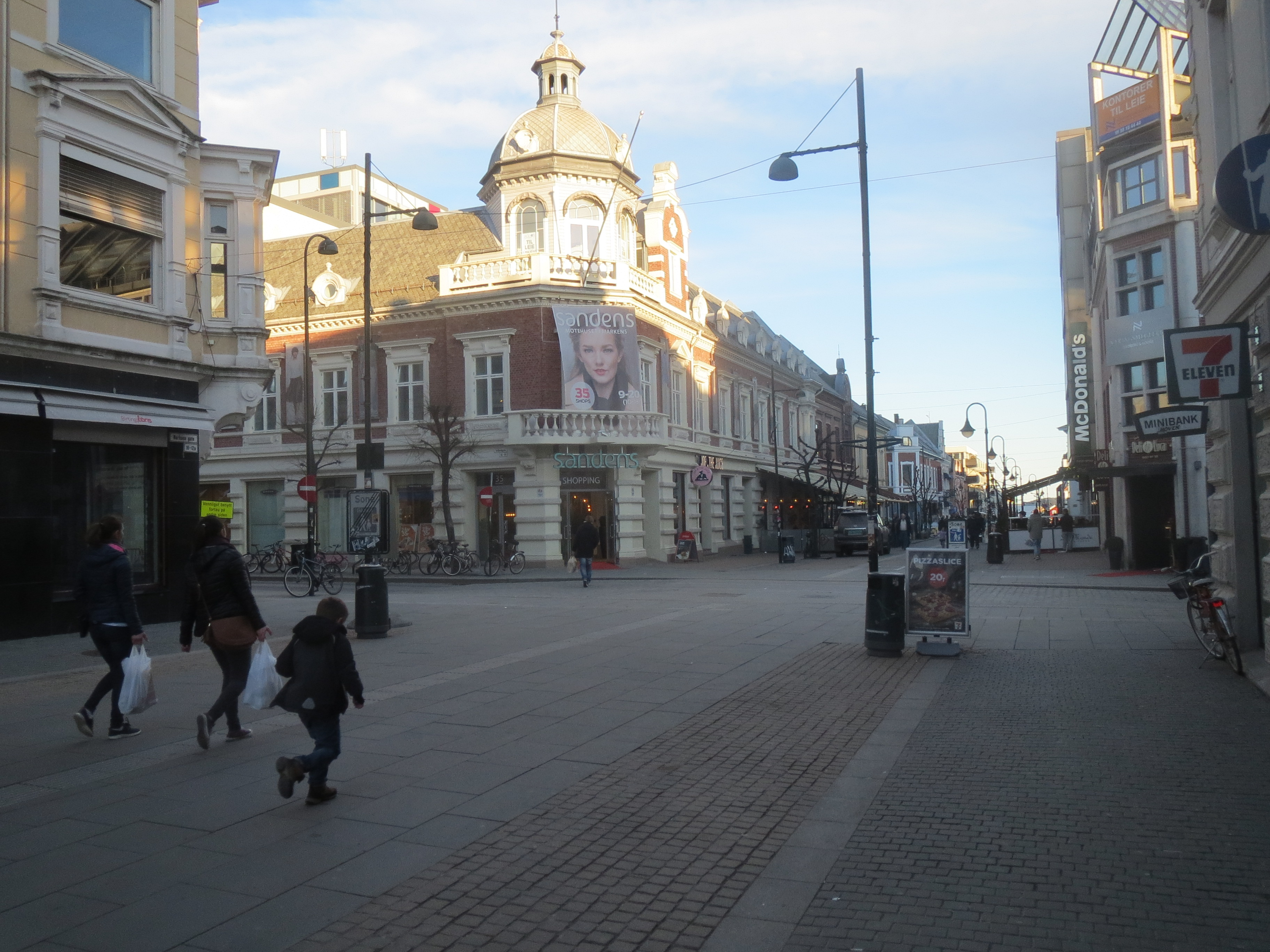
Sandens Mall

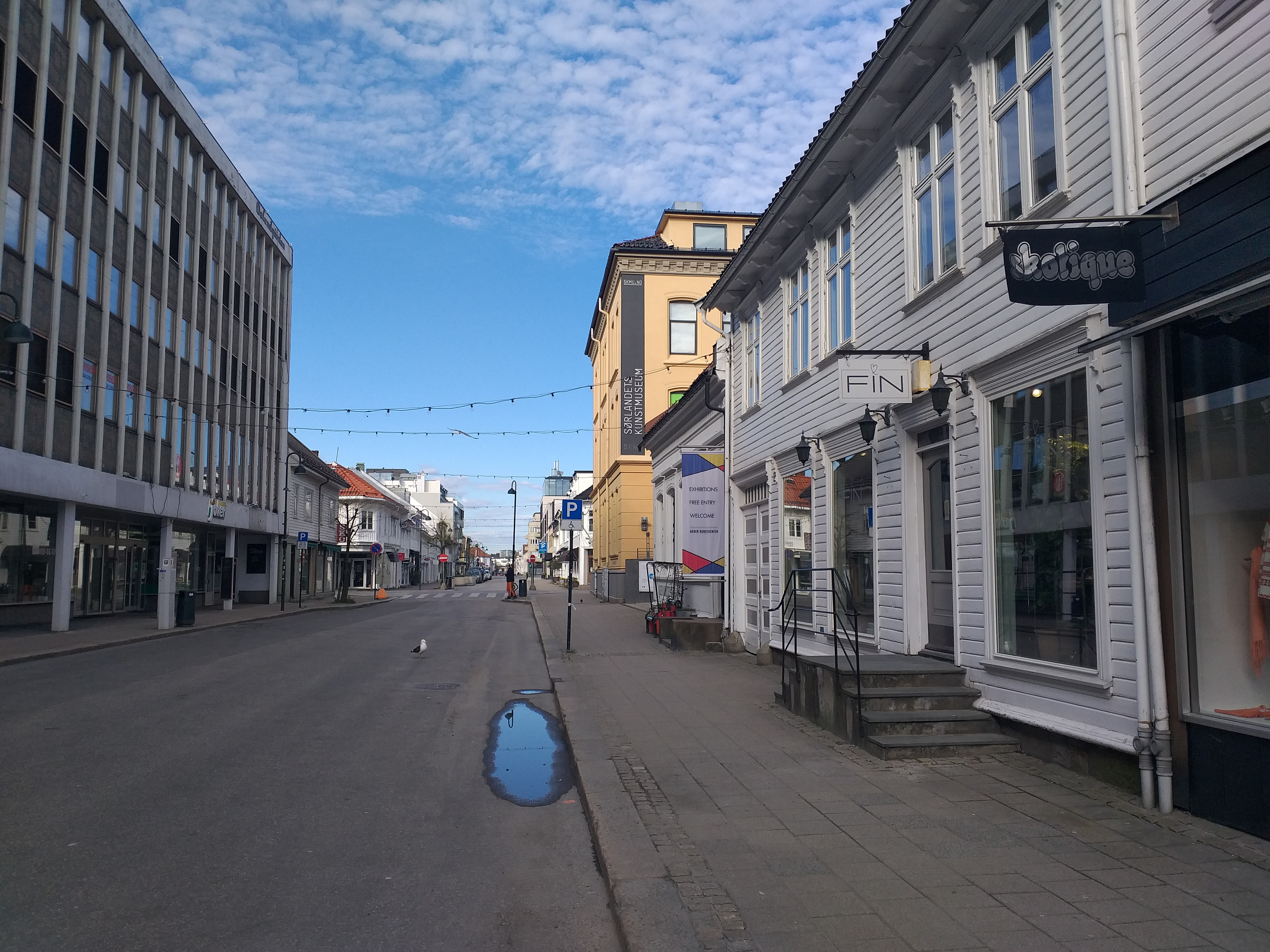
Skippergata

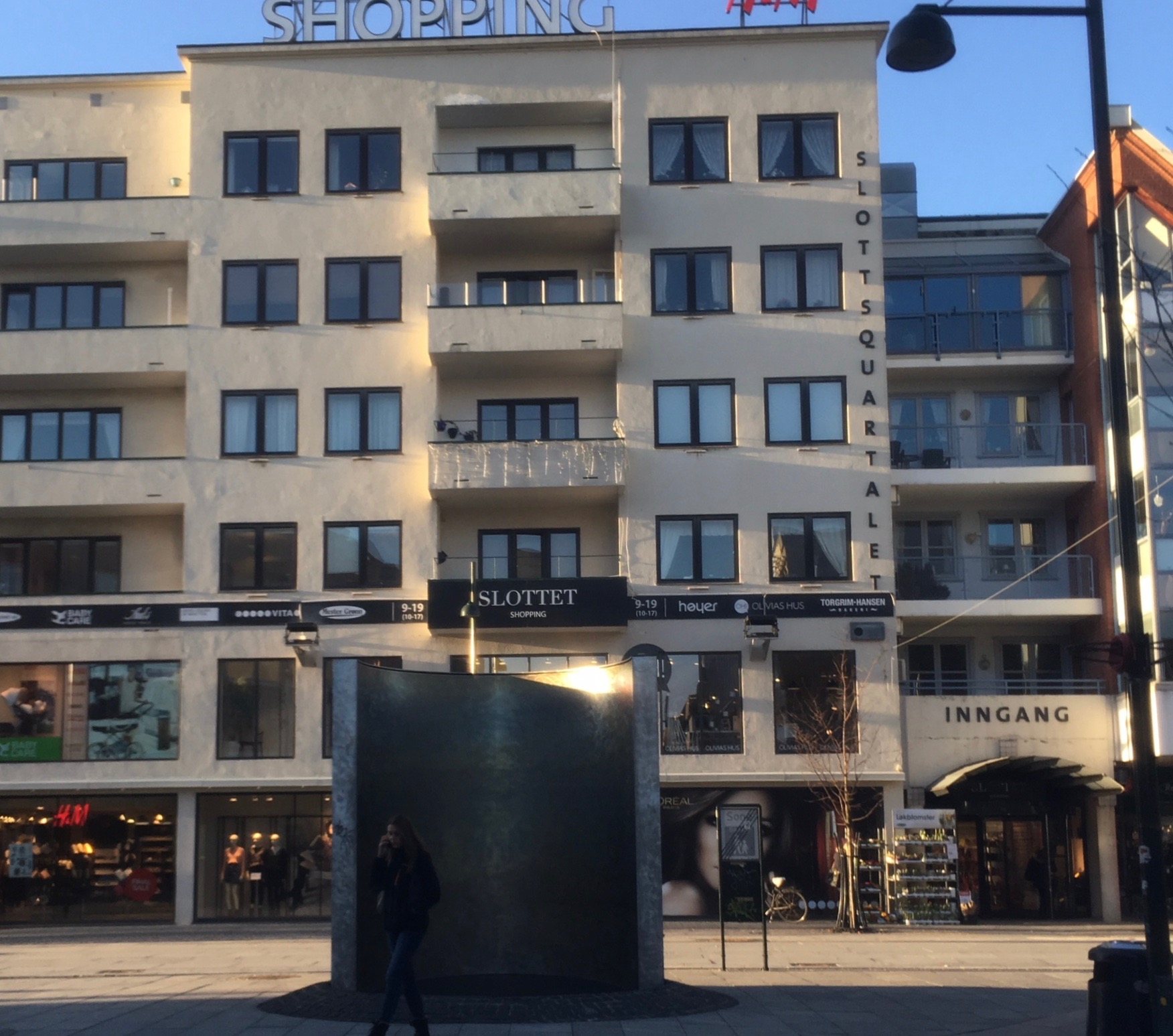
Slottet Mall

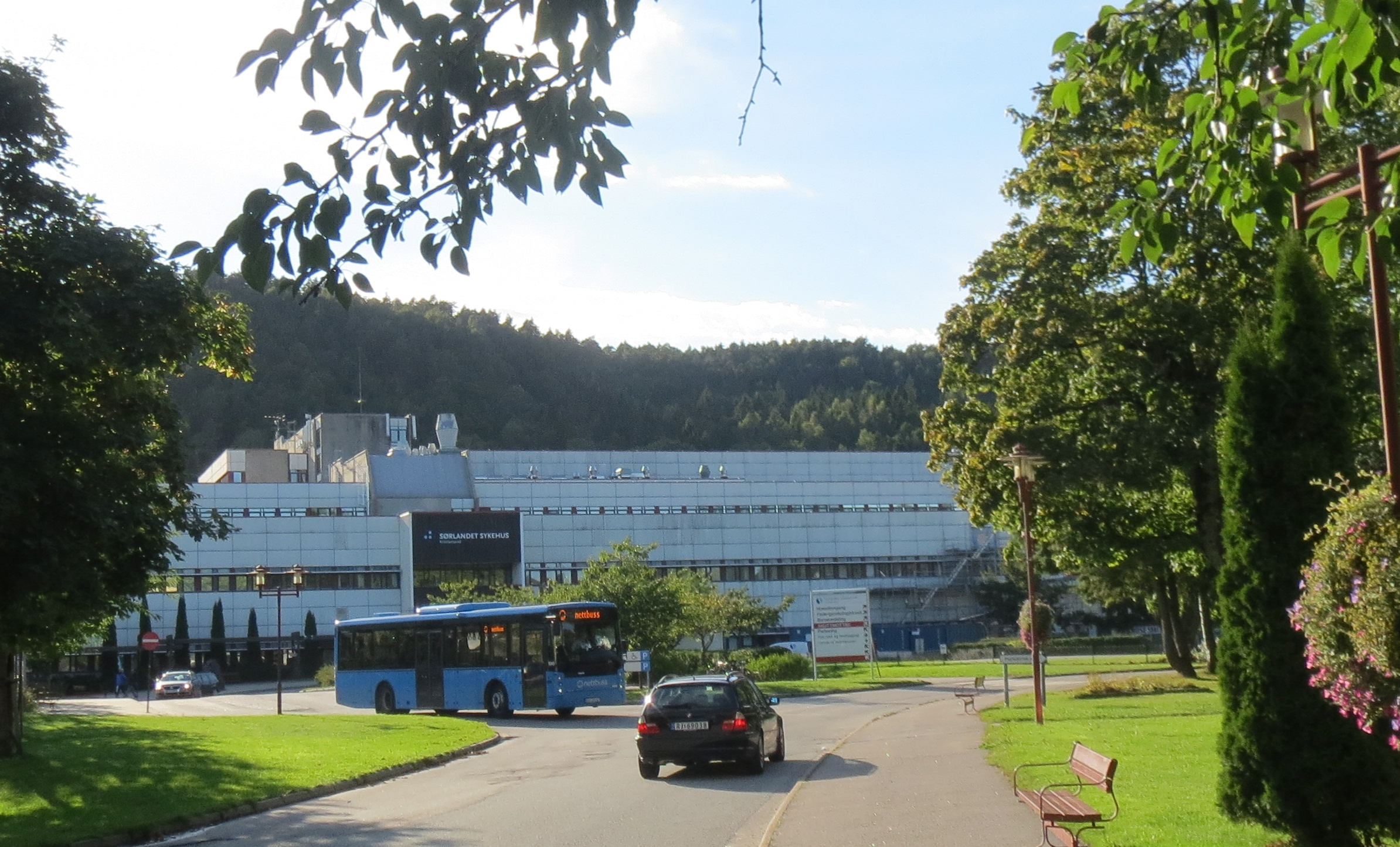
Sørlandet Hospital Kristiansand

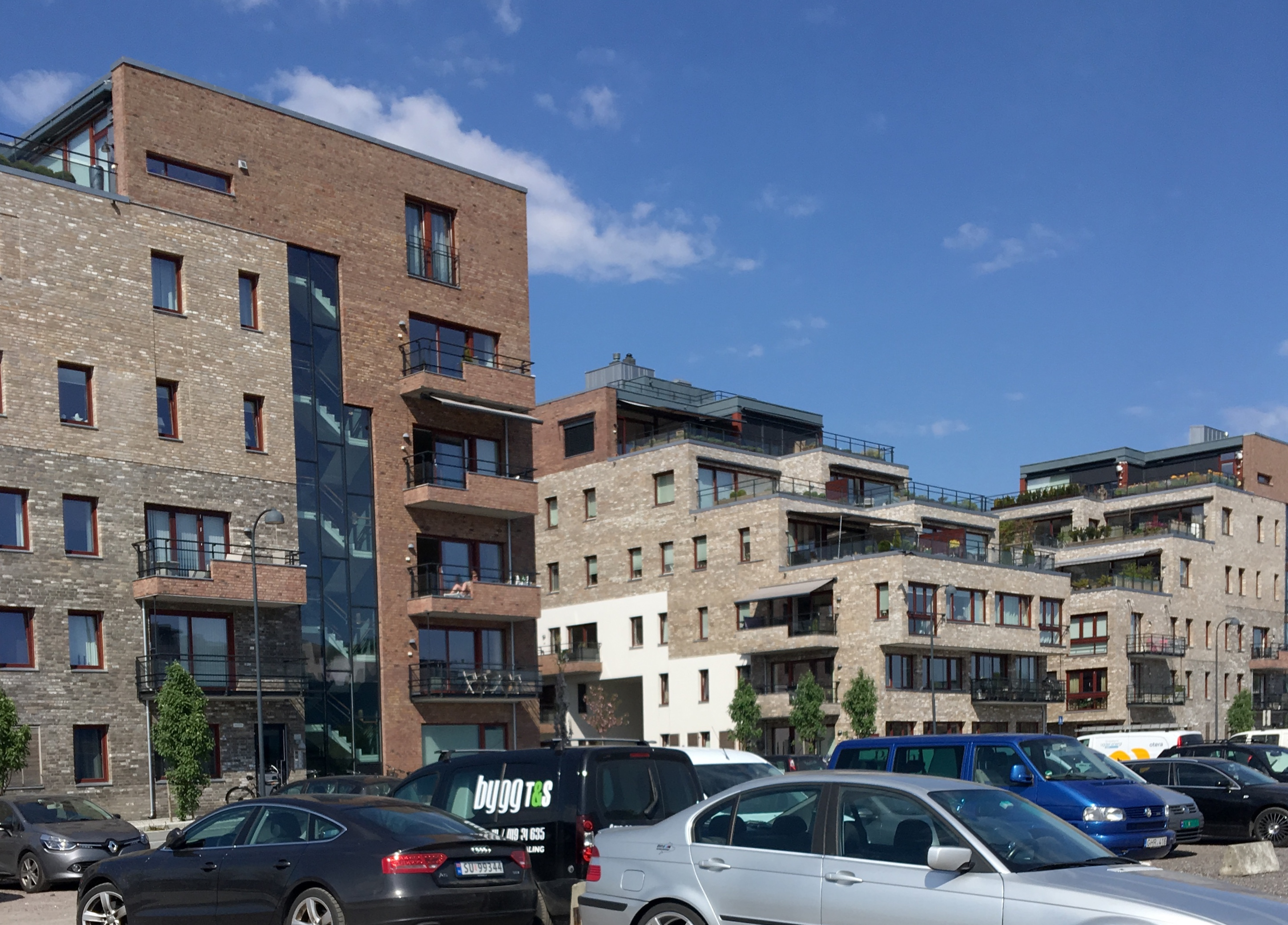
Tangen

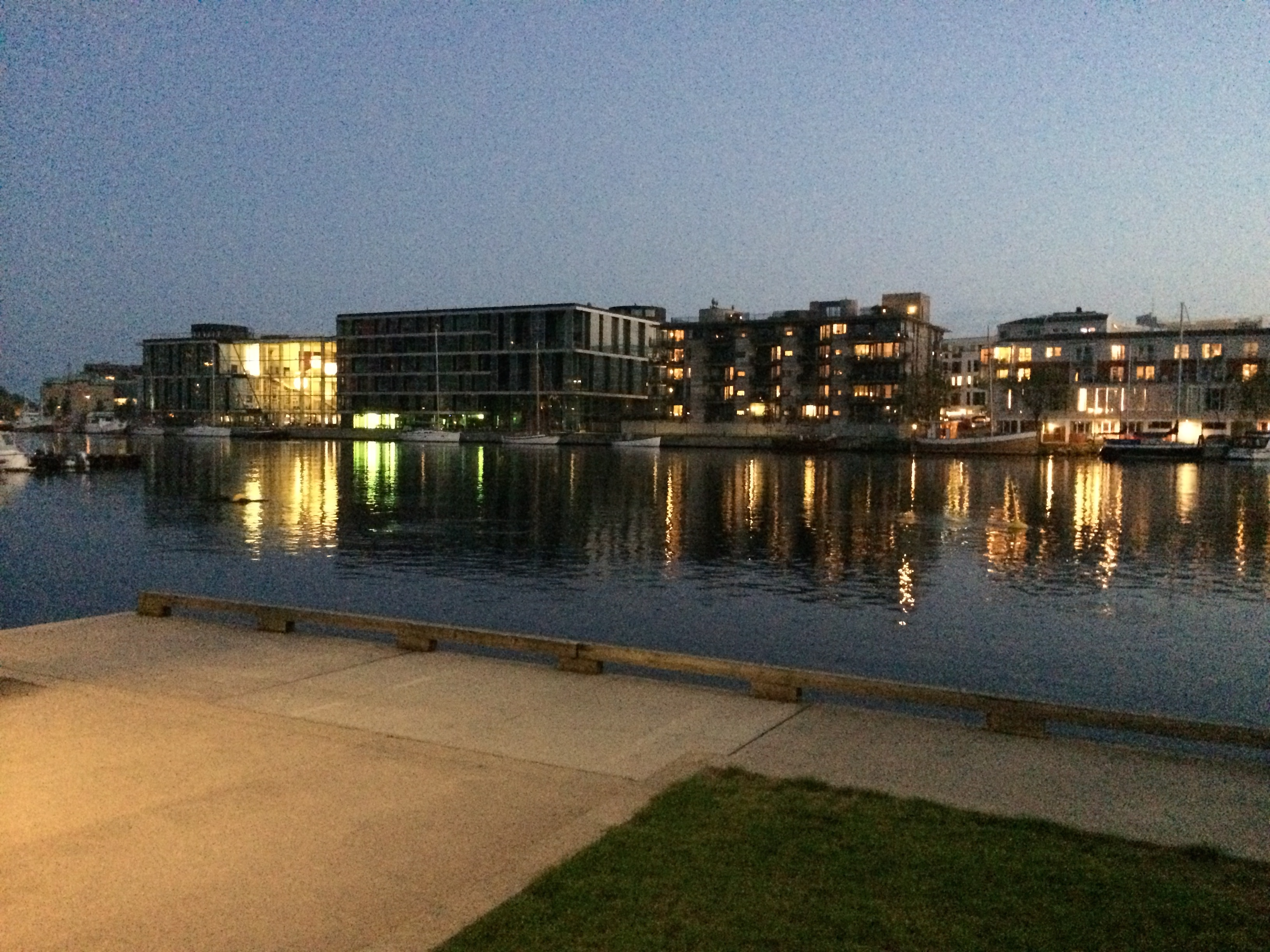
Tangen seen from Høivold brygge

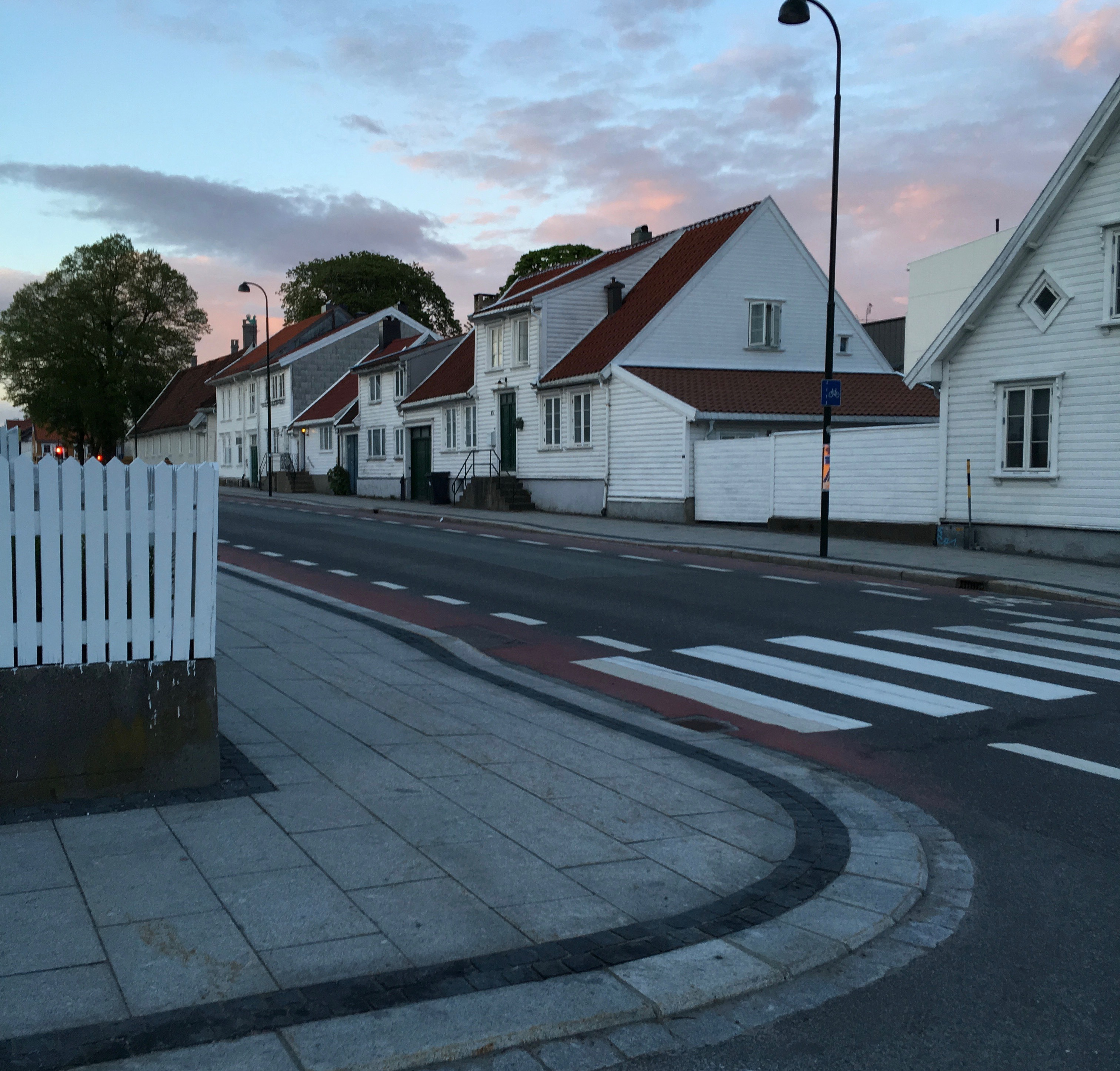
Tordenskjoldsgate with Nybyen

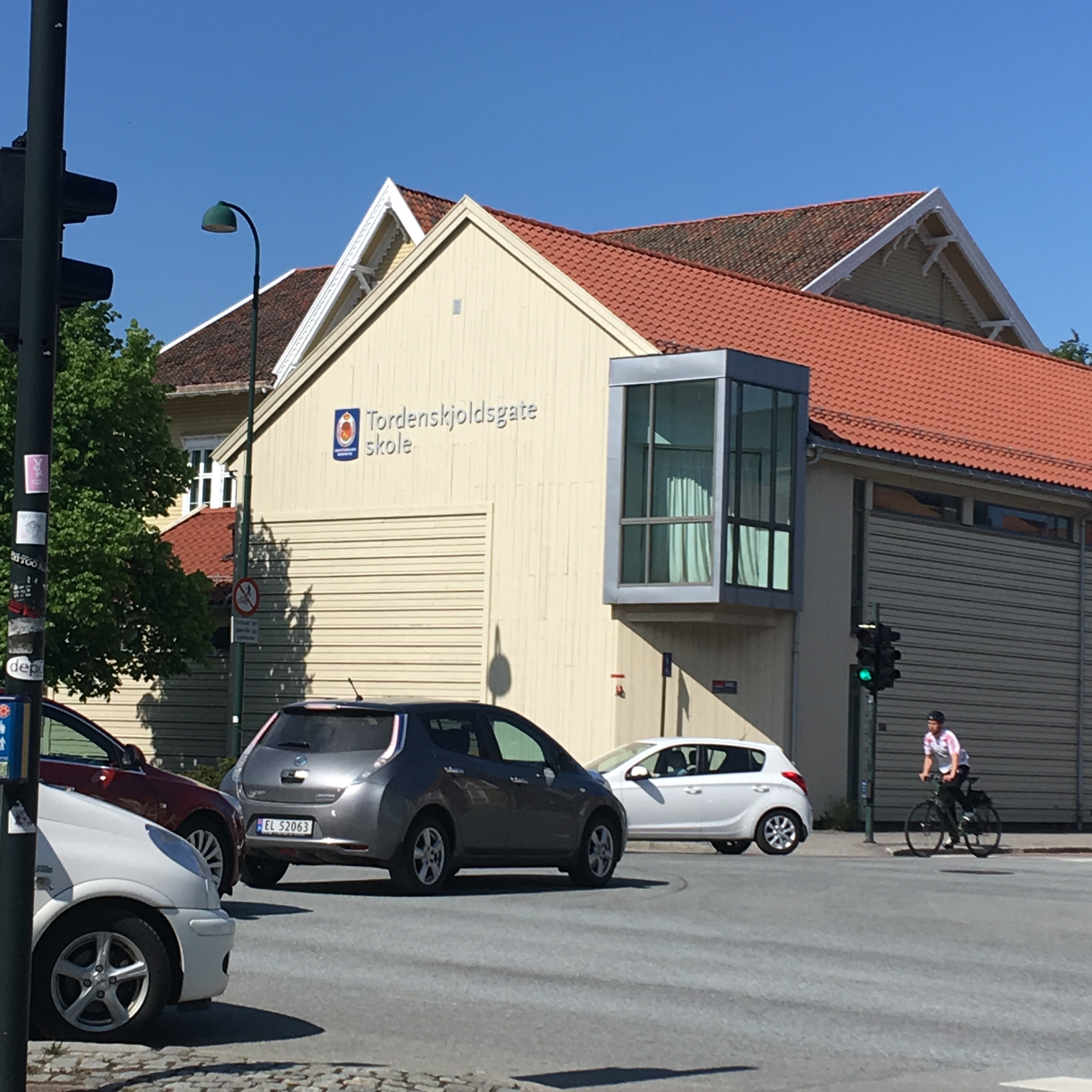
Tordenskjoldsgate Elementary School

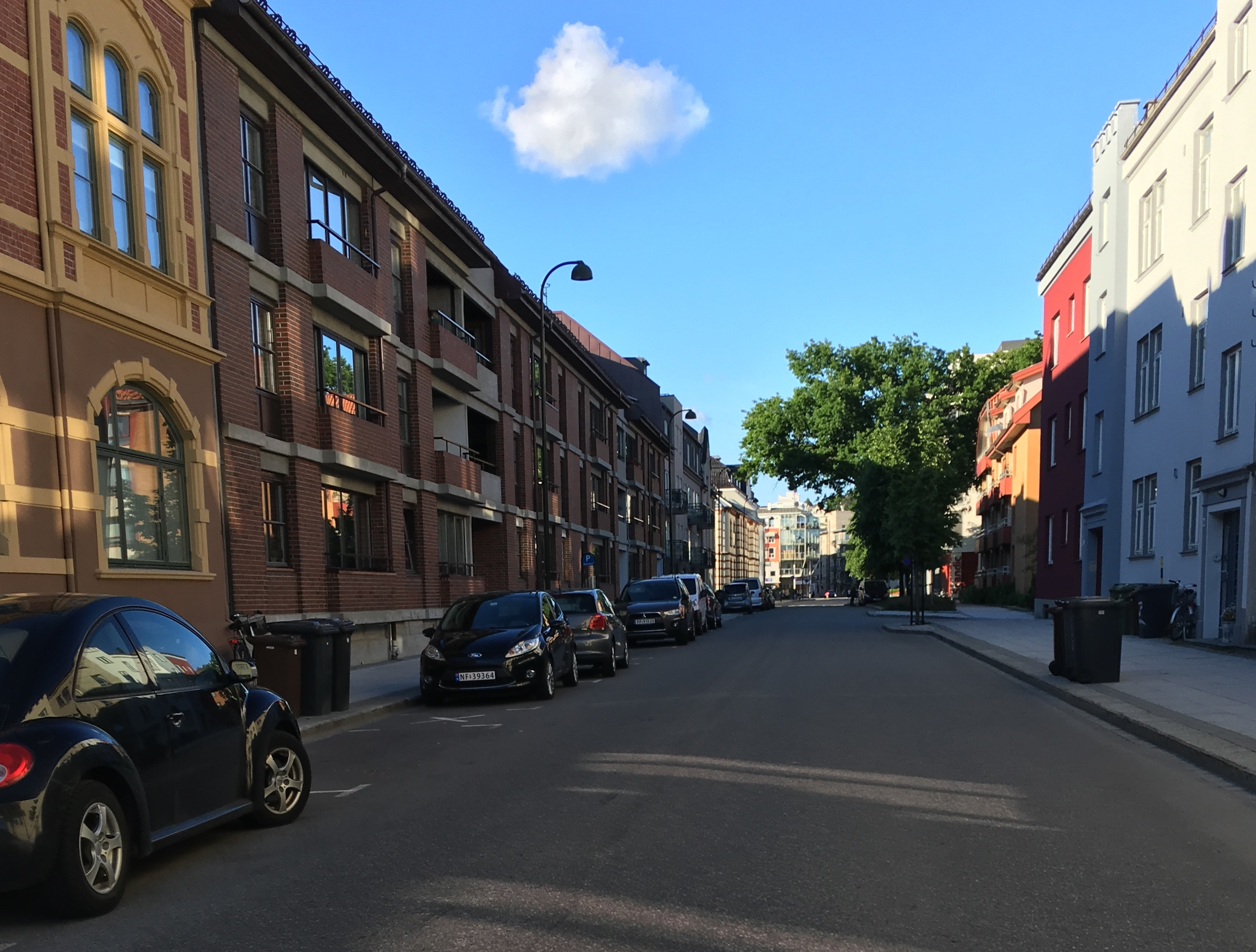
Østre Strandgate

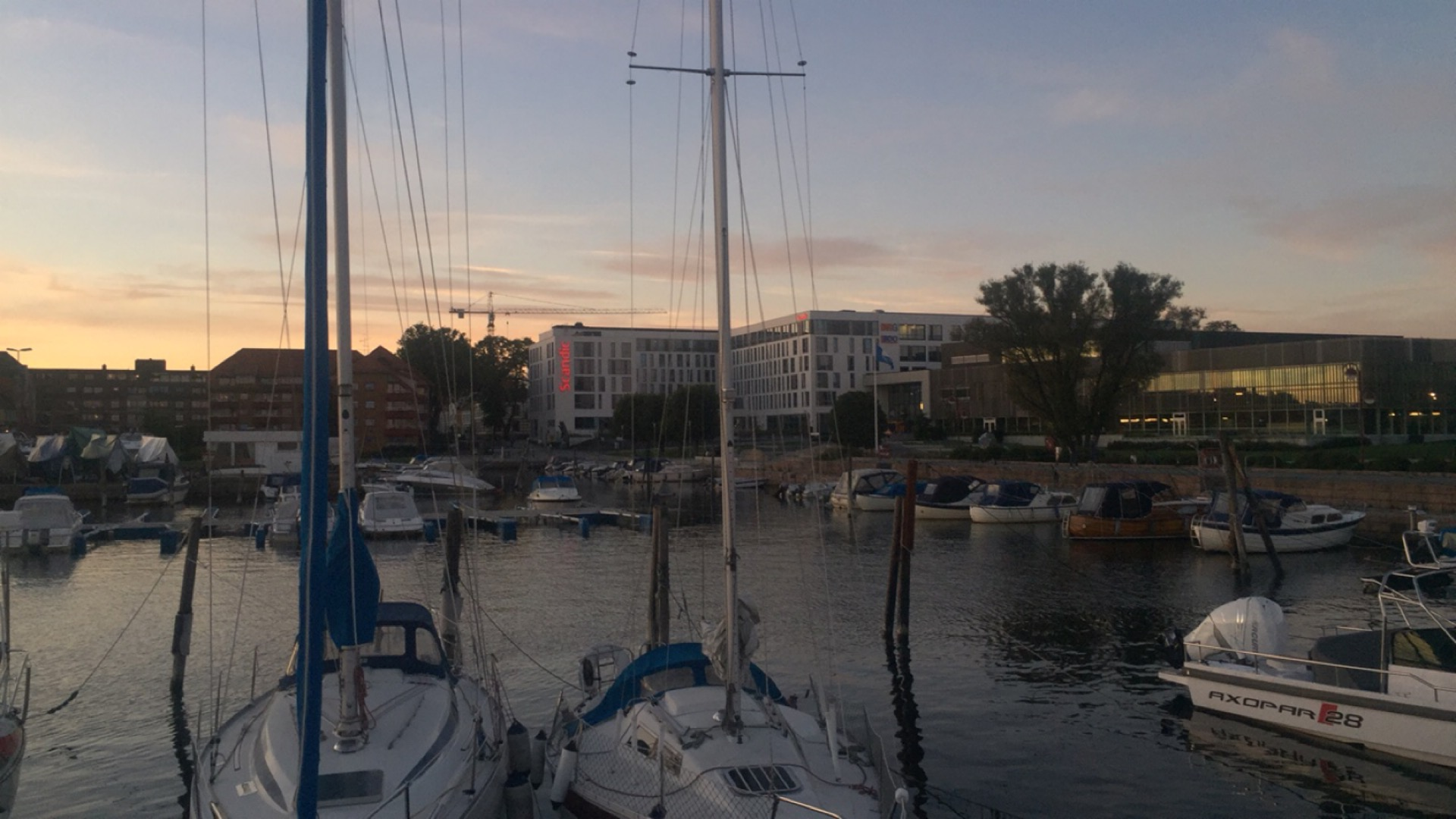
The city public harbour

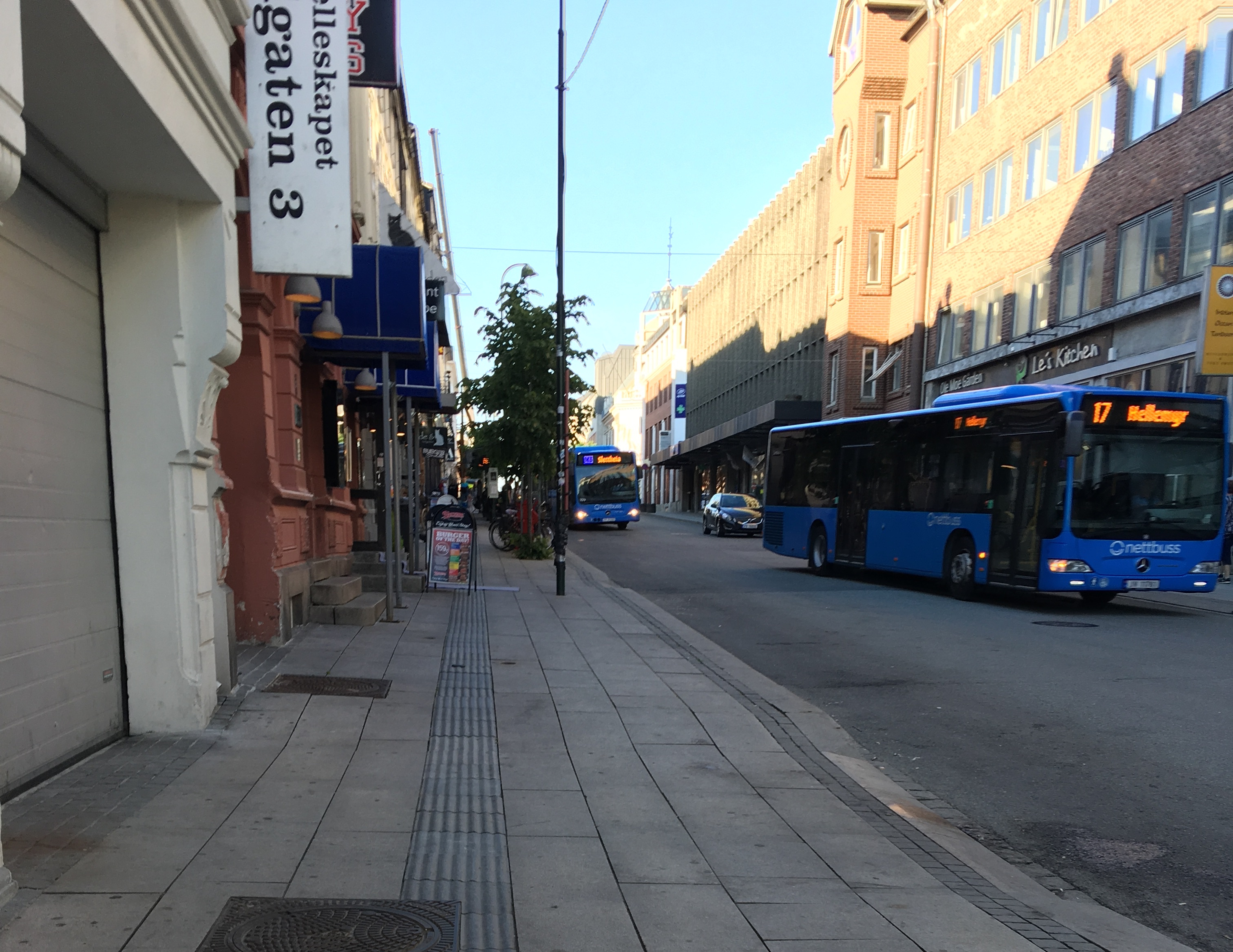
Tollbodgata

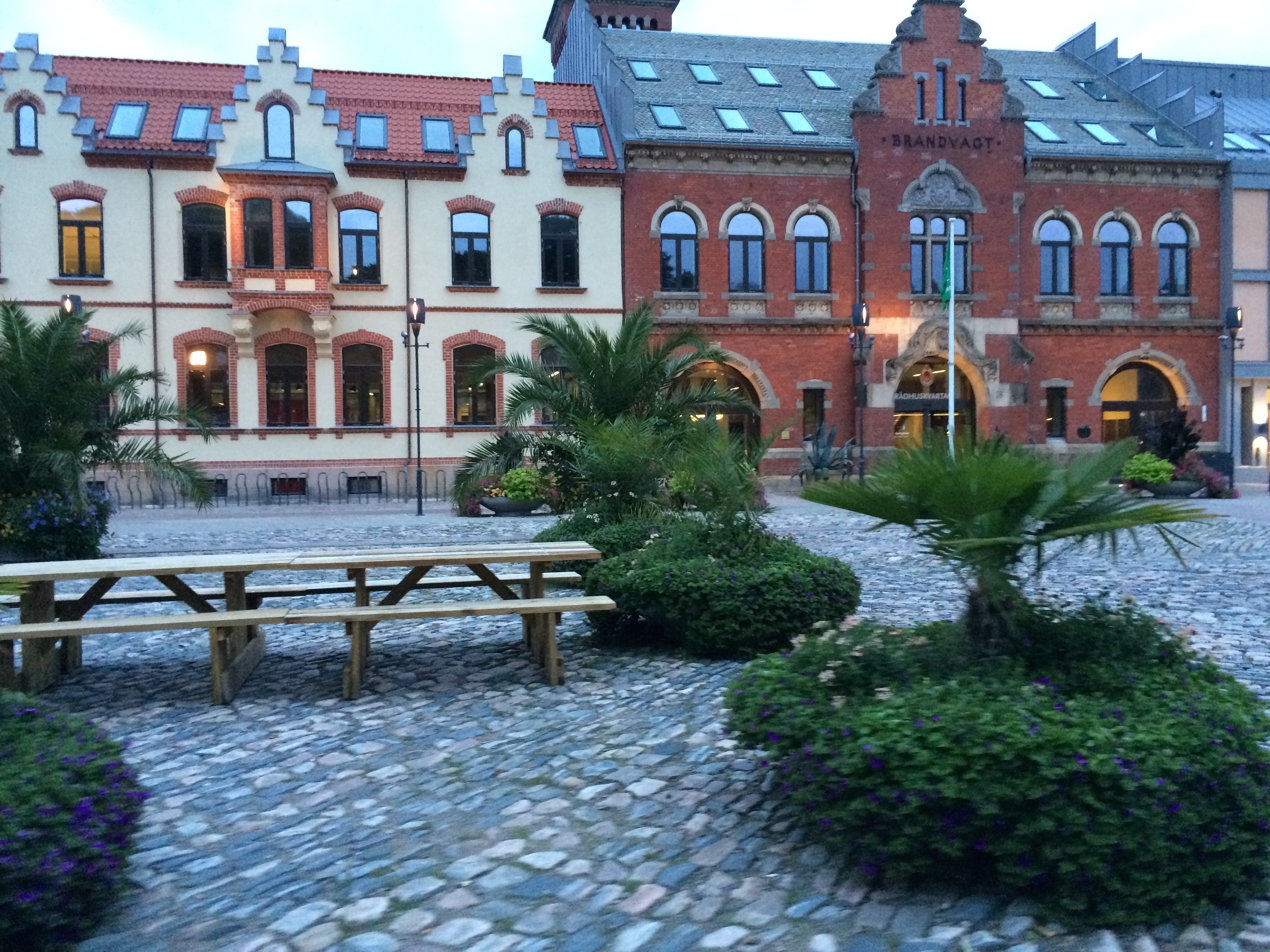
Torvet, the main square

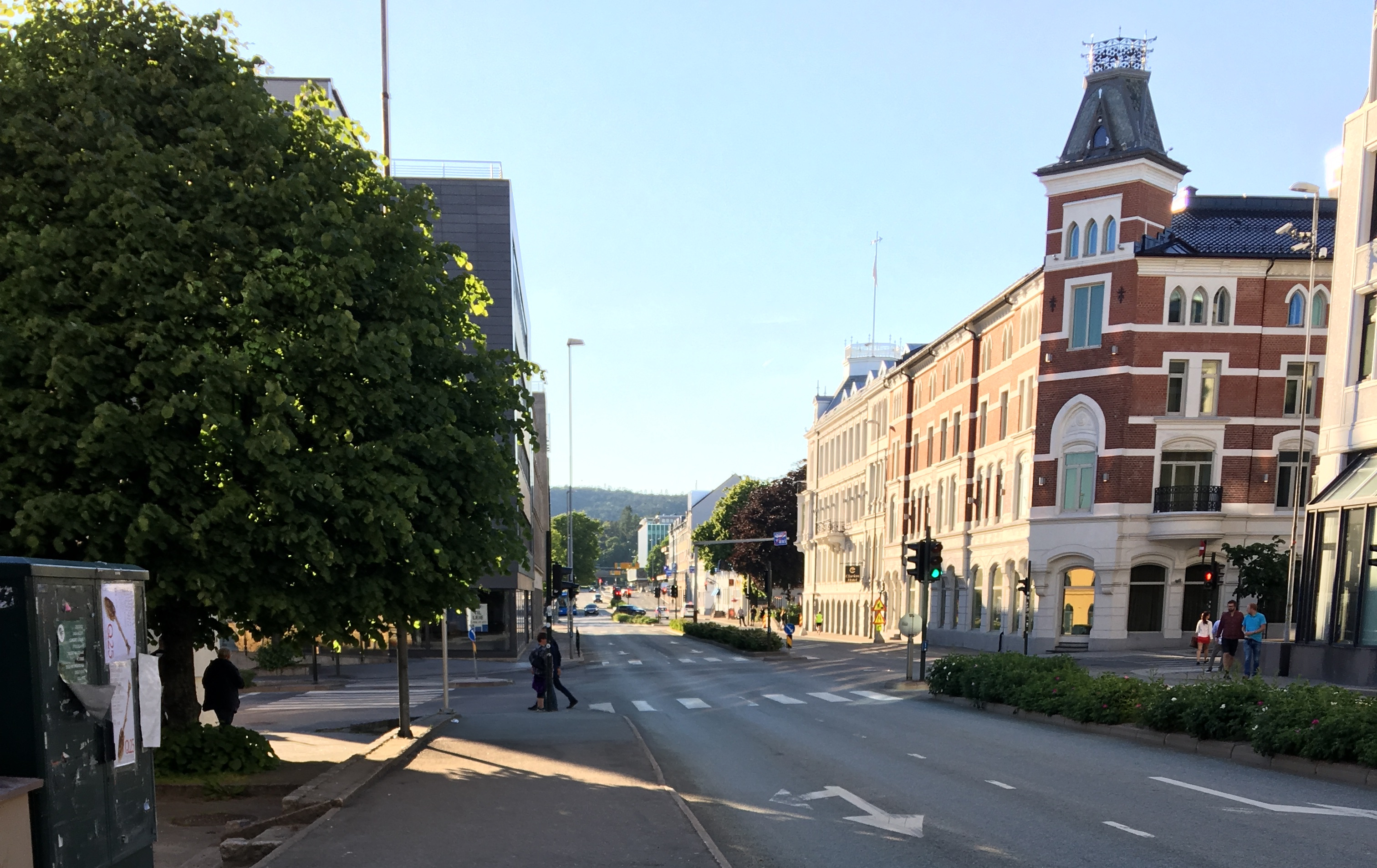
Vestre Strandgate

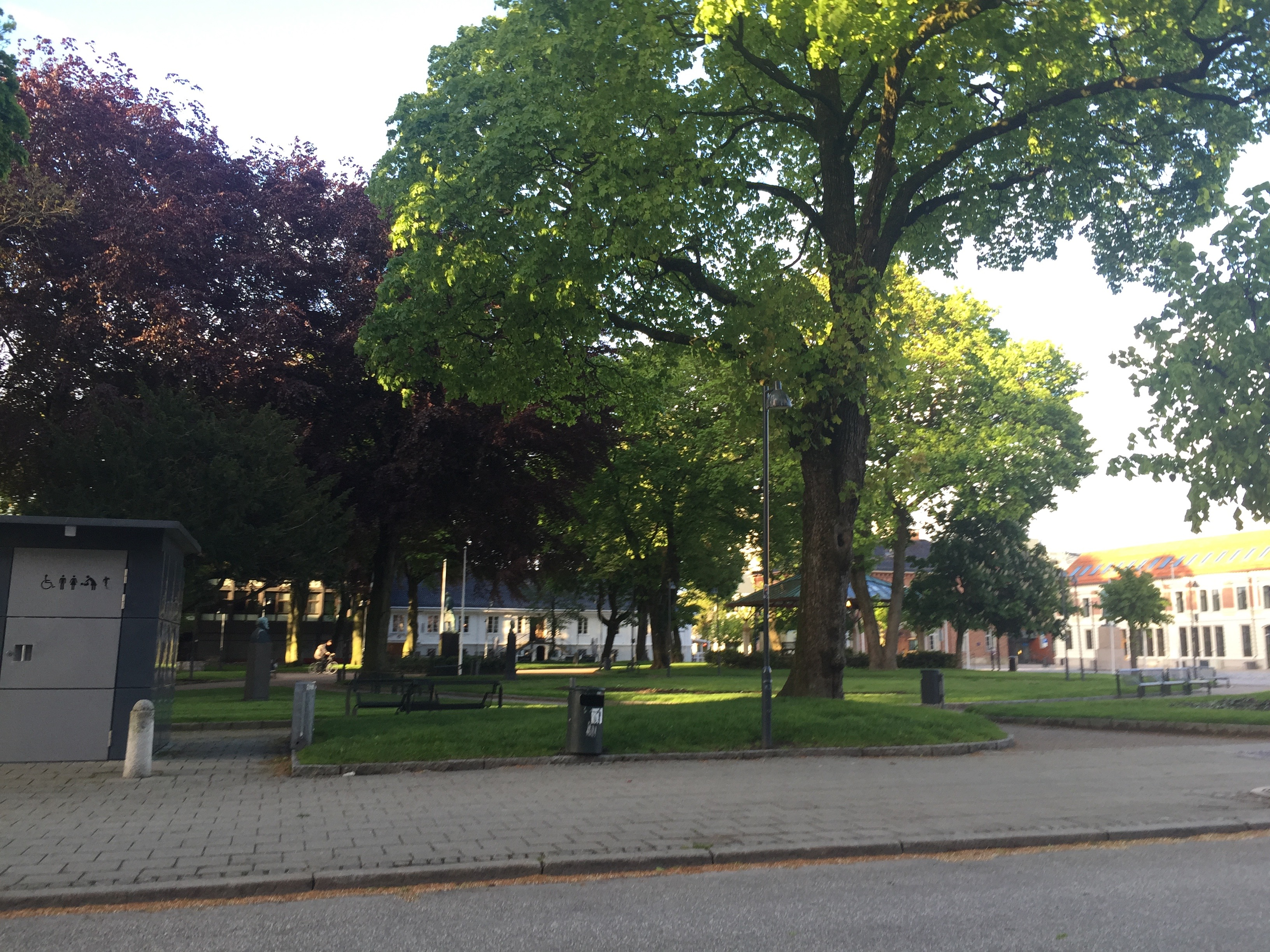
Wergelandsparken
