= Lagmannsholmen =

Former island in Kristiansand, Norway

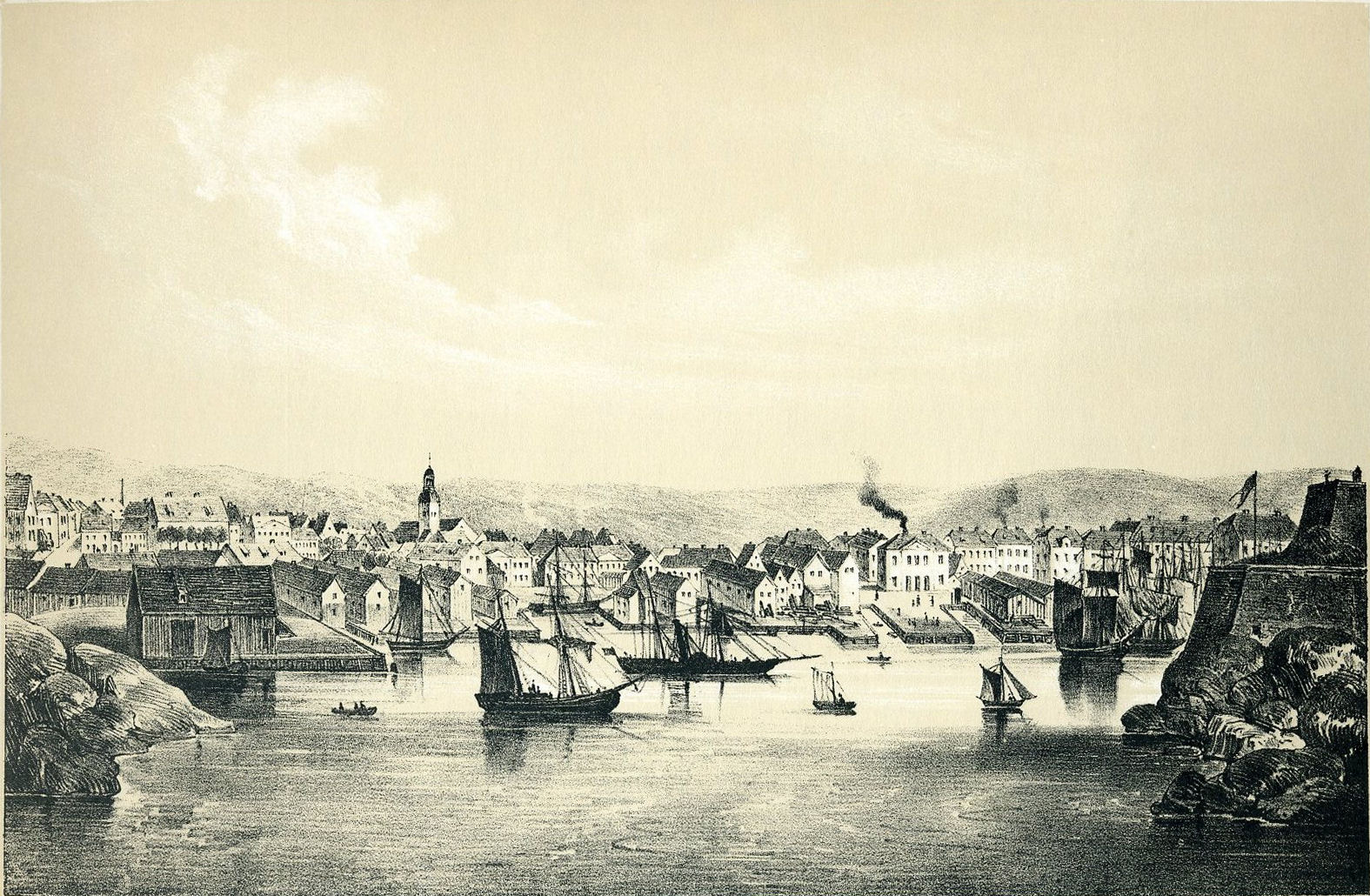
- View of the western port of Christianssand (1848) with the walls of the fortress at Lagmannshomen to the right
- Interactive map of the island

Geography
- Location: Agder, Norway
- Coordinates: 58.1399°N 07.9917°E
- Length: 300 m (1000 ft)
- Width: 125 m (410 ft)

Administration
- Norway
- County: Agder
- Municipality: Kristiansand Municipality

Lagmannsholmen is a former island in Kristiansand Municipality in Agder county, Norway. It sits at the entrance to the western part of the harbor of the town of Kristiansand, just northwest of the island of Odderøya.

Starting in 1686, the island was the site of the fleet station for the Danish-Norwegian galley fleet (Skjærbåt). Between the years 1750–1758, construction was completed for a new headquarters and main station for the navy at Fredriksvern naval station and shipyard at Stavern in Vestfold county.

During the 1960s and 1970s, the island was expanded and ultimately connected to the mainland in order to expand the western harbor in the port of Kristiansand. Lagmannsholmen is now part of the mainland. It forms a part of Kristiansand's container port and is connected to the current Kristiansand Fish Wharf (Fiskebrygga). Most of the former islet consists today of large warehouses and a concrete grain silo. There are few buildings dating from the former fortifications.

In May 2017 a new dock for cruise ships was put into operation at Lagmannsholmen.

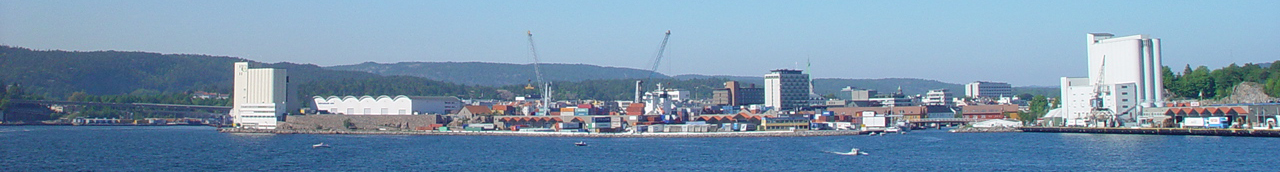
Western port of Kristiansand, Silokaia at Odderøya with grain silos to the right, Lagmannsholmen with container port and feed silos left

== Related reading ==
- Steen, Sverre (1941). Kristiansands historie 1641–1814. Oslo: Grøndahl.
