= Dvergsøya =

Island in Agder, Norway

Dvergsøya Dvergs-øya (historic)
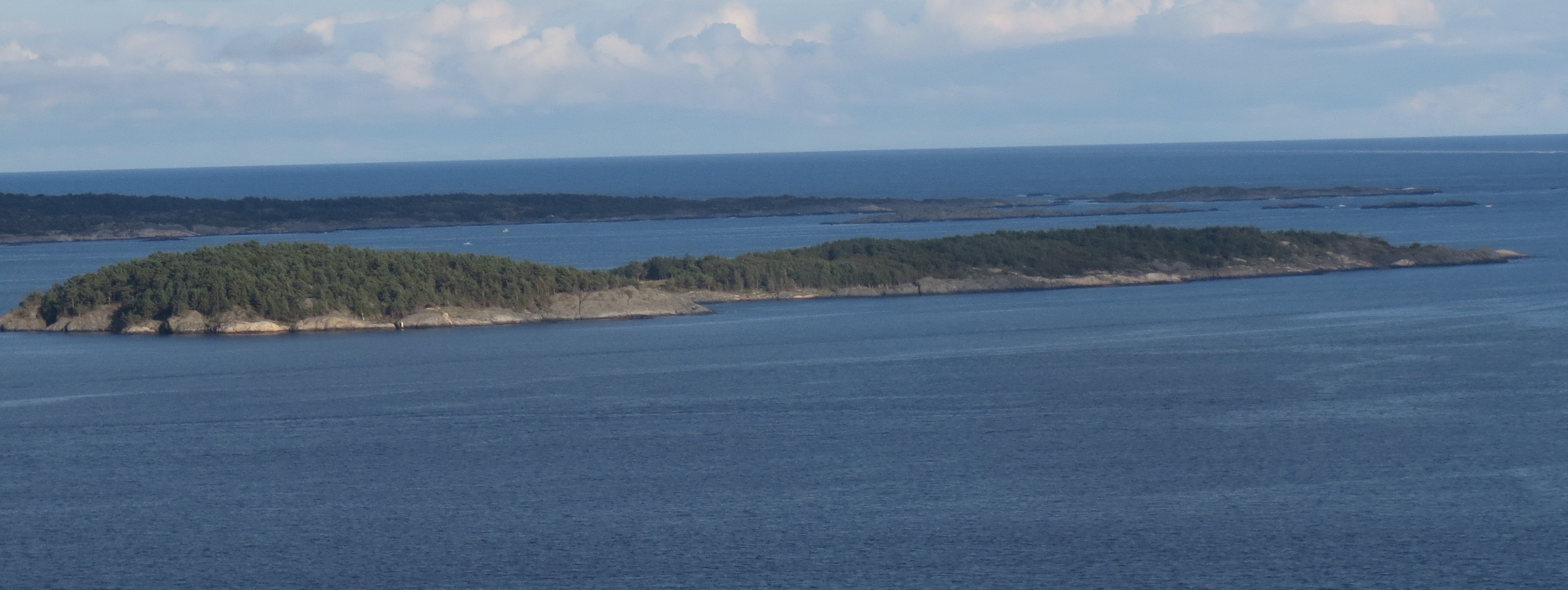
- View of Dvergsøya as seen from Odderøya
- Interactive map of the island

Geography
- Location: Agder, Norway
- Coordinates: 58.10832°N 8.05974°E
- Area: 0.27 km^{2} (0.10 sq mi)
- Length: 1.16 km (0.721 mi)
- Width: 330 m (1080 ft)
- Coastline: 3 km (1.9 mi)
- Highest elevation: 20 m (70 ft)

Administration
- Norway
- County: Agder
- Municipality: Kristiansand Municipality

Dvergsøya is an island in Kristiansand Municipality in Agder county, Norway. The 0.27-square-kilometre (67-acre) island lies in the archipelago in the Kristiansandsfjorden to the southeast of the city of Kristiansand. The island is used as a recreational area and it has wharfs for visiting boats as well as toilet facilities. Dvergsøya is only accessible by boat.

Dvergsøya is best known as the island where King Haakon VIII and Queen Mette-Marit of Norway spend their annual summer vacation with their children. However, the island's fairly dramatic history is less known.

== History ==
Dvergsøya was originally a smallholding under the mainland farm Dvergsnes. The island was historically used for farming.

=== Witch ===
Maren was a smallholders wife from Dvergsøya. She was arrested on 20 April 1670 in connection with the sinking of a ship bound for Jutland. There were several people involved in this case who were all women. One of Maren's "accomplices" explained in court what should have happened. They had flown through the air down to the ship. There they met the devil, disguised as a priest. It was Maren who ensured that the boat sank. Maren denied the story, and was therefore doomed to undergo torture. Under torture, she confirmed the story and was the last witch in Norway to be sentenced to death and burned at the stake. The sentence was executed on 9 September 1670.

=== Burglary, arson and murder ===
More recently, in the 20th century, two wealthy men named Jebsen and Vogt from Kristiansand built country houses (villas) on Dvergsøya. Jebsen's villa was the scene of an infamous crime. On the night of Easter Sunday in 1933, three men broke into Jebsen's villa and then set fire to it afterwards to hide the traces of the burglary. Afterwards, one of the thieves and arsonists tried to break with the other two. As punishment, they killed him by drowning him in a basin and dump him in the Kristiansandsfjorden. Today, the ruins of Jebsen's villa are still visible.

=== World War II ===
The location of Dvergsøya at the entrance to the city of Kristiansand made the island interesting also in a military context. During World War II the German occupants had an anti-aircraft battery to protect the city of Kristiansand. The battery consisted of six fixed anti-aircraft cannons on the southwestern part of the island. Today, the foundations of the cannons are still visible.

=== Royal visits ===
Vogt sold his villa. For many years, it was used as a vacation rental house. Crown Princess Mette-Marit is originally from the nearby city of Kristiansand and over the years, her family has enjoyed spending their summer vacations at Vogt's villa which they have rented. Vogt's villa was designed by Arnstein Arneberg, the same architect that designed the royal residence at Skaugum. In 2009, a rental contract was signed by the royal couple with Kristiansand Municipality which owns the property. Since then, a protective fence was built around the recreational area which caused a political debate and protests.

== See also ==
- List of islands of Norway
