= Odderøya Lighthouse =

Coastal lighthouse in Kristiansand, Norway

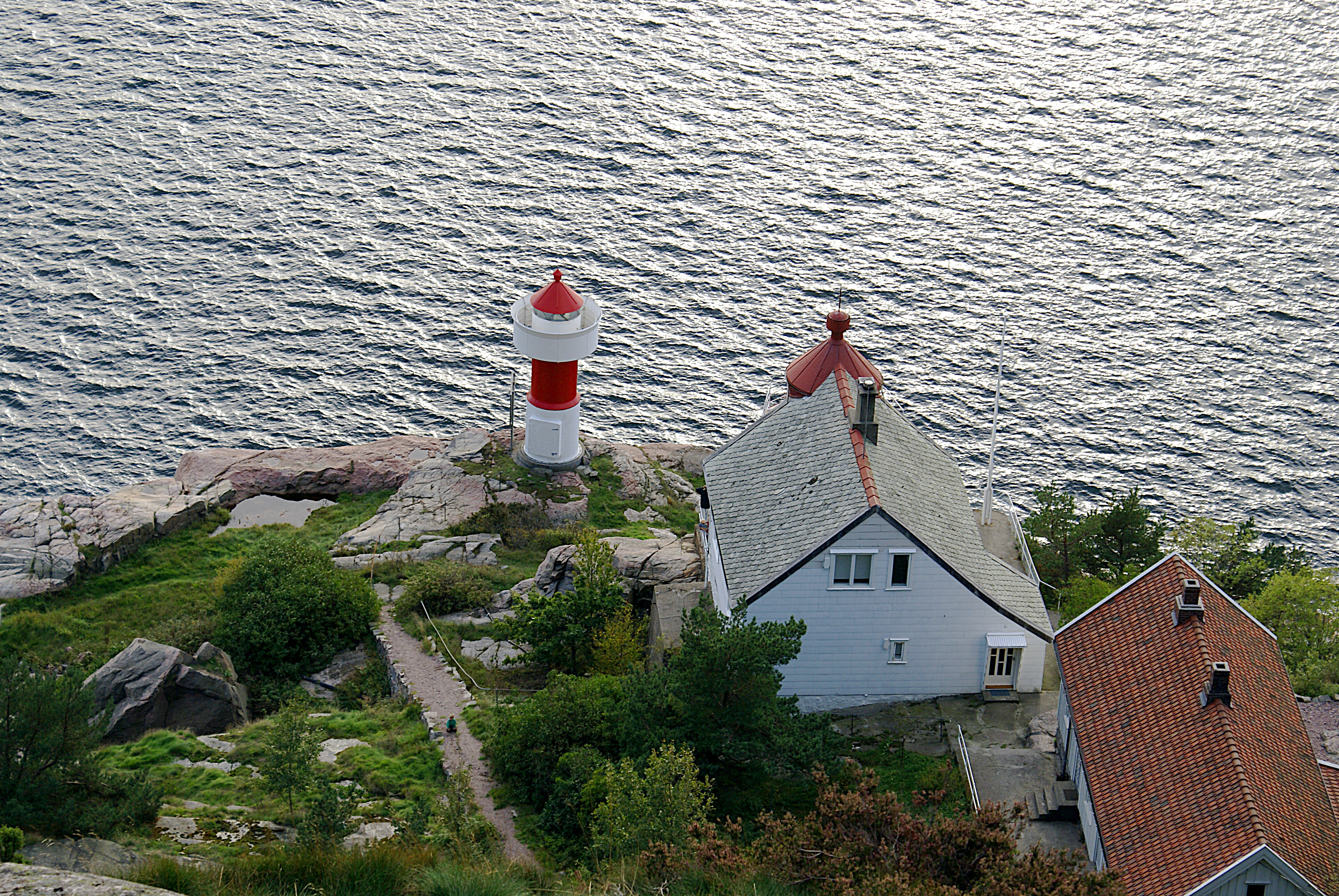
- Location: Odderøya, Kristiansand, Norway
- Coordinates: 58°07′53″N 8°00′08″E

Tower
- Constructed: 1874
- Height: 8.7 m (29 ft)
- Heritage: cultural property

Light
- Deactivated: 1984
- Focal height: 21.2 m (70 ft)
- Current light
- Construction: concrete
- Height: 8.7 m (29 ft)
- Shape: cylinder
- Markings: Red and white
- First lit: 1984
- Focal height: 12.5 m (41 ft)
- Intensity: 13,300 candela
- Range: 6.1 nmi (11.3 km; 7.0 mi)
- Characteristic: Oc(2) WRG 8s

Odderøya Lighthouse (Norwegian: Odderøya fyr) is a coastal lighthouse located on the southwestern coast of the island of Odderøya in Kristiansand Municipality in Agder county, Norway. The lighthouse was first built in 1832. The lighouse was replaced in 1874. That second lighthouse was deactivated in 1984 and a new, automated lighthouse was built adjacent to the historic one, which is still standing. The second Odderøya Lighthouse is listed and protected by law by the Norwegian Directorate for Cultural Heritage.

== Present lighthouse ==
The 8.7-metre (29 ft) tall light tower was built in 1984 to replace the previous lighthouse which is still standing just a short distance to the east. The concrete, cylindrical tower is white with a red stripe around it and a red roof. The tower emits a white, red, or green light (depending on direction) at an elevation of 12.5 metres (41 ft) above sea level. The occulting light occurs twice every eight seconds. The light can be seen for up to 6.1 nmi (11.3 km; 7.0 mi).

The lighthouse is open to visitors on weekends from mid June to mid August and only Sundays from the middle of August and throughout October. Then you can buy coffee, muffins and soup.

== Historic lighthouse ==
The historic lighthouse is located right next to the present active lighthouse. The historic one was built in 1874, replacing the 1832 lighthouse. This historic lighthouse has been inactive since 1984. The 8-metre (26 ft) tall concrete, cylindrical tower is white with a red roof and it is attached to a 1 1/2-story lighthouse keeper's house. A fog bell is attached to the front of the tower. The building is now owned by the city of Kristiansand.

== See also ==
- Lighthouses in Norway
- List of lighthouses in Norway
