= Church City Mission =

Norwegian social foundation

Church City Mission (Norwegian: Kirkens Bymisjon) is a diaconal foundation in Norway doing social work within alcohol care, elderly care, child welfare, mental health care and among prostitutes - as well as religious activities with pastoral care, preaching and church work.

Church City Mission was founded on January 22, 1855 by Professor Gisle Johnson under the name Christiania Inner Mission Society (Nor: Christiania Indremissionsforening), later Oslo Inner Mission (Oslo Indremisjon). On a national basis the city mission foundations totaling approximately 2000 employees with professional skills. Around 4000 volunteers are also related to the work. Church City Mission operates about 70 large and small institutions and businesses. The main foundation is in Oslo with about 1160 employees. Church City Mission has centers in the larger Norwegian cities, such as Oslo, Tromsø, Bodø, Trondheim, Ålesund, Bergen, Stavanger, Haugesund, Lillehammer, Tønsberg, Fredrikstad, Drammen, Kristiansand and Arendal.

Church City Mission also runs Project 24:7, a health and welfare service open 24/7/365.

General director is Adelheid Firing Hvambsal.
