= Fiskebrygga, Kristiansand =

Fish market and tourist destination in Norway

Coordinates: 58°08′27″N 7°59′45″E

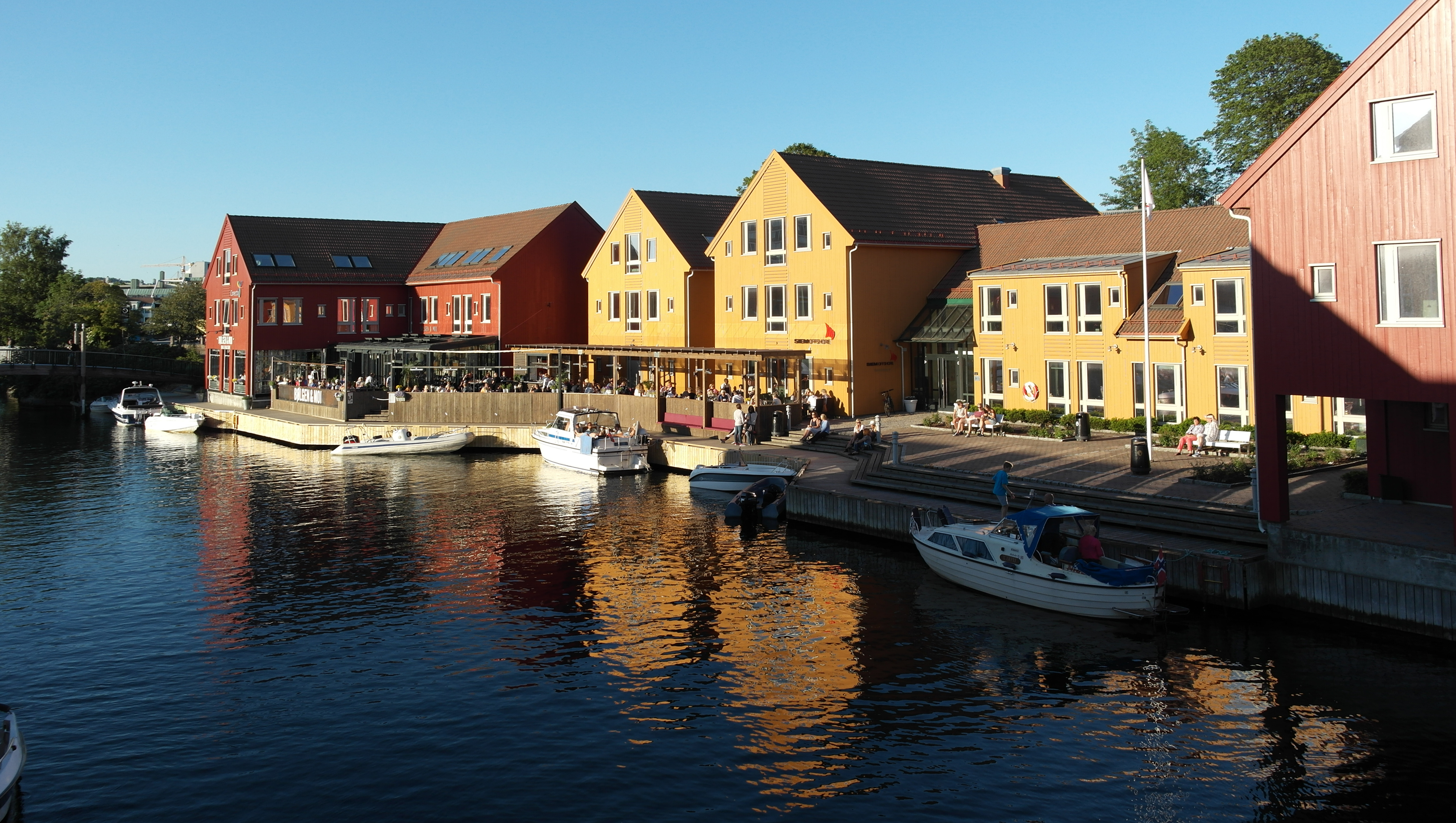
Fiskebrygga

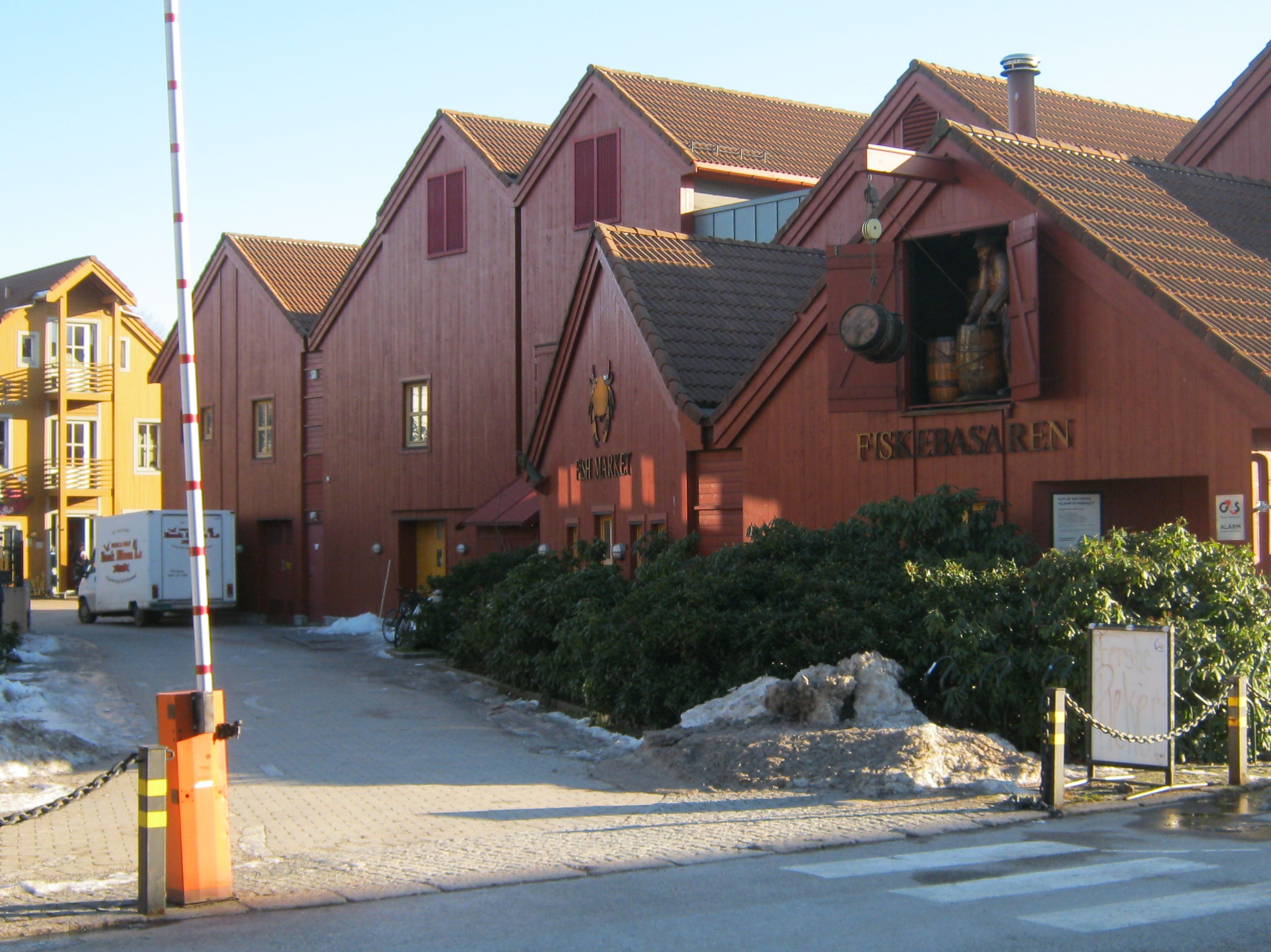
Entrance to the Fish Market at Fiskebrygga

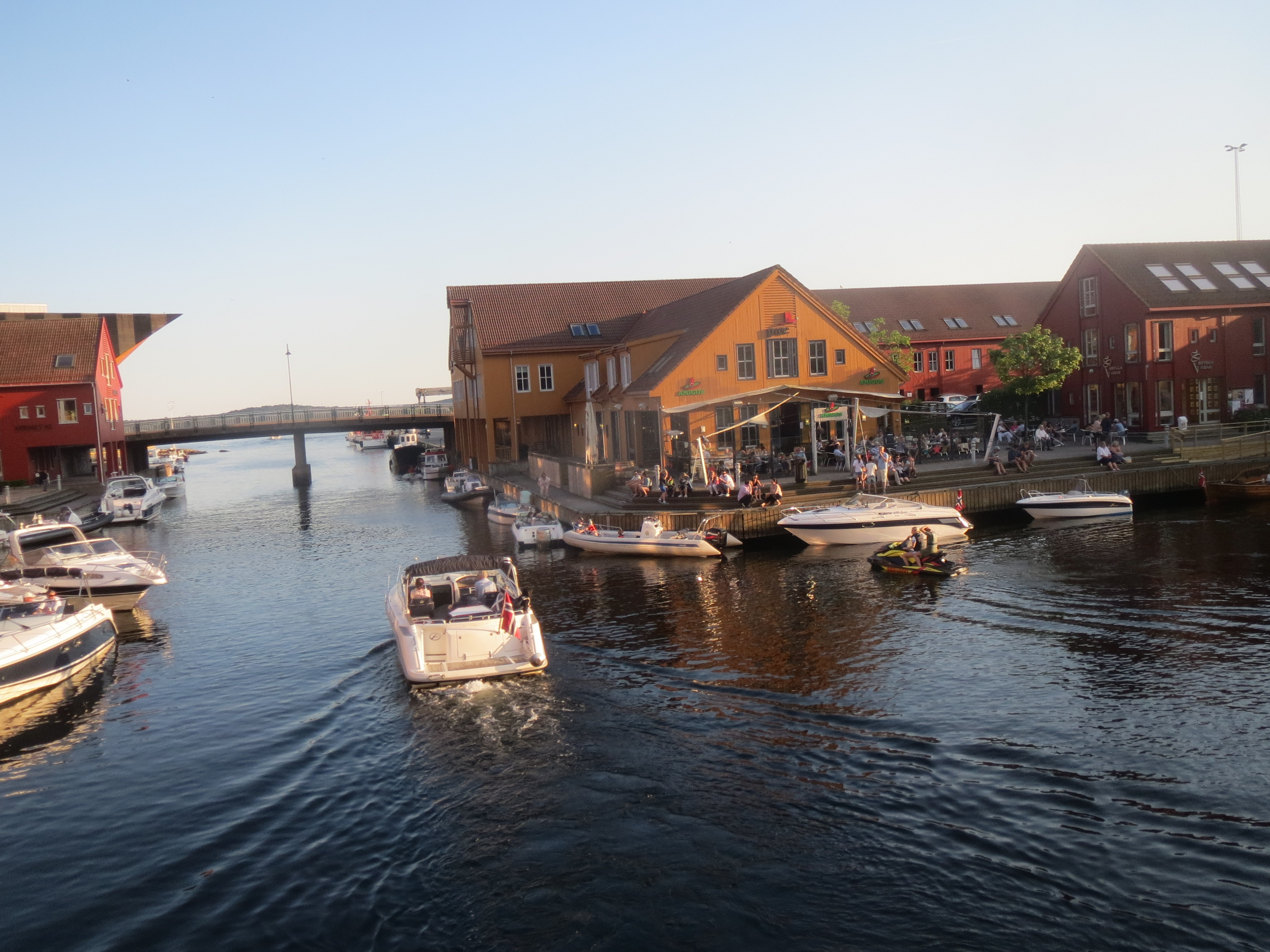
The Gravane Canal

Fiskebrygga (English: The Fish Wharf) is a former fish landing in the city of Kristiansand in Agder county, Norway. The buildings have been redeveloped as a restaurant, shopping area, and tourist destination.

The former fish landing extends along both sides of Gravane Canal, the canal that separates the town centre, Kvadraturen, from the island of Odderøya. It was extensively reconstructed in the 1990s, with wood-fronted buildings in an old-fashioned style similar to the warehouses, painted yellow ochre and red, as well as housing, shops, and a number of restaurants. There are wooden piers on both sides of Gravane Canal, where there is a bustling boat traffic in summer, and bridges over the canal give the area an almost Venetian look. The area has since experienced a renaissance.

The Fish Market at Fiskebrygga is one of the city's tourist attractions, selling all kinds of Norwegian fish and shellfish, including some live. Kirkens Bymisjon (The Church of Norway's City Mission) has its "Wharf Chapel", along with a café and bike repair shop "the pedal" on Fiskebrygga.

== See also ==
- Kilden Performing Arts Centre, nearby theatre and concert hall on Odderøya
- Kristiansand Boardwalk
- Lagmannsholmen
