= Odderøya =

Island in Agder, Norway

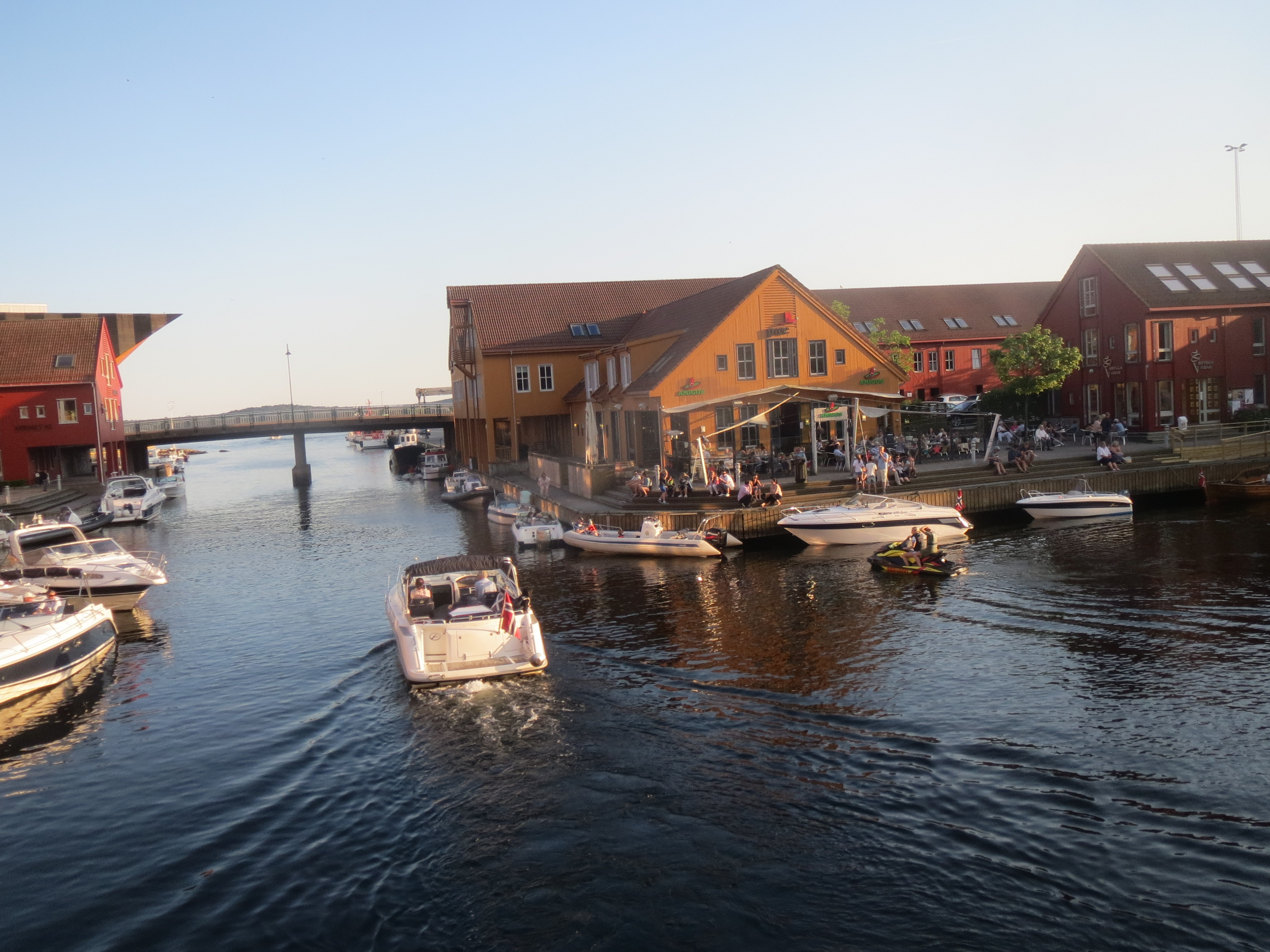
- View of Gravanekanalen in Odderøya
- Interactive map of the island

Geography
- Location: Agder, Norway
- Coordinates: 58.141072754143366°N 7.996432862431801°E
- Area: 0.7 km^{2} (0.27 sq mi)
- Length: 1.5 km (0.93 mi)
- Width: 700 m (2300 ft)
- Coastline: 4 km (2.5 mi)
- Highest elevation: 92 m (302 ft)
- Highest point: Odderøytoppen

Administration
- Norway
- County: Agder
- Municipality: Kristiansand Municipality

Odderøya is an island in Kristiansand Municipality in Agder county, Norway. The 0.7-square-kilometre (170-acre) island lies immediately to the south of the city centre of Kristiansand and it is connected to the mainland by four bridges. The island creates a natural division between the eastern and western parts of the port of Kristiansand.

The Gravanekanalen canal separates the island of Odderøya from the city center and the Fiskebrygga fishing wharf. Prior to 1993, the island was owned by the Norwegian government and it was used as a naval base and training grounds, but since that time, Kristiansand Municipality has taken over and is now using it for recreational purposes. The island is mostly undeveloped, but the municipal development plan includes an area on the island where they are planning to build up to 500 homes.

== History ==
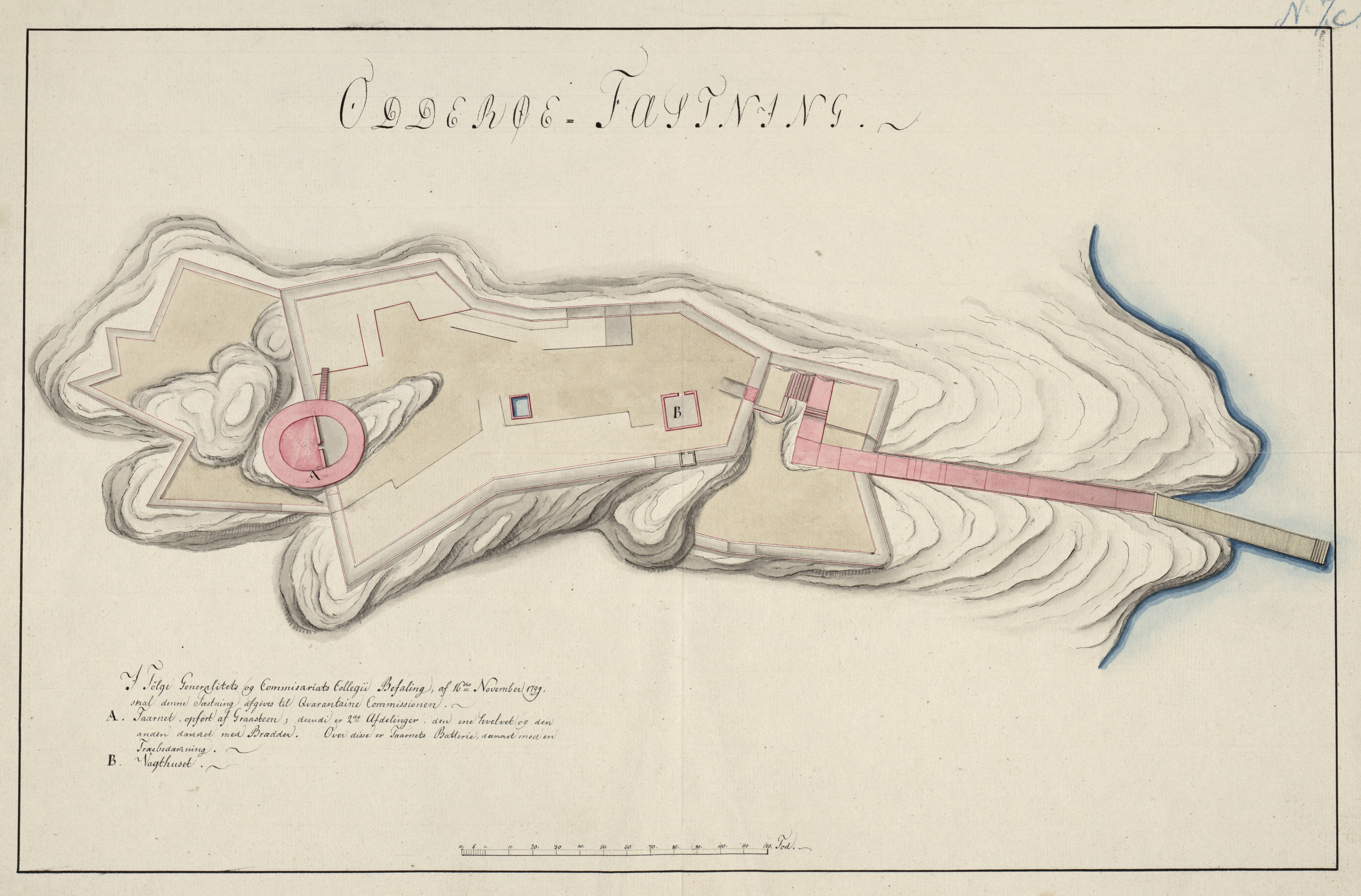
Map of the first Odderøe Fortress, located on what later was nicknamed "The lazaretto height" (about 1800) Drawing: National Library of Norway

There are signs of ancient human activity on Odderøya. At Bendiksbukta, a dagger, an ax, and other tools of flint dating back to the Stone Age (around the year 1000 BC) have been found. On Odderøya, there are many interesting traces of military activity. Within this defined geographic area, there are military fortifications stretching from the Great Northern War to the end of the Cold War. Key tracks from the battle of 9 April 1940 (Operation Weserübung) are partially visible. There was military activity on Odderøya from 1667 until 1999, when the fortress was phased out.

The quarantine station or lazaretto at Odderøya was the largest in Northern Europe and was in operation from 1804 to 1914. In 1804, it was a quarantine station for all of Denmark-Norway and Holstein. The quarantine station was for ships where plague (disease) had spread aboard the ship. In connection with quarantine operations, the island also began to need its own cemetery, nicknamed the Cholera Cemetery. It is located at Kjerregårdsbukta. The quarantine station was separated from the rest of the island with a high wall that runs from the height of Lasaretthøyden to Bendiksbukta. It was built in the years 1800 to 1807 and is under restoration.

At times, Odderøya has been closed to the public due to military activity. There are a large number of former gun emplacements around the island from varying periods of time for cannons, machine guns, and mortars. Most recently, the island was closed to the public from 1940 until 23 June 1992, after the Odderøya Fortress was closed. Since the municipality took over the island, it has been a popular excursion and hiking area.

=== World War II ===
On 9 April 1940, eight Norwegian soldiers lost their lives in the battle against German aircraft and warships during the invasion of Norway in Operation Weserübung at Odderøya Fortress. The fortress returned the fire from the German warships and attacks by Luftwaffe bombers. The attackers of Kristiansand and Arendal consisted of the light cruiser Karlsruhe, three torpedo boats, and seven smaller vessels, one mothership, and around 1,000 soldiers. Three times between 5:00 and 7:00 in the morning, the German forces tried to penetrate and to put troops ashore, but each time they were forced away because of shelling from Odderøya. One of the shells from Karlsruhe missed the fortress. By accident this shell hit the upper part of Kristiansand Cathedral's church tower. In addition to the shell hits at the fortress, a bombshell led to an explosion at the ammunition depot. Bombs from planes hit both the fortress and civilian neighborhoods of the city, and the planes were shot at by anti-aircraft guns on board the Norwegian destroyer HNoMS Gyller which was present in Kristiansand harbor. Several fires occurred where the bombs hit. At ten o'clock in the morning, the commander at the cruiser decided to break through whatever the resistance would be. Meanwhile, defenders at Odderøya got confusing orders not to fire on British or French warships. When the German force attacked again, one of the signal flags was confused with a French flag, and therefore the fire from the fortress was withheld. When the force was landed, it met no resistance, and the Norwegian commander surrendered the fortress. One of the anchors of the German merchant ship MS Seattle is exhibited by the Western battery of the fortress. During the battle the ship came under crossfire, was hit and sank.

The coordinated invasion of several cities started the former neutral Norway's participation in World War II on the Allied side. In the later years of the war, many of the guns were taken out of their positions and placed at other locations further out to the open sea (Skagerrak). German military forces held the fort until the capitulation in 1945.

=== Post-war ===
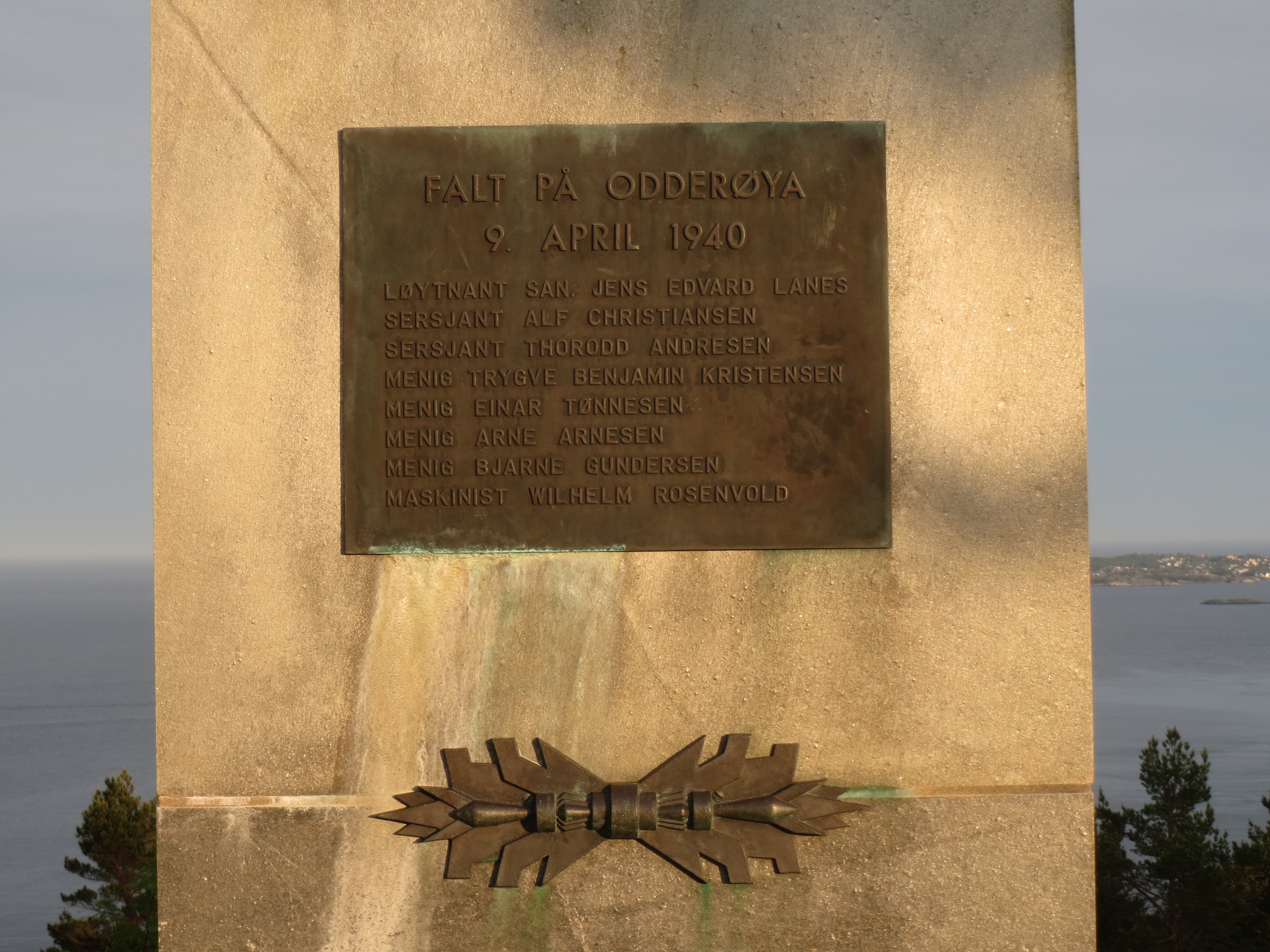
April 9, 1940 Battle Memorial

Today, there is a memorial of the fallen soldiers at the abandoned fort on top of the island. In much of the post-war period, the fort on Odderøya served as a base and boot camp for the Norwegian Coastal Artillery. There is now a dedicated conservation plan for the many important objects of culture historical interest on the island.

Following the takeover of the island by Kristiansand Municipality, Odderøya has been used for varying cultural purposes and there has been broad agreement that the eastern and southern part will remain as untouched as possible. The quayside on the island's west side, however is under construction and will become residential area, intersected by new, artificial canals.

There are two current museum exhibitions on the island run by volunteers who show the military history of the fortress. Of which the photograph exhibition on the southern tip is open every Sunday.

== East side of Odderøya ==
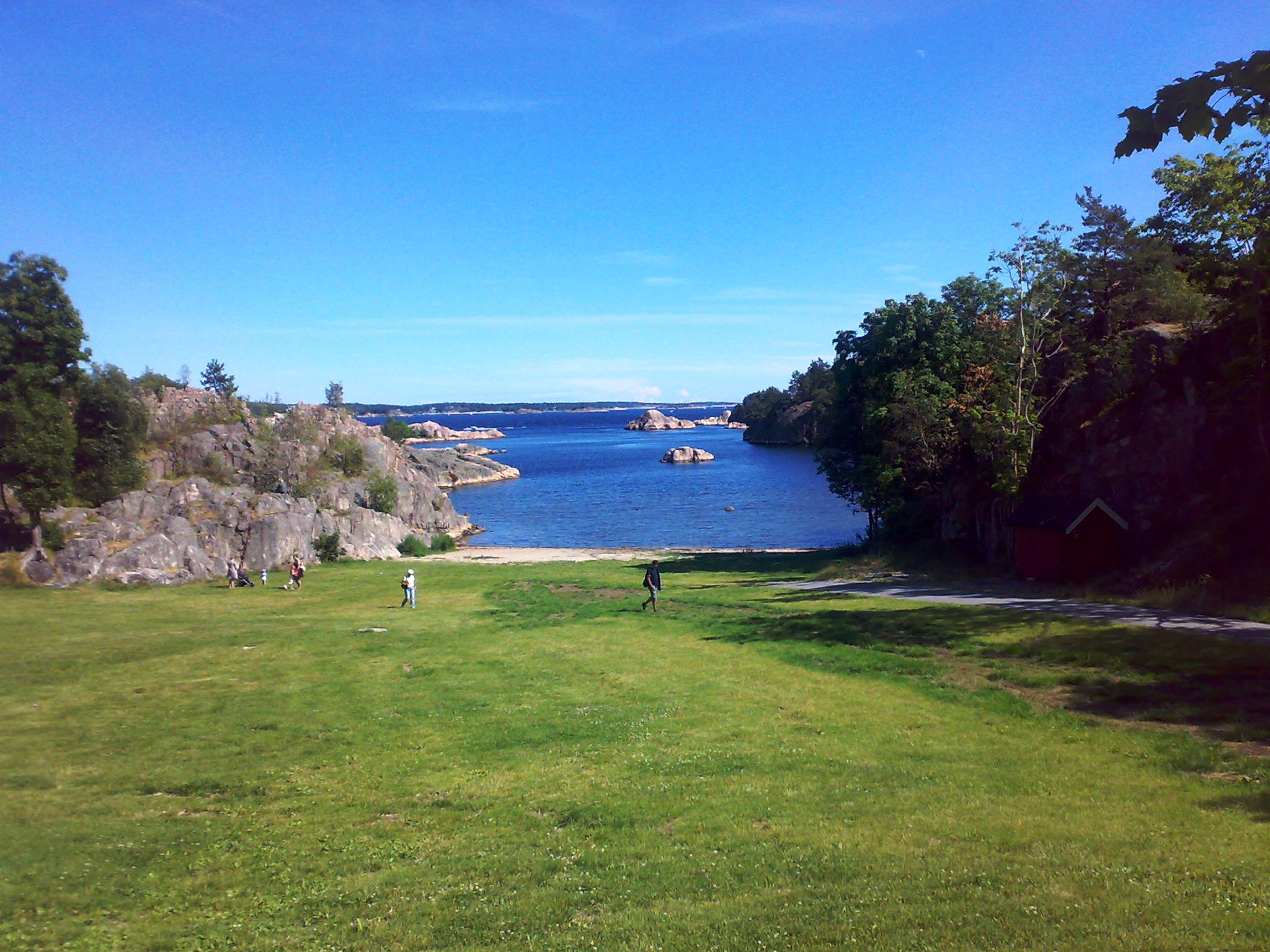
Bendiksbukta

On the island's east side was an important port and cargo space even before the settlements in the area had been named Kristiansand and was founded as a city. The site was suitable for loading lumber that could be floated on the river Torridalselva (Otra) and then loaded aboard a vessel for further transportation. In this part of Odderøya there are many abandoned cannon positions. A path leads up to the Mellombatteriet where protected cannons from the mid-20th century still are in the original positions. The Quarantine Wall, the wall that had been built to separate the local population from patients who were affected by diseases is still visible and has been restored. On the east side, there are rocks and beaches suitable for swimming spots, including "the cholera beach" and Bendiksbukta.

== Silokaia and Kilden Performing Arts Centre on the west side ==
Kanalbyen neighbourhood is being build on the west side of Odderøya

On the west side, there are a quay harbor, warehouses, a grain and cement silo, and cleaning and tank farms. The port facilities, that in the summer are used mostly as a port for cruise ships, are part of the Kristiansand harbor. Grain Silo on pier 13 is designed by Sverre Aasland and Arne Korsmo for Christiansands Mills and is characterized as an "outstanding, independent and architectural work completed," and was awarded funds Houen diploma in 1939. The new Kilden Performing Arts Centre is built next door and was opened in 2012. Beside the parking garage behind Kilden, a staircase leads further up the island. The overdue grain silo has been decided to be rebuilt after an architectural competition, to contain a large art collection. The quayside is under construction to be transformed into a residential area. There is also a huge indoor climbing park, Xland.

South of the harbor area is the steepest part of Odderøya. There is a strolling route down to the Odderøya Lighthouse from the western battery. The city's sewage treatment plant is located in a tunnel into the rock near the lighthouse. There is also a staircase up and down from the lighthouse to the southern part of Odderøya. Strolling around these stairs is at your own risk, due to danger of rock fall.

== Voluntary work and local conservation debate ==
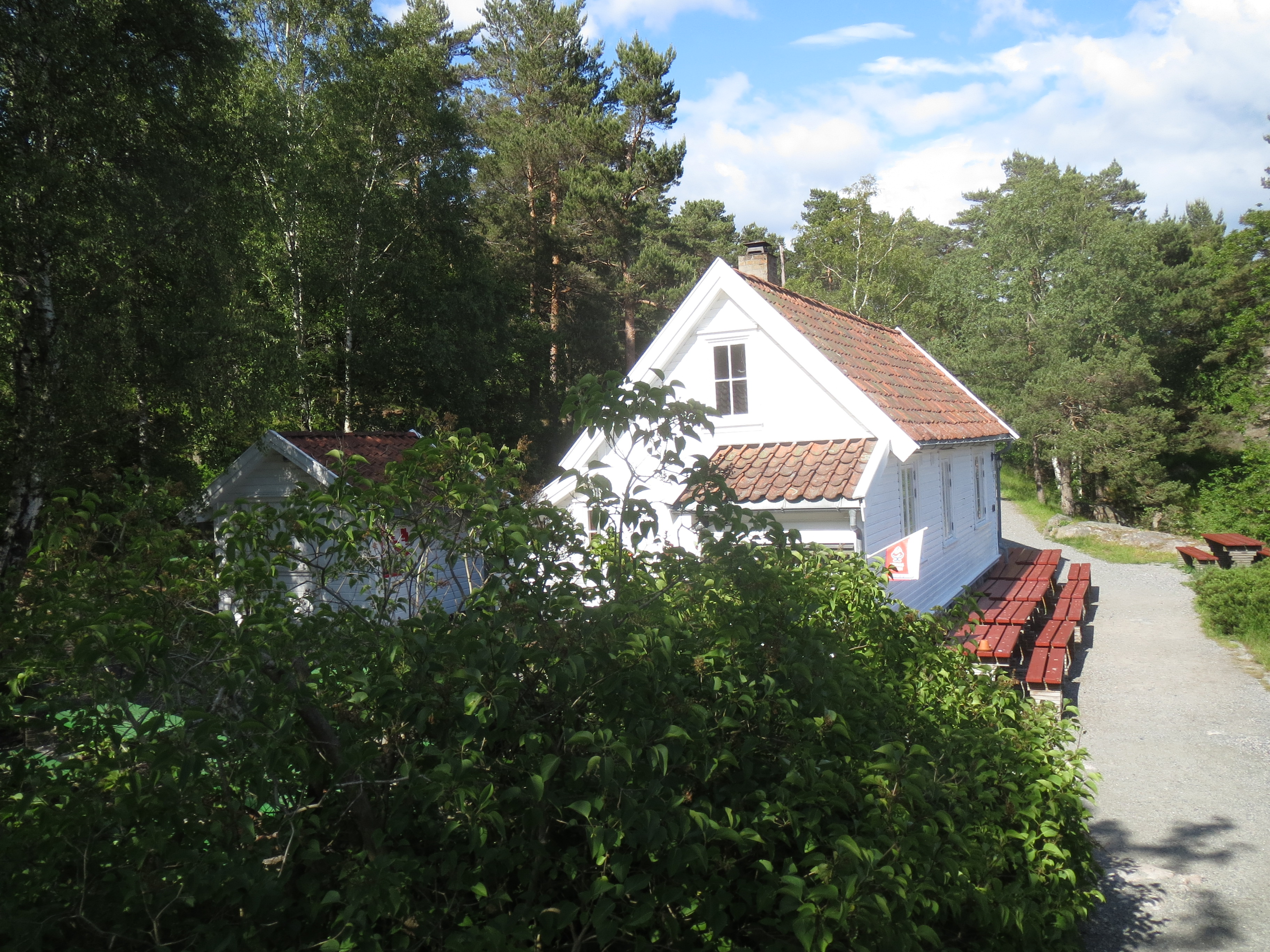
The former watchman's residence.

After the island was abandoned as a military area, it has to some extent been a local debate about the use of the island in the future. There has been general agreement that the island's main older cultural heritage must be preserved. However, there has been a vigorous debate about the construction of roads, apartment buildings and commercial buildings, especially on the western side of the island. The city council has debated how many of the buildings from the former fort should be preserved, as well as what can be demolished and replaced with more modern and beneficial buildings. There are plans to refurbish, restore, and reopen the bunker underneath the gun emplacements containing the former command post on top of the island as a museum.

Many of the citizens have become involved in voluntary conservation work. Odderøyas Venner is a voluntary association which organizes volunteer work and operates the cafè at the former watchman's residence on the southern tip of the island, offering refreshments on Sundays all year long from 11 am until 4 pm. In a former gunpowder house next to the cafe, there is a small museum exhibit illustrating the naval battle of Kristiansand on 9 April 1940.

== Culture and tourism ==
Odderøya is trying to establish itself as a regional cultural center. After the military activities were moved out, artists, galleries and filmmakers were established in the old barracks. Graphical printing on Odderøya is produced by renowned contemporary artists. The press in use was imported from Paris, and has been used by, among others, Pablo Picasso and Edvard Munch. In the marina Nodevika, a maritime museum with a museums marina are to be completed in 2015.

Many viewpoints offer a wonderful view over the bay and the entrance to the city. There are roe deer on the island, and a pond named Salamander Pond; there is also other wildlife. Near the island's highest point (92 metres (302 ft) above sea level), there is al also a former bear den (last inhabited by bears in the 1700s). From the top of the island, there are outstanding views of the Kristiansandsfjorden, islands like Dvergsøya and Flekkerøya, and the Oksøy Lighthouse and Grønningen Lighthouse. Odderøya offers opportunities for recreation, walking in the woods, swimming and fishing from the rocks, despite the proximity to the city. Some roads on the island are also accessible by wheelchair.

=== The Art Silo ===
The former grain silo located next to the Kilden Performing Arts Centre is being turned into an art museum for visual arts and adventure center. There has been a lot of local debate over whether it is the right use of public money to take care of the silo and redo it.

=== Odderøya Museum Harbor ===
Odderøya Museum Harbor at Nodeviga Marina offers maritime activities and has a special focus on plastic boat's history and maritime activities in small boats after World War II. There are activities for children of various kinds.

=== Indoor climbing facilities ===
Xland Adrenaline Park is open every day 10AM-10PM. Inside this indoor climbing center there are 110 different items, low and high-altitude obstacle trails, climbing walls, climbing grids, a zip-coaster, zip-lines, free fall-offs and more. The facility is a new establishment from April 2019.

=== Indoor concert facilities ===
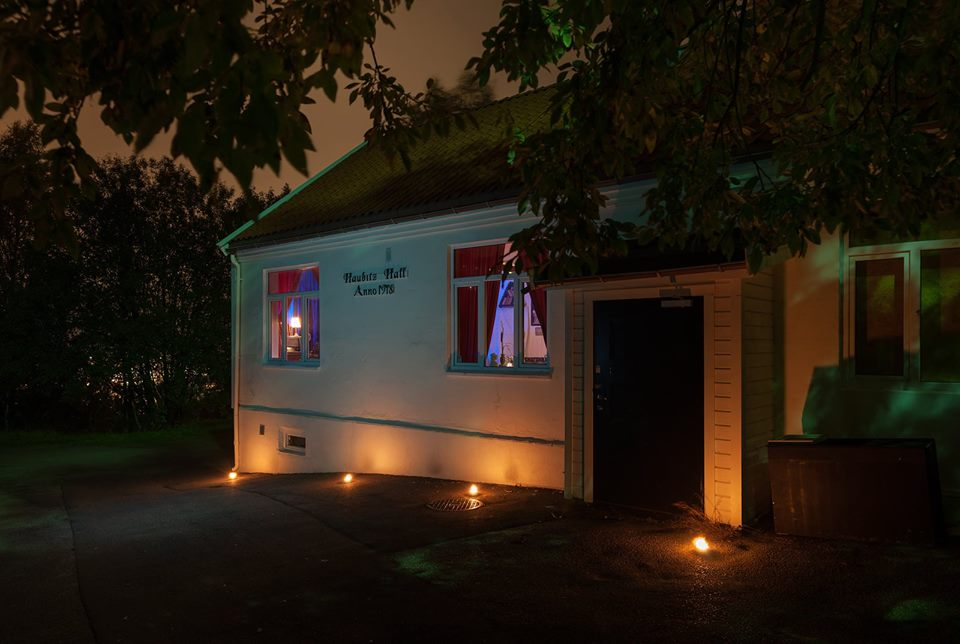
Haubitz Hall Salongen

Haubitz Hall Salongen is a lounge on the top of Odderøya that is used for smaller club concerts, with mostly local artists. Haubitz Hall Salongen is inspired by American jazz / cabaret clubs of the 1940s, as well as from the house's own history as an officers' booth and later a cinema room for the former boot camp. It is renowned for its current unique atmosphere.

Haubitz Laaven was incorporated into the Haubitz Hall concept in the fall of 2017. It hosts concerts and other events with between 100 and 600 people. The building was built by the Germans in the summer of 1940. It is on the site where the former ammunition warehouse that was destroyed in the air attack on Odderøya was located.

=== Concert venue ===
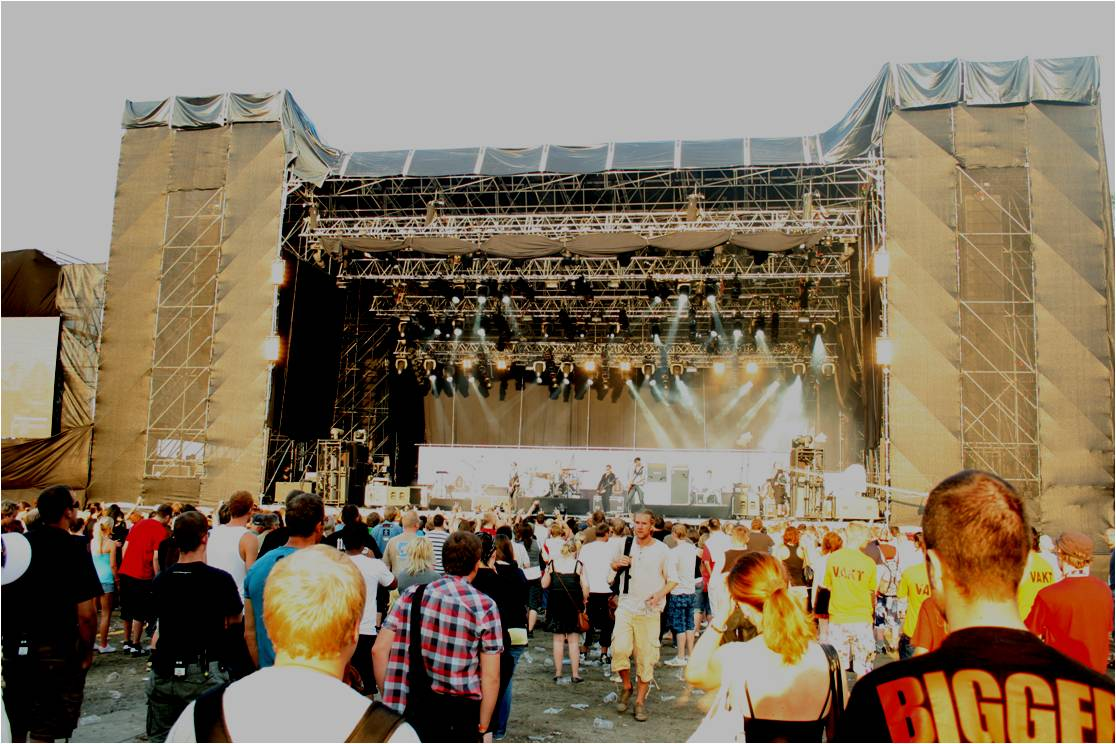
Stage from the Quart Festival at Odderøya

Parts of the Quart festival in 1992–2009 added Odderøya. Later, Odderøya has also been used as locations for live concerts. There have been concerts in Bendiksbukta, on the lawn, Odden, a rebuilt sports ground, and at a club in Odderøyhallen. In 2007, the sports ground was rebuilt with a new concert venue with an outdoor amphitheater, Odderøya Amphi, that has an audience capacity of 22,000.

=== On stage on Odderøya ===
Many different kinds of bands and musicians have given outdoors live concerts on Odderøya over the years, including David Bowie, Bryan Adams, Nick Cave, Alice Cooper, Ozzy Osbourne, John Fogerty, Bob Dylan, Sting, Kanye West, No Doubt, Foo Fighters, Aerosmith, Daft Punk, Björk, Alicia Keys, Black Eyed Peas, Damian Marley, Backstreet Boys, Pink, Slash, Oasis, Snoop Dogg, 50 Cent, Ron Wood, The Who, Marilyn Manson, Muse and Coldplay.

== Media gallery ==
Views from Odderøya.

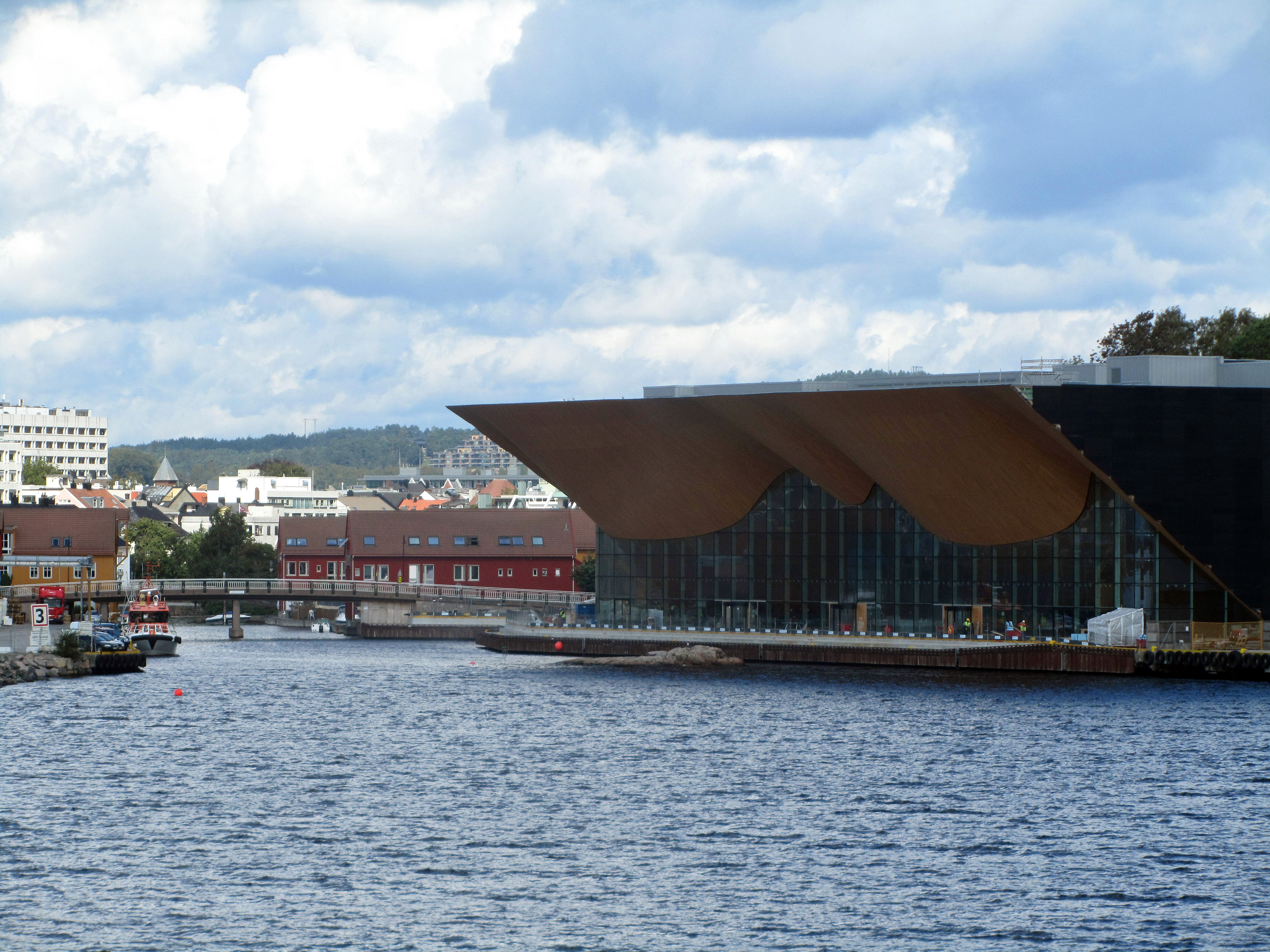
The approach to Gravanekanalen that separates Odderøya from the rest of the town centre of Kristiansand. Kilden Performing Arts Centre is to the right.

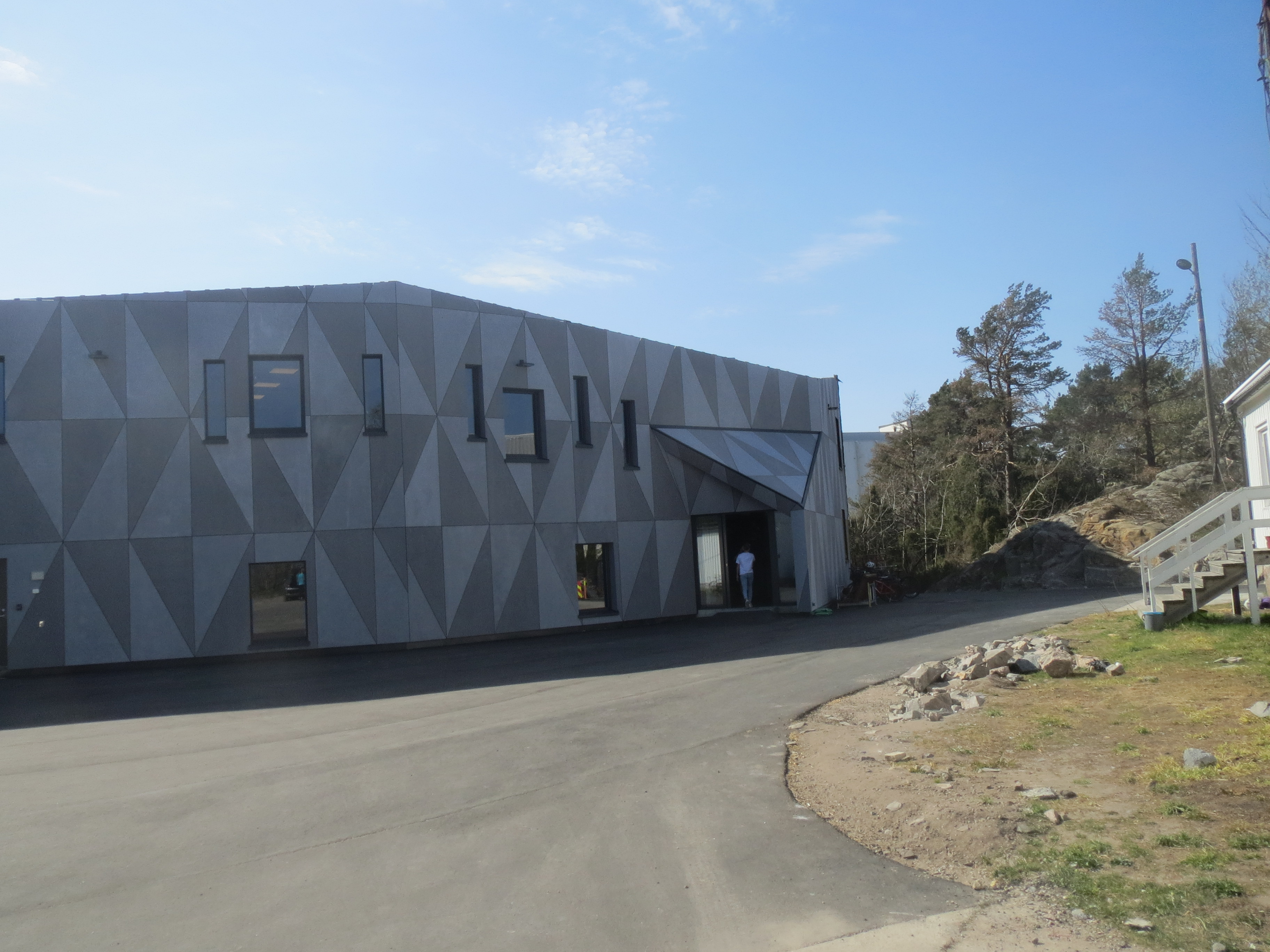
Entrance to the Xland indoor climbing park. (Opened 2019)

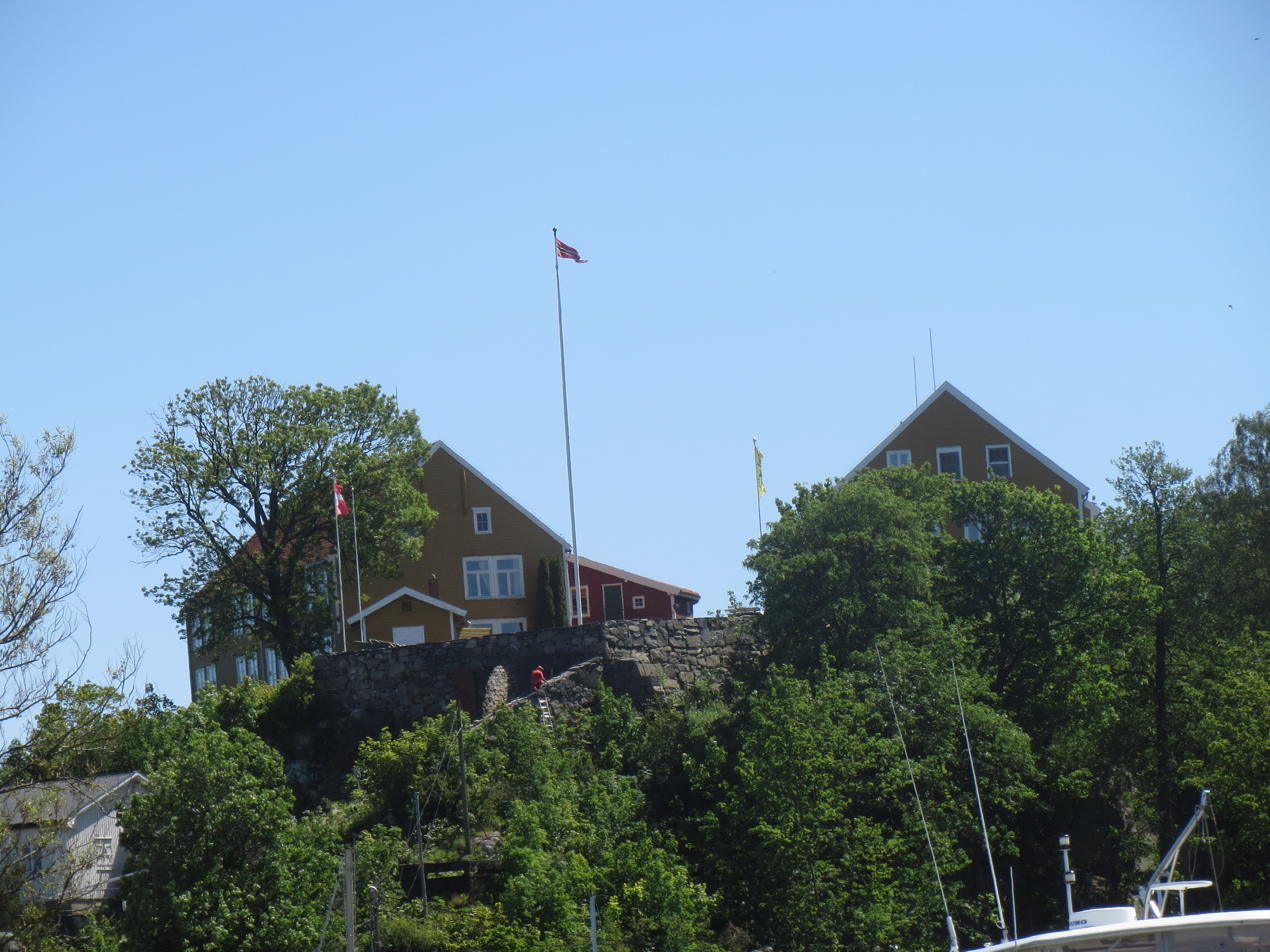
Lasaretthøyden was first built as a fortress, but became later, in 1804, the location for a plague hospital

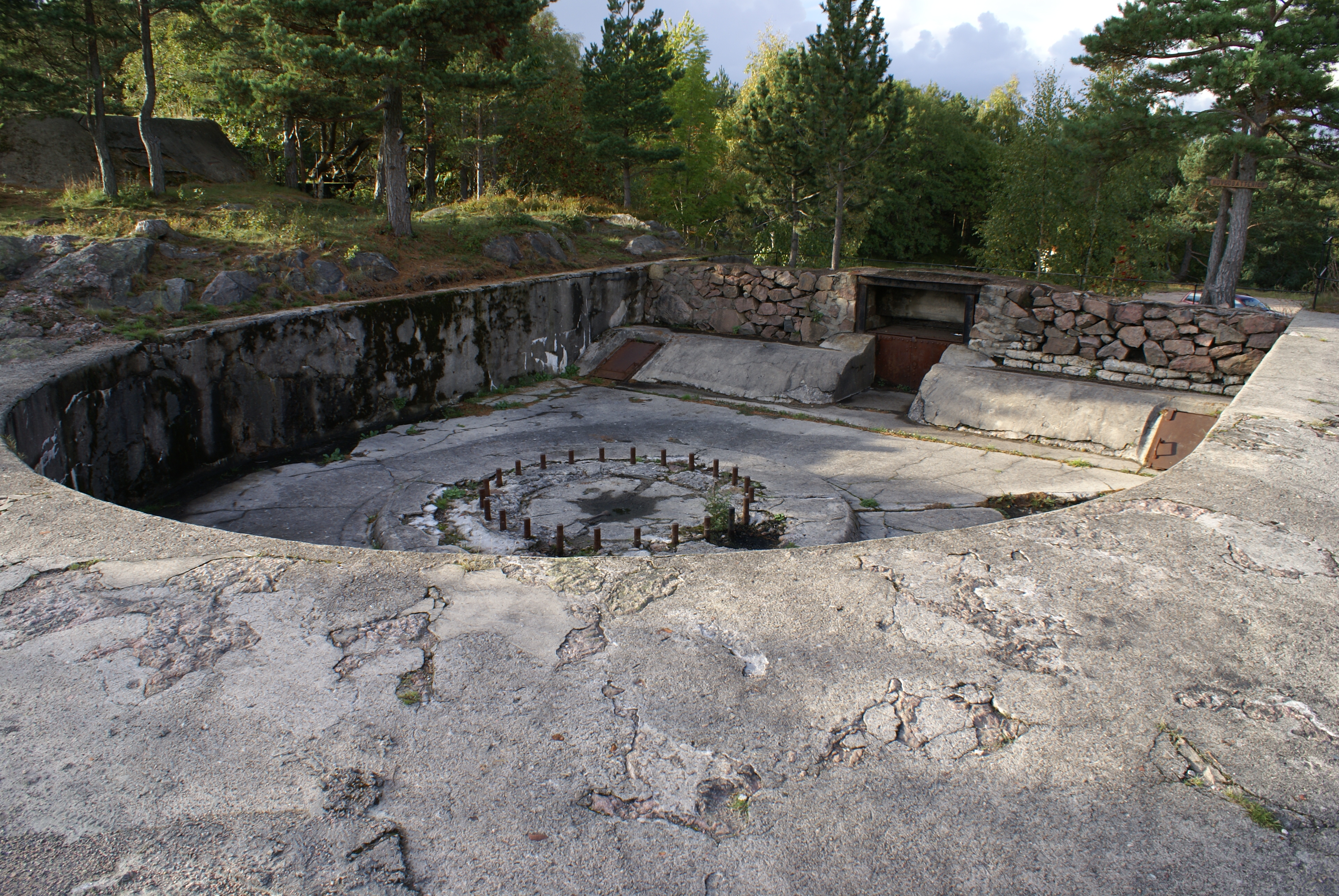
Cannon Foundation at Odderøya

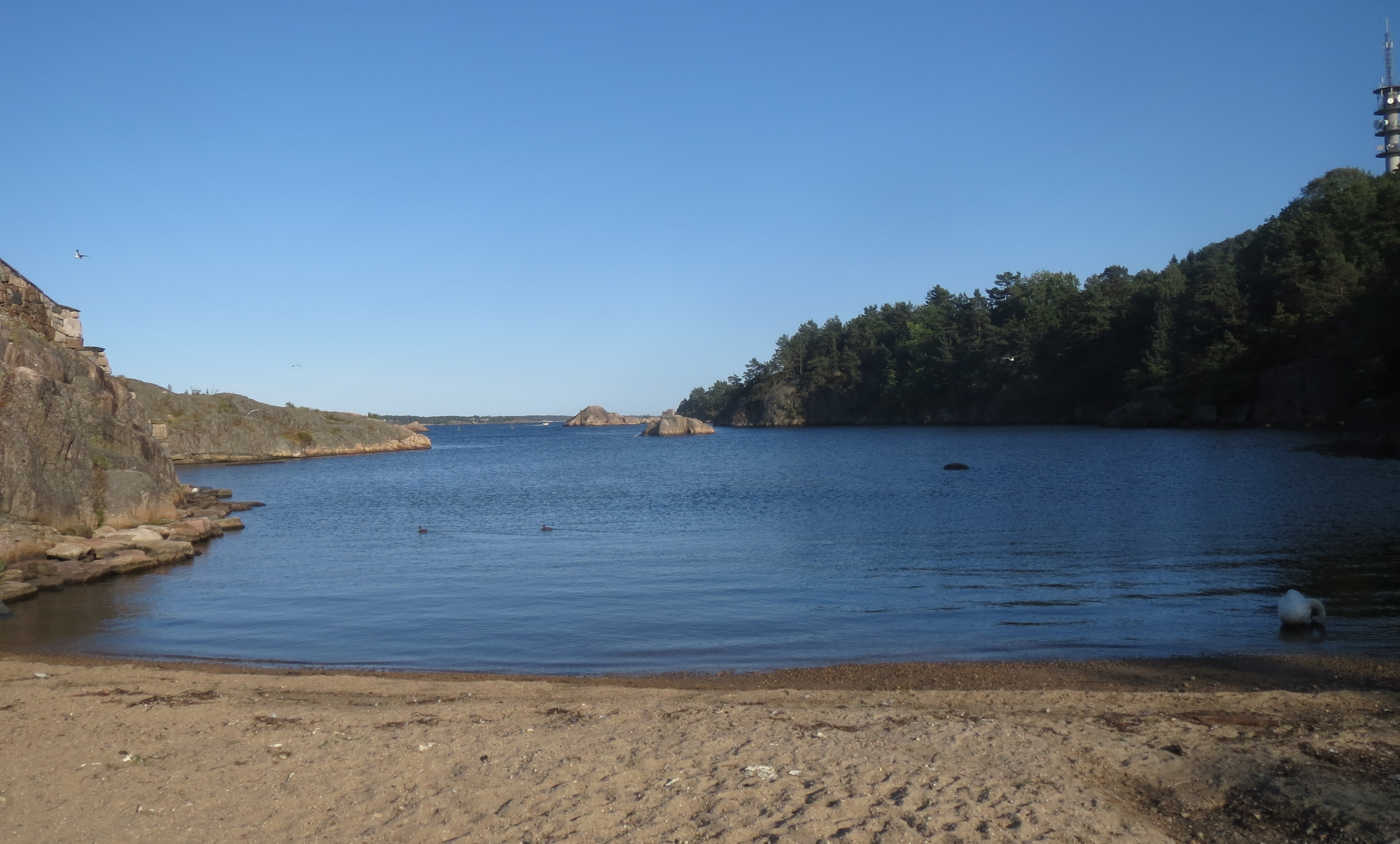
Beach and islets (Bendiksbukta)

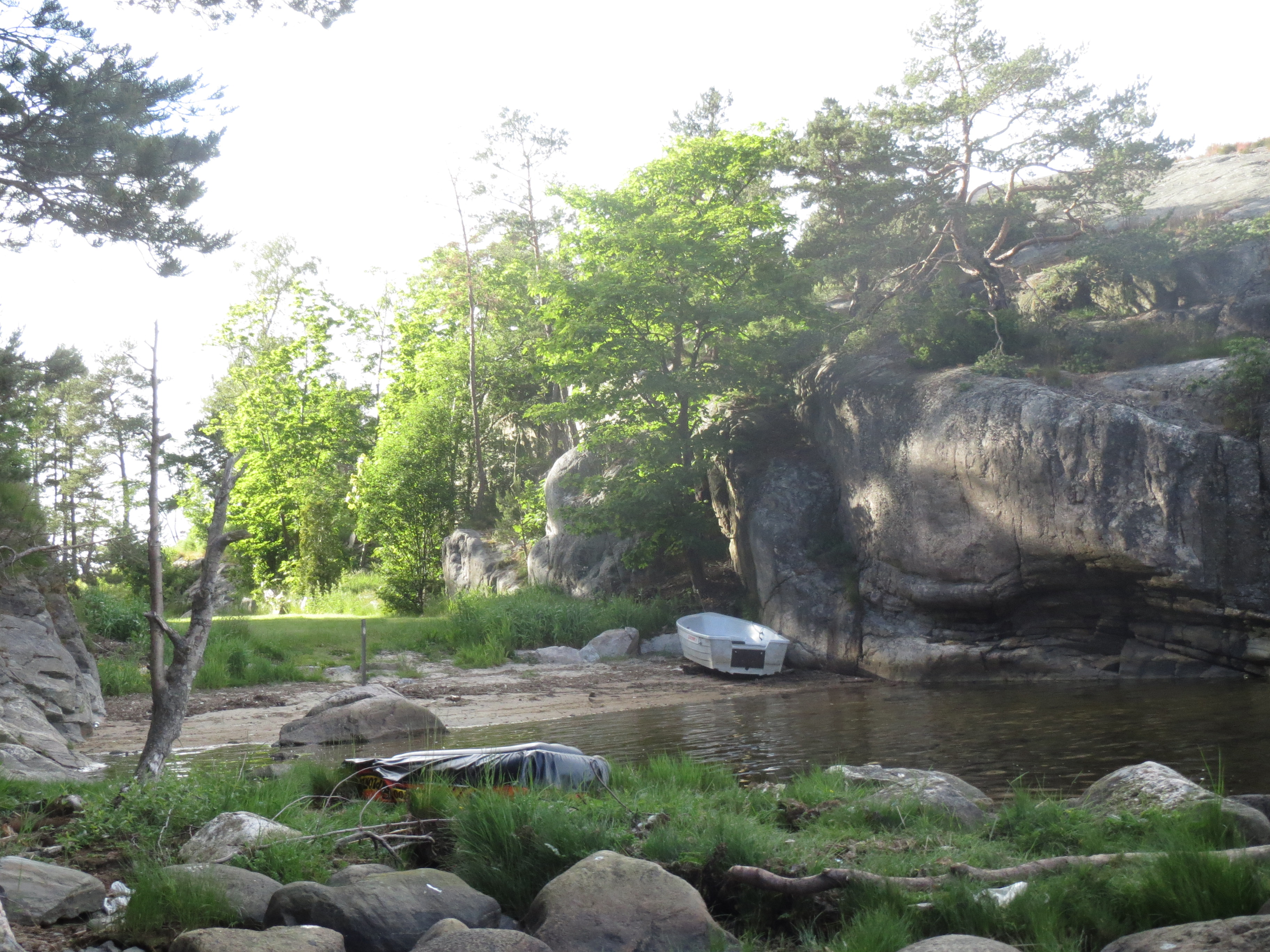
Lonely small beach at Odderøya

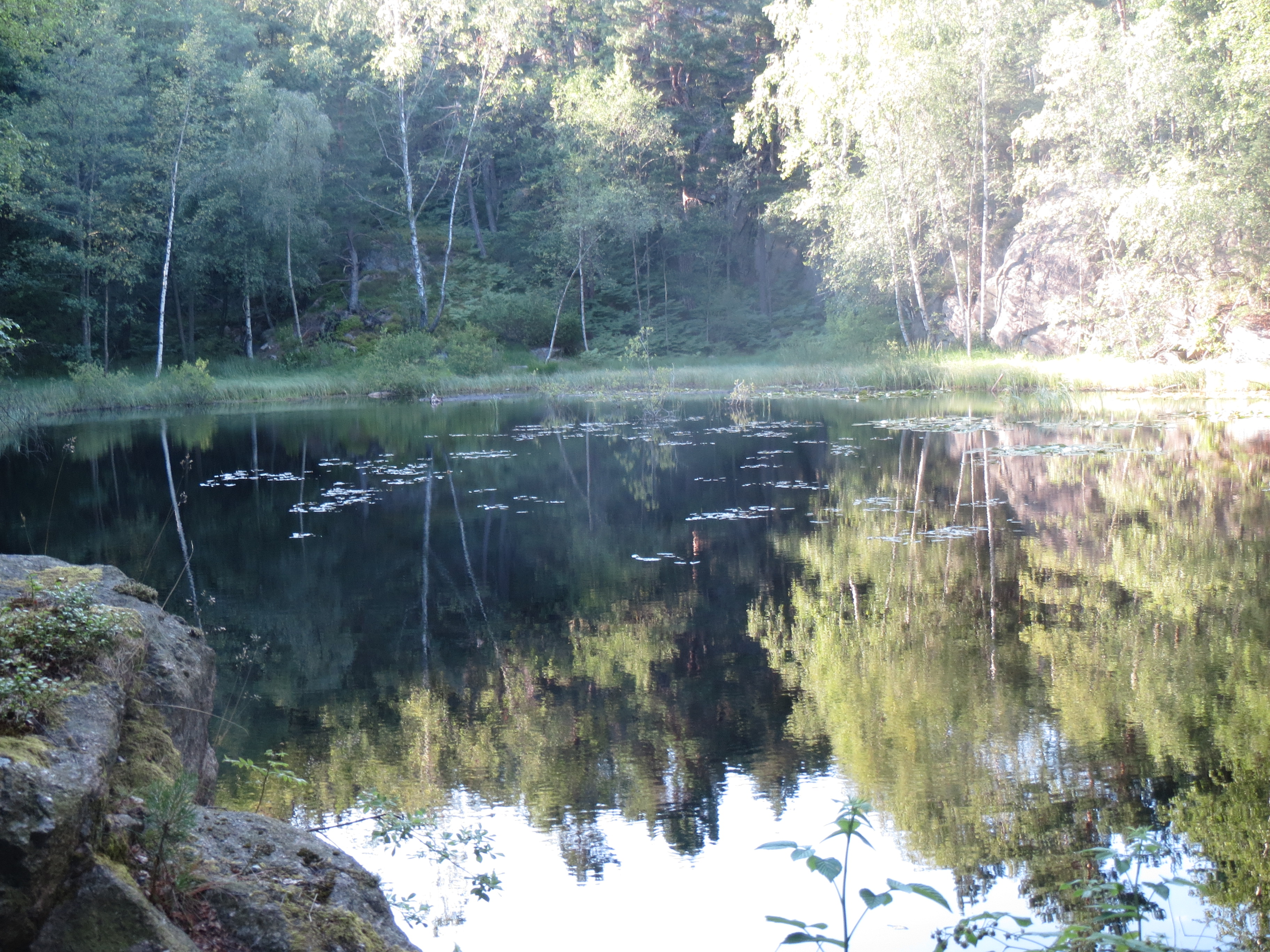
A pond at Odderøya

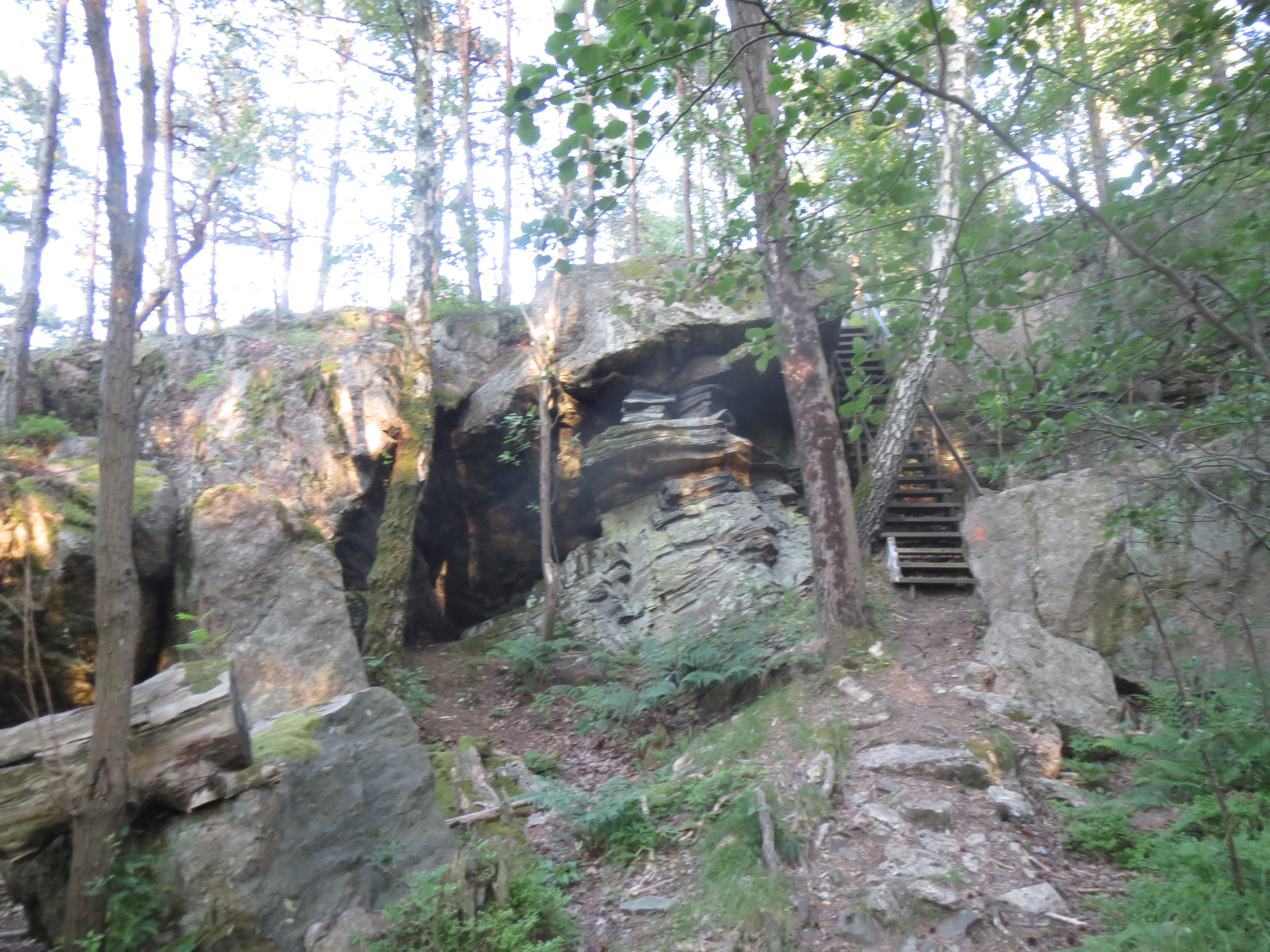
Caves at Odderøya

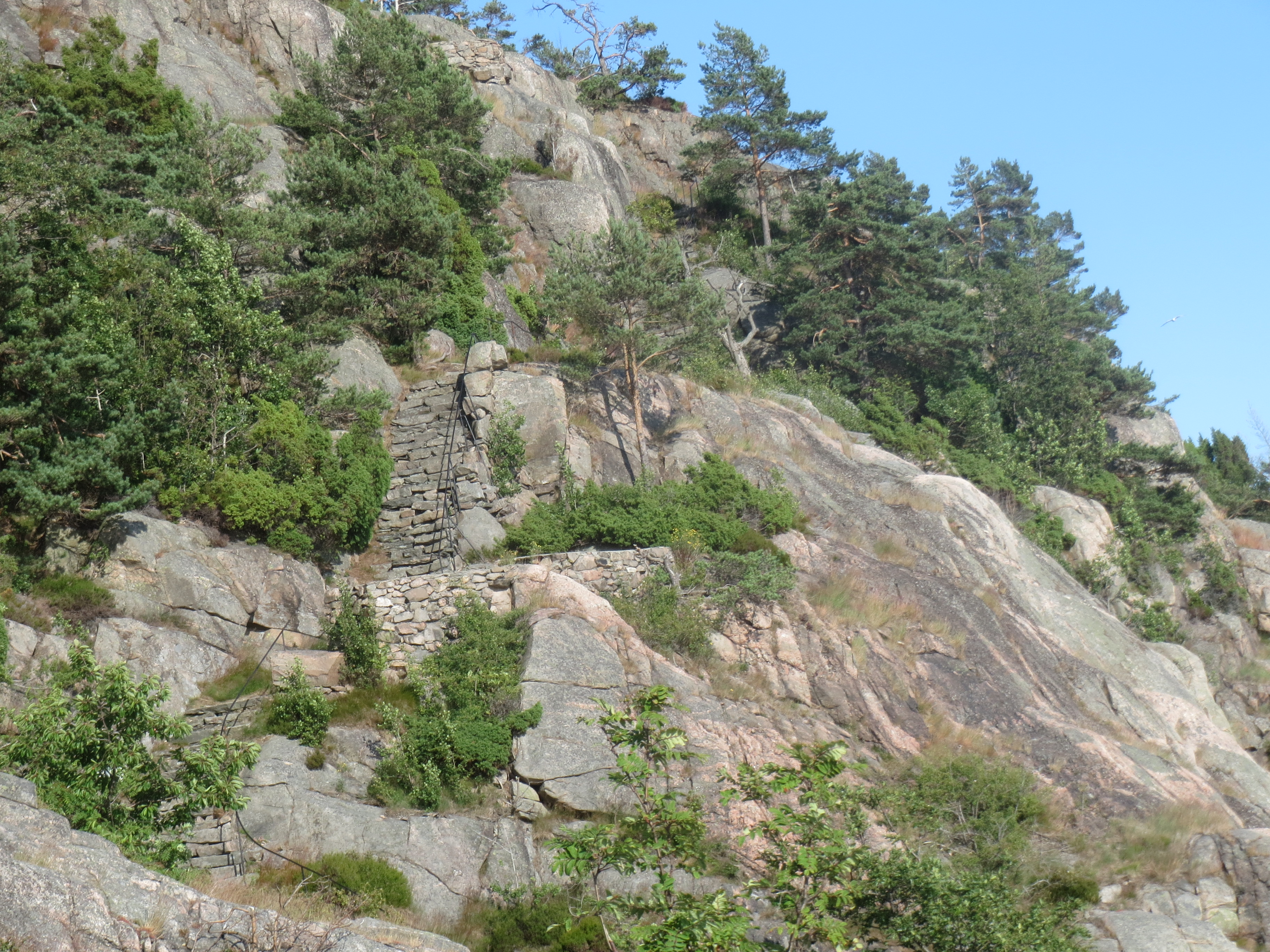
Steep cliffs and stairs. western Odderøya

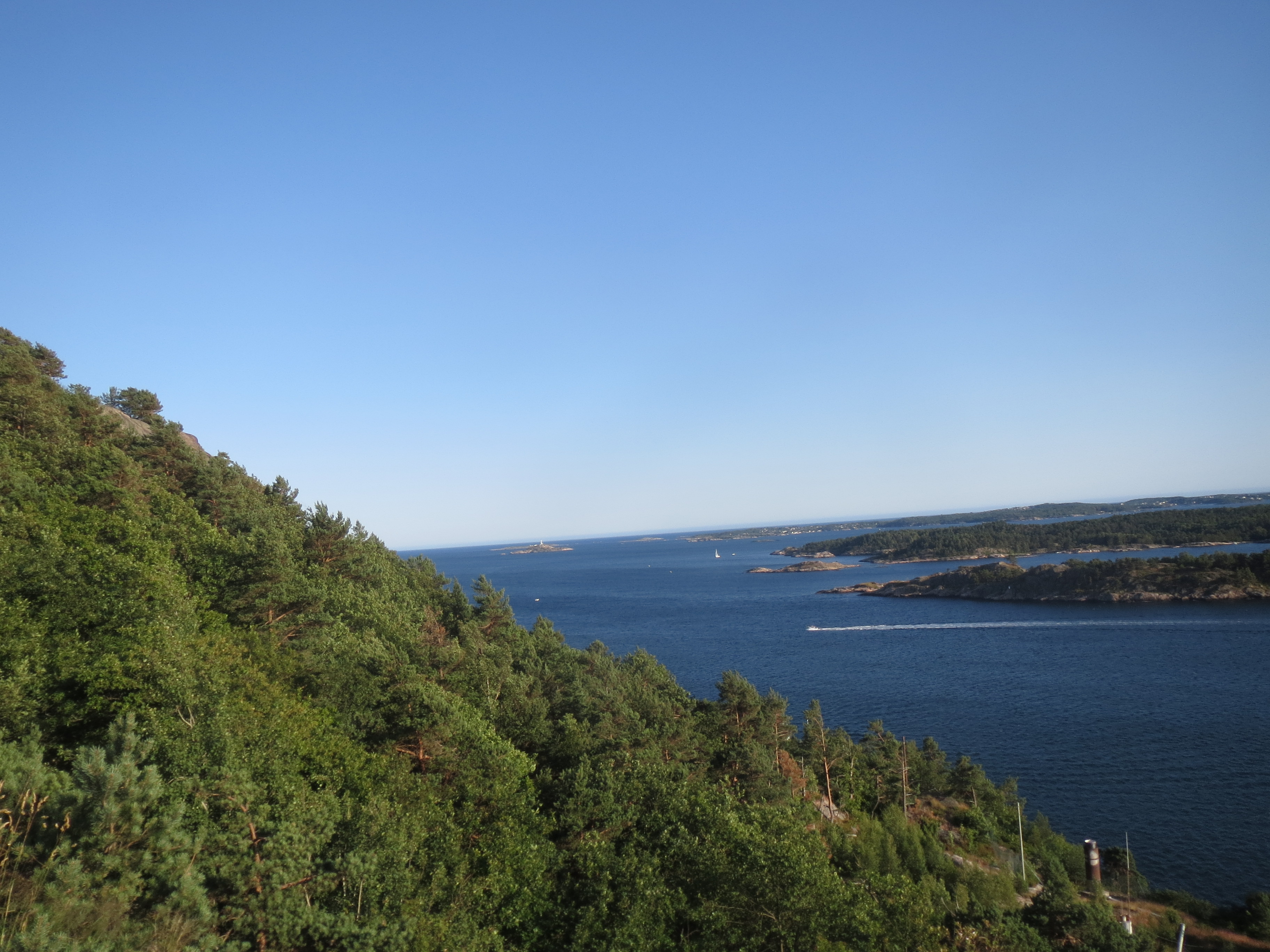
Hillside facing west at Odderøya

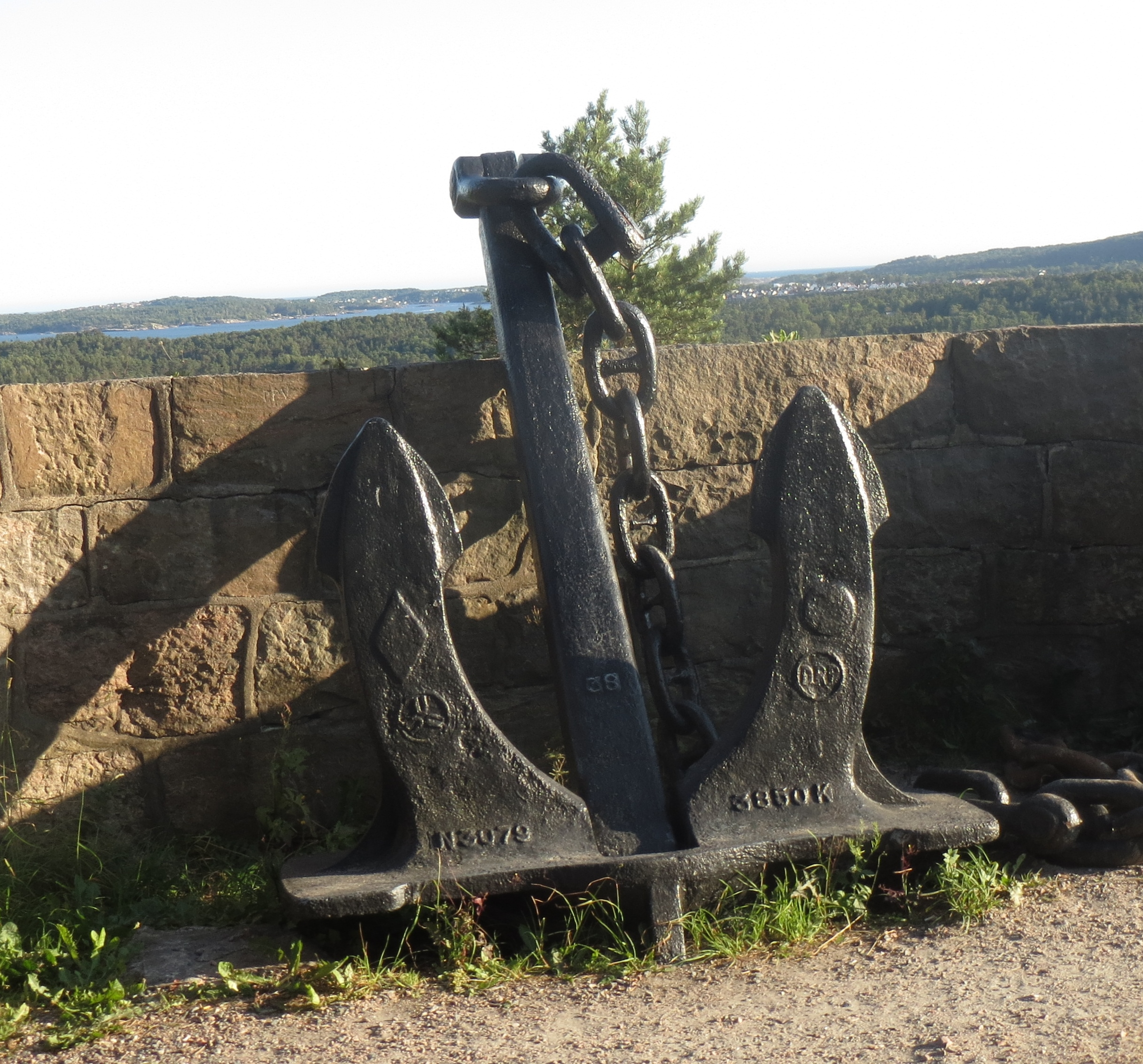
An anchor from MS Seattle

=== Cannons ===
Views of the cannons on the island.

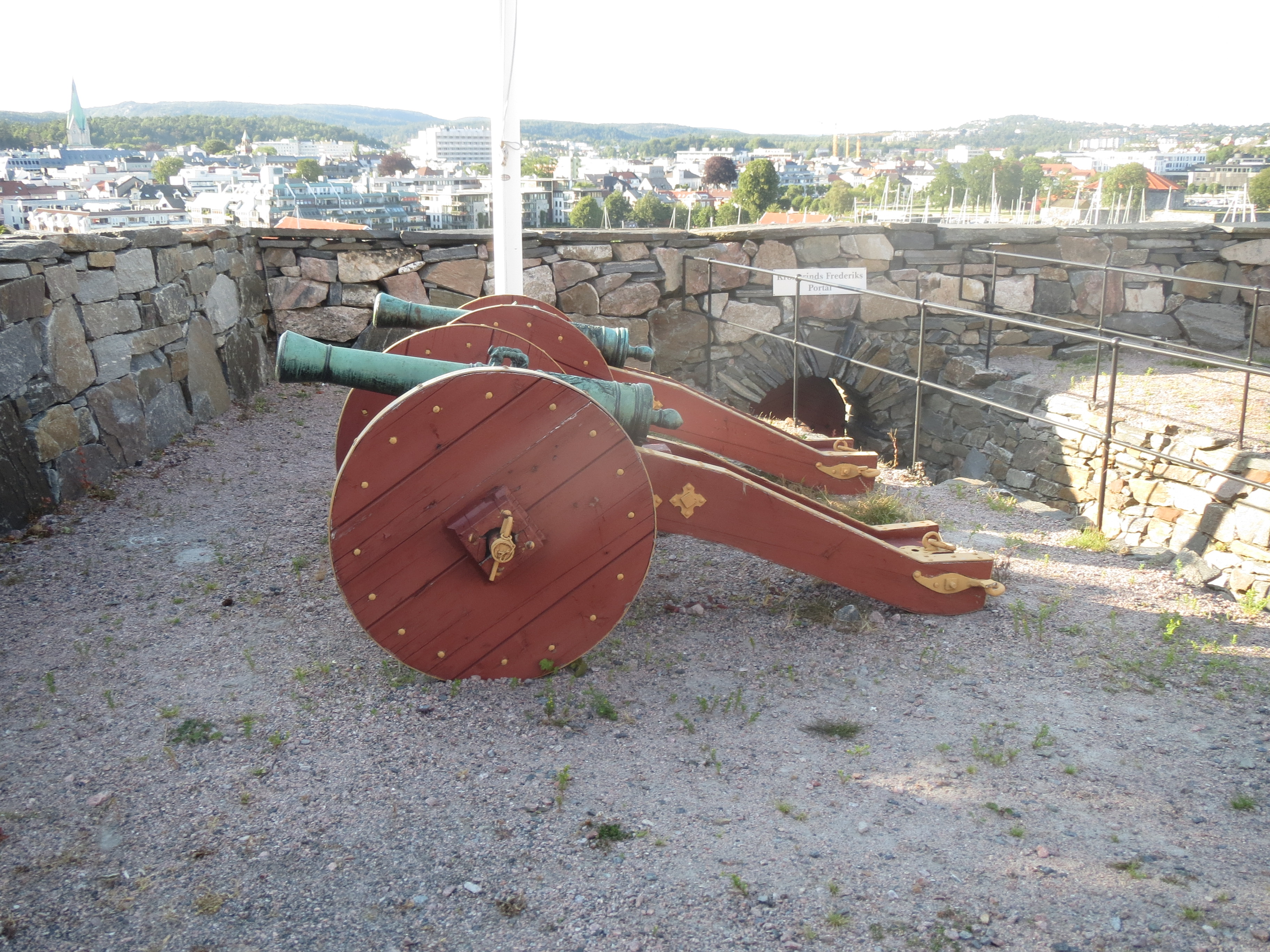
Cannons from the 17th century, the oldest on Odderøya

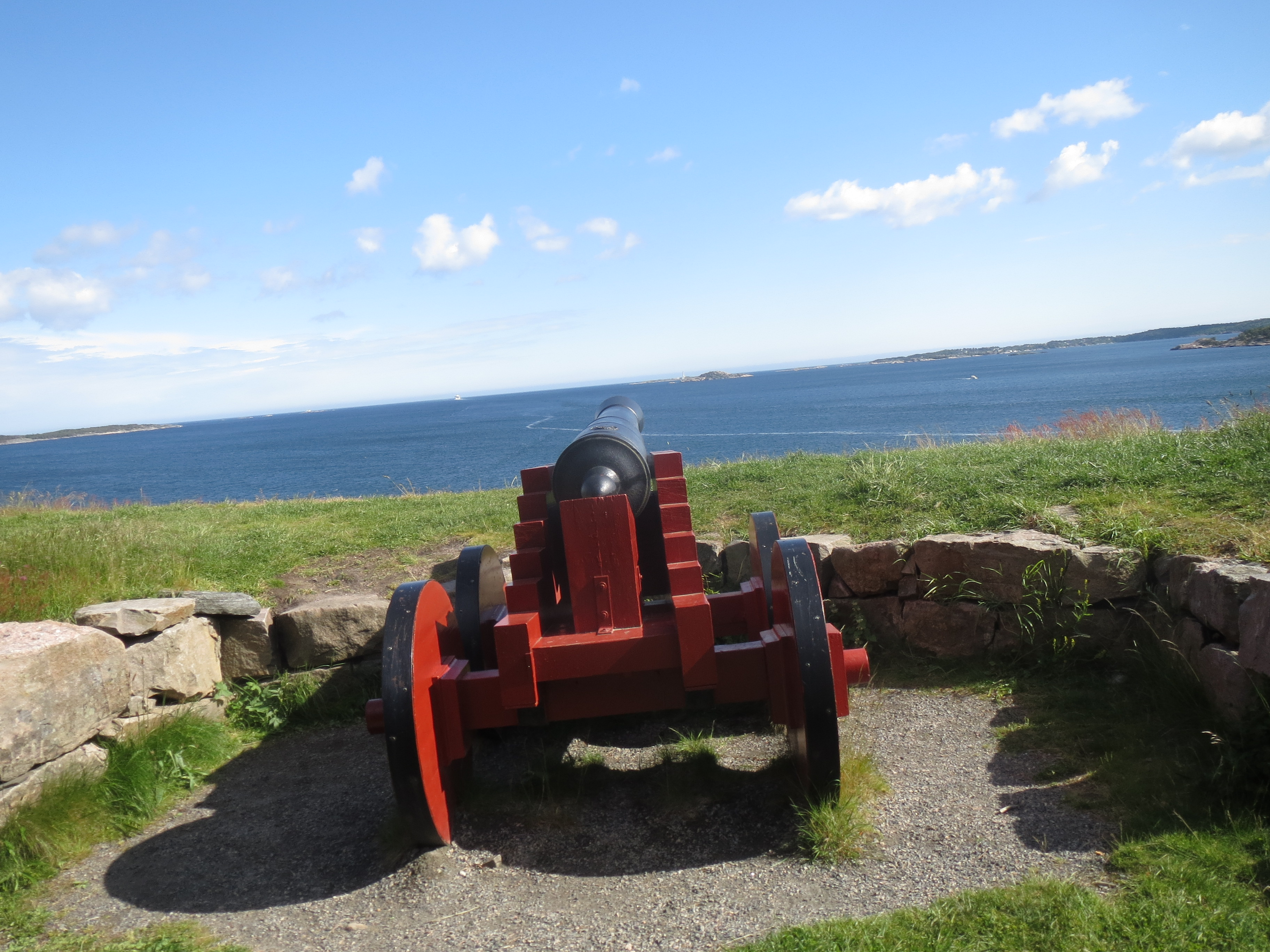
Cannon from the early 19th century, at the south of Odderøya

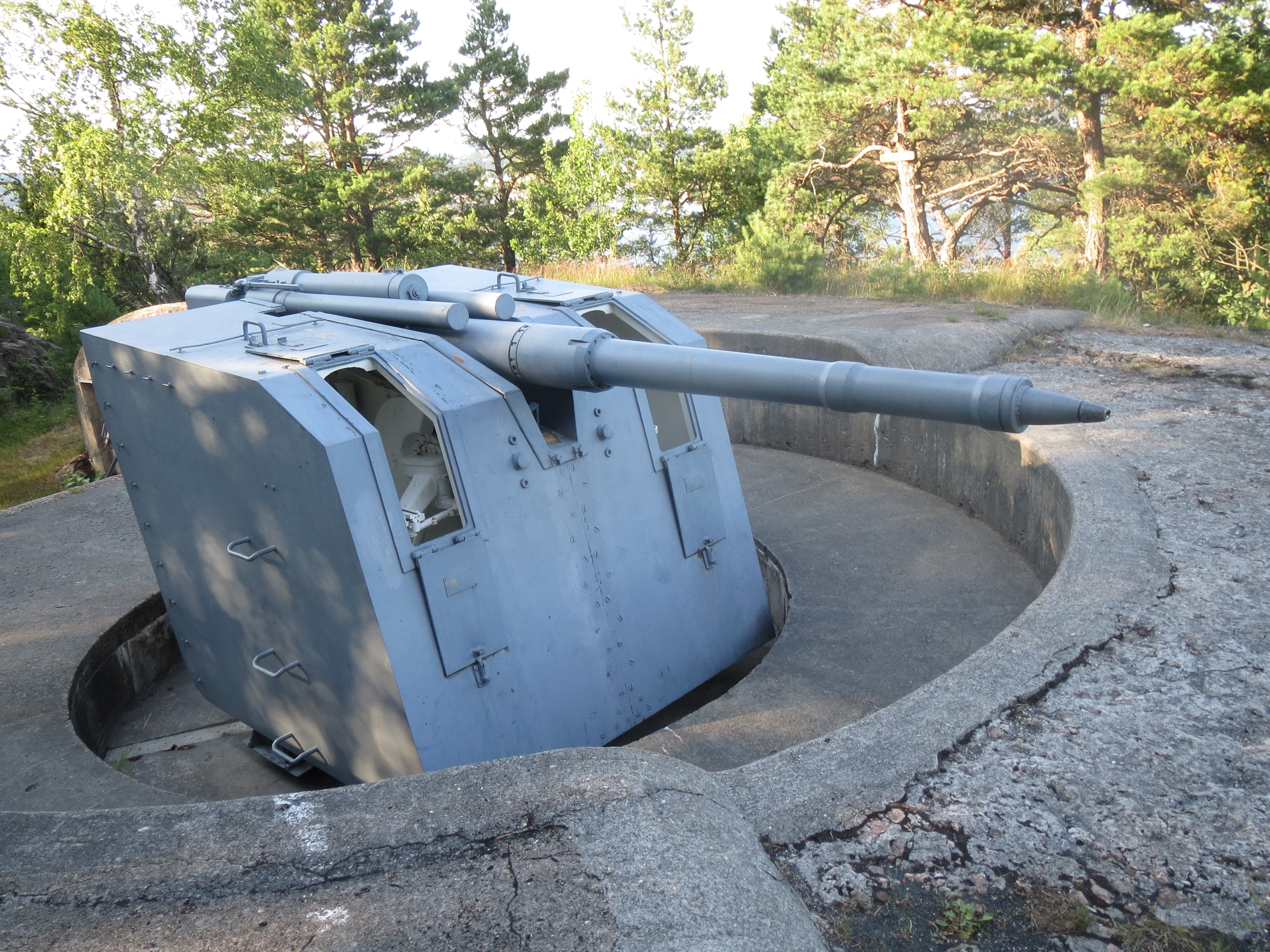
Fixed cannon from World War II

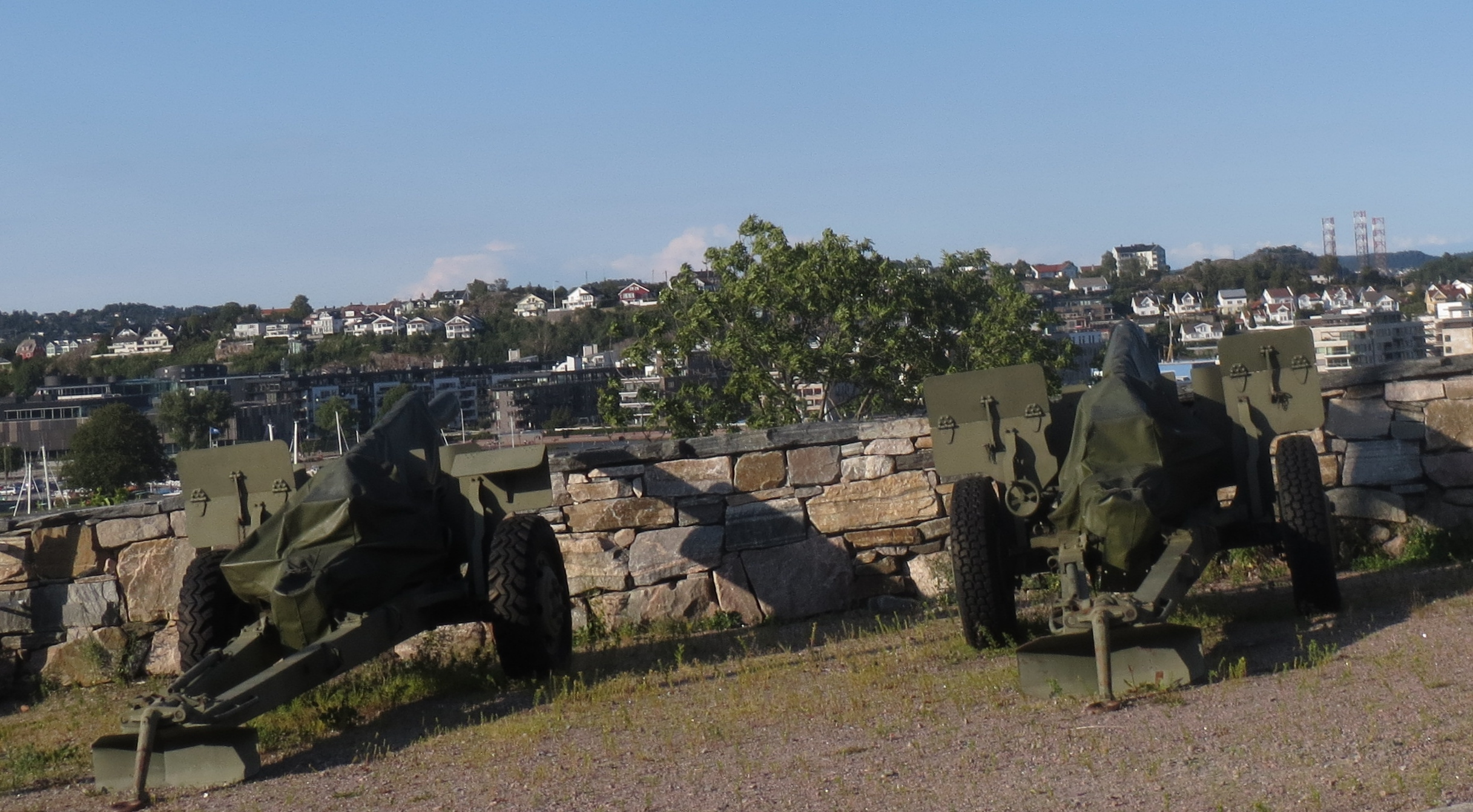
Field guns, intended for salute

=== From the quarantine station ===
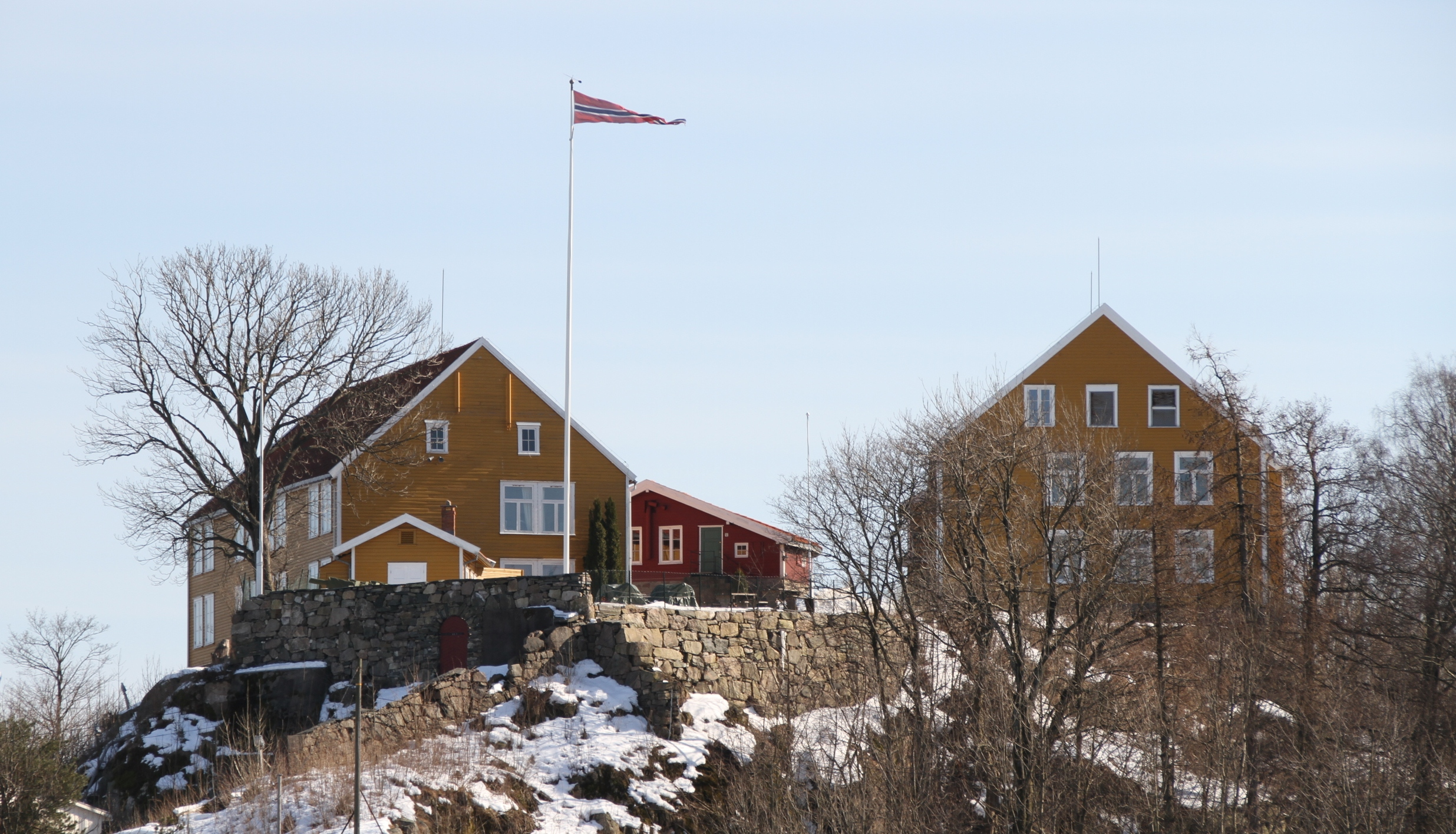
Lasaretthøyden heights

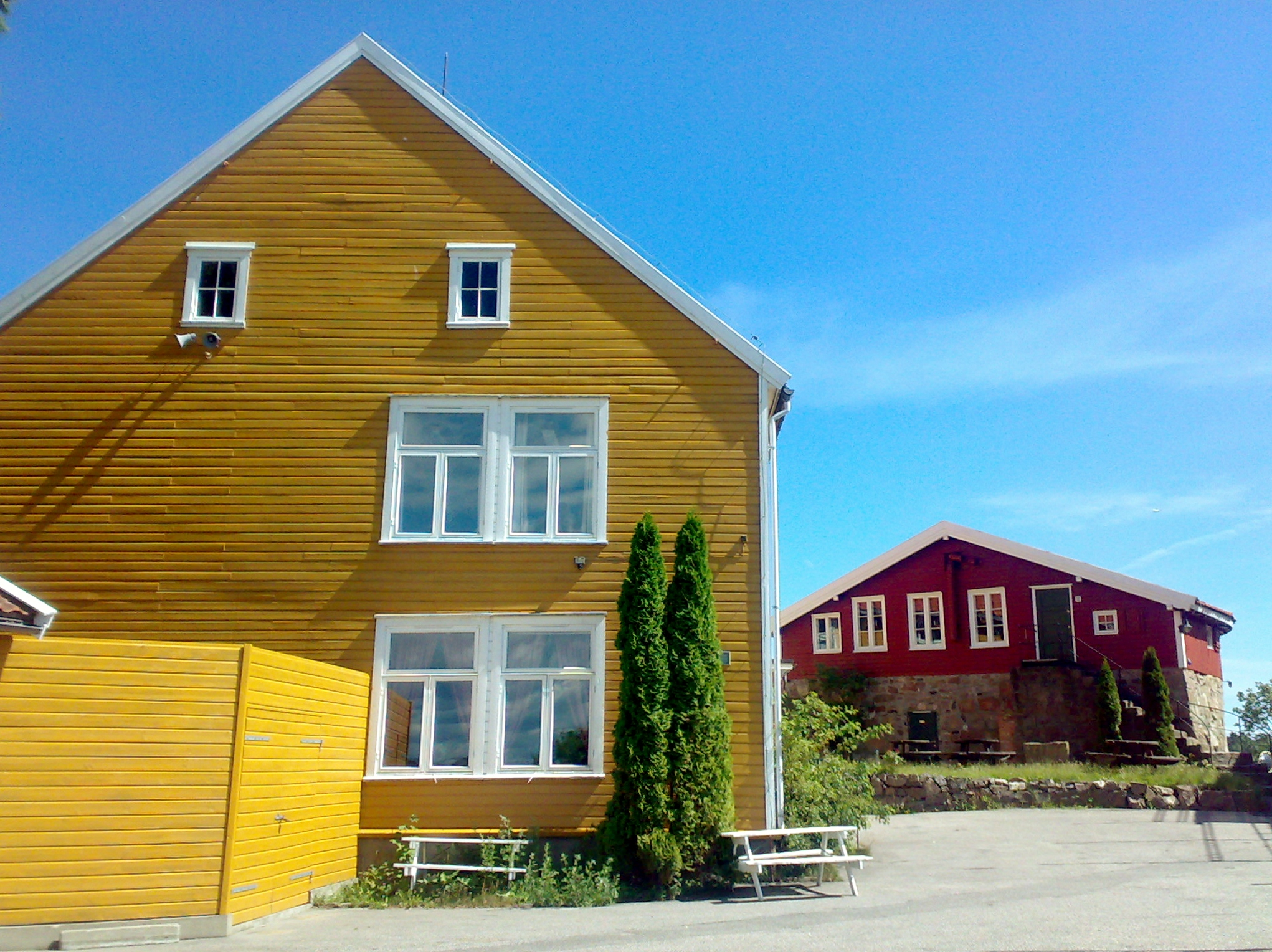
Former lazaretto buildings

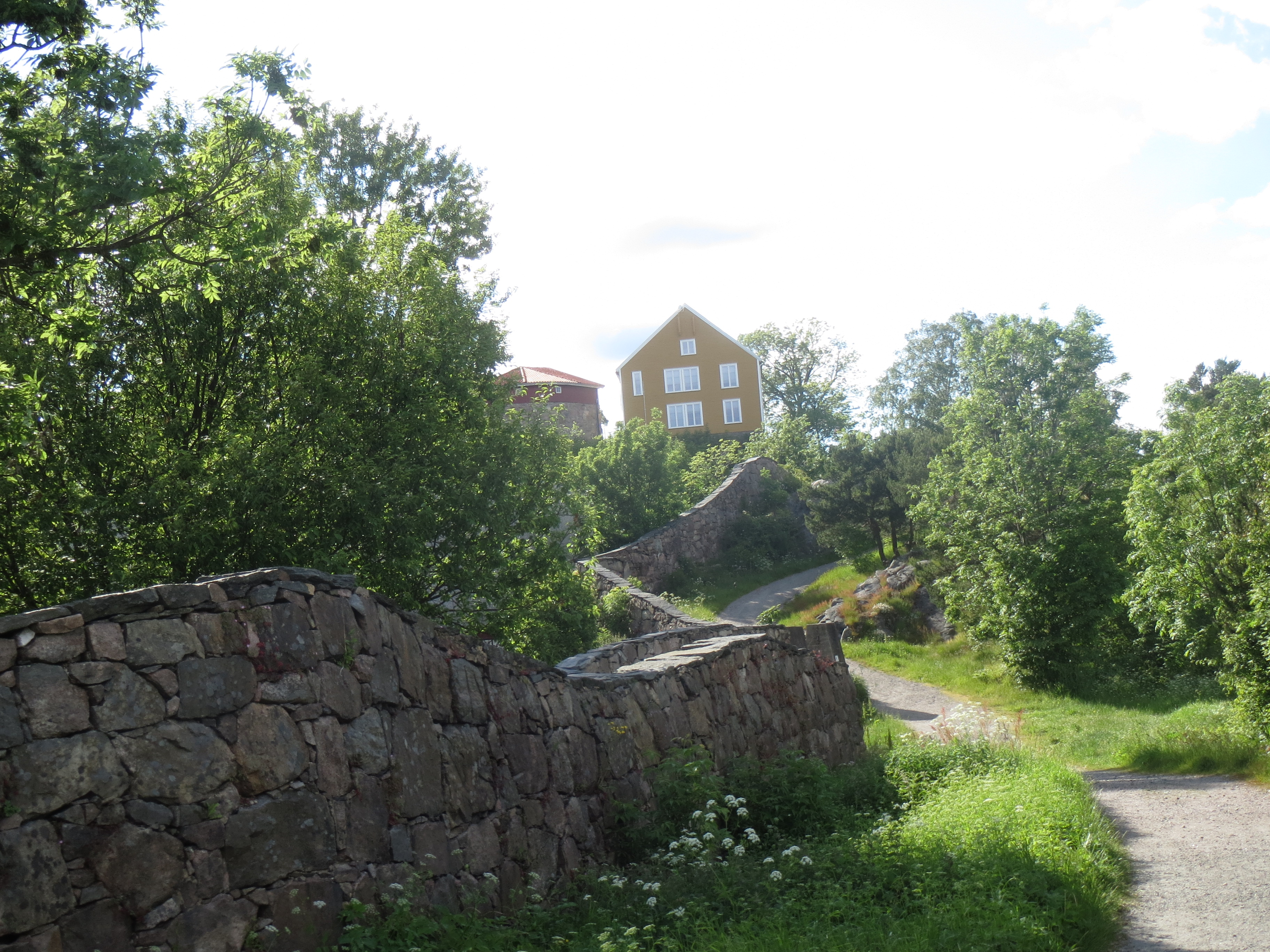
Quarantine wall I

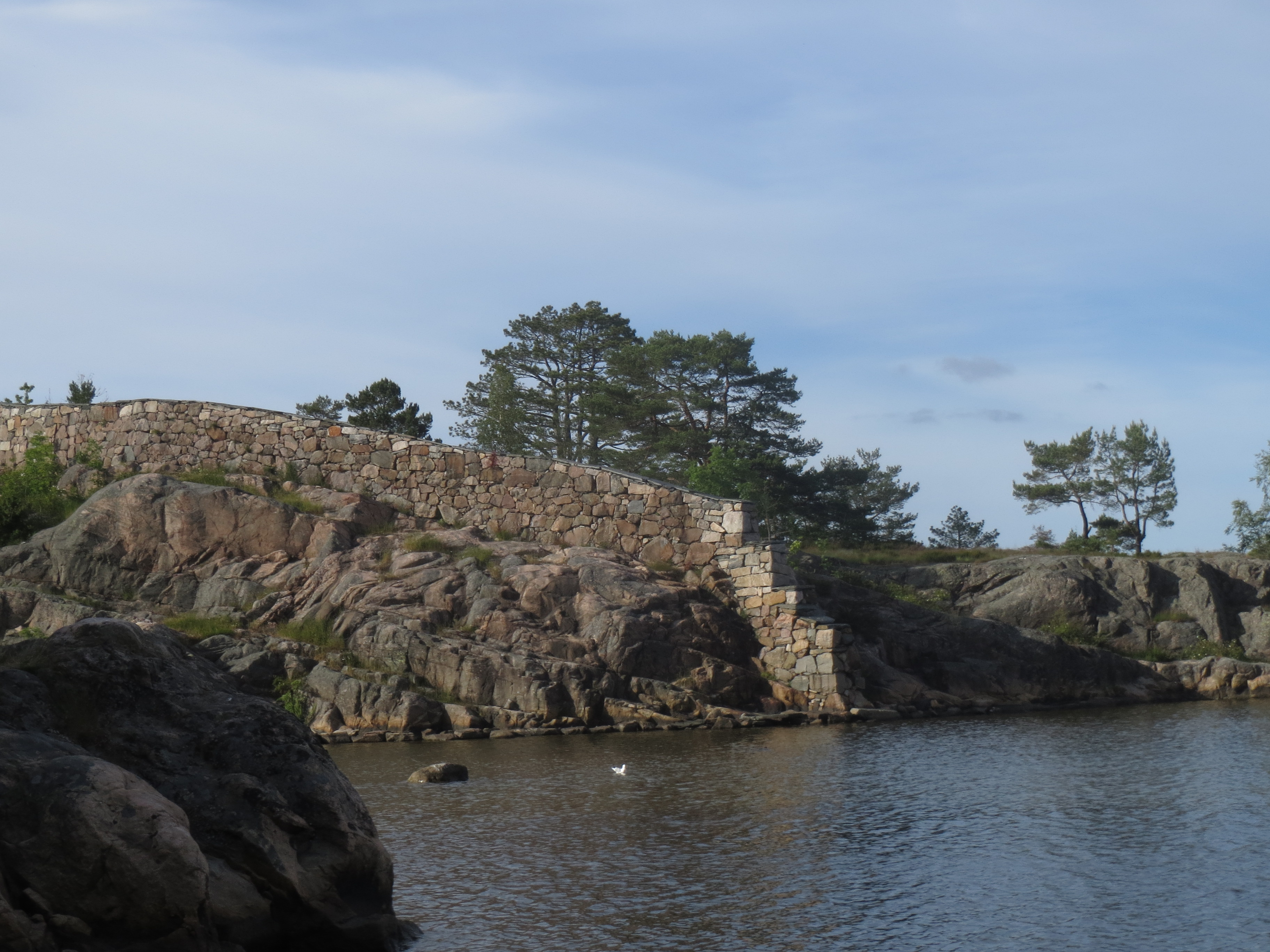
Quarantine wall II

=== Haubitz Hall ===
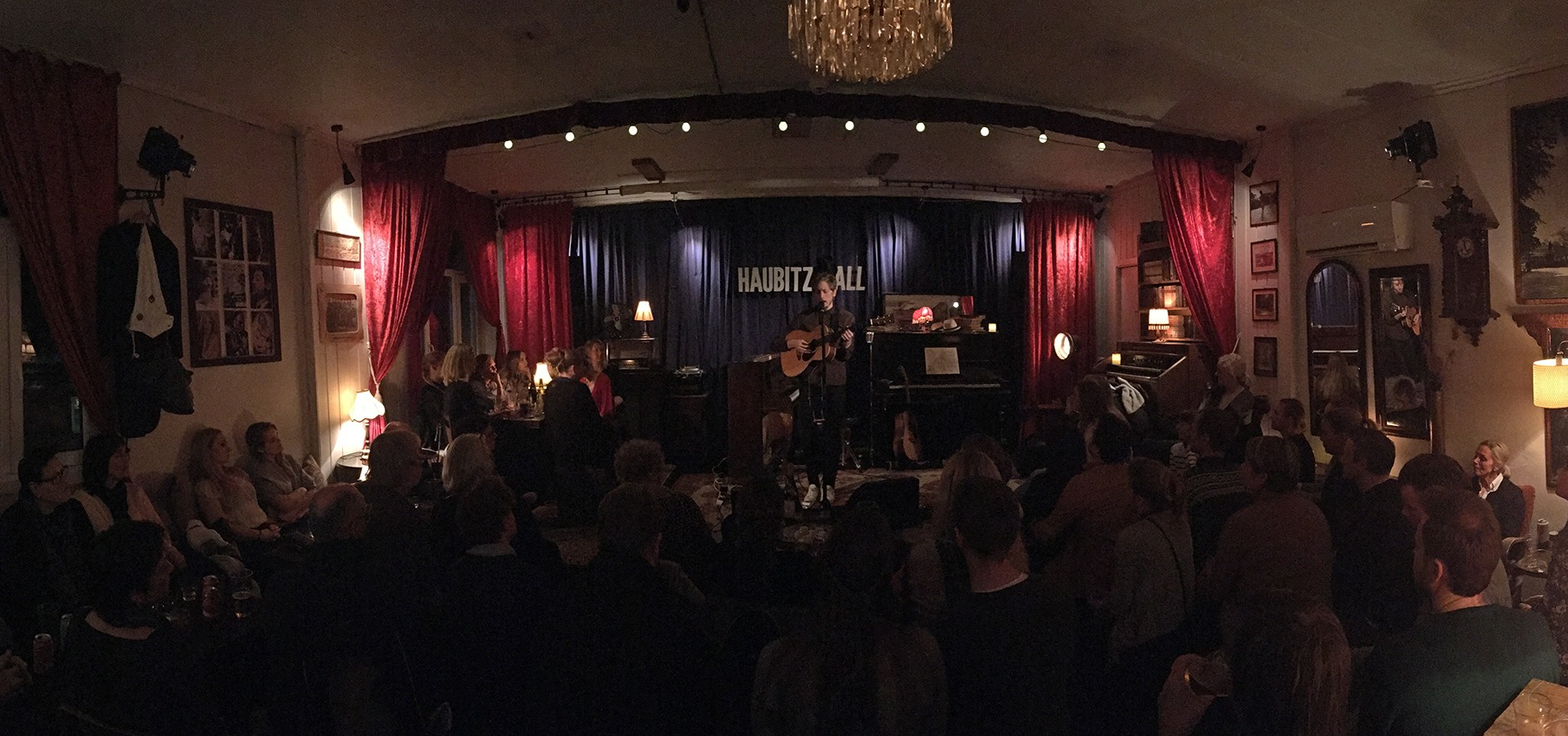
Club concert in Haubitz Hall Salongen

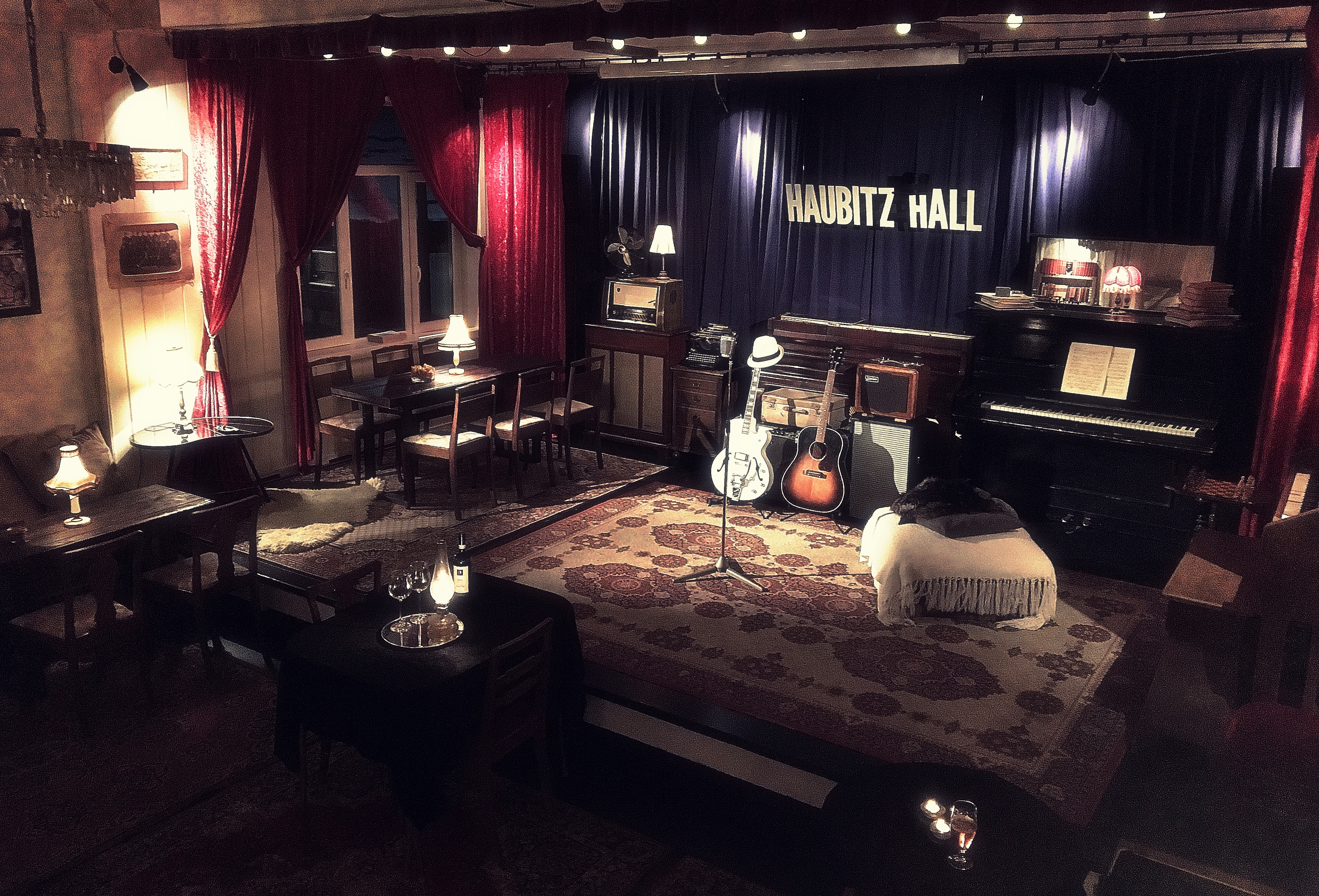
Haubitz Hall Salongen (interior)

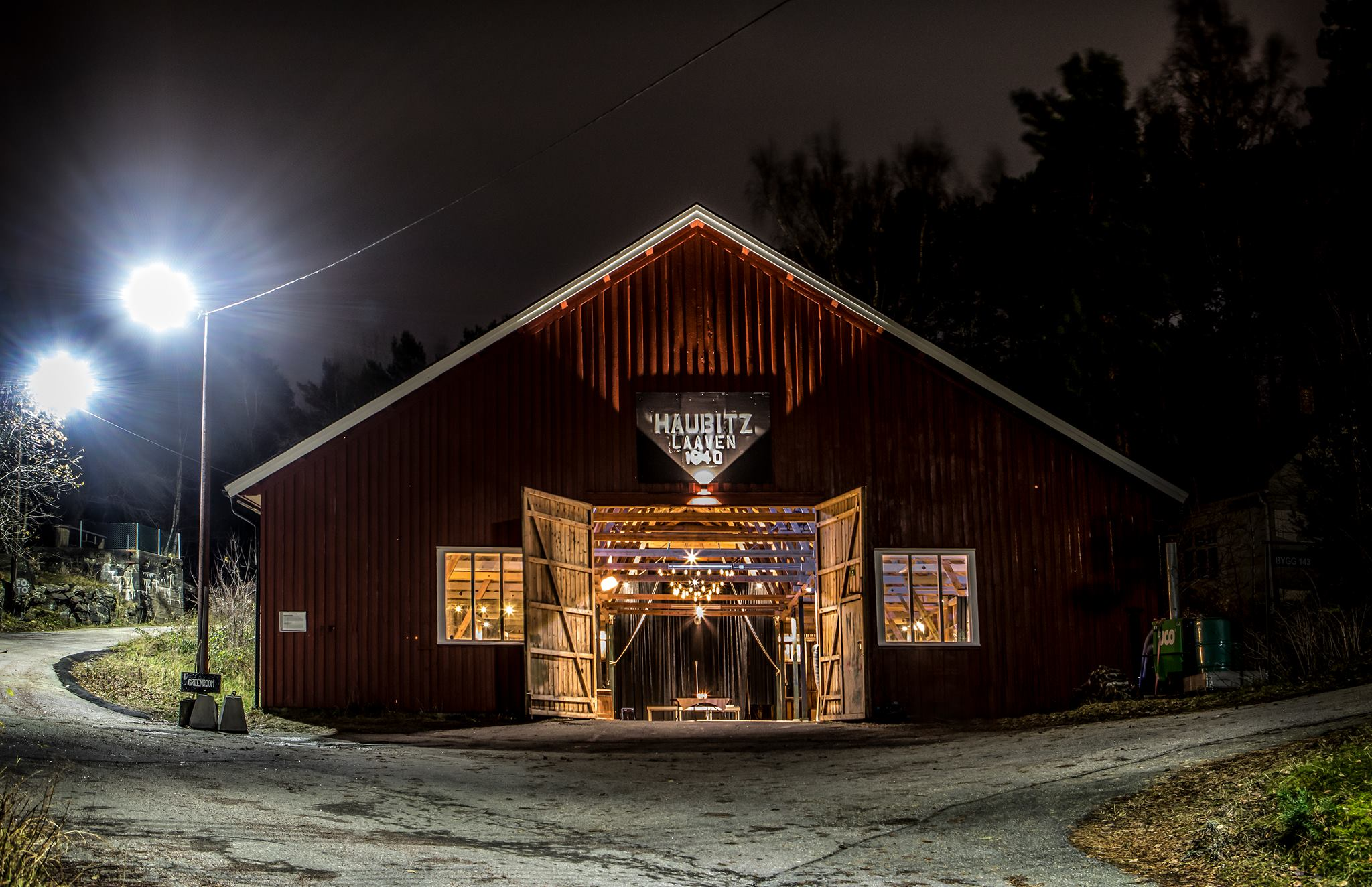
Haubitz Laaven

== See also ==
- Odderøya Lighthouse
- History of Norway
