= Fortifications of Kristiansand =

In Kristiansand, Norway, there are 4 older fortifications and 5 fortresses built around World War II, in addition to Odderøya who has both older and younger fortifications.

Fortifications around Kristiansand
Name	Picture	Location	Built
Beltevika Fortress		Flekkerøy	1941
Christiansholm		Odderøya, Kvadraturen	1672
Christiansø		Flekkerøy, Vågsbygd	1635
Fredriksholm		Flekkerøy, Vågsbygd	1662
Helgøya		Ny-Hellesund	1941
Randøya		Østre Randøya, Randesund	1941
Krossholmen		Flekkerøy	1938
Lagmannsholmen		Langmannsholmen, Kvadraturen	1686
Laksevika		Flekkerøy	1940
Møvik		Voiebyen, Vågsbygd	1941
Odderøya		Odderøya, Kvadraturen	1667; 1809; 1904; 1940
