= Flekkerøy Tunnel =

Undersea road tunnel in Norway

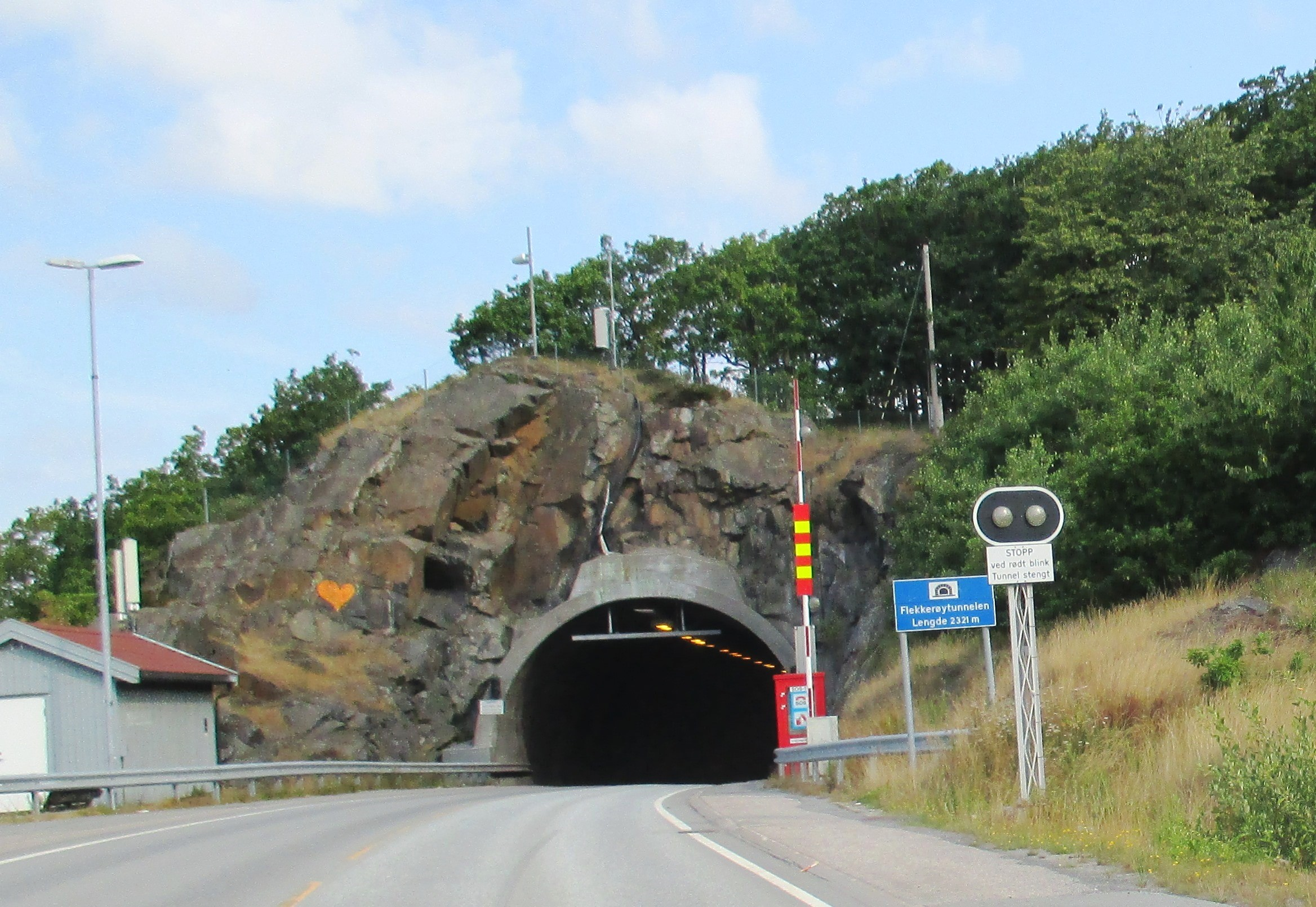
- The tunnel outlet on Flekkerøya
- Interactive map of Flekkerøy Tunnel

Overview
- Official name: Flekkerøytunnelen
- Location: Agder, Norway
- Coordinates: 58.0948°N 07.9725°E
- Route: Fv457
- Start: Kroodden
- End: Flekkerøya

Operation
- Opened: 1989
- Operator: Statens vegvesen

Technical
- Length: 2,321 m (1.44 mi)
- No. of lanes: 2
- Operating speed: 70 km/h (43 mph)
- Min elevation: 101 m (331 ft) below sea level
- Grade: 10%

The Flekkerøy Tunnel (Norwegian: Flekkerøytunnelen) is a subsea road tunnel on the county road 457 in Kristiansand Municipality in Agder county, Norway. It is the southernmost subsea tunnel in Norway. The tunnel runs under the strait between Kroodden on the mainland and the island of Flekkerøya. The tunnel is 2,321-metre (7,615 ft) long, it reaches a depth of 101 metres (331 ft) below sea level, and the maximum gradient is 10%. Construction started on the Flekkerøy tunnel on 1 August 1988. The breakthrough in the tunnel was on 6 March 1989 and the tunnel was opened on 15 August 1989. It replaced a ferry connection between Møvik in mainland Kristiansand and Lindebøkilen on the island of Flekkerøya.

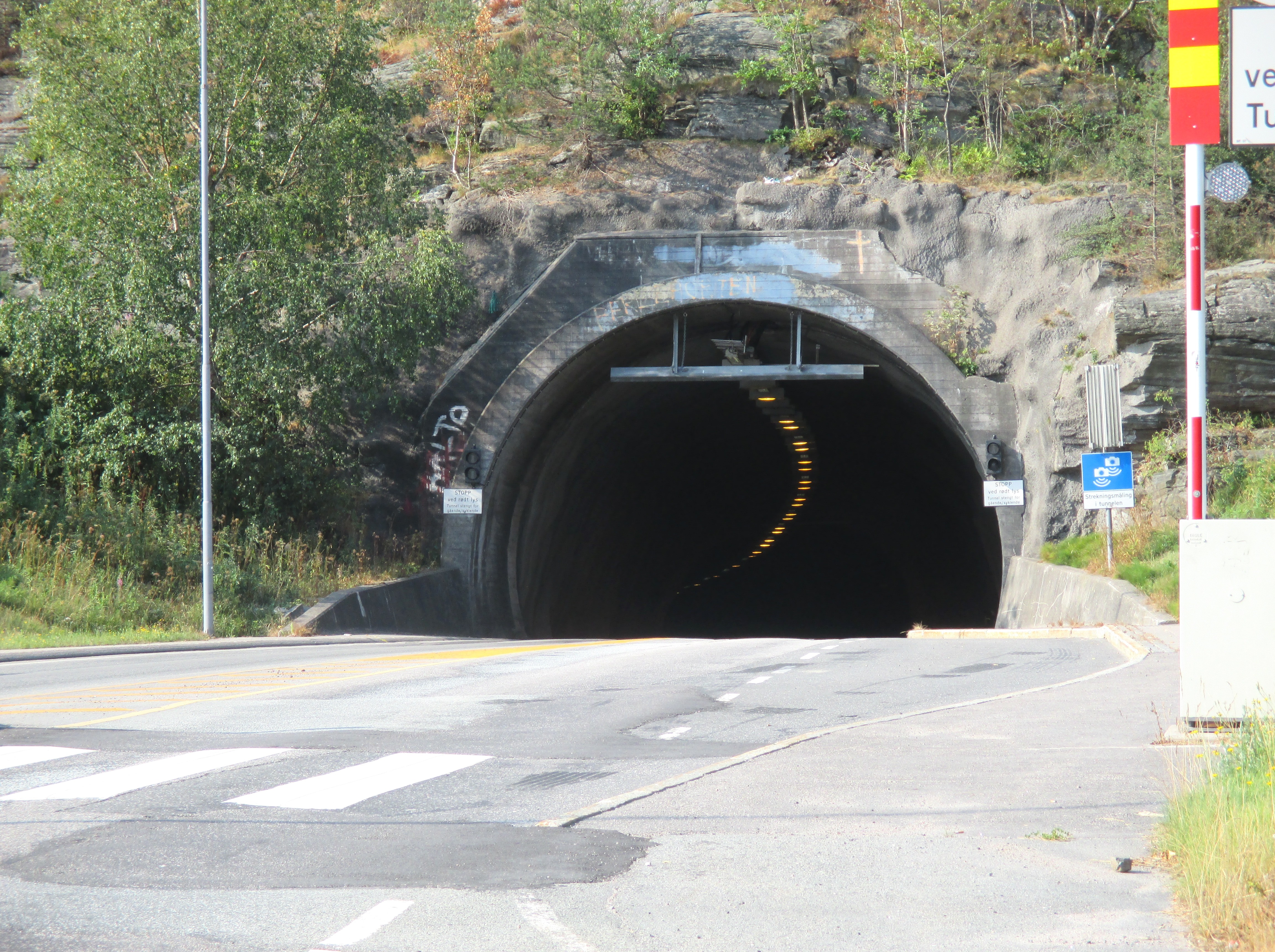
Tunnel outlet north at Kroodden

Construction costs were 87 million kr. Tolls were collected from the opening in 1989 until 14 July 1998. Fire safety in the tunnel is considered to be good.

== Speed control ==
The tunnel has a strict 70-kilometre-per-hour (43 mph) speed limit. There are an automatic speed control camera in both directions in the tunnel. After complaints during the first few years after its opening of people driving too fast, the police intensified speed traps throughout the tunnel. In the first half of 2009, the police stopped many speeders, collecting more than 3 million kr in speeding fines (which corresponds to an average of about 16,000 kr each day). They also filed 22 police reports and 30 driver's licenses were confiscated. That was despite the fact that the cameras are not activated at all times.
