= Kroodden =

Krooden
- Neighborhood in Kristiansand
- Interactive map of Krooden
- Coordinates: 58.0934°N 07.9751°E
- Country: Norway
- County: Agder
- Municipality: Kristiansand
- Borough: Vågsbygd
- District: Voiebyen
- Elevation: 8 m (26 ft)
- Time zone: UTC+01:00 (CET)
  - Summer (DST): UTC+02:00 (CEST)
- Postal code: 4624
- Area code: 38

Kroodden is a neighbourhood in the city of Kristiansand in Agder county, Norway. The neighborhood is located in the borough of Vågsbygd and in the district of Voiebyen. The Kristiansand Cannon Museum is located to the west of Kroodden. Kroodden is south of Spinneren along the coast. From Kroodden, the Flekkerøy Tunnel leads across the strait to the island of Flekkerøya.

Bus lines from Kroodden
| Line | Destination |
|---|---|
| M1 | Flekkerøy - Sørlandsparken Dyreparken - IKEA |
| M1 | Flekkerøy - Kvadraturen |
| N2 | Flekkerøy - Voiebyen - Kvadraturen |
