= Spinneren =

- Neighborhood in Kristiansand
- Interactive map of Spinneren
- Coordinates: 58.0976°N 07.9746°E
- Country: Norway
- County: Agder
- Municipality: Kristiansand
- Borough: Vågsbygd
- District: Voiebyen
- Elevation: 0 m (0 ft)
- Time zone: UTC+01:00 (CET)
  - Summer (DST): UTC+02:00 (CEST)
- Postal code: 4624
- Area code: 38

Spinneren is a neighbourhood in the city of Kristiansand in Agder county, Norway. The neighborhood is located in the borough of Vågsbygd and in the district of Voiebyen. Spinneren is located along the coast, south of Møvik and north of Kroodden.

Bus lines from Spinneren
Line	Destination
M1	Flekkerøy - Sørlandsparken Dyreparken - IKEA
M1	Flekkerøy - Kvadraturen
N2	Flekkerøy - Voiebyen - Kvadraturen
