= Christiansø Fortress =

Historic Norwegian fortress

Christiansø festning
- Kristiansand, Norway

Site information
- Type: Fortress
- Controlled by: Norway

Location
- Coordinates: 58°05′08″N 7°59′02″E

Site history
- Built: 1635
- In use: 1635-1658, 1848-1871

Garrison information
- Past commanders: Jørgen Bjelke

Christiansø Fortress is one of the historic Norwegian fortresses, which commands the western approaches to Flekkerøy harbor, just outside the present-day city of Kristiansand in Kristiansand Municipality in Agder county, Norway. The fortress was located on the small Slottsholmen island (now called Gammeløen or old island), just north of the large island of Flekkerøya.

== History ==
In the early 17th century, the struggle between the Netherlands Navy and the Dunkirk pirates had spread into the Norwegian coastal waters in Sørlandet (southern Norway).

In June 1635, King Christian IV of Denmark-Norway was in his vessel which lay at anchor at Flekkerøy harbor. While there, he ordered construction of a naval base and Christiansø Fortress on small Slottsholmen island (now called Gammeløen or old island). The island commands the western approaches to Flekkerøy harbor, a port that was long frequented by ships of many nations. The town of Kristiansand was founded near there in 1641 to strengthen control of the area.

King Christian IV again visited Flekkerøy in 1644 during the Hannibal War.

While the Dutch-English war (1652–1654) was being fought Jørgen Bjelke was named lord of the region and commander of Christiansø Fortress to strengthen the defenses in the event that Oliver Cromwell's forces should attempt to seize it to prey on the extensive Dutch-Norwegian trade. Bjelke was later to play a major role in the Northern War.

Construction on the fortress was never completed. When the danger from Cromwell ceased, this fort was abandoned and replaced by the more strategically located Fredriksholm Fortress, which commanded both approaches to the harbor, in 1658.

The focus of defense moved to the town of Kristiansand in 1672, with the Christiansholm Fortress, much of which still survives.

During the Dano-German War of 1848 and through the Crimean War the forts at Christiansø and Fredriksholm were returned to service. The two islands were evacuated and the fortifications closed in 1871.

Although centuries old, the fortresses at Flekkerøy did not see combat until the German invasion on the 9th of April, 1940.
