= HDMS Prinds Christian Frederik =

Ship

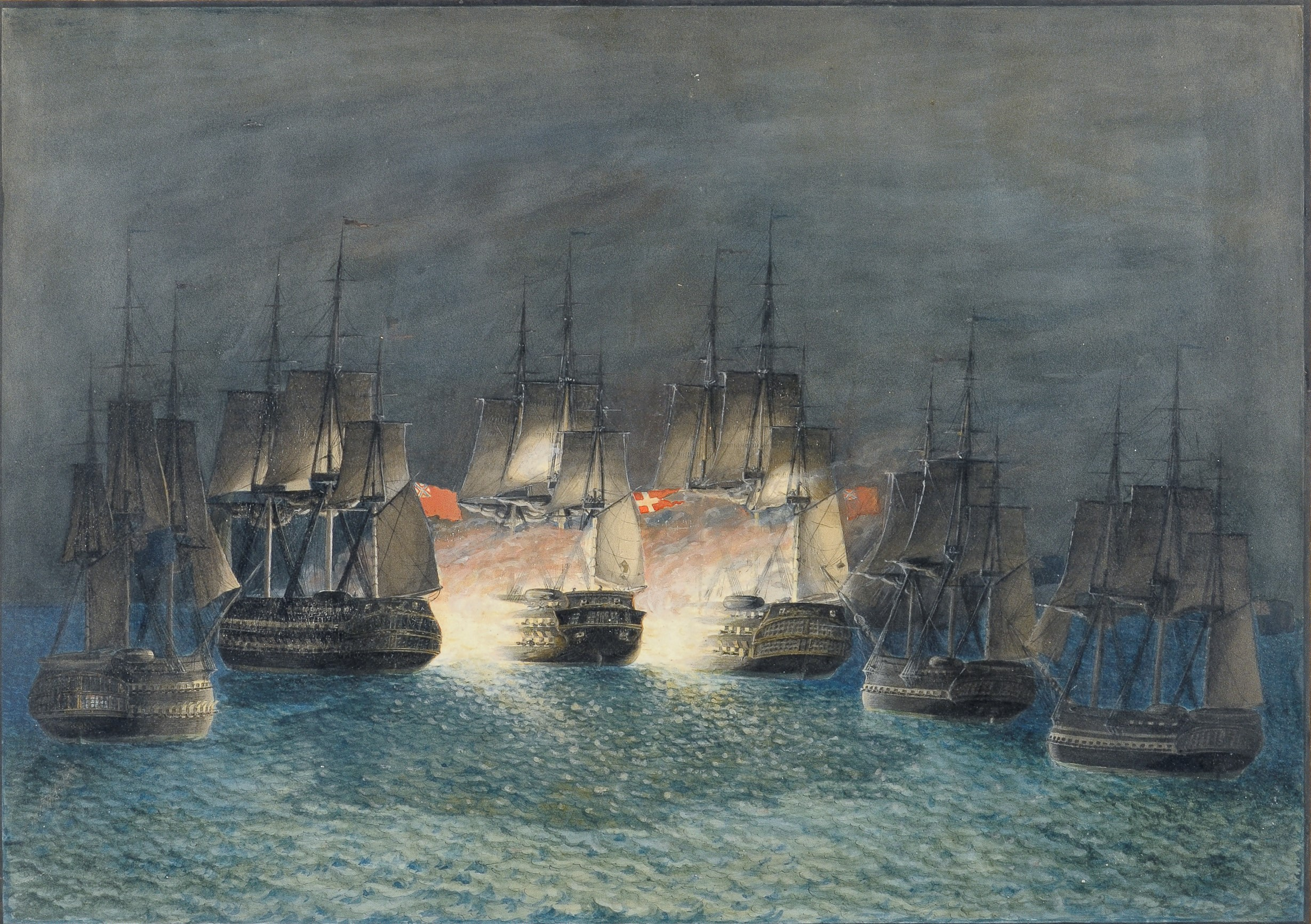
- HDMS Prinds Christian Frederik is in the middle. (Motif from the Battle of Zealand Point)

History

Denmark-Norway
- Name: HMS Prinds Christian Frederik
- Namesake: Prince Christian Frederick
- Builder: Hohlenberg, Orlogsværftet, Nyholm, Copenhagen
- Launched: 6 October 1804
- In service: 1806
- Out of service: 21 March 1808
- Fate: Captured and destroyed by the Royal Navy

General characteristics
- Class & type: 74-gun third-rate ship of the line
- Tons burthen: 2.345 (bm)
- Length: 53.6 m (176 ft)
- Beam: 13.9 m (46 ft)
- Depth of hold: 6.35 m (20.8 ft)
- Sail plan: Full-rigged ship
- Crew: until 628
- Armament: Lower gundeck: 28 × 24-pounder guns; Upper gundeck: 28 × 18-pounder guns; QD: 18 × 8-pounder guns

HDMS Prinds Christian Frederik was a ship of the line in the Royal Dano-Norwegian Navy.

== Construction ==
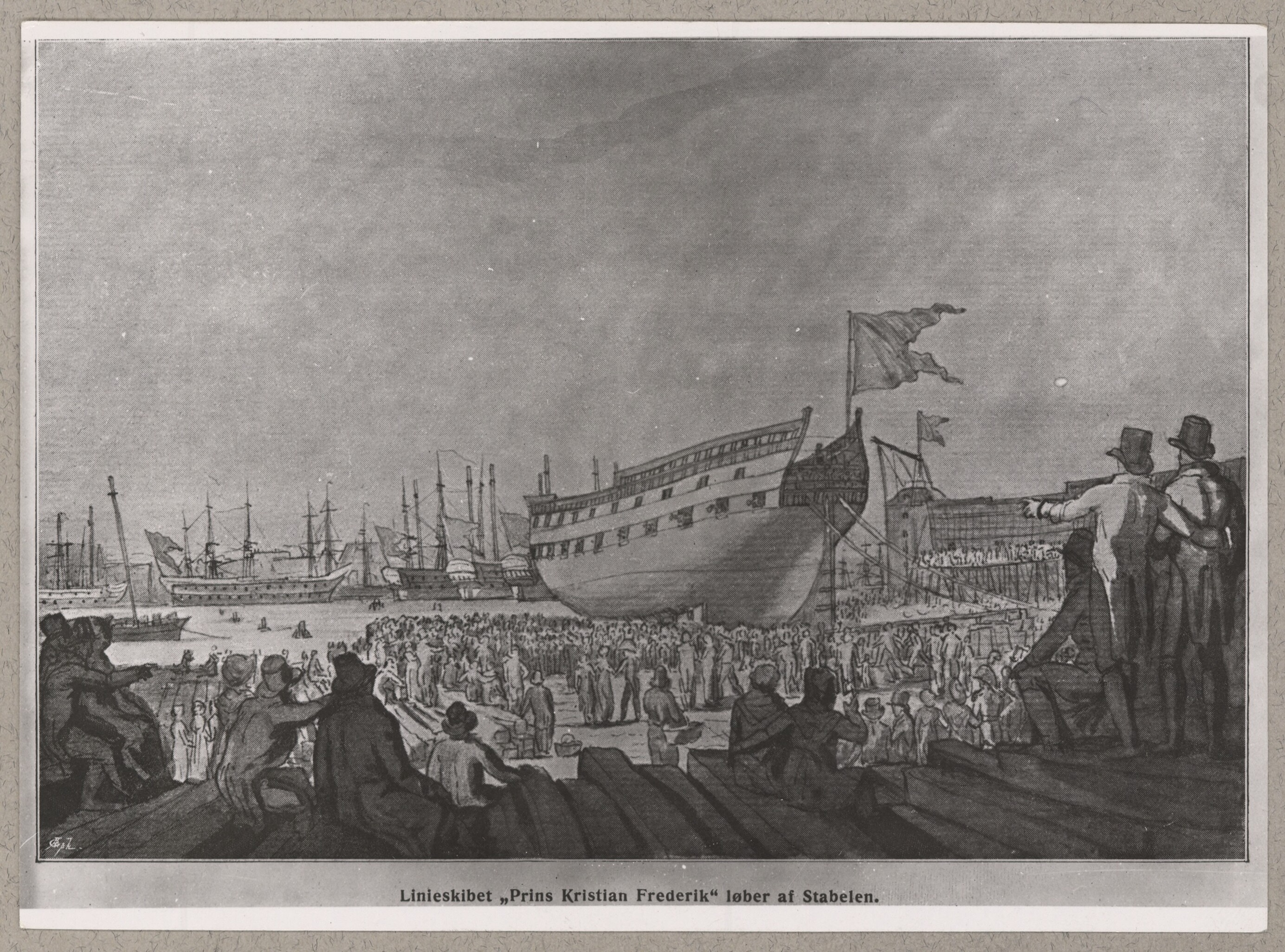
C. W. Rckersberg: HDMN Prinds Christian Frederik is launched from Oræosværftet in Copenhagen, 1804.

The ship was built at Orlogsværftet on the islet of Nyholm off Copenhagen. It was designed by Frantz Hohlenberg. 1,600 oak trees were used in the construction of the ship. It was launched on 6 October 1804. (Note: five technical drawings of this ship are available on-line at the Danish Naval Museum website (click vis)) The construction cost was approximately 12,000 rigsdaler.

== Service ==
In 1806 and parts of the following year, the ship operated as a training vessel in the North Sea and the Baltic Sea.

In the second half of 1807 the HDMS Prinds Christian Frederik was patrolling in Danish-Norwegian waters alongside the ship of the line HDMS Lovise Augusta. On September 18, a Royal Navy squadron under Robert Stopford approached Kristiansand's eastern harbour intending on capturing Prinds Christian Fredrik, which was anchored there. After receiving fire from the Christiansholm Fortress, Stopford's squadron instead sailed to the disused Fredriksholm Fortress and slighted the fortress by blowing it up.

At the beginning of 1808, HDMS Prinds Christian Frederik was in Norway to carry supplies to the Royal Dano-Norwegian Army. Despite illness aboard, and with a large part of the crew newly replaced, the ship was ordered in March to protect the transfer of troops over the Great Belt (Storebælt).

On March 21, the ship was captured by a major British naval force during the Battle of Zealand Point, where she suffered 64 killed and 126 wounded in action; during the battle, she ran aground.

On March 23, the captured HMS Prinds Christian Frederik remained firmly aground despite British efforts to refloat it. After they had removed all the dead and wounded aboard the ship, the British decided to set fire to the immobile hulk instead upon realizing they were unable to move it. It blew up when the fire reached the ship's powder magazine, destroying the last Danish-Norwegian ship of the line in the Napoleonic Wars.

== Commemoration ==
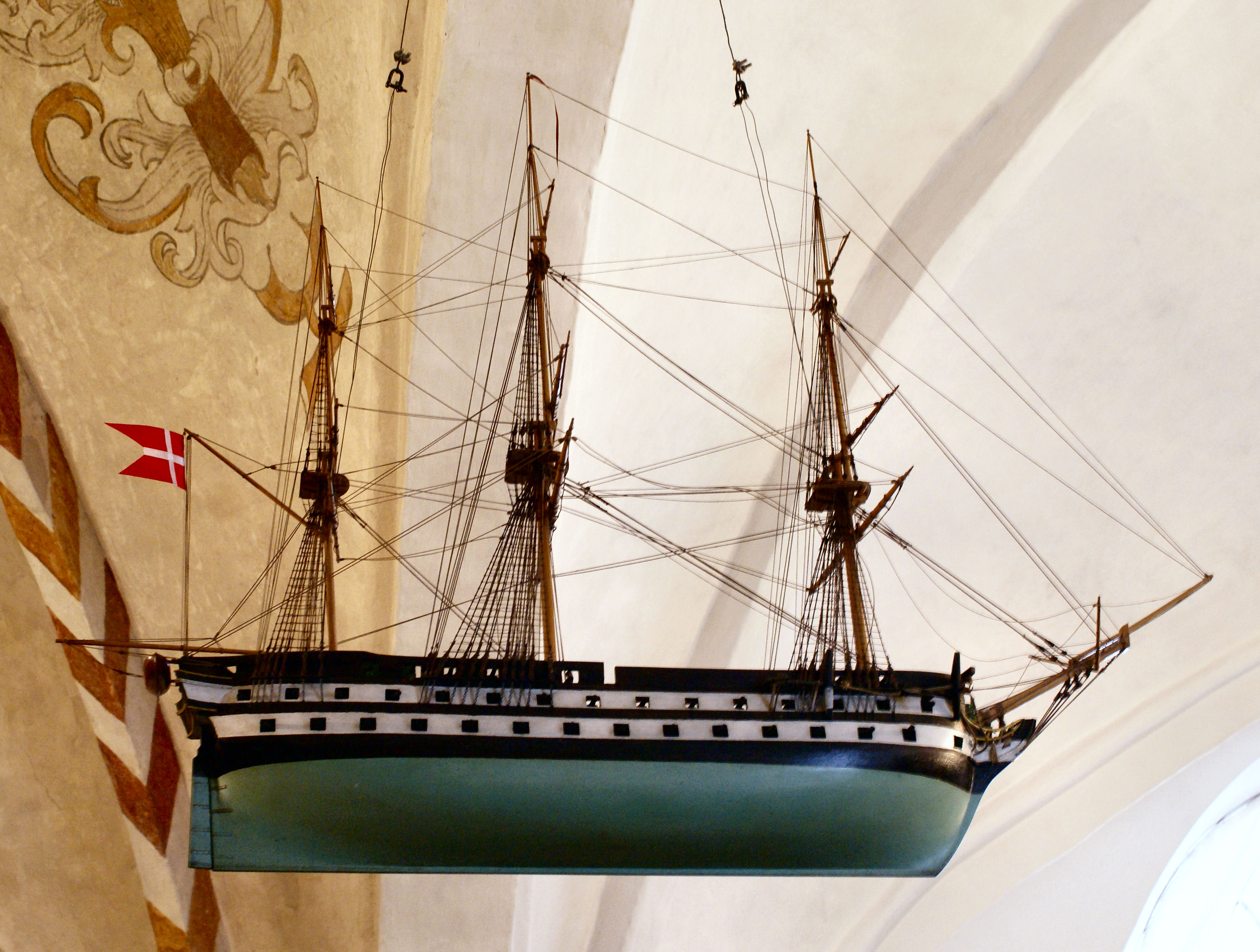
The model of Prinds Christian Frederik in Odden Church

The anchor was for many years placed outside Stenstrup Museum. It was in 2002 moved to a new location in front of Annebjerggård. In 2021, it was moved to a barn where it will be restored. The anchor, a canon and a number of other artefacts from the ship will later be part of a new display about the Battle of Zealand in Odsherred Museum.

A model of this ship hangs in Odden Church, near the scene of the Battle of Zealand Point.

From 2023 to 2024, Odsherred Museum held a special exhibition about Willemoes and the Wreck.
