= Møvik =

Møvik Møvig
- Neighborhood in Kristiansand
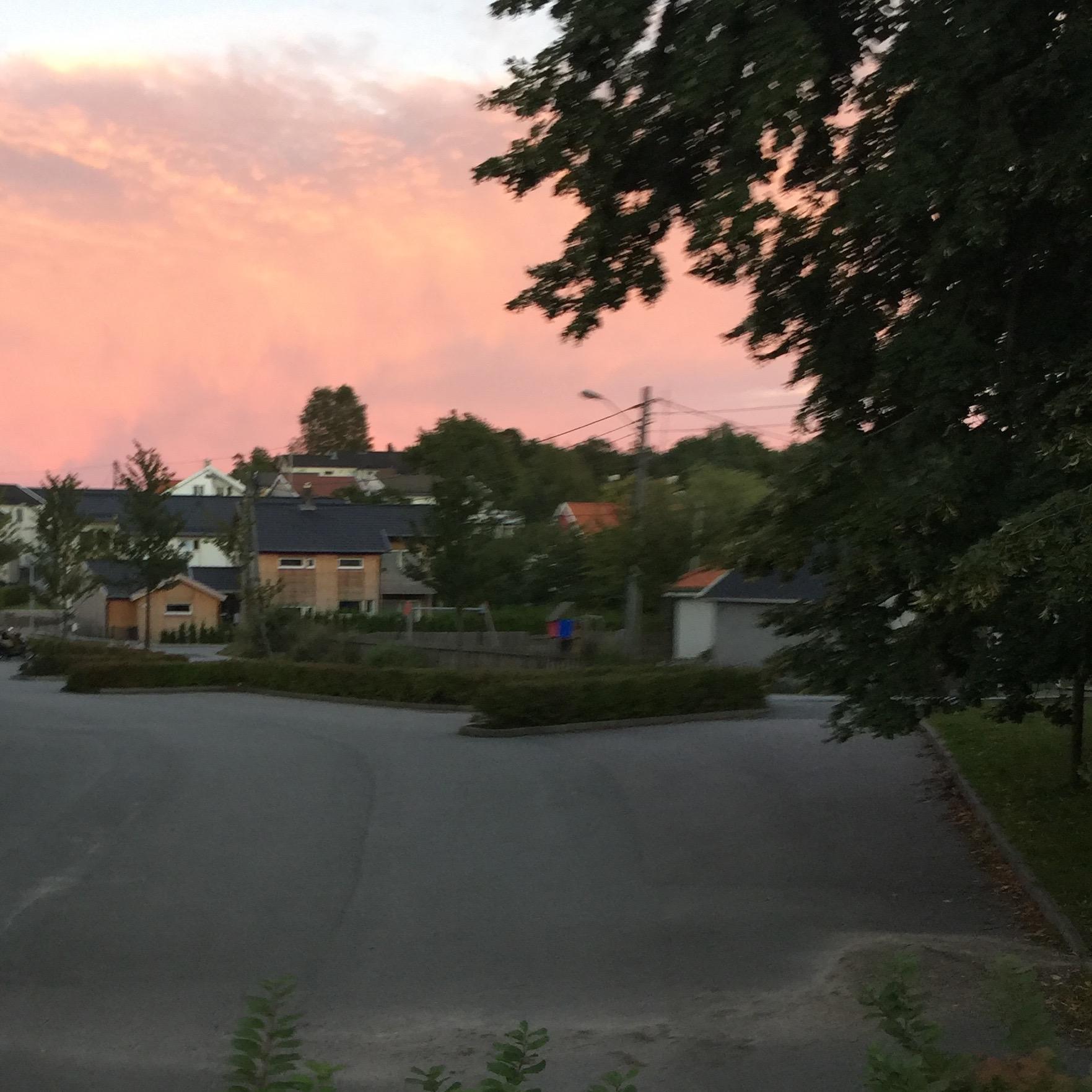
- View of the neighborhood
- Interactive map of Møvik
- Coordinates: 58.1040°N 07.9738°E
- Country: Norway
- County: Agder
- Municipality: Kristiansand
- Borough: Vågsbygd
- District: Voiebyen
- Elevation: 10 m (33 ft)
- Time zone: UTC+01:00 (CET)
  - Summer (DST): UTC+02:00 (CEST)
- Postal code: 4623
- Area code: 38

Møvik is a neighbourhood in the city of Kristiansand in Agder county, Norway. The neighborhood is located in the borough of Vågsbygd and in the district of Voiebyen. It's located in the southeast part of the borough along the shore. It lies north of Spinneren and Krooden, southwest of Ternevig, and south of Voie.

Møvik has the only junior high for the district of Voiebyen. The Kristiansand Cannon Museum is located in the hills south of Møvik, near the Møvik fortress.

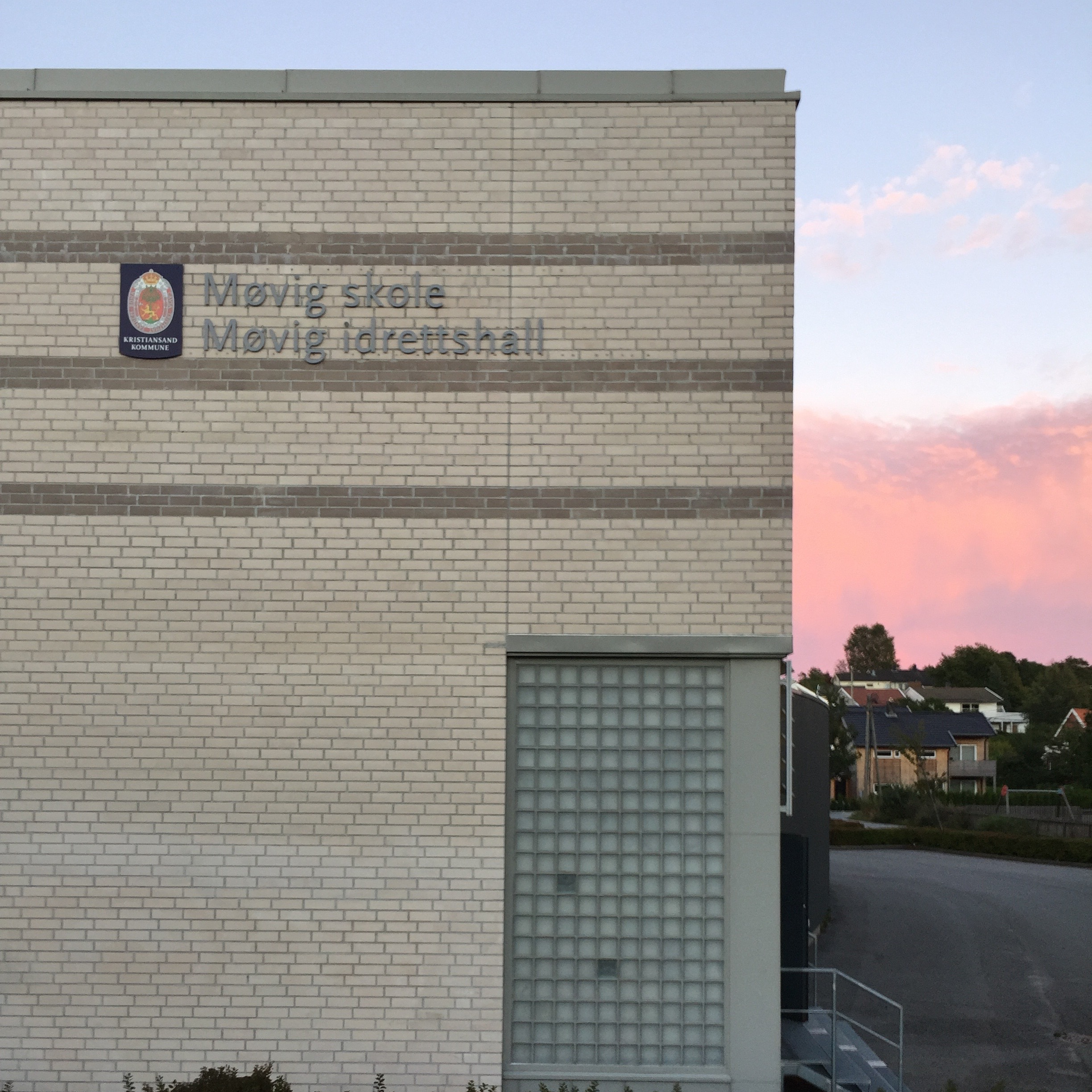
Møvig Junior High
