= Fredriksholm Fortress =

Building in Kristiansand, Norway

Coordinates: 58.0964°N 7.98279°E

Fredriksholm festning Fredriksholm Fortress
- Kristiansand, Norway
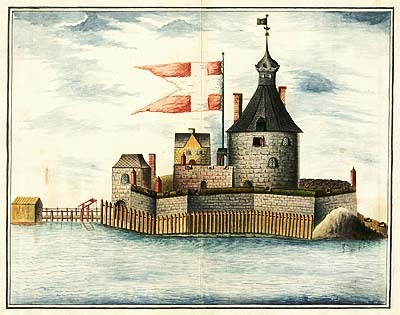
- Fredriksholm Fortress (1756)

Site information
- Type: Fortress
- Controlled by: Denmark-Norway (1662–1814); Swedish-Norwegian Union (1814–1874)

Site history
- Built: 1662
- In use: 1662-1804, 1808-1874
- Battles/wars: British raid on 18. September 1807

Fredriksholm Fortress (Norwegian: Fredriksholm festning) was situated on an islet off Kristiansand, Norway. Today the former fortress is in ruins and the site is a popular place for sightseeing.

== Complex ==
Fredriksholm Fortress was located 1 kilometre (0.62 mi) north of the precursor, Christiansø Fortress on Gammeløya. Both fortresses were built to protect the port of Flekkerøy. The construction of Frederiksholm Fortress was begun in 1655. After the fort Christiansø was abandoned on 1 May 1658, the stones, building materials and other useful material were transferred to Fredriksholm. The new fortress was completed in 1662. It is named after Frederick III of Denmark.

The fortress was divided into a lower and an upper part. The lower part was a wall that followed the shoreline. The upper part had a tower with a cupola and 2 artillery batteryes. The tower was the residence of the commander, and this was also the royal chambers. Otherwise, there were a number of large and small houses in the Fort area. Fortress walls were of stone, covered outside with turf and palisade. The peat was taken from a cemetery wall in such large quantities that the coffins were almost uncovered. Within the wall there was a gallery. When the fortress was completed, consisted the luminaire of 14 cannons on the lower part and 10 guns on the upper.

The fortress was originally armed with 24 guns from 2-to 34 pounds. In 1700 the fortress was at its largest, armed with 50 cannons. Garrison was in 1658 on the 24 man. The strength of the fortress, however, varied depending on the threat of war and the season. It could be up to 110 men at the castle during the summer, while there were around 30 in winter. Fredriksholm was timed to be able to accommodate 300 men.

On the mainland in the north was in 1808–1809 built a defense battery which had the task to cover the land by Fredriksholm. The area known as Batteriodden. Batteriodden was staffed with 96 infantry and 48 artillerymen. The battery was abandoned around 1850.

== Destruction ==
In 1804 the castle was abandoned. Kristiansand had become more important and more recent and important military facilities, including Christiansholm Fortress and Lagmannsholmen, which was built over four kilometers further up the fjord to protect the city and harbor.

== British attack ==
During the English Wars, three Royal Navy ships led by HMS Spencer arrived off Kristiansand. After the Battle of Copenhagen, the only remaining ship of the line of the Royal Dano-Norwegian Navy was the 70-gun HDMS Prinds Christian Frederik, which was lying at anchor in Kristiansand's eastern harbour. Spencer's captain Robert Stopford had earlier sent a letter to the Kristiansand authorities informing them that he had orders to capture Prinds Christian Frederik and threatened to bombard the city if the ship was not handed over. When Stopford's squadron approached, they were subject to heavy bombardment from Christiansholm Fortress, and the British proceeded to instead sail to the disused Fredriksholm Fortress, which they slighted by blowing it up. Four British servicemen were killed in the explosion after they went to check on the powder barrels' fuses. The fortress was partially repaired in 1808, and was then closed down for good in 1874.

== Amundsen's South Pole expedition ==
When Roald Amundsen set out on the expedition to the South Pole in 1910, Flekkerøy harbor was last stop in Norway before departure. At the fortress Fredriksholm nearly a hundred Greenland Dogs stayed in anticipation of getting on board the Amundsen's ship Fram. 98 dogs (two had died along the way) arrived at Fredriksholm from Greenland on board the steamer Hans Egede on 4 July 1910. The dogs had been brought from Greenland to Kristiansand for their health to be checked by the State Veterinarian (Stats Dyrlegen), Christopher Juell. The dogs were at Fredriksholm for a little over a month, until 9 August, when they were brought aboard the Fram at the start of Amundsen's South Pole expedition.

== Gallery ==
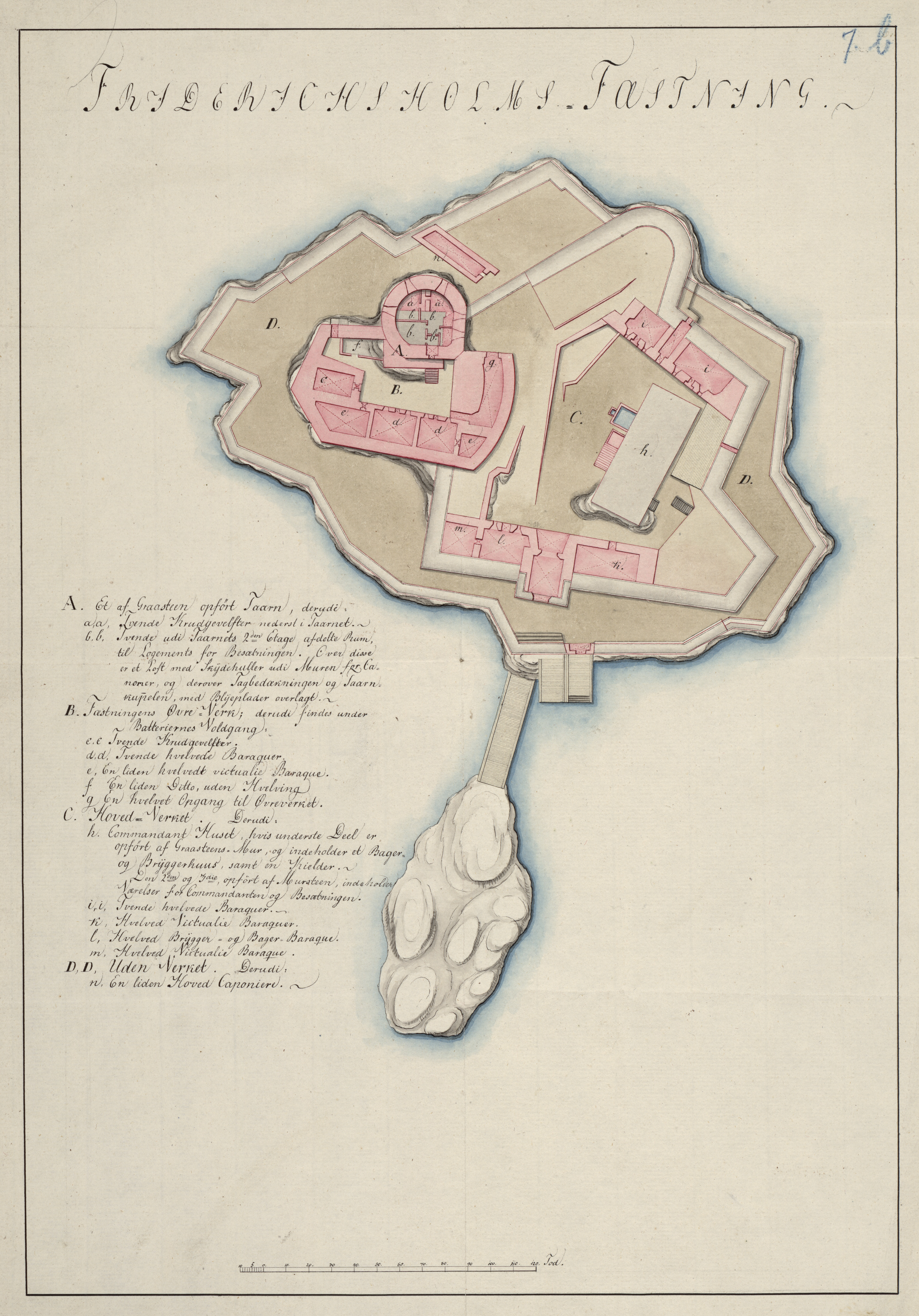
Map of Fredriksholm Fortress drawn around 1800.

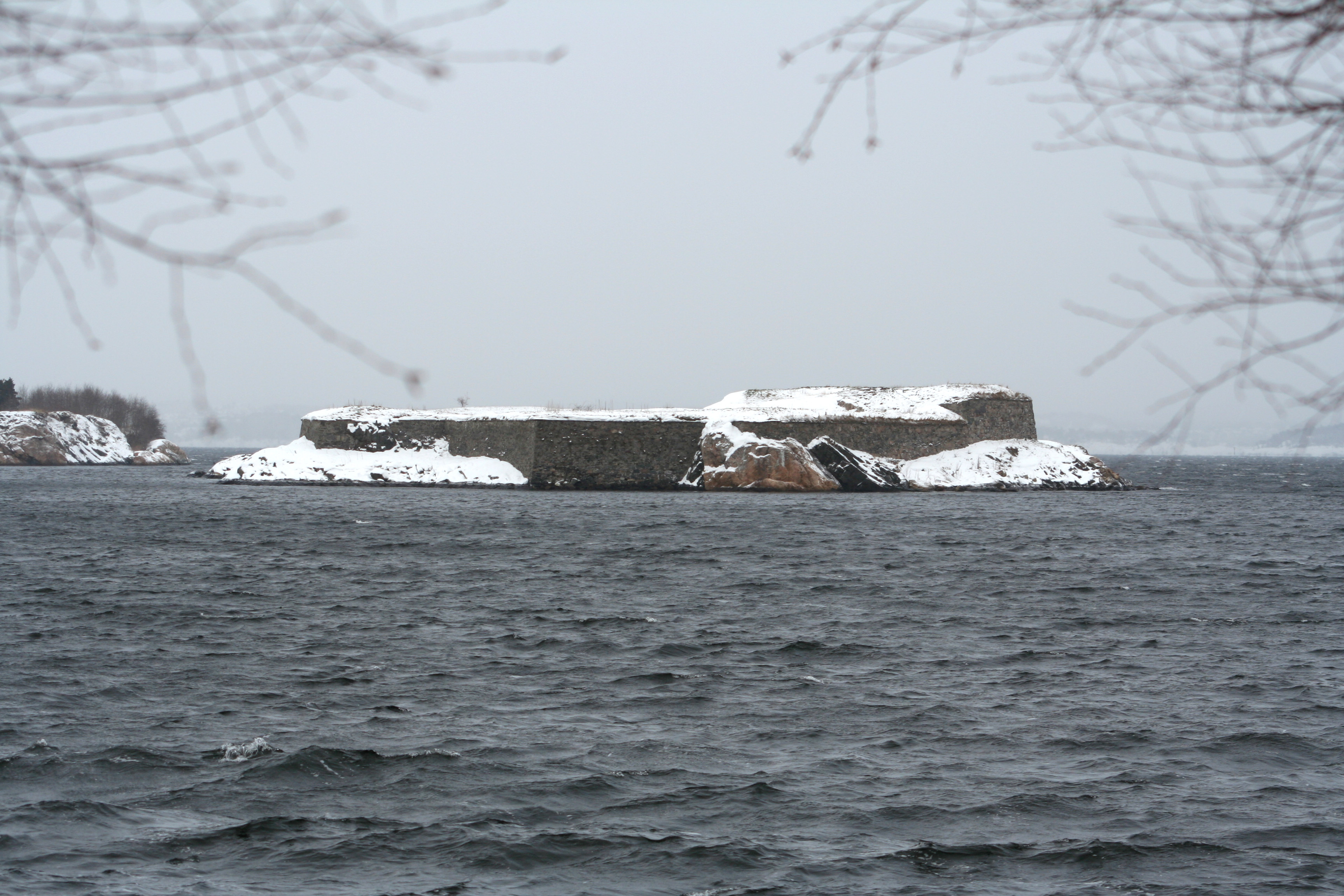
The remains of the fortress seen from west (winter 2006). Batteriodden on the mainland in the background to the left.

== Literature ==
- Helland-Hansen, Kjeld (1957). Fredriksholm Festning (in Norwegian). Oddernes kommune.
- Fjørtoft, Jan Egil (1985). Kanonene ved Skagerak (in Norwegian). Agdin Forlag.
- Hauschild Fredriksen, Karl (2007). Hærens Artilleri i Kristiansandsområdet 1556–1995 (in Norwegian).
