= Christiansholm Fortress =

Norwegian fortress

- Kristiansand, Norway
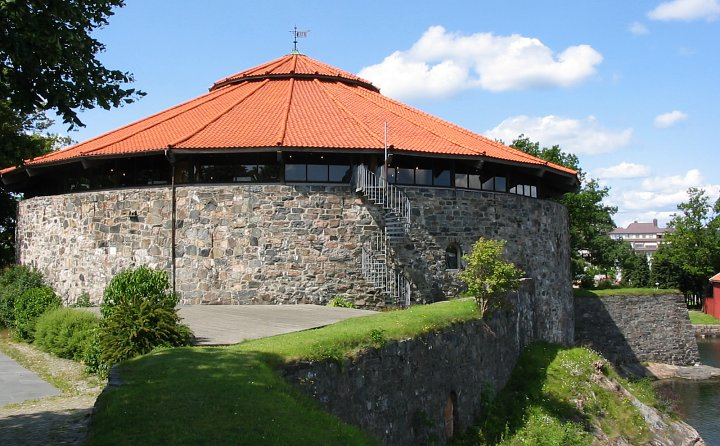
- Portion of the fortress featuring the tower.

Site information
- Controlled by: Norway

Location
- Coordinates: 58°08′39″N 8°00′13″E

Site history
- Built: 1672
- In use: 1672-1872
- Battles/wars: Attempted British raid in 1807.

Christiansholm Fortress (Norwegian: Christiansholm festning) was a Norwegian fortress built to defend the city of Kristiansand (historically spelled Christianssand).

== Background ==
The fortress was finished in 1672 and formed a part of King Christian IV's plan for defense of Christianssand when the city was founded in 1641. The architect of the fortress was quartermaster general Willem Coucheron. It was built on an islet, about 100 yards from shore. Today the fortress is connected to the mainland.

The only time the fortress was involved in active conflict was against a Royal Navy squadron led by HMS Spencer on 18 September 1807 during the English Wars. After the Battle of Copenhagen, the only remaining ship of the line of the Royal Dano-Norwegian Navy was the 70-gun HDMS Prinds Christian Frederik, which was lying at anchor in Kristiansand's eastern harbour. Spencer's captain Robert Stopford sent a letter to the Kristiansand authorities informing them that he had orders to capture Prinds Christian Frederik and threatened to bombard the city if the ship was not handed over. When Stopford's squadron approached, they were subject to heavy bombardment from Christiansholm Fortress, and the British proceeded to instead sail to the disused Fredriksholm Fortress, which they slighted by blowing it up. Four British servicemen were killed in the explosion after they went to check on the powder barrels' fuses.

The fortress was decommissioned by royal decree during June 1872 as part of a major redevelopment of fortifications across the nation. Today, Christiansholm is a tourist attraction by the Kristiansand Boardwalk and venue for a variety of cultural events and festivities. It is now owned by the municipality and is a site used principally for recreation and cultural events.

== Gallery ==
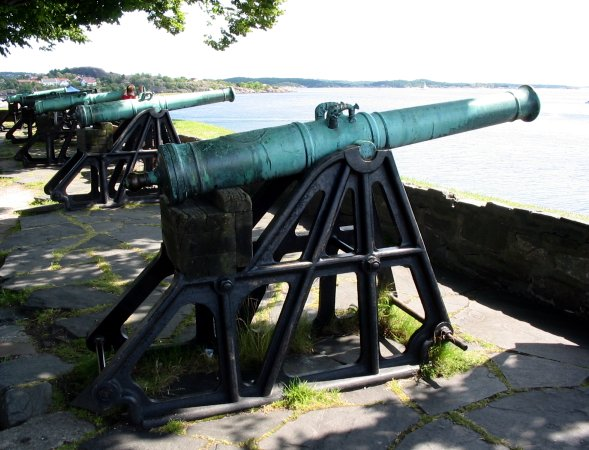
Cannons at Christiansholm Fortress

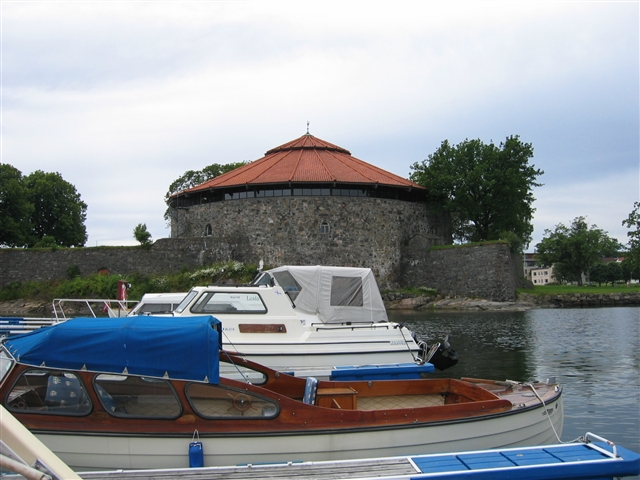
Christiansholm Festning and harbor

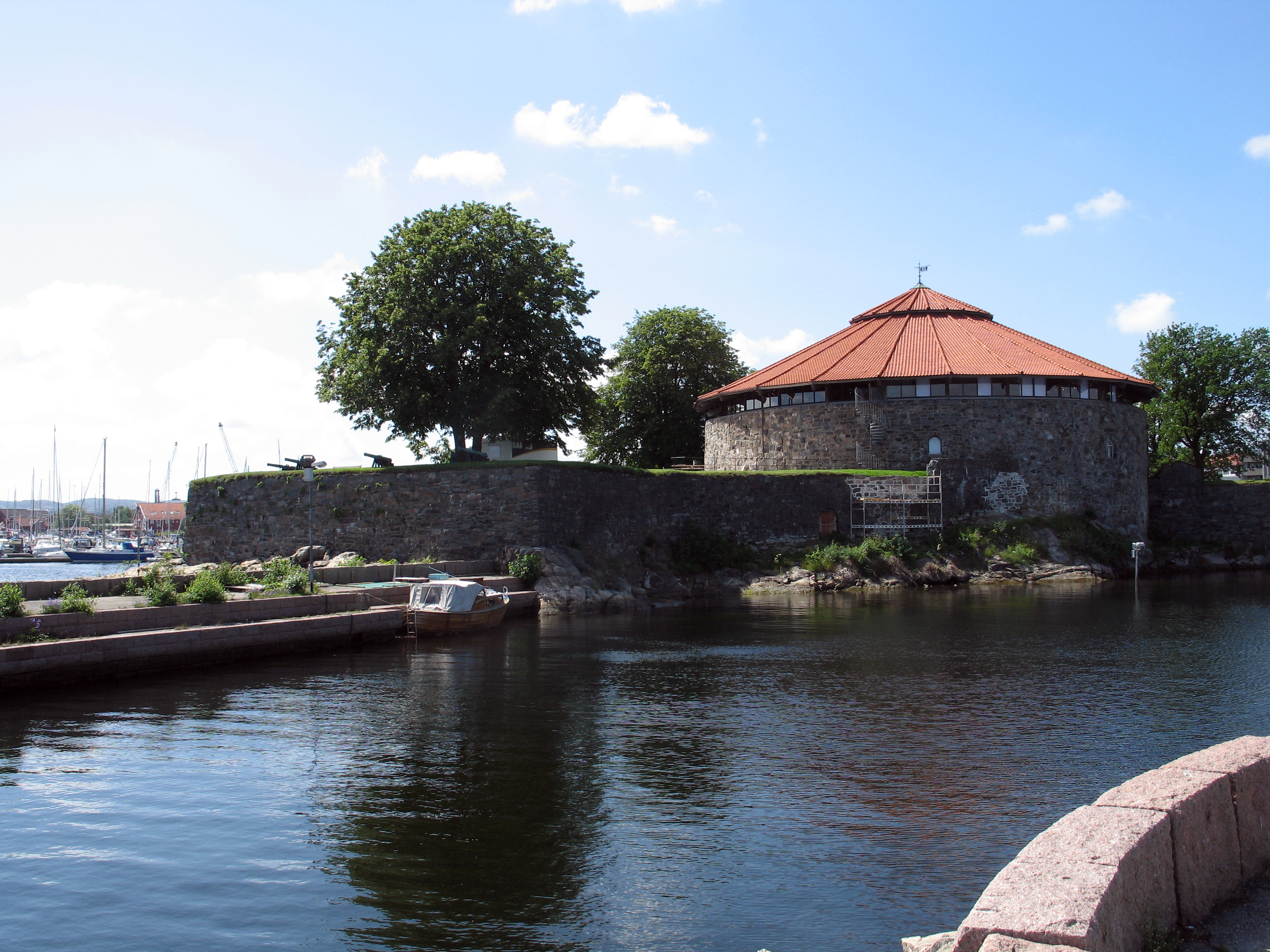
Kristiansand Boardwalk

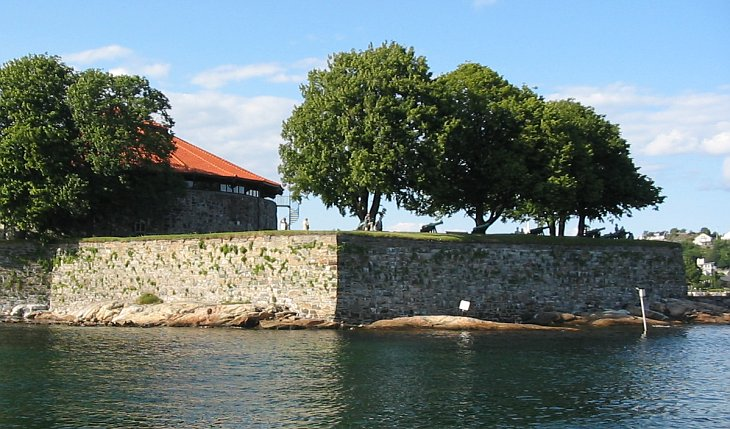
Seaside promenade

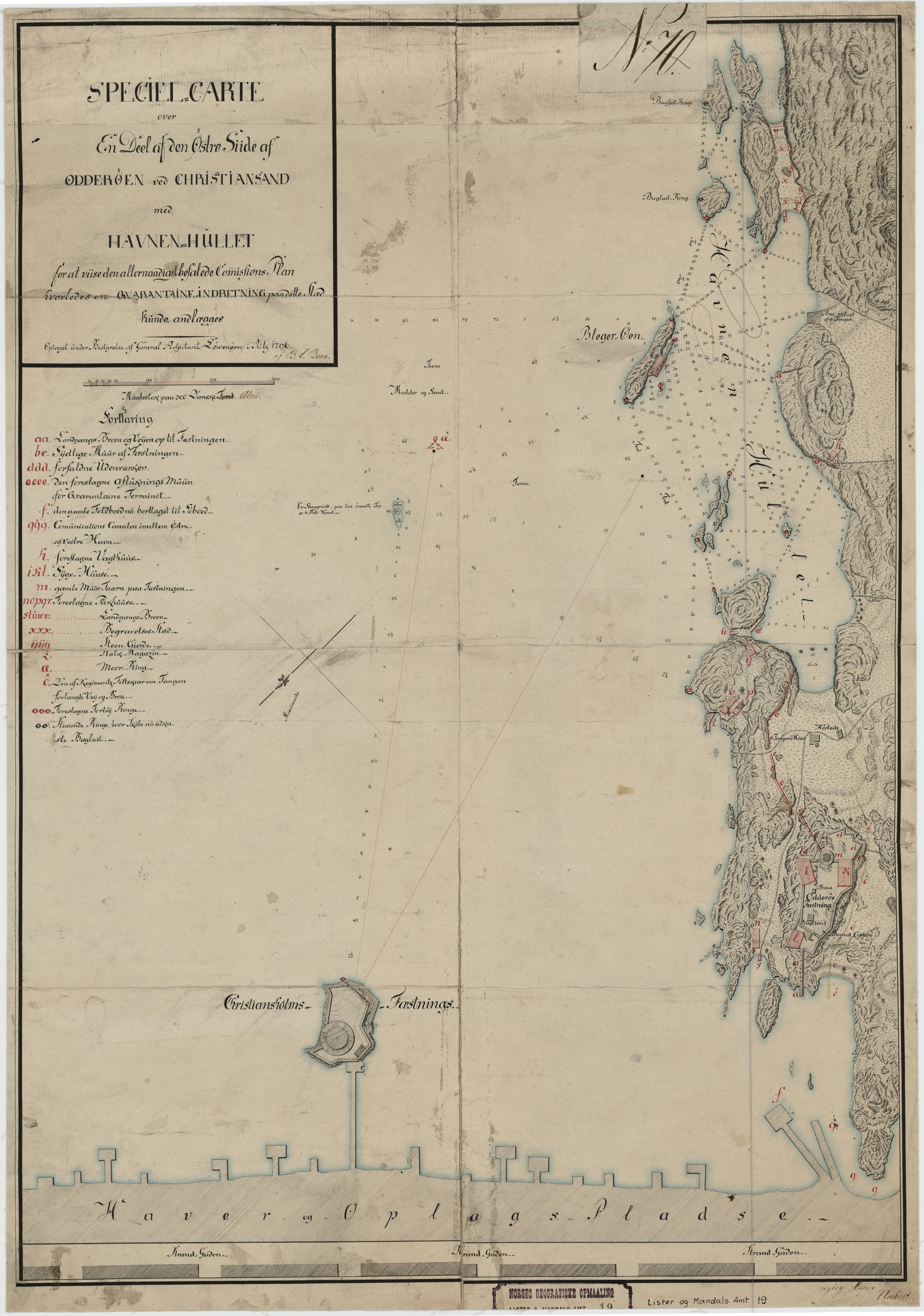
Map of Christianssand's Eastern Port and Odderøya (1796)

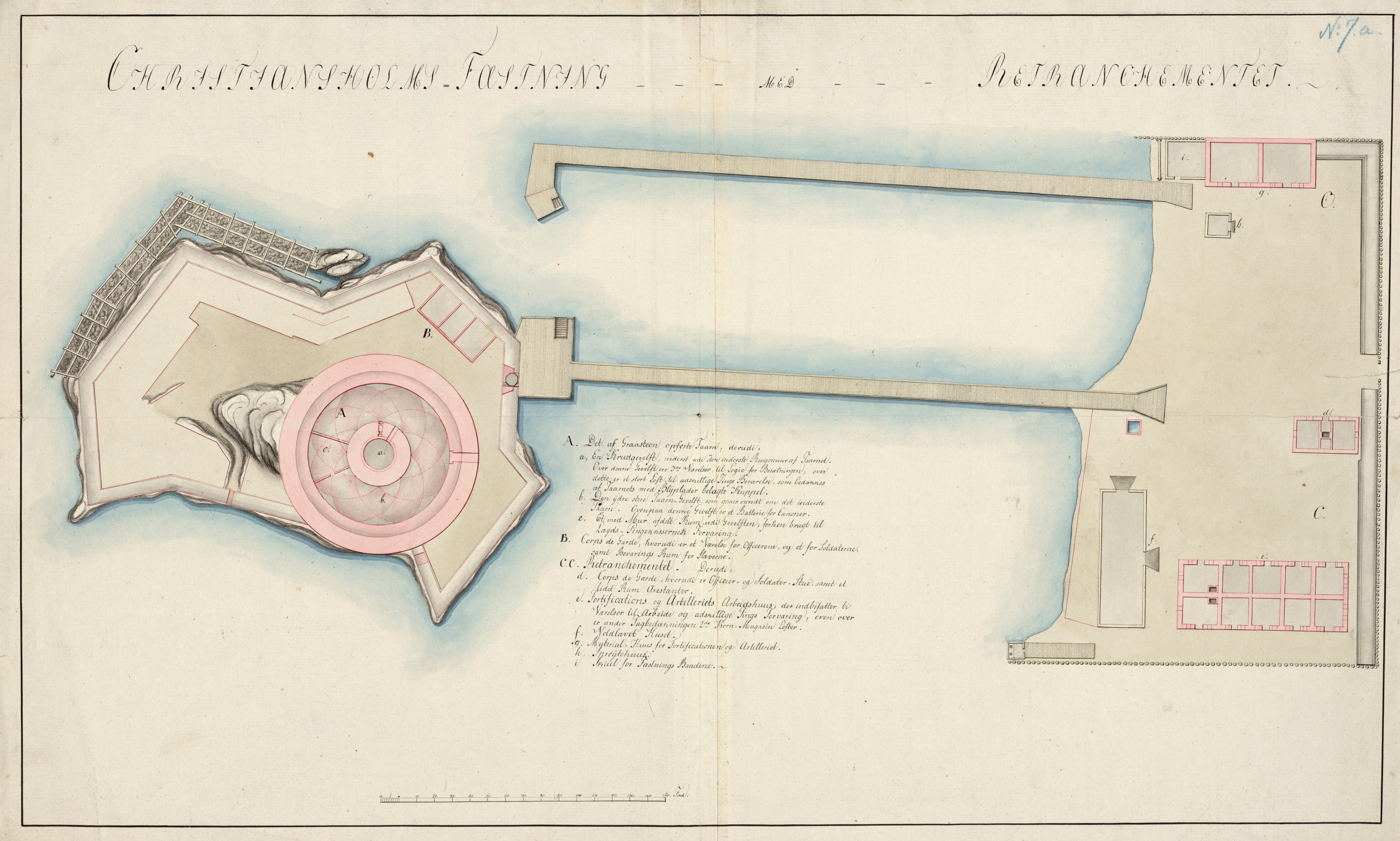
Map from about 1800

== Other sources ==
- Holte, Leiv (1941). Christiansholm og Retranchementet (in Norwegian). Kristiansand: Kristiansand kommune.
