= Flekkerøy =

Distrikt Flekkerøy
- District
- Coat of arms

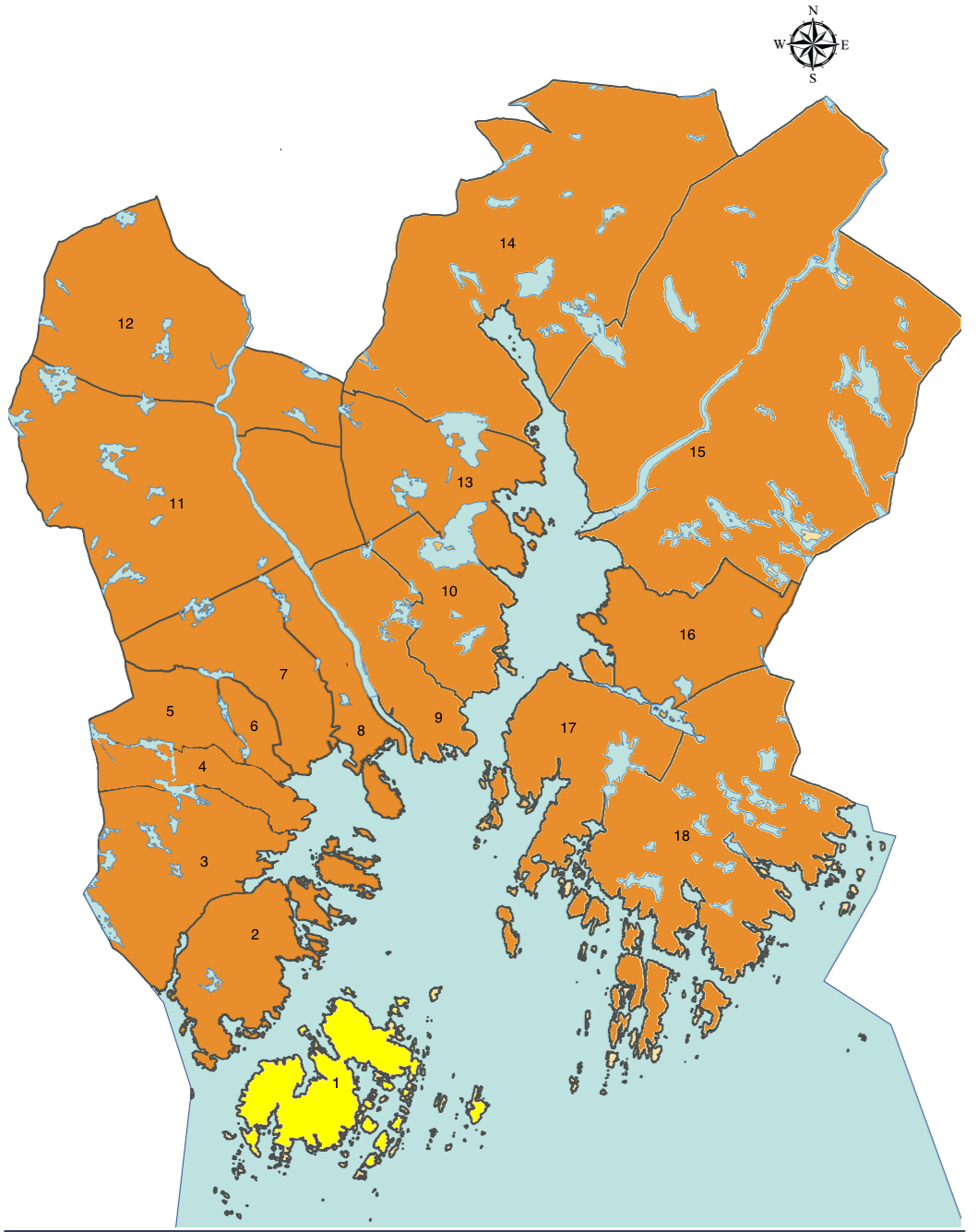
- Coordinates: 58.06923°N 7.99399°E
- Country: Norway
- Region: Southern Norway
- County: Agder
- City: Kristiansand
- Borough: Vågsbygd

Area
  - Total: 6.2 km^{2} (2.4 sq mi)
- Elevation: 13 m (43 ft)

Population (2014)
  - Total: 3,632
- Time zone: UTC+01:00 (CET)
  - Summer (DST): UTC+02:00 (CEST)
- ISO 3166 code: NO-030112

Flekkerøya
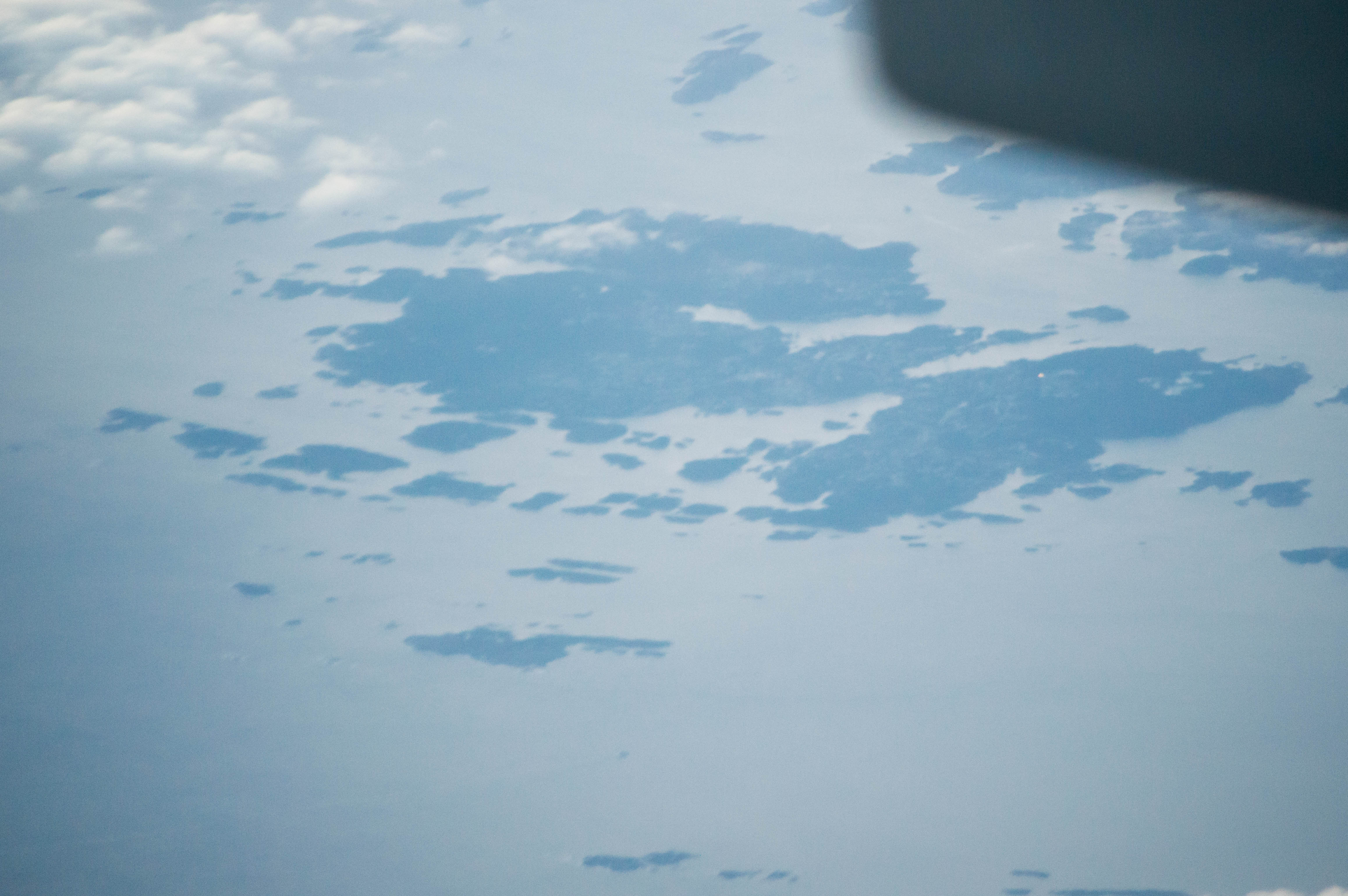
- Aerial view of the island
- Interactive map of the island

Geography
- Location: Agder, Norway
- Area: 6.6 km^{2} (2.5 sq mi)
- Length: 3.5 km (2.17 mi)
- Width: 4.2 km (2.61 mi)
- Highest elevation: 57 m (187 ft)
- Highest point: Høyfjellet

Administration
- Norway
- County: Agder
- Municipality: Kristiansand Municipality

Flekkerøy or Flekkerøya is an island and residential district in Kristiansand Municipality in Agder county, Norway. The district is located within the borough of Vågsbygd. It consists of 4 main neighborhoods: Berge/Andås, Kjære, Lindebø/Skålevik, and Mæbø/Høyfjellet. The residential district covers the whole island of Flekkerøya which lies about 10 kilometres (6.2 mi) south of the centre of the city of Kristiansand. Since 1989, the island (and district) has been connected to the mainland through the Flekkerøy Tunnel, a 2,320-metre (7,612 ft) long subsea road tunnel. The island has 3,632 inhabitants (as of 23 October 2013). Flekkerøy Church is located on the island.

== History ==
Since the 15th century, the island of Flekkerøya was an important harbour along the Skagerrak coast. Since 1540, it has been considered as the most important outport in the whole region of Southern Norway. In 1555, the first fortifications were built, but it was torn down in 1561. Anne of Denmark and James VI of Scotland came to Flekkerøy in 1589.

In the early 17th century, the harbour again became of strategic importance, and in 1635 the island was visited by King Christian IV who decided to build the Christiansø Fortress to protect the harbour. In 1656, the Fredriksholm Fortress was built, and the Christiansø Fortress was abandoned.

In 1807, about 250 people lived on the island. On 18 September 1807 during the English Wars, a Royal Navy squadron led by HMS Spencer arrived on Flekkerøy and proceeded to slight the disused Fredriksholm Fortress by blowing it up. Four British servicemen were killed in the explosion after they went to check on the powder barrels' fuses. In 1848, a cannon battery was built, but in 1872 it was abandoned, and in 1874 the partially rebuilt Fredriksholm fortress was also closed down for good.

In 2005, the remaining military properties on Flekkerøya were secured for public outdoor recreation by the Ministry of Climate and Environment.

== Politics ==
The 10 largest politics parties in Flekkerøy (2015):

Kristiansand city council votes from Flekkerøy 2015
Christian Democratic Party	48.4% (704 votes)
Conservative Party	17.2% (250 votes)
Labour Party	12.6% (183 votes)
Progress Party	7.4% (107 votes)
The Democrats	5.8% (83 votes)
Green Party	2.3% (33 votes)
Liberal Party	2.1% (31 votes)
The Christians	1.2% (18 votes)
Socialist Left Party	1% (15 votes)
Centre	0.5% (7 votes)
Others	0.4% (5 votes)
Total	1431 votes

== Transportation ==
The main bus stop on the island is at the roundabout where County Road 457 ends. Line 07 is the local line on the island.

Bus transportation from Flekkerøy
Line	Destination
M1	Flekkerøy - Sørlandsparken-Dyreparken IKEA
M1	Flekkerøy - Kvadraturen
N2	Flekkerøy - Voiebyen - Kvadraturen
07	Åshavn - Flekkerøy - Skålevik

== Notable people ==
- Audun Laading, bassist of English-based Her's, died 2019

== Media gallery ==
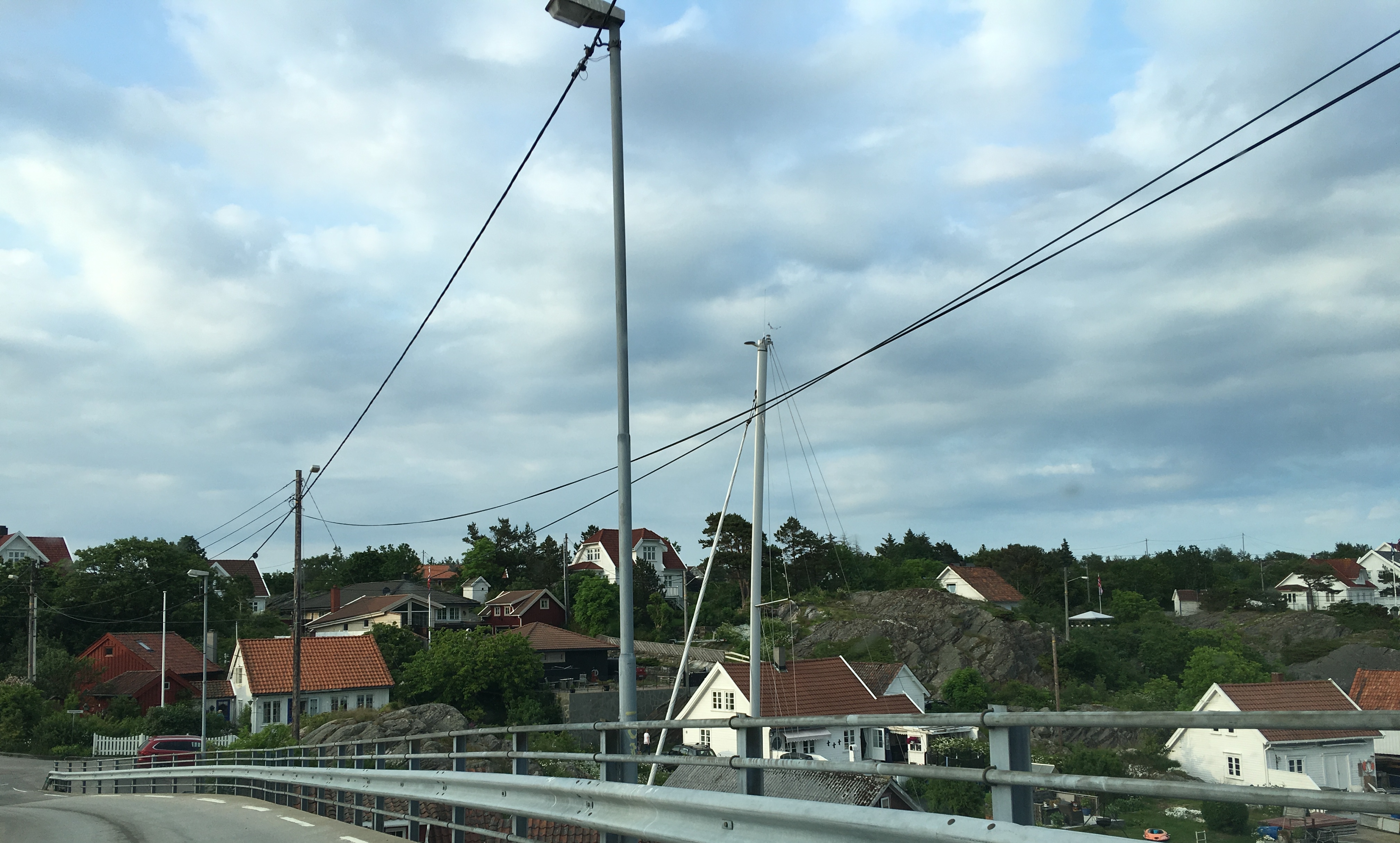
Skålevik

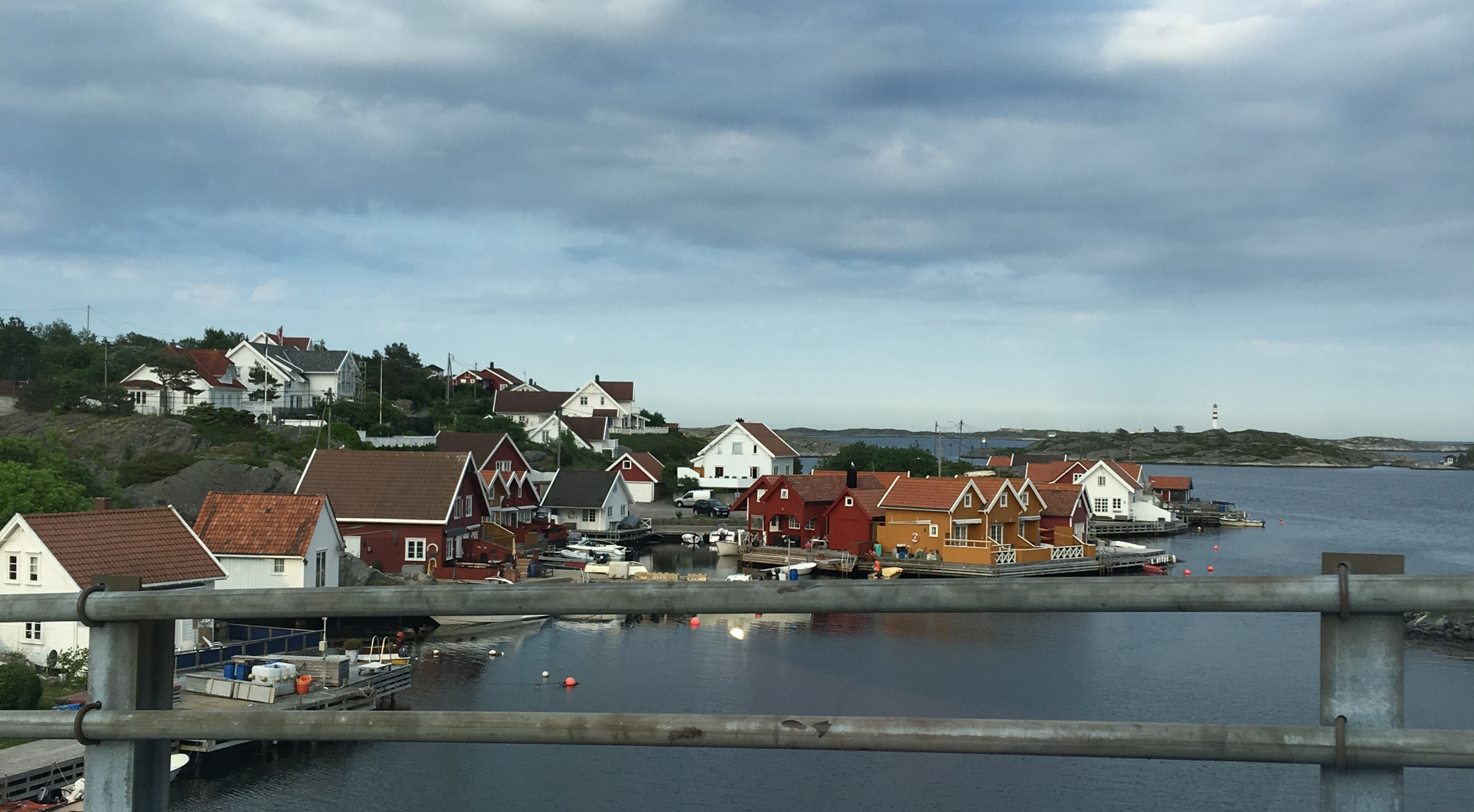
Skålevik

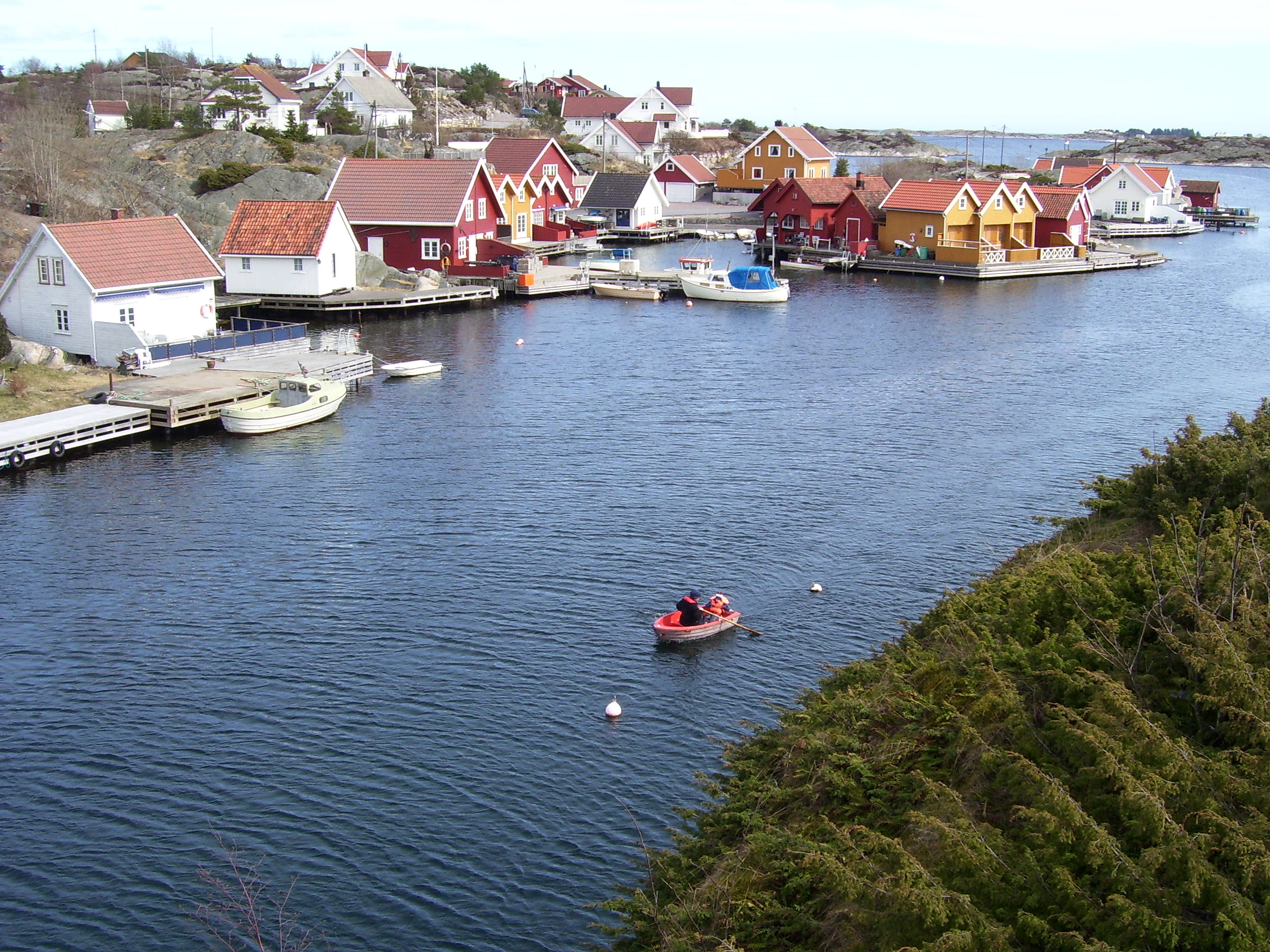
Flekkerøy coast

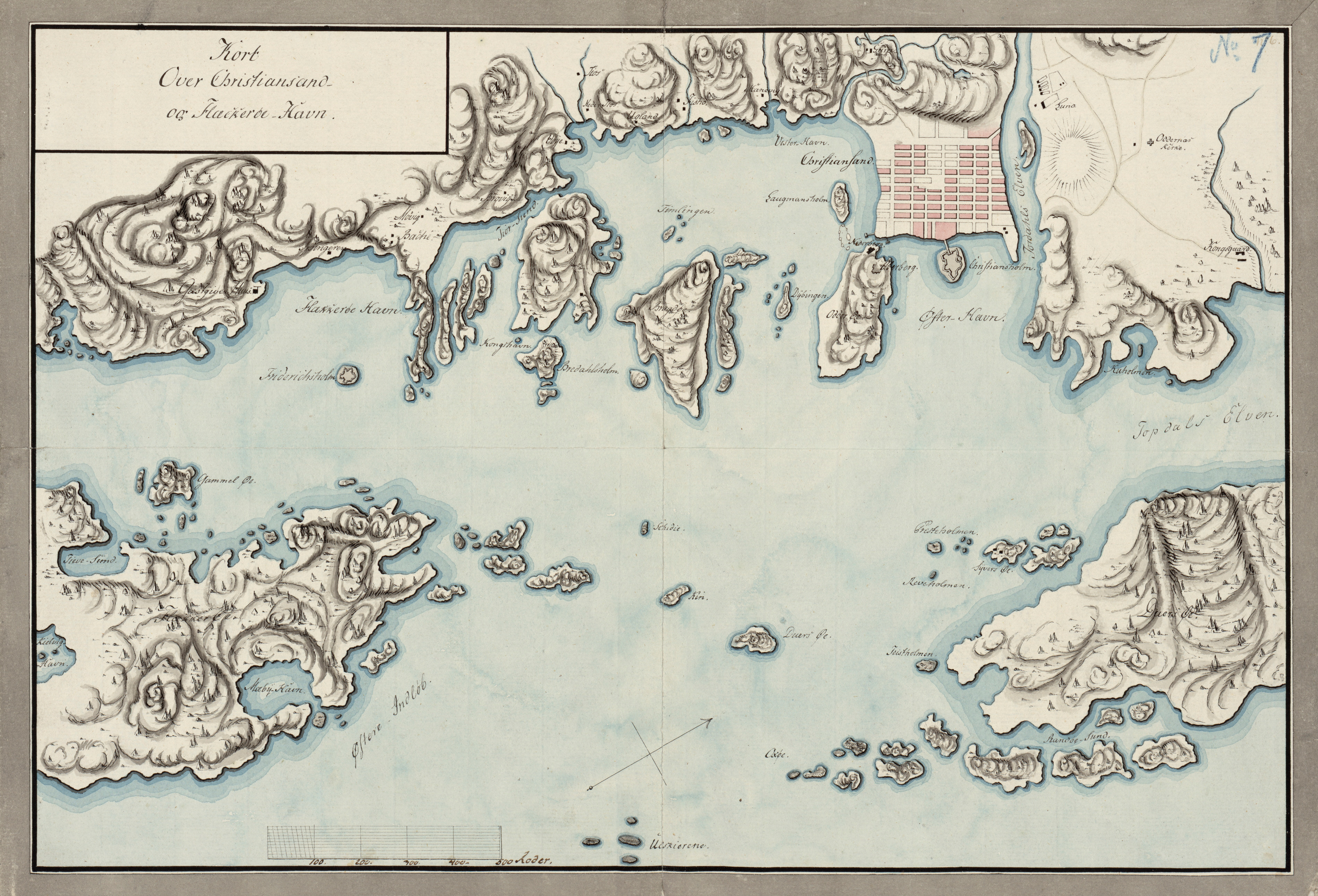
Old map of the Kristiansand harbour

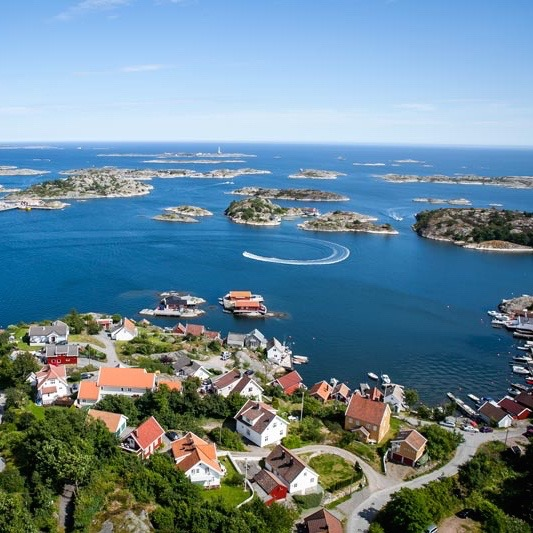
View of the coastline

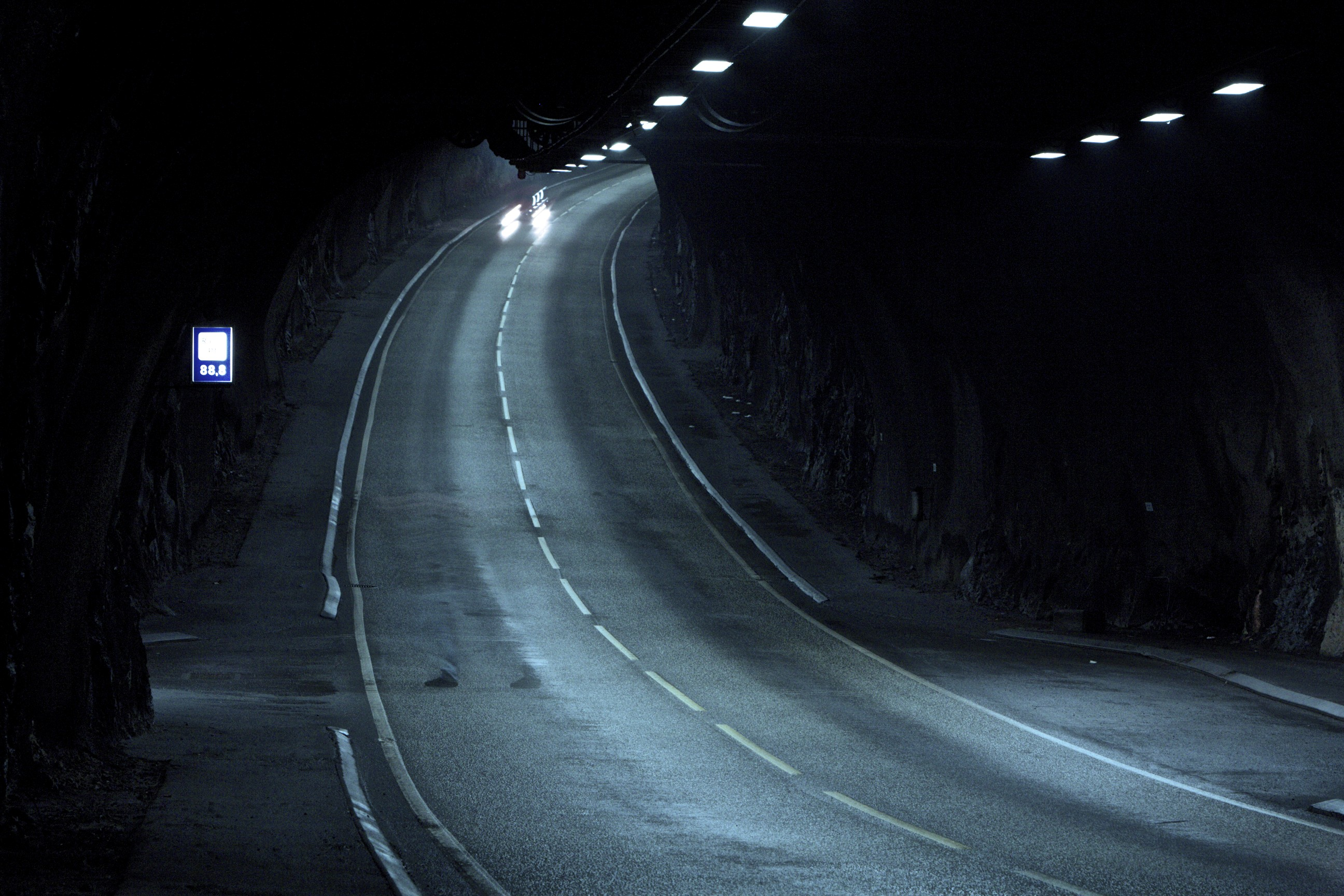
Inside the Flekkerøy Tunnel
