= Hove, Norway =

Peninsula on Tromøya Island, Norway

Hove
- Beach/Peninsula
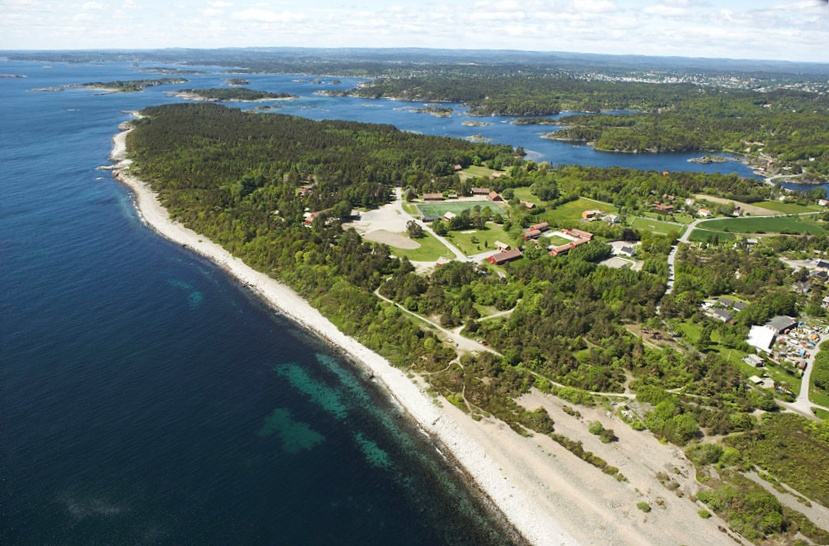
- View of Hove
- Interactive map of Hove
- Coordinates: 58°26′33″N 8°50′35″E
- Location: Agder, Norway
- Part of: Tromøya

Hove is a peninsula and beach area on the island of Tromøya in Arendal Municipality in Agder county, Norway.

== Location ==
The Hove area lies on the southwest part of the island of Tromøya. The Skagerrak lies to the southeast, and to the northwest is Hove Bay (Hovekilen), a shallow protected marine area. There is a strait to the southwest, separating Hove from the islands of Merdø and Gjessøya, and northeast of Hove is Spornes, with a beach that alternates between a sandy beach and a pebble beach depending on the wind and weather. Tromøy Church and the Brekka farm stand further to the northeast. The entire area is characterized by a large moraine, which creates the natural basis for pebble beaches, sandy beaches, and large areas of Aust-Agder's best arable land. The outer part of the Hove area is part of a moraine landscape area with the protected Hove Woods (Hoveskogen), containing windswept Scots pine. The inner part, facing Hove Bay, has extensive camping and beaches for swimming. Hove Camping and the Hove Farm are also located here. It is about 10 kilometers (6.2 mi) from Hove to the town of Arendal.

== History ==
=== Viking era ===
There are 17 registered burial mounds in Hove. The mounds date from the Bronze Age to the Viking Age. Hove was a part of a southwest Norwegian Viking kingdom around 800 AD. The name Hove suggests that it may have been the site of an old heathen hof.

=== Modern history ===
Hove Camp was taken over by the German occupation forces during the Second World War. Three radar installations were set up on Hove, a Regelbau R618 communications bunker, and an antiaircraft training center (the Feld Flakartillerie-schule (Nord) 50) from 1941 to 1944, probably along with four pieces of 88 mm antiaircraft artillery.

After the Second World War, Hove Camp was used by the Norwegian Armed Forces until 1962. In the 1970, the Workers' Communist Party conducted some of its annual summer camps at Hove Camp. For many years, until 2006, the state also used Hove Camp as an asylum reception center.

In 2003, the Friends of Hove (Hoves Venner) society was established, dedicated to helping preserve the area. Hove Camp is now administered by the Hove Operation and Development Company (Hove Drifts- og Utviklingsselskap AS), under 100% ownership of the municipality of Arendal, and it is being developed for cultural and tourism purposes. Starting in 2007, the camp was used for the Hove Festival, which was Norway's largest music festival that year.

The Norwegian reality television series 71° nord has used Hove several times for its broadcasts.

== Agriculture ==
Hove has easily cultivated self-draining soil, and was therefore a favorable place for early agriculture. The Hove area originally belonged to the Hove Farm, which was one of the most important farms on Tromøy. The first known records of growing potatoes in Norway show that they were grown at the Hove Farm; on May 31, 1757 the customs clerk Niels Ålholm wrote in his garden diary that he had "observeret Potatoes at opkomme" (seen the potatoes come up). In 1773, 5,015 potatoes were planted at the farm. Together with other farms located along Hove Bay, in the 19th century the Hove Farm was able to develop modern agriculture built around the sale of products in Arendal. The products were transported to the town by sea.

== Recreation ==
Hove has a shallow, sandy beach along the north side, facing Hove Bay; this was a popular swimming beach in the 1900s, especially for families with children. It is possible to take boat trips to Hove from Arendal in the summer, and ferry service operates from the town center. There is a campsite connected to the beach. The area is also a popular recreation area for hikers and other outdoor enthusiasts.

== Gallery ==
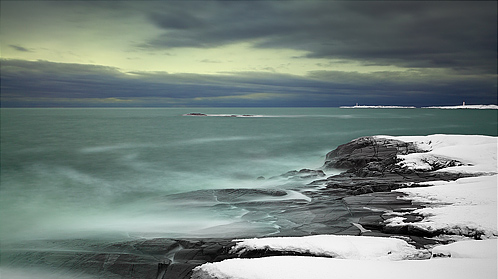
Winter in Hove

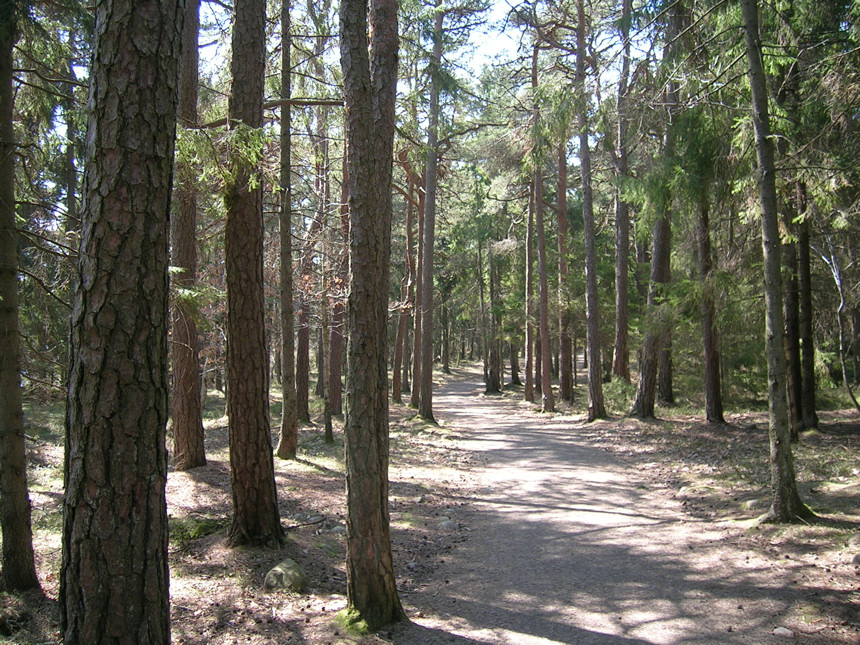
Hove Woods (protected)

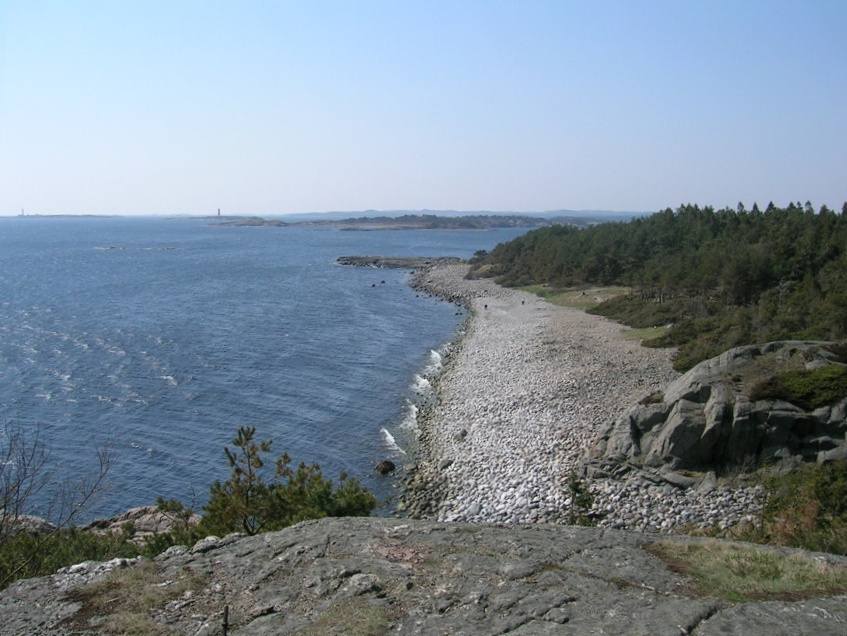
Hove Point with Merdø island and the Store Torungen and Lille Torungen islands in the background

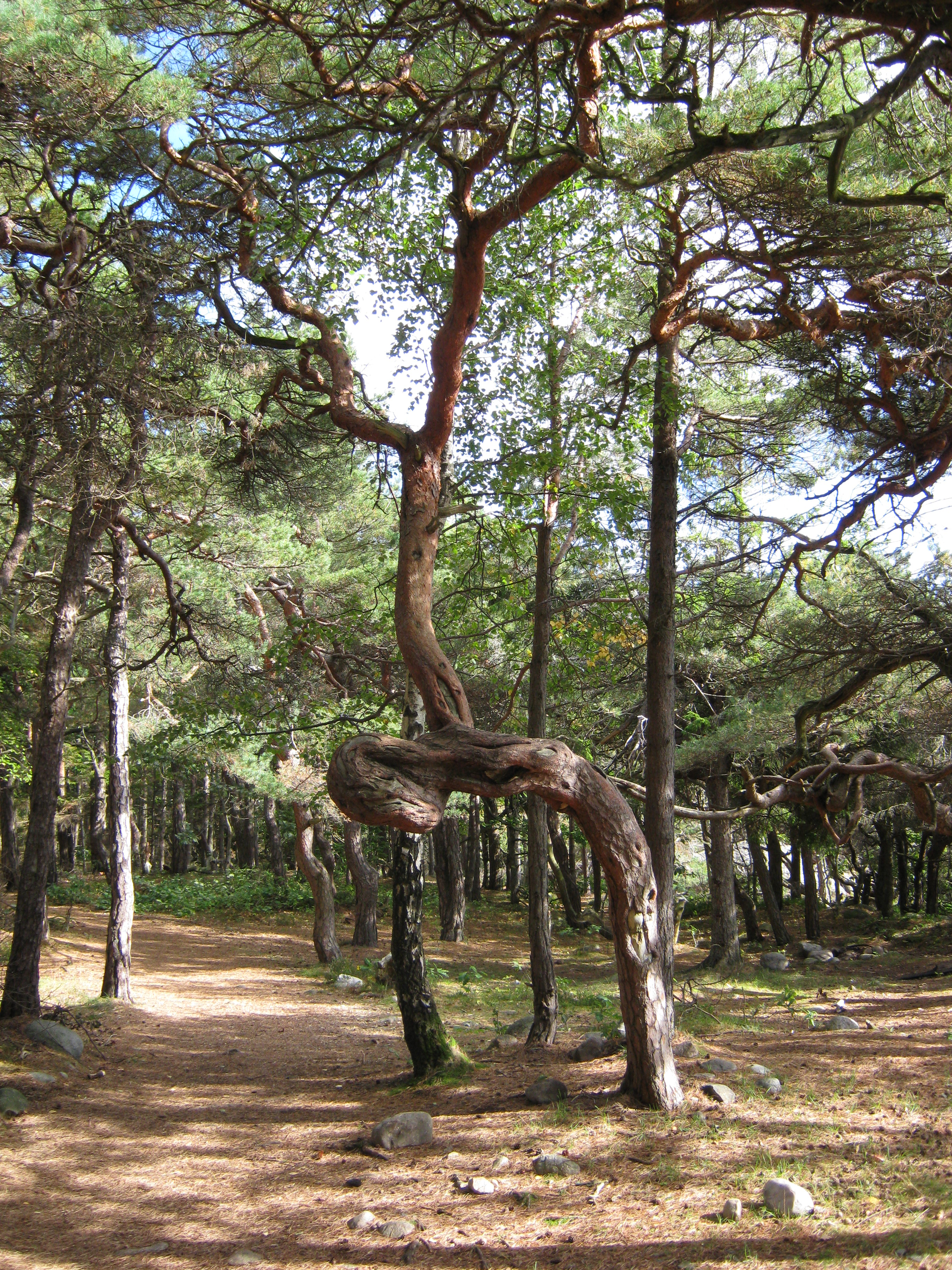
A typical twisted tree in Hove Woods
