= Hove Farm =

- Hove gård (Norwegian)
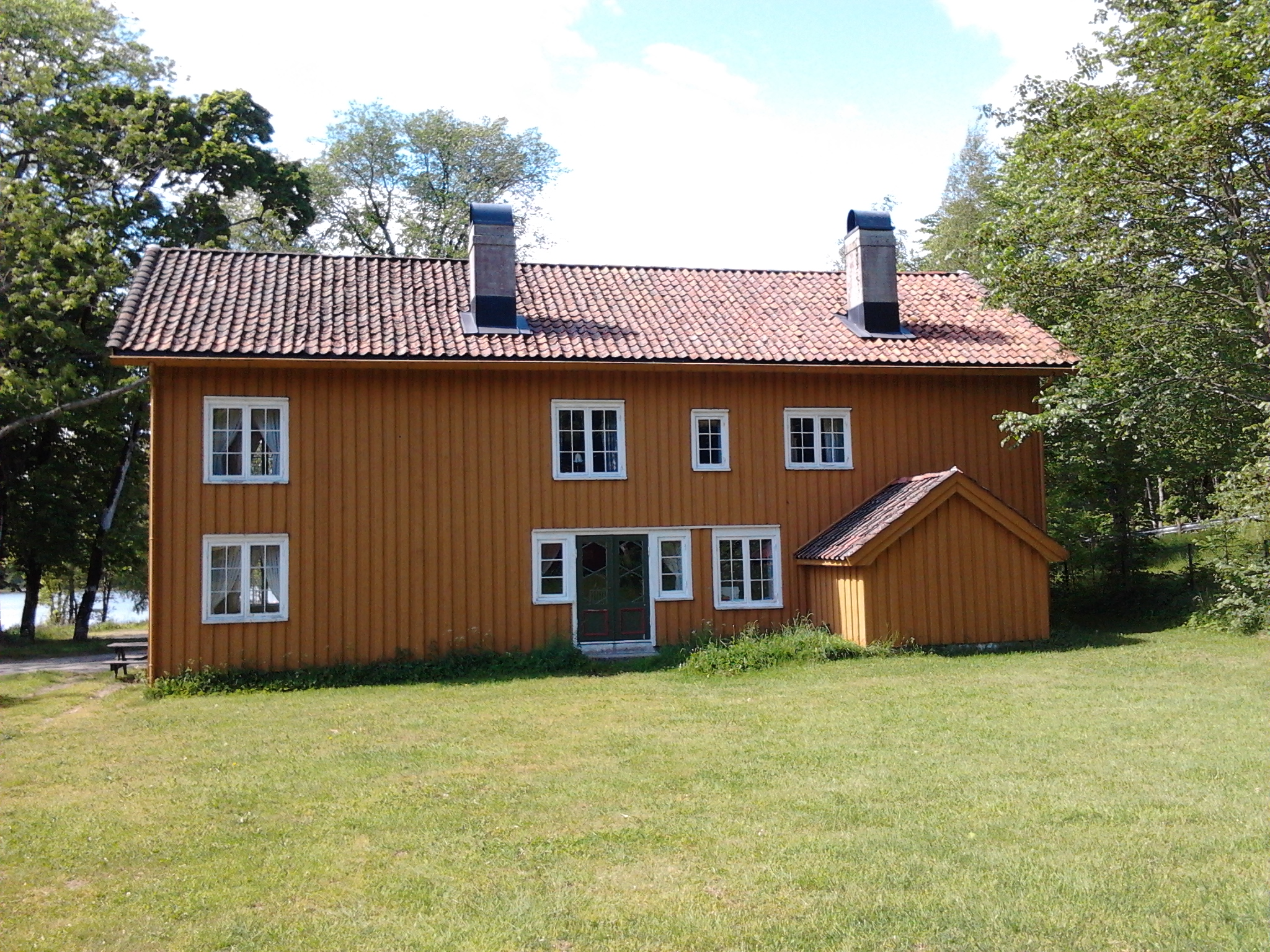
- Interactive map of Hove Farm
- 58°26′37″N 8°50′28″E

Hove Farm (Norwegian: Hove gård) is an original undivided farm (matrikkelgård) on the southwest part of the island of Tromøya in Arendal Municipality in Agder county, Norway. The farm is located on a headland, with the sea behind it to the southeast and facing Hove Bay (Hovekilen) to the northwest. Hove Bay is a protected marine area, accessible only to small vessels. The islands of Merdø and Gjesøya lies closest to Hove. Until 1942, Hove Farm had a single registration number and a single owner. The farm was purchased by the state in 1942, and was then used by the German occupation forces during the Second World War. Today the farm belongs to the municipality of Arendal.

The farmhouse dates from 1725 and was built after the original structure at the site burned. Below the farm there were one or two cotter's farms in the past, when a tannery operated at the farm in the early 1800s.

== Ownership ==
Hove Farm was mentioned in written sources for the first time in 1595, when the farm belonged to the crown. On May 19, 1659 the farm was pawned against a loan of 20,000 riksdaler. On May 31, 1663 the king sold Hove Farm to Oluf (or Ole) Jensen Brun, a wealthy merchant from Artendal. This was part of the sale of land belonging to the crown whereby the king of Denmark–Norway sold significant property to fund war efforts. Nothing else is known about the circumstances of Ole Jensen and his family living at Hove Farm.

There was a series of different owners until 1737, when Mathias Jensen Aalholm purchased the farm. The farm was owned by the Aalholm family until 1891, when it was sold by the shipowner Nils Aalholm to the shipbuilder Anders Henriksen Friisø, who owned the Friisø Shipyards (Friisø Skibsverft). The farm was sold again in 1913, to the pharmacist Martin Onsager and A. Evensby, who sold it again to the timber merchant Christian Hauge. Hauge logged the woods associated with the farm. The woods were then given protected status by a 1914 Tromøy district council statute, based on the 1893 Act on Conservation and Protection of Forests (Værneskogens bevarelse og mod skogenes ødelæggelse). Hauge then sold the farm to Knut Engelskjøn in 1915.

During the Second World War, the farm was occupied by German forces, and they set up an antiaircraft training center (the Feld Flakartillerie-schule (Nord) 50) there. The Germans built over 70 buildings in the area. After the war, the Norwegian Armed Forces took over the farm and set up a training school there for antiaircraft artillery. The school operated until 1963, and then the Norwegian Directorate of Public Construction and Property developed the location into a camping center. In 1998, the property was sold to the municipality of Arendal. Since 2002, it has been administered by the Hove Operation and Development Company (Hove Drifts- og Utviklingsselskap AS), which is under 100% ownership of the municipality of Arendal.

== Agriculture and potatoes ==
Extensive agriculture has taken place on the farm throughout history, and it is claimed that this is the first place that potatoes were grown in Norway. This is documented by the customs clerk Niels Ålholm in his garden diary for May 31, 1757, when he wrote that he had "observeret Potatoes at opkomme" (seen the potatoes come up). In 1773, 5,015 potatoes were planted at the farm. Together with other farms located along Hove Bay, in the 19th century Hove Farm was able to develop modern agriculture built around the sale of products in Arendal. The products were transported to the town by sea.
