= Lille Torungen Lighthouse =

Coastal lighthouse in Norway

Lille Torungen fyr
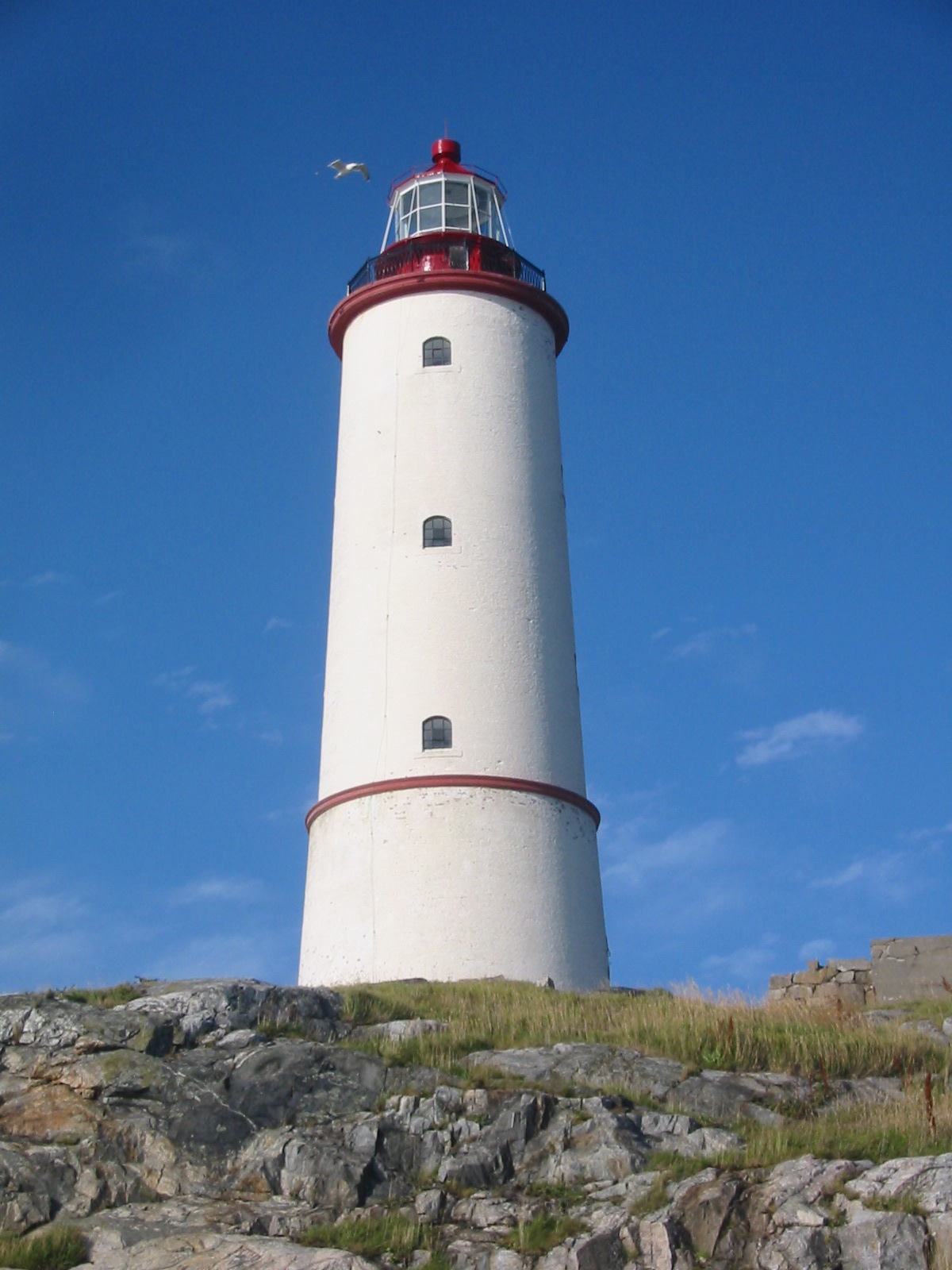
- View of the old lighthouse on Lille Torungen
- Location: Indre Torungen, Arendal, Norway
- Coordinates: 58°24′N 8°48′E

Tower
- Constructed: 1 September 1844
- Construction: cast iron
- Automated: 1914
- Height: 6 m (20 ft)
- Shape: Square
- Markings: White with red top
- Heritage: cultural property

Light
- Focal height: 9 m (30 ft)
- Range: 3.7 nmi (6.9 km; 4.3 mi)
- Characteristic: Oc(2) WRG 8s
- Norway no.: 061500

Lille Torungen Lighthouse (Norwegian: Lille Torungen fyrstasjon) is a coastal lighthouse on the island of Lille Torungen in Arendal Municipality in Agder county, Norway. This lighthouse, together with the nearby Store Torungen Lighthouse, mark the entrance from the Skaggerak through the outlying islands to the mainland town of Arendal. Both lighthouses were built in 1844 with the same specifications, making "twin" lighthouses marking the way to Arendal. The two lighthouses were put on the coat of arms for the old Hisøy Municipality in which the lighthouses were located (now they are in Arendal Municipality). Over time, both lighthouses were replaced, and the only one still standing is the Lille Torungen Lighthouse, although it is no longer in use. The site of the Lille Torungen Lighthouse is accessible only by boat. The island and site is open to the public, but the buildings are not.

== Current lighthouse ==
The present lighthouse is 6 metres (20 ft) tall. The white structure has a red roof and sits atop a square, black, metal frame. The light sits at an elevation of 9 metres (30 ft) above sea level and it emits a white, red, or green light (depending on direction), occulting twice every 9 seconds. The light can be seen for up to 3.7 nautical miles (6.9 km; 4.3 mi).

== History ==
The original lighthouse was built in 1844. The 29-metre (95 ft) tall, round, brick tower was white, with a small red stripe around it and a red top. The lighthouse tower was replaced in 1914 with an automated tower located a short distance to the southeast from the old tower. The old tower would have been torn down if not for the action of the municipal residents who wanted to save it.

== Media gallery ==
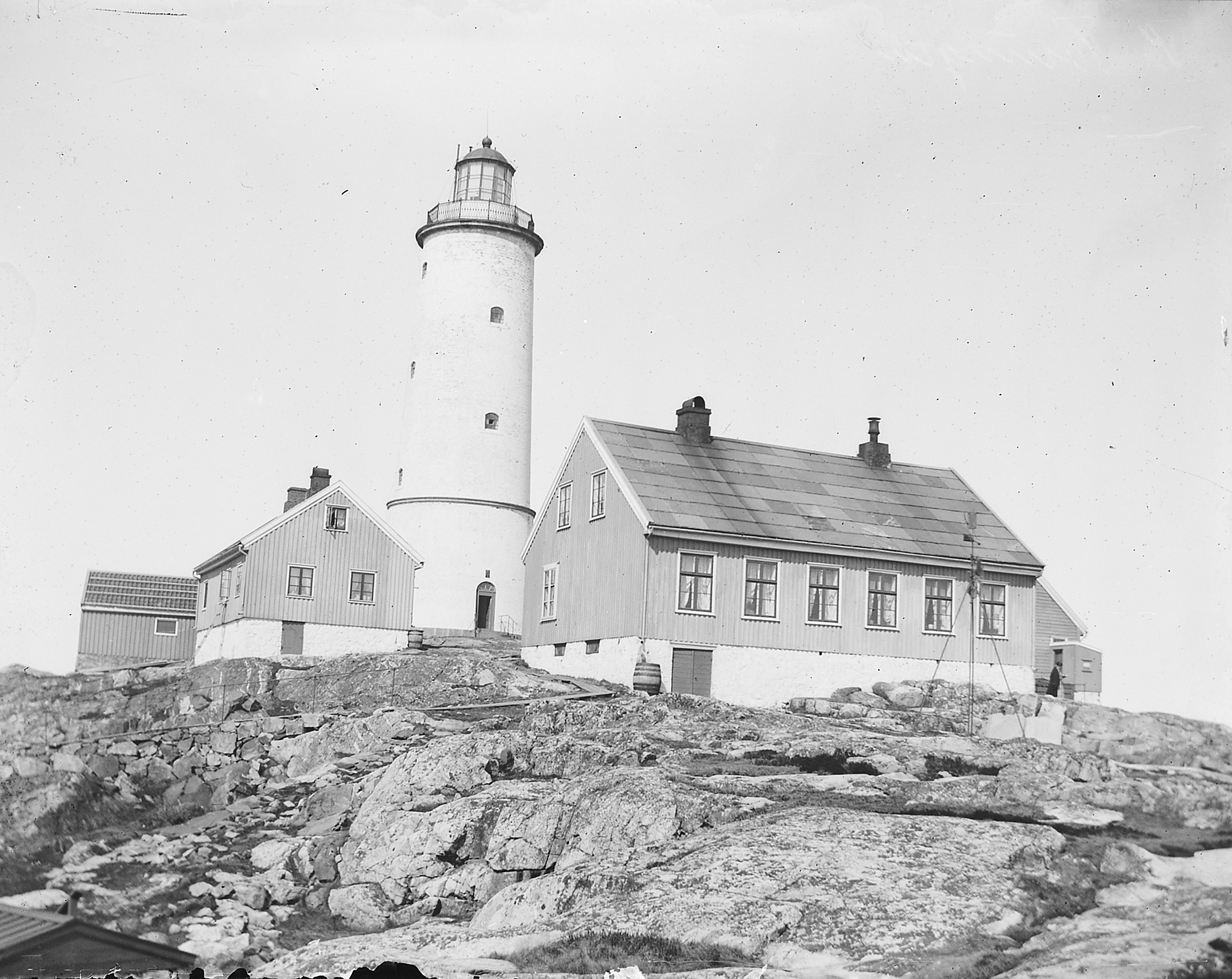
Original lighthouse station on Lille Torungen

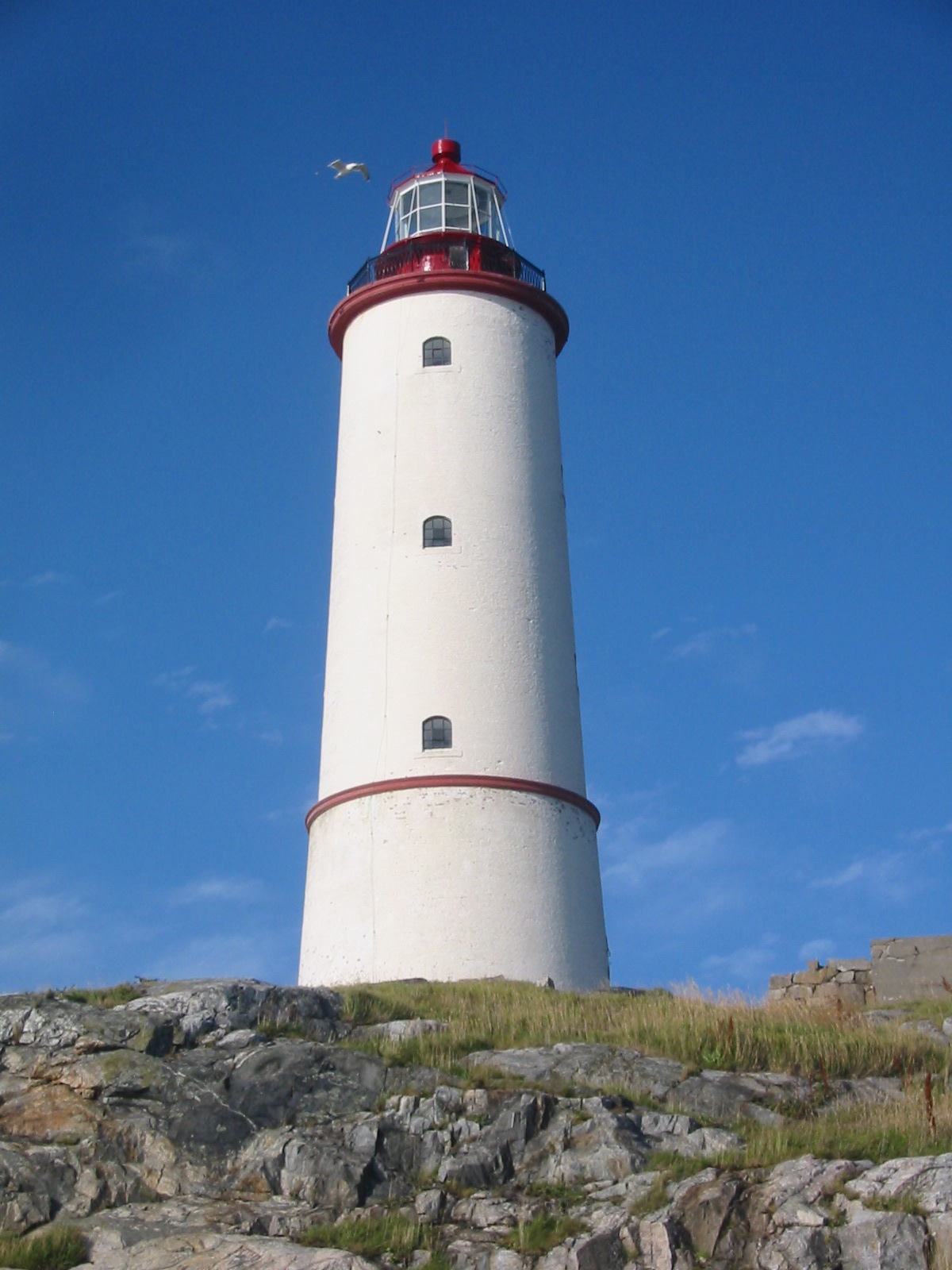
View of the old tower (in use from 1844-1914)

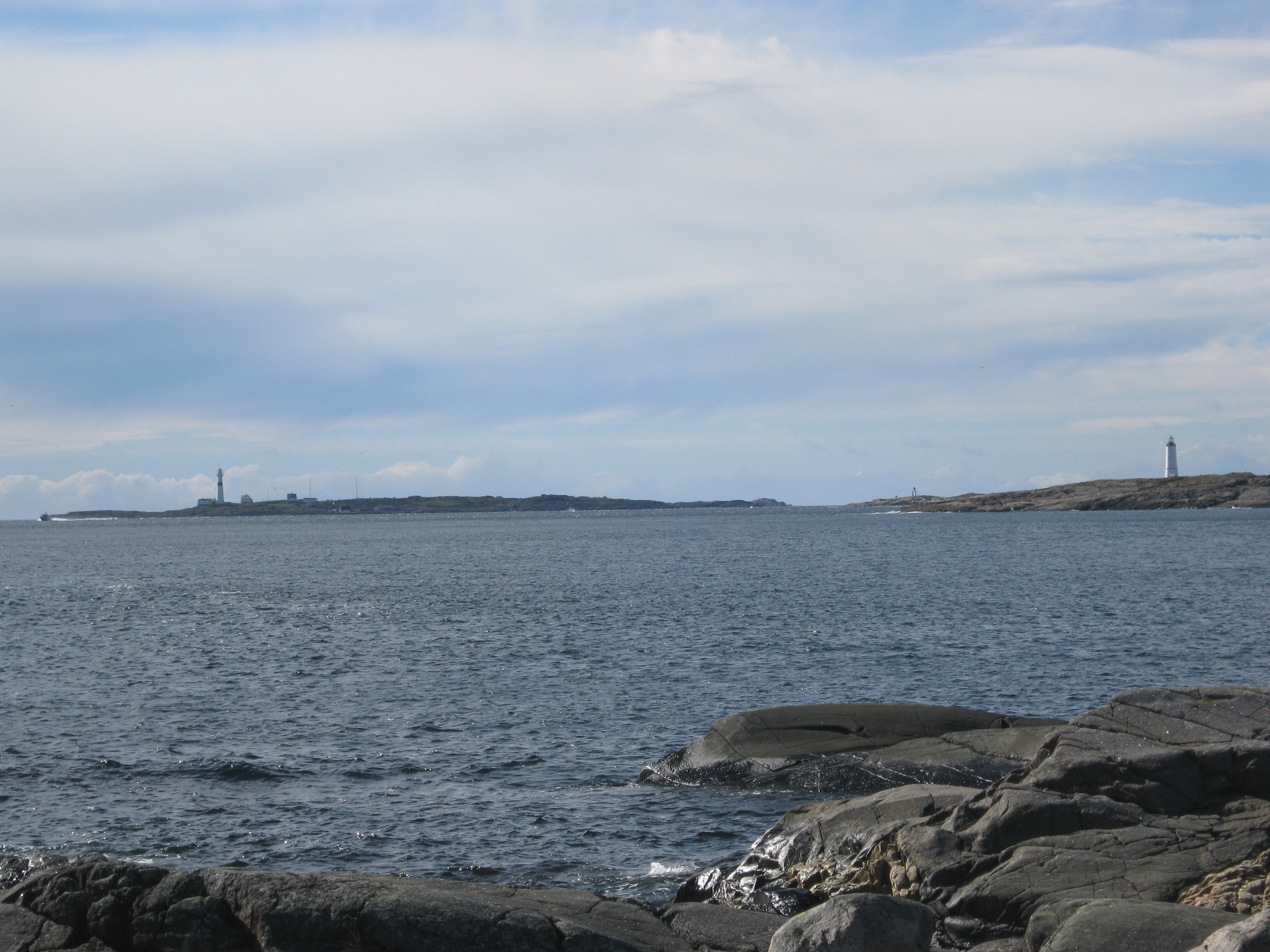
View of the two lighthouses on neighboring islands

Coat of arms of Hisøy Municipality from 1881 until 1992, which showed both Torungen lighthouses

== See also ==
- Lighthouses in Norway
- List of lighthouses in Norway
