= Store Torungen Lighthouse =

Coastal lighthouse in Norway

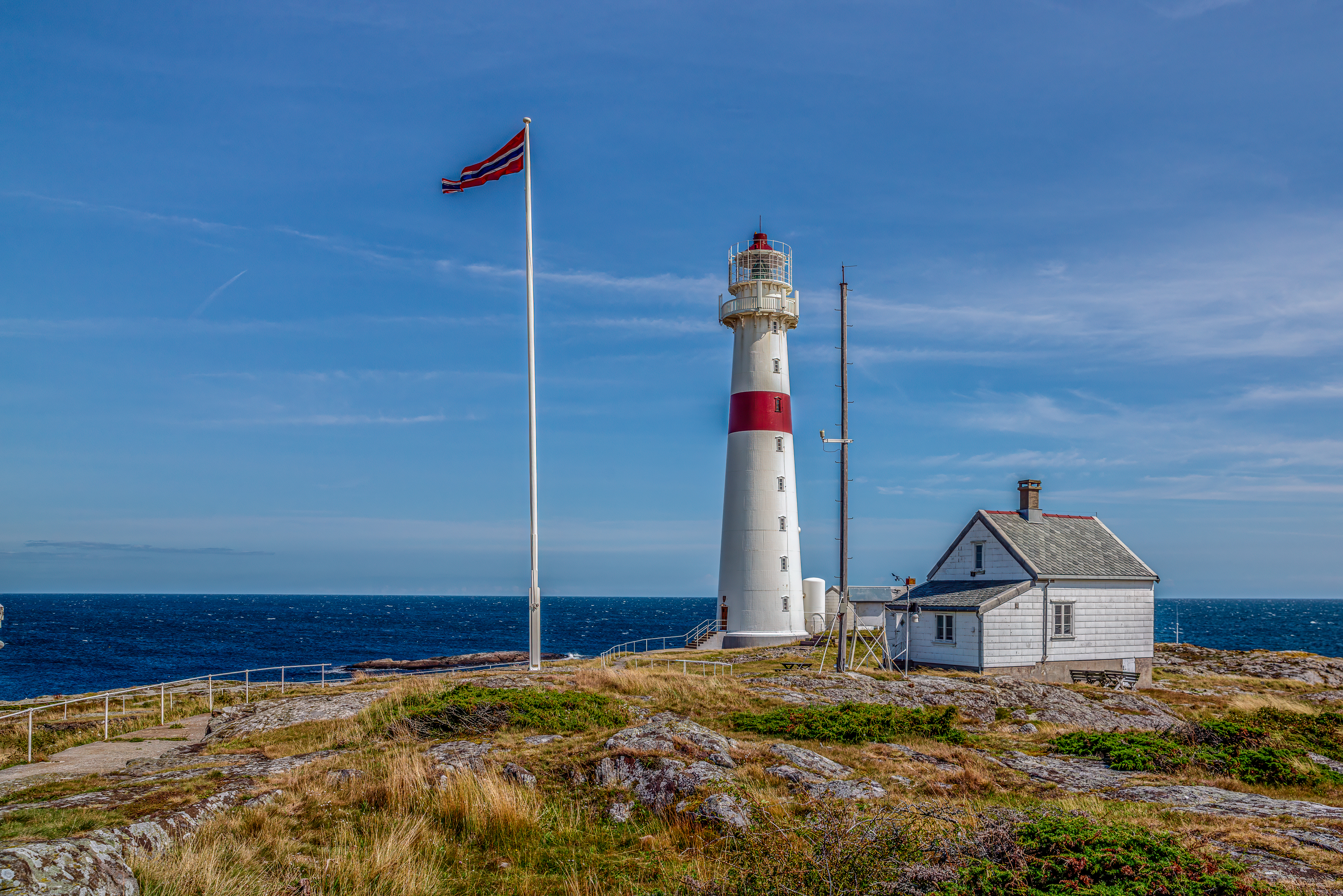
- View of the Store Torungen lighthouse
- Location: , Arendal, Norway
- Coordinates: 58°23′56″N 8°47′25″E

Tower
- Constructed: 1844
- Construction: cast iron
- Automated: 1914
- Height: 34.3 m (113 ft)
- Markings: White (tower), red (stripe)
- Heritage: cultural property
- Racon: T

Light
- First lit: 1 September 1844
- Focal height: 43.3 m (142 ft)
- Lens: second order Fresnel lens
- Range: 18.5 nmi (34.3 km; 21.3 mi)
- Characteristic: Fl W 20s
- Norway no.: 061400

Store Torungen Lighthouse (Norwegian: Store Torungen fyrstasjon) is a coastal lighthouse on the island of Store Torungen in Arendal Municipality in Agder county, Norway. This lighthouse, together with the nearby Lille Torungen Lighthouse, mark the entrance from the Skaggerak through the outlying islands to the mainland town of Arendal. Both lighthouses were built in 1844 with the same specifications, making "twin" lighthouses marking the way to Arendal. The two lighthouses were put on the coat of arms for the old Hisøy Municipality in which the lighthouses were located. Over time, both lighthouses were replaced, and the only one still standing is the Lille Torungen Lighthouse, although it is no longer in use. The site of the Store Torungen Lighthouse is accessible only by boat. The island and site is open to the public, the tower is open daily during the summers, and the lighthouse keepers house is available to rent for overnight accommodations.

== Current lighthouse ==
The present lighthouse was constructed in 1914 to replace an earlier tower from 1844. The 34.3-metre (113 ft) tall tower is white with a red stripe midway up the tower. The round tower is made of cast iron and on top there is a light with a 2nd order Fresnel lens. The light sits at an elevation of 43.3 metres (142 ft) and it emits one white flash every 20 seconds. The light can be seen for up to 18.5 nmi (34.3 km; 21.3 mi). The lighthouse also broadcasts a racon signal (the morse code letter "T").

== History ==
The original lighthouse was built in 1844. The 29-metre (95 ft) tall, round, brick tower was white, with a small red stripe around it and a red top. The lighthouse tower was replaced in 1914 with a new tower located a short distance away from the old tower. The old tower was torn down after the new tower was completed. This upset the local residents, so they pushed to prevent its twin Lille Torungen Lighthouse from being torn down too.

== Media gallery ==
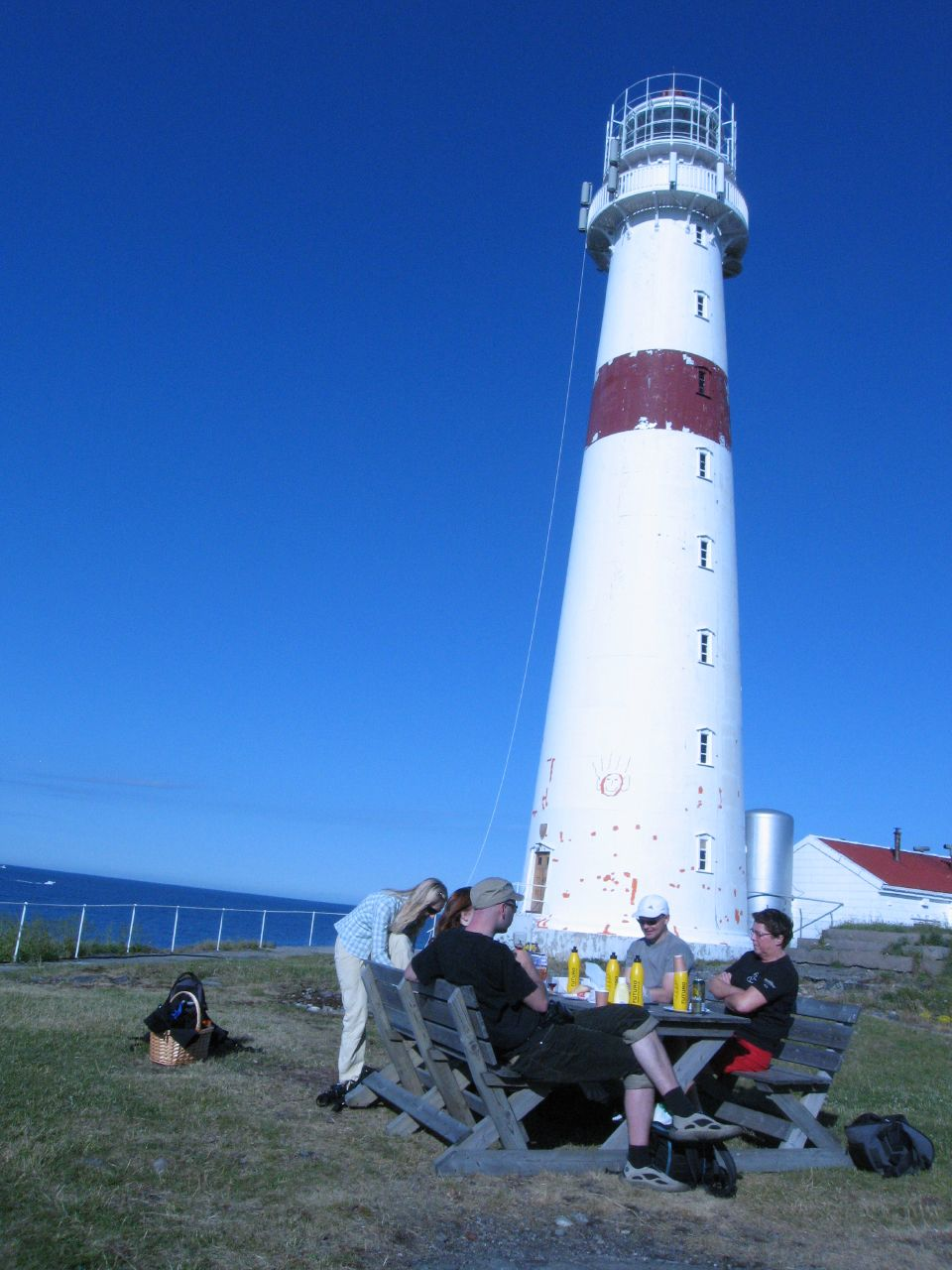
View of the present lighthouse on Store Torungen

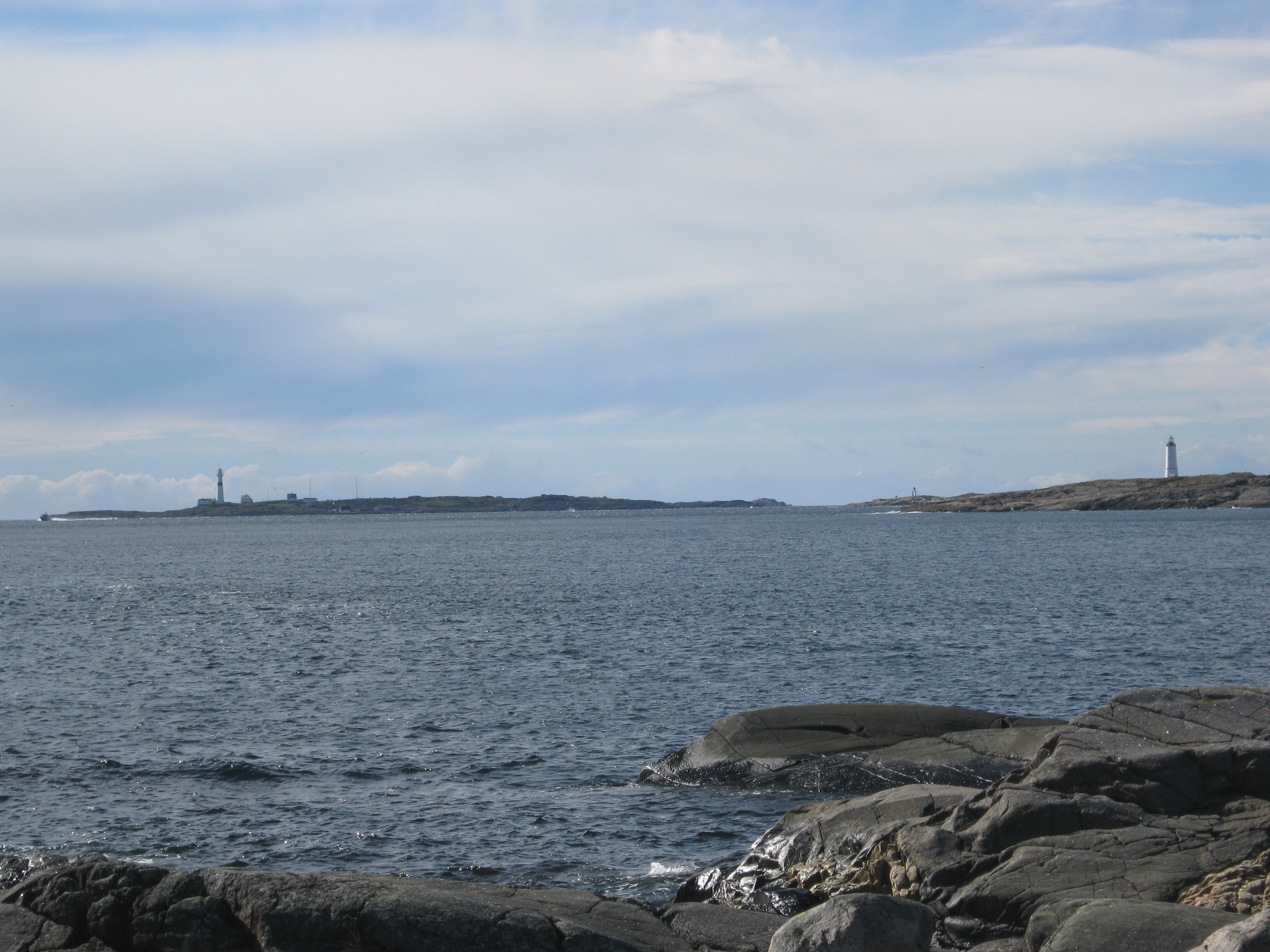
View of the two lighthouses on neighboring islands

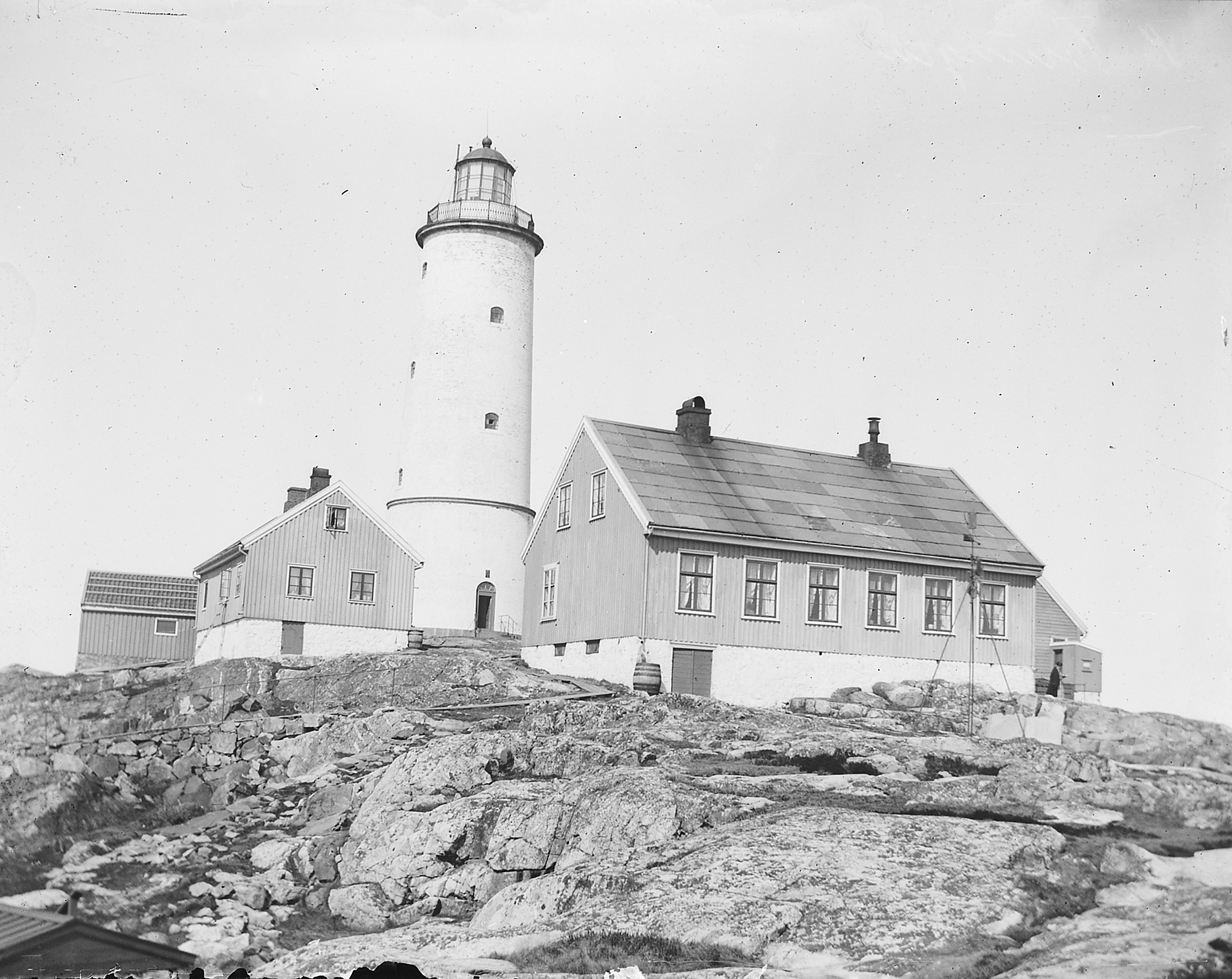
Old picture of the Lille Torungen Lighthouse which is identical to the old Store Torungen Lighthouse which originally stood form 1844–1914.

== See also ==
- Lighthouses in Norway
- List of lighthouses in Norway
