= Lund (Kristiansand) =

Borough in Kristiansand Municipality, Norway

- Borough of Kristiansand
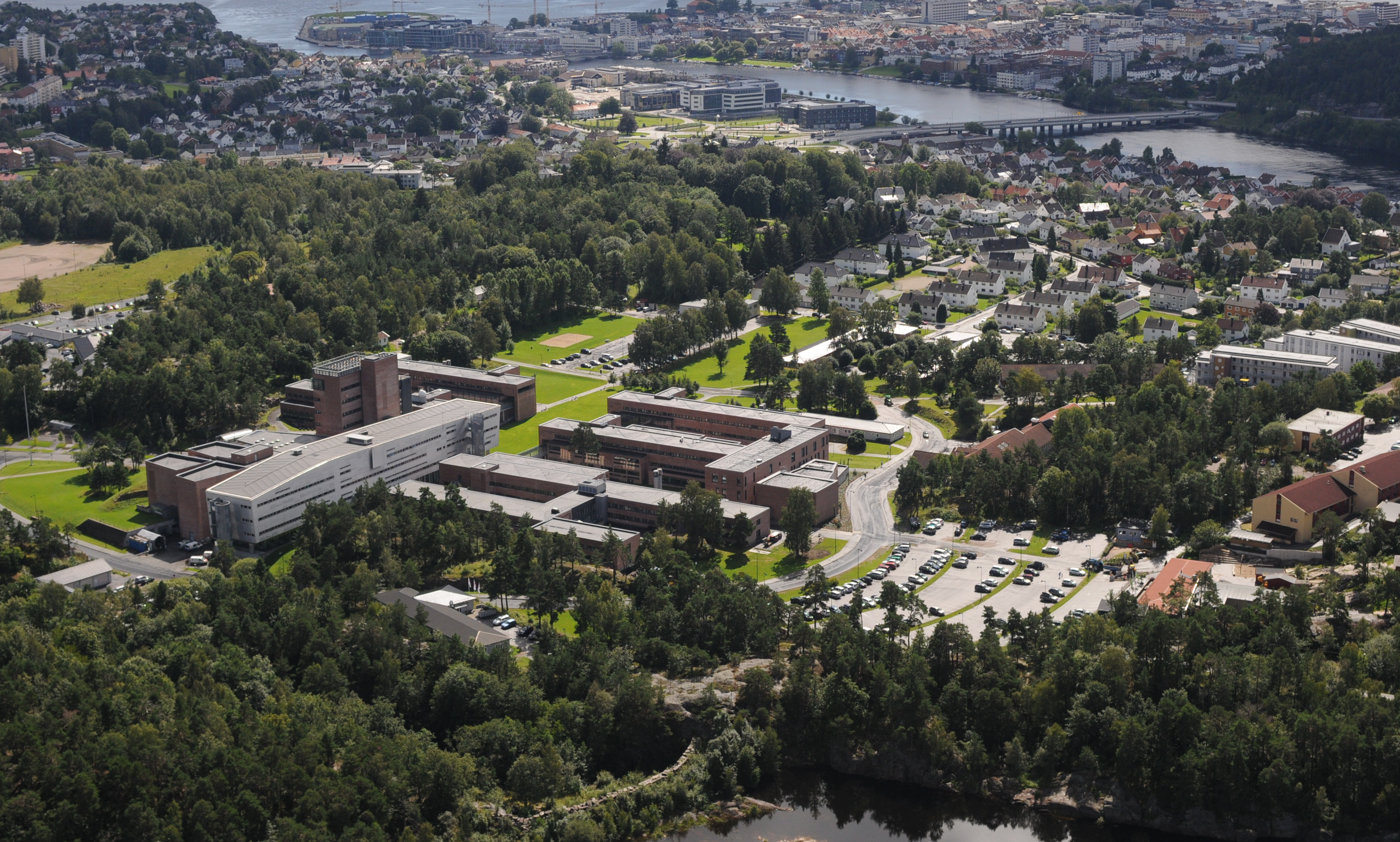
- View of the area in Lund

- Coat of arms

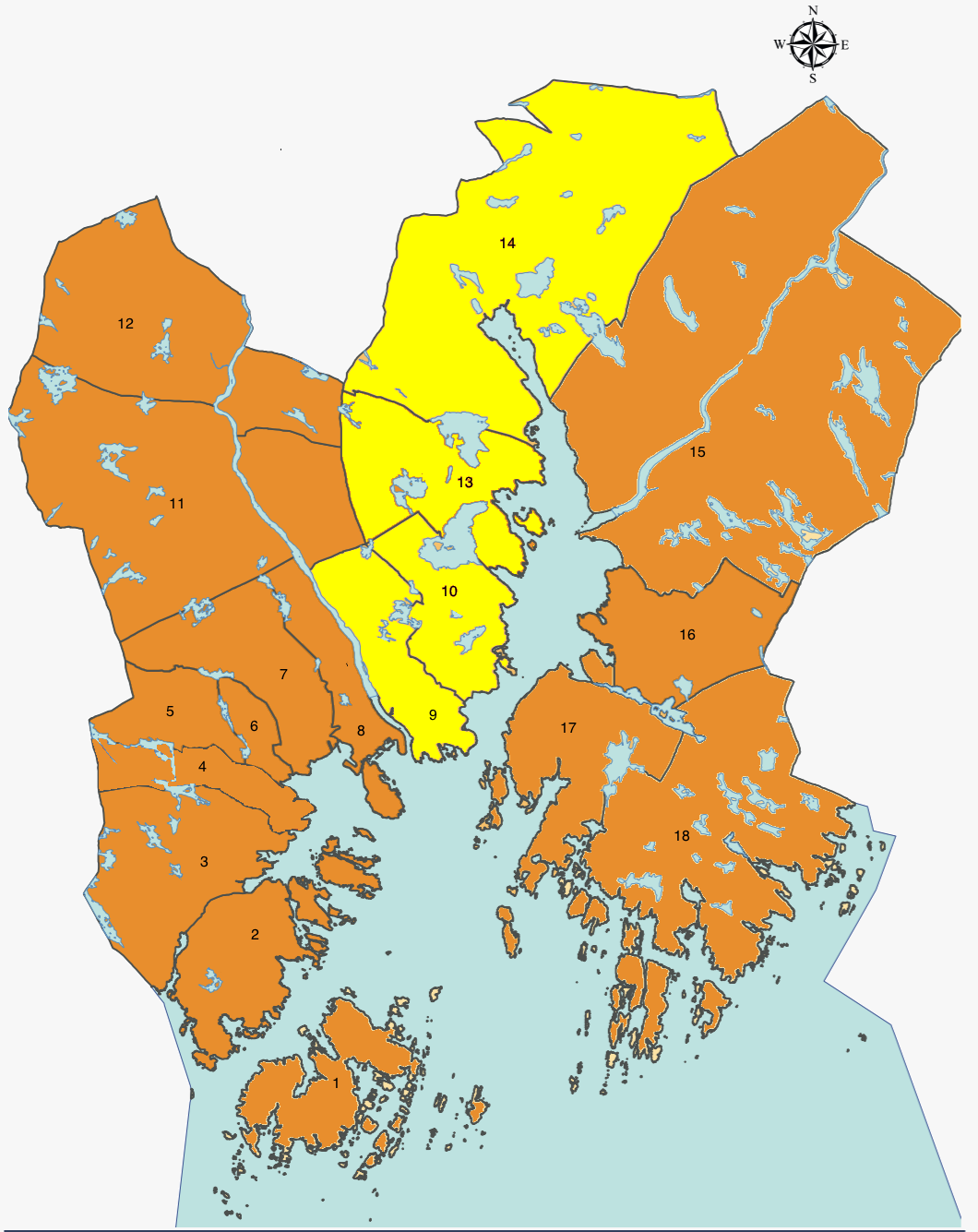
- Location of Lund, shown in yellow, in Kristiansand
- Interactive map of Lund
- Coordinates: 58.1524°N 08.0089°E
- Country: Norway
- Region: Southern Norway
- County: Agder
- Municipality: Kristiansand Municipality
- Elevation: 9 m (30 ft)

Population (2015)
  - Total: 30,000
- Time zone: UTC+01:00 (CET)
  - Summer (DST): UTC+02:00 (CEST)
- Post Code prefix: 460*, 463*, 468*, 469*
- Website: kristiansand.kommune.no

Lund is a borough and district in the city of Kristiansand which lies in Kristiansand Municipality in Agder county, Norway. It is the second largest borough in the city after Vågsbygd. In 2015, the population was about 30,000. Lund is divided into 4 districts: Lund (centrum), Gimlekollen, Justvik, and Ålefjær.

Lund lies to the north and west of Topdalsfjorden-Ålefjærfjorden and to the East of the river Otra. The borough of Oddernes lies to the east and the boroughs of Kvadraturen and Grim lie to the west. North of the borough is Vennesla Municipality.

The University of Agder is located at Lund along with Kristiansand Cathedral School.

The Church of Norway has three churches in Lund: Lund Church, Justvik Church, and Oddernes Church. Oddernes Church was one of the first churches to be built in Kristiansand.

There are three bridges connecting Lund to the city center Kvadraturen: "Lundsbroa", "Oddernesbrua" and "Christian Quartbroa". Before Oddernesbrua was built, the Lundsbroa was the main way to the east. Today, the Oddernesbrua is a part of the European route E18 highway, and the bridge ends in a tunnel. The Lundsbroa is a part of Fylkesvei 471, which eventually joins up with the E18. The recently opened Christian Quartbroa footbridge is located between the other two bridge connections.

Public transportation is available by bus, all local buses headed eastbound have more than one stop at Lund. There are also buses that go "deeper" into Lund. Line 13 Grimsmyra-Lund goes to Kuholmen in Lund, a place south of Lund, while Line 19 Suldalen-Lund UiA, follows Riksvei 471 to the University.

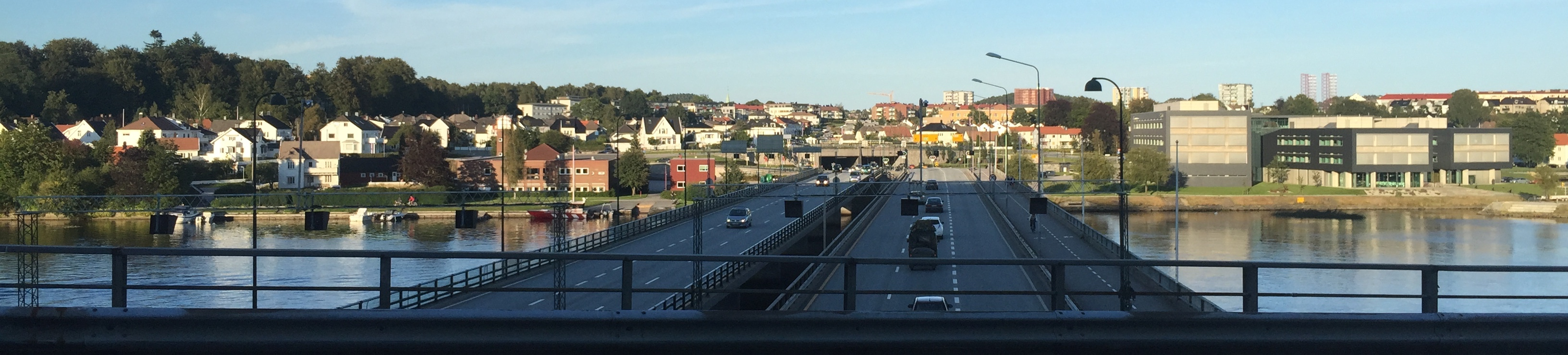
Lundesiden (The Lund side) seen from Eg over the Otra river with European route E18 crossing the river, Kjøita Park to the right and Gimle to the right

== Divisions of the borough ==
=== Districts ===
List of districts
Nr	District	Population	Map
1	Lund (Centrum)	15,000	
2	Gimlekollen	5,200	
3	Justvik	2,700	
4	Ålefjær	410	

=== Neighborhoods ===
- Galgeberg
- Gimlemoen
- Flaten
- Hamreheia
- Kokleheia
- Kongsgård
- Kuholmen
- Marvika
- Nedre Lund
- Oddemarka
- Skaugo
- Solbygg
- Sødal
- Tobienborg
- Valhalla
- Valhalla nord
- Valhalla sør
- Vige
- Bjørndalssletta
- Gimlekollen
- Gimlekollen vest
- Gimlekollen øst
- Narviga
- Prestebekken
- Prestheia
- Volleåsen
- Bleget
- Greppestølåsen
- Justneshalvøya
- Justvik
- Jærnesheia
- Kvernhusheia
- Ålefjær

== Education ==
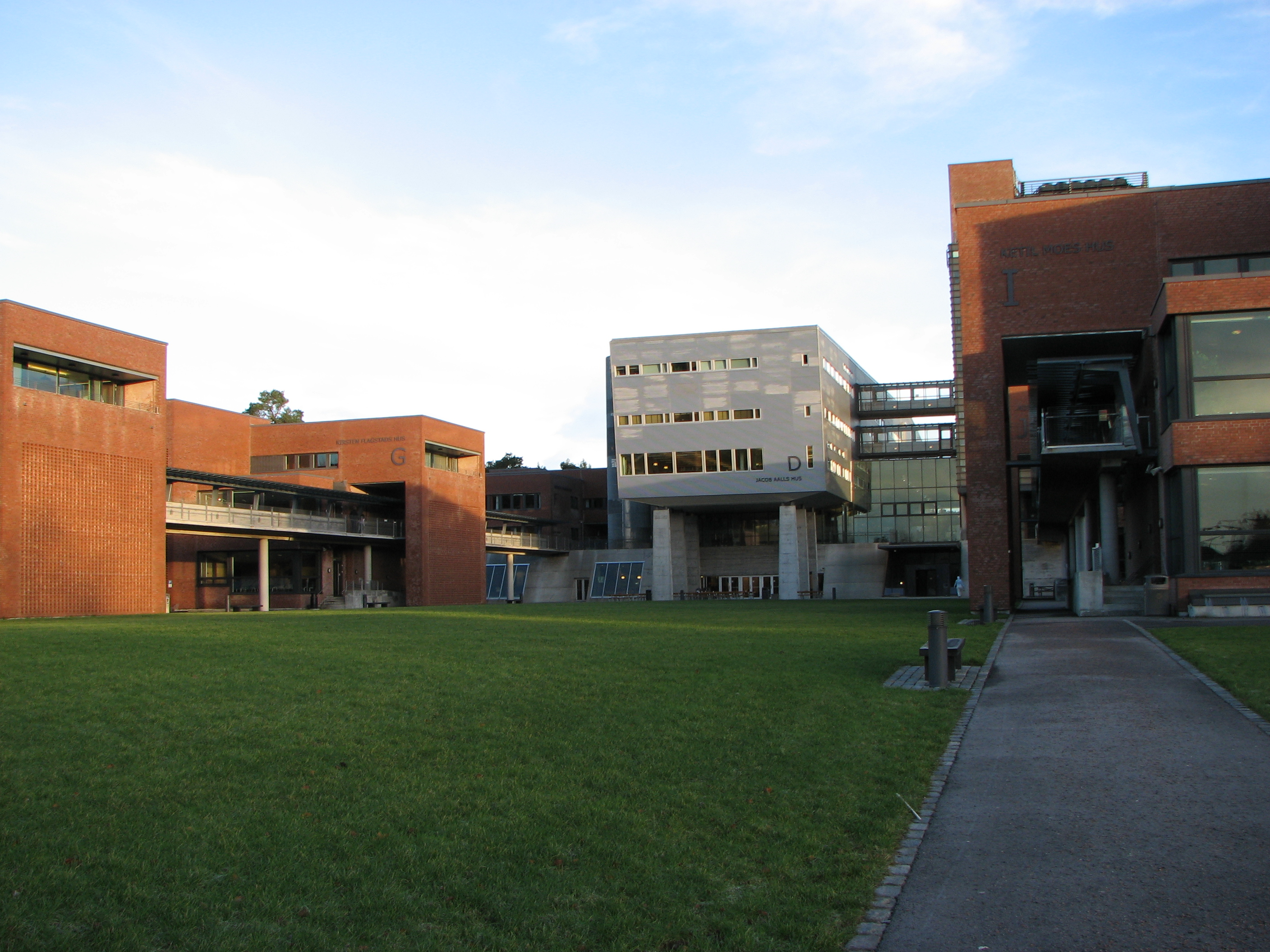
University of Agder

Name	Type	Location
Fagerholt skole	Elementary	Gimlekollen
Havlimyra skole	Junior High	Justvik
Justvik skole	Elementary	Justvik
Kongsgård skolesenter	Elementary	Kongsgård Allé
Kristiansand Cathedral School	High School	Oddemarka
Kristiansand International School	Elementary and Junior High	Kongsgård Allé
Lovisenlund skole	Elementary	Gimle
NLA Mediehøgskolen Gimlekollen	College	Gimlekollen
Oddemarka skole	Junior High	Oddemarka
Prestheia skole	Elementary	Gimle
Steinerskolen	Elementarty and Junior High	Lund
Universitetet i Agder	University	Gimle
Frank Wild Minneskole (memorial)	Elementary	Marvika

== Religion ==
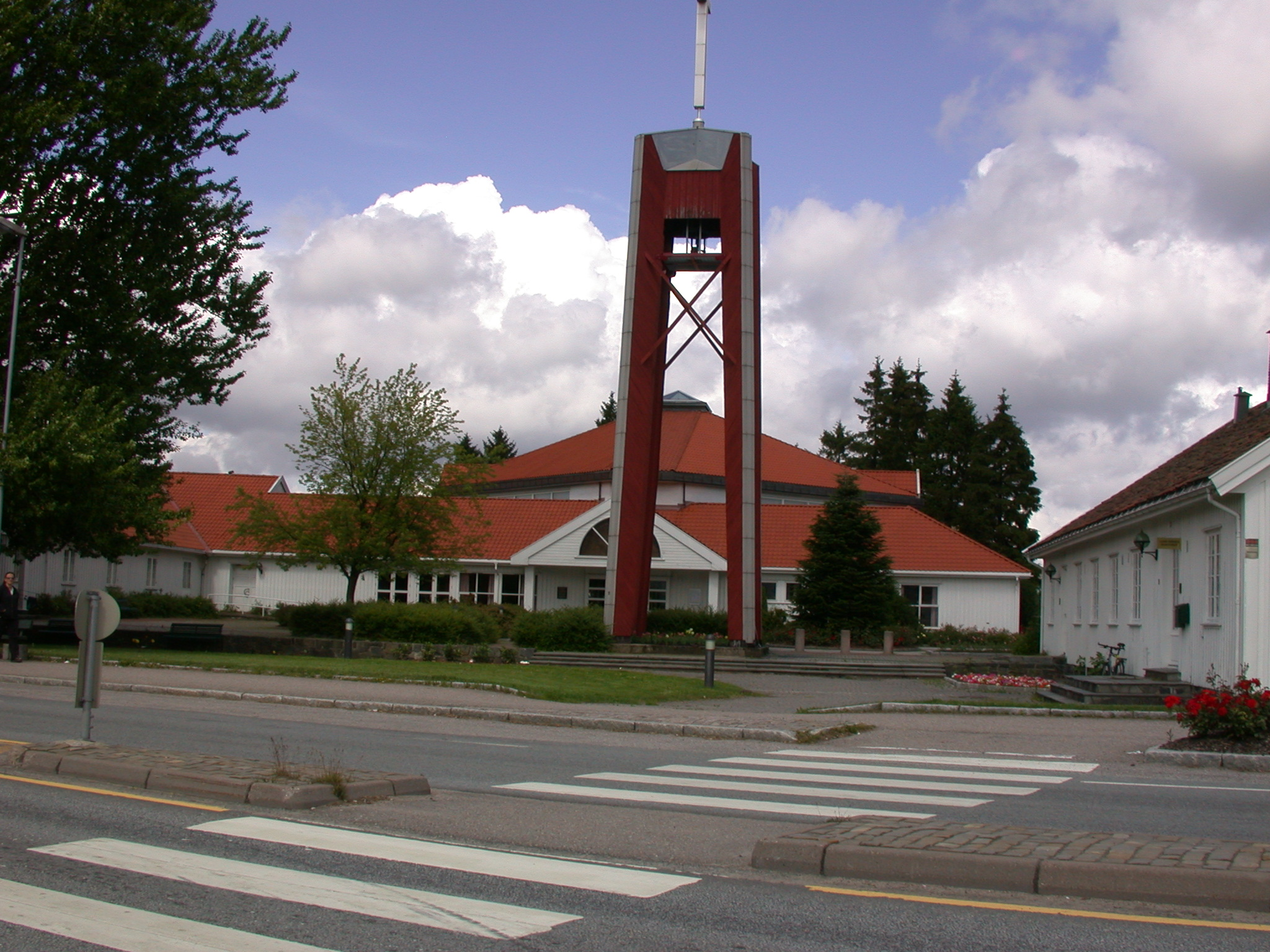
Lund church

Lund Church is a church at Valhalla in the Lund district. The church has a capacity of 600 people and there is no graveyard with the church. It opened in 1987 and is built out of bricks.

Oddernes Church is located with Oddemarka and the university. It was built when Lund was a part of the former municipality Oddernes, which today is a borough in the city. Even though Oddernes church is not located at Oddernes, it has kept the name such as other landmarks around the city where Oddernes used to be. The church was built in 1630 but a new roof was built in 1788. The church has a capacity of 510 people and there is a graveyard located with the church. It was built by bricks and stone and is the oldest building in Kristiansand.

Justvik Church has a capacity of 270 people and was built in 1996 with no graveyard with the church.

== Transportation ==
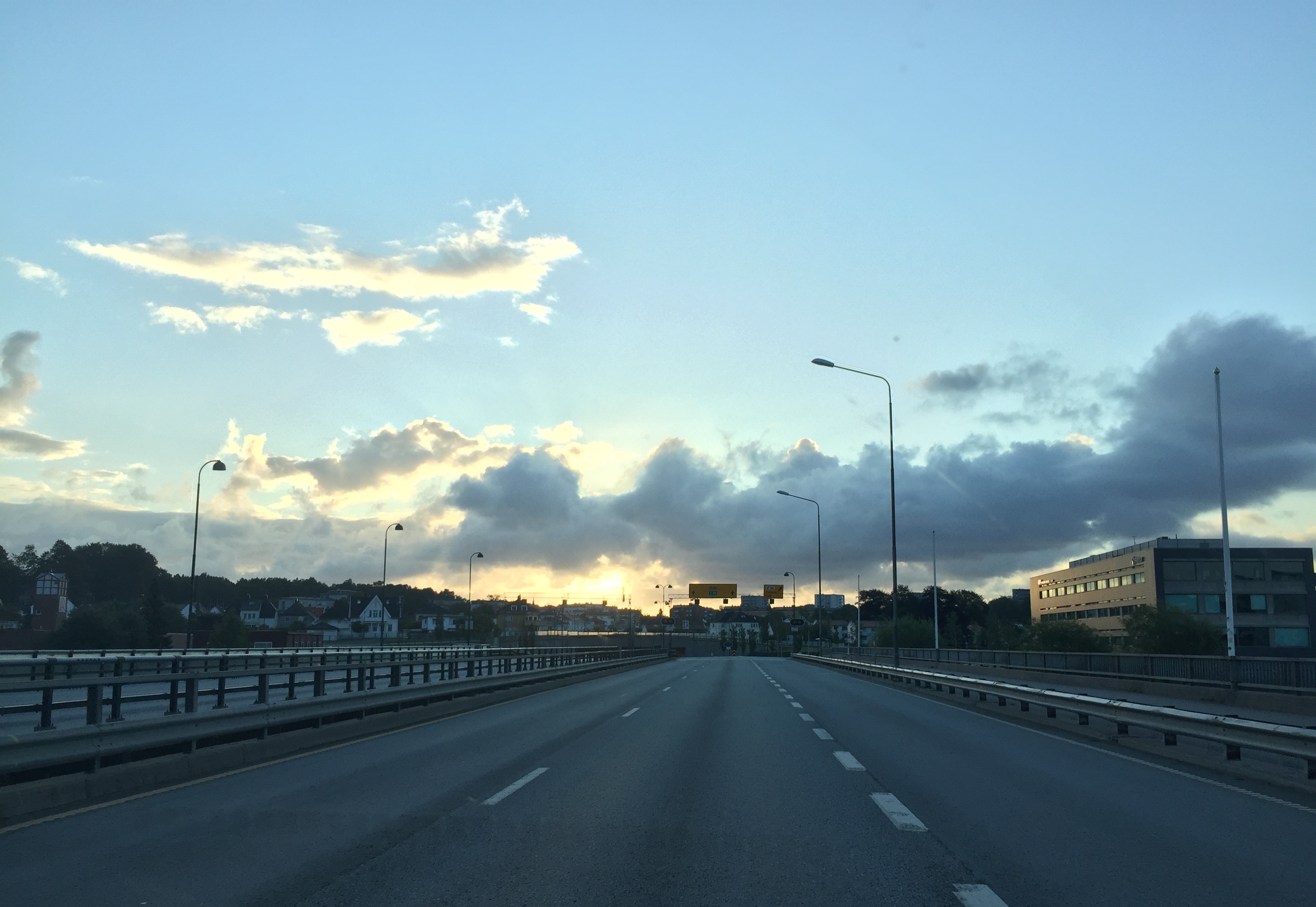
European road 18 over Otra river with Lund in the end

=== Road ===
European route E18 is the main road and is a highway. While other roads like County Road 471 goes from the University to downtown Kristiansand. As for County Road 1 goes from Vennesla and ends in Lund centrum. County Road 1 goes next to Otra river.

List of notable roads in Grim
Route	Destination
E18	Vige - Gimle - Downtown
Fv1	Lund centrum - Sødal - Strai - Vennesla
Fv23	Marvika - Oddemarka
Fv452	Vige - Gimlekollen - Justvik - Ålefjær
Fv453	Tveit - Ålefjær - Vennesla
Fv471	Bjørndalssletta - Lund centrum - Downtown

=== Bus ===
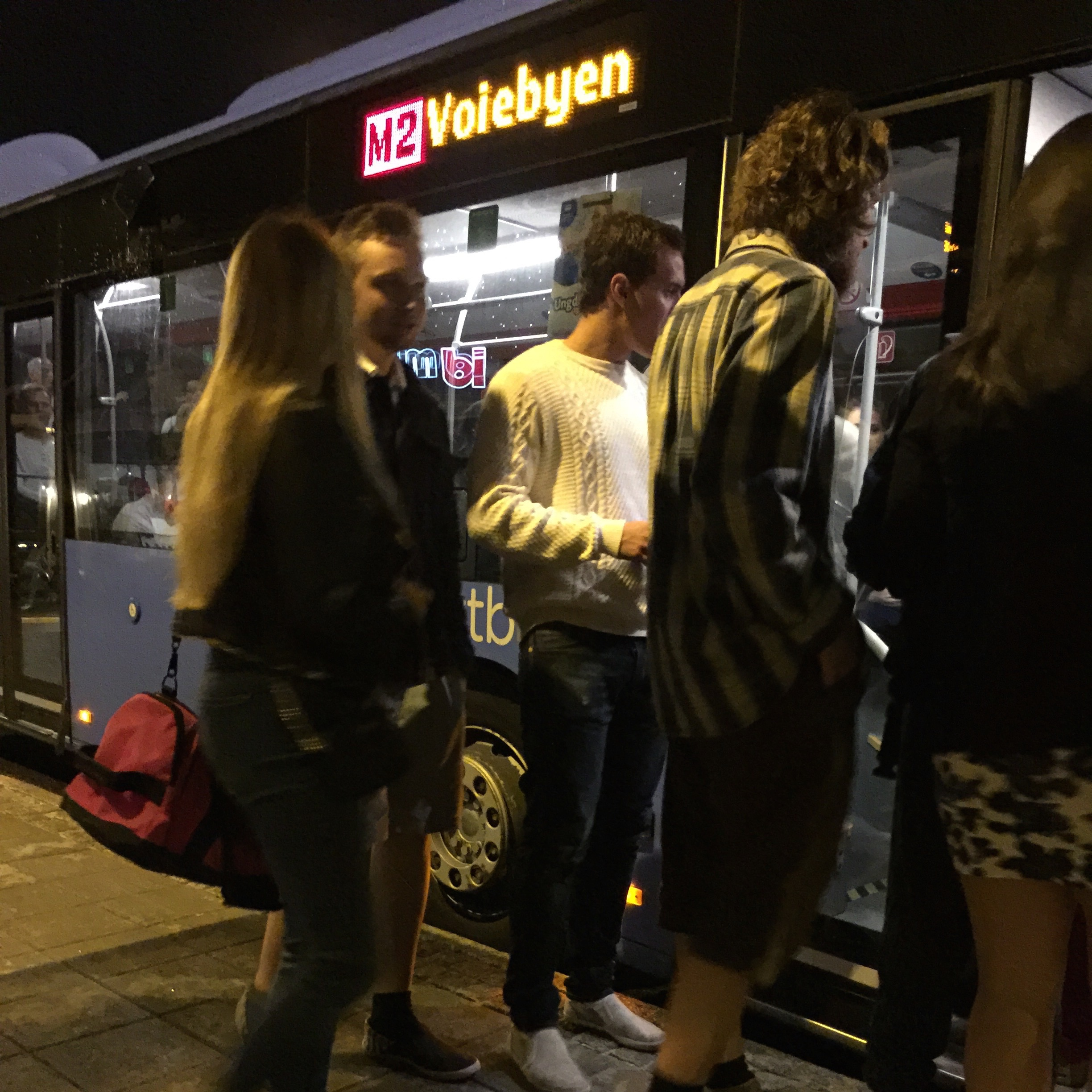
Bus bound for Voiebyen at Lund Torv

Bus transportation to Lund
Line	Destination
01	Kvadraturen - Lund - Sørlandsparken
13	Grimsmyra - Kuholmen - Lund
19	Suldalen - Lund-UiA
22	Kvadraturen - Gimlekollen
23	Kvadraturen - Justvik-Jærnesheia
23	Kvadraturen - Justvik-Jærnesheia / Ålefjær
29	Kvadraturen - Justvik-Ålefjær
31	Kvadraturen - Sødal - Vennesla

Bus transportation through Lund via UiA
Line	Destination
A1	Kvadraturen - Sørlandssenteret
D2	Voiebyen - UiA
D3	Slettheia - UiA
M1	Flekkerøy - Sørlandsparken Dyreparken-IKEA
M2	Voiebyen - Hånes
M2	Voiebyen - Hånes - Lauvåsen
M3	Slettheia - Søm
05	Andøya - UiA
09	Bråvann - UiA
15	Tinnheia - UiA
17	Hellemyr - Tømmerstø
17	Hellemyr - Tømmerstø - Frikstad
17	Hellemyr - UiA
17	Kvadraturen - Tømmerstø
18	Hellemyr - Tømmerstø Odderhei-Holte
18	Kvadraturen - Tømmerstø Odderhei-Holte
35	Kristiansand - Kjevik - Brattvollsheia
35	Kristiansand - Kjevik - Brattvollsheia / Grødum
36	Kristiansand - Tveit - Grødum
37	Kristiansand - Birkeland
40	Årosskogen-Høllen - UiA
42	Langenes - UiA
45	Stokkeland-Nodelandsheia - UiA
46	Finsland - UiA
50	Tangvall - Langenes - UiA
200	Mandal - UiA
200	Farsund - Mandal - UiA
200	Lista - Farsund - Mandal - Kjevik

Bus transportation via Oddernesbrua
Line	Destination
A2	Kvadraturen - Hånes
A3	Kvadraturen - Søm
A18	Sykehuset - Tømmerstø Odderhei-Holte
A26	Voiebyen - Sørlandsparken Dyreparken-IKEA

== Media gallery ==
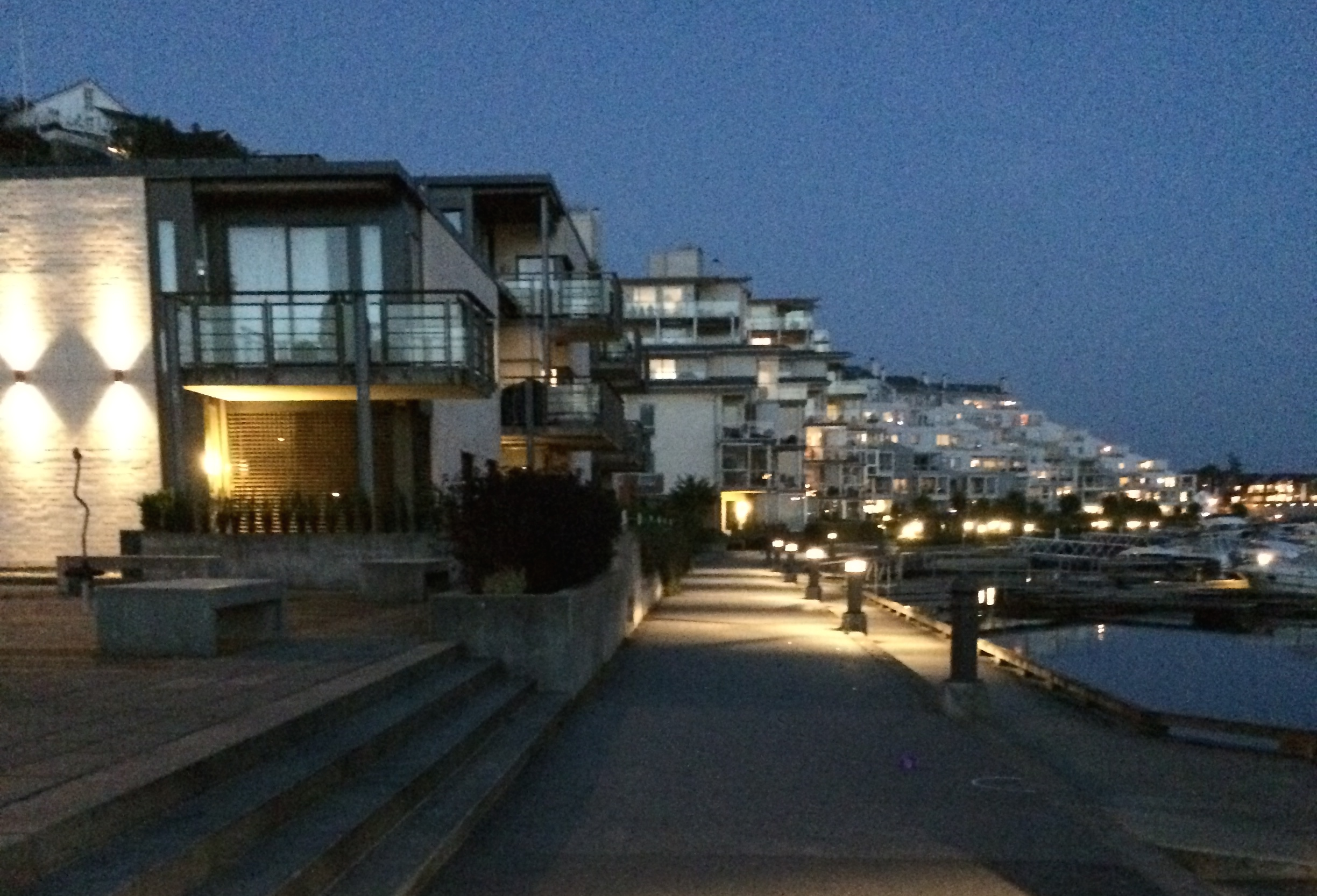
Lund shore

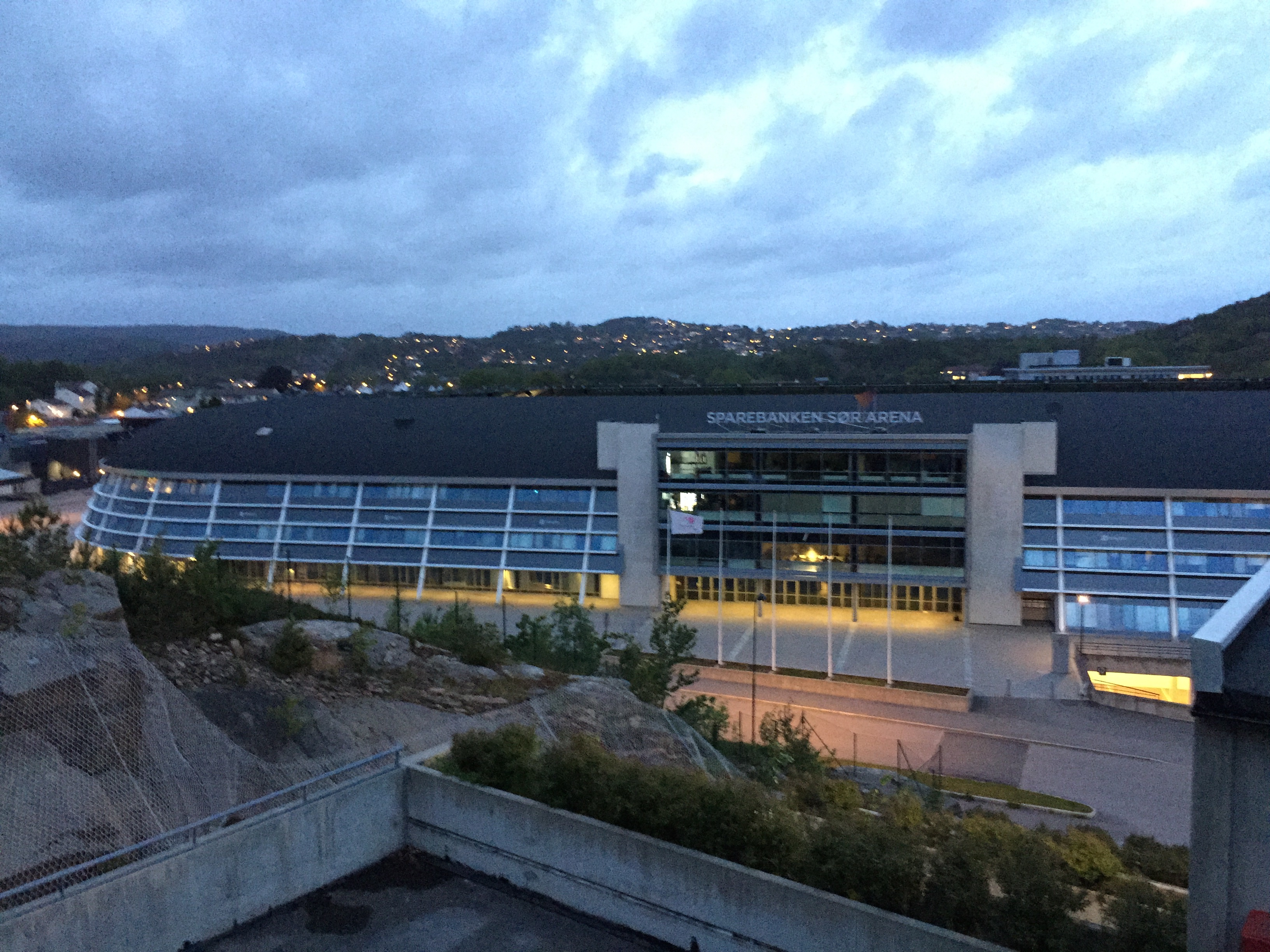
Sør Arena

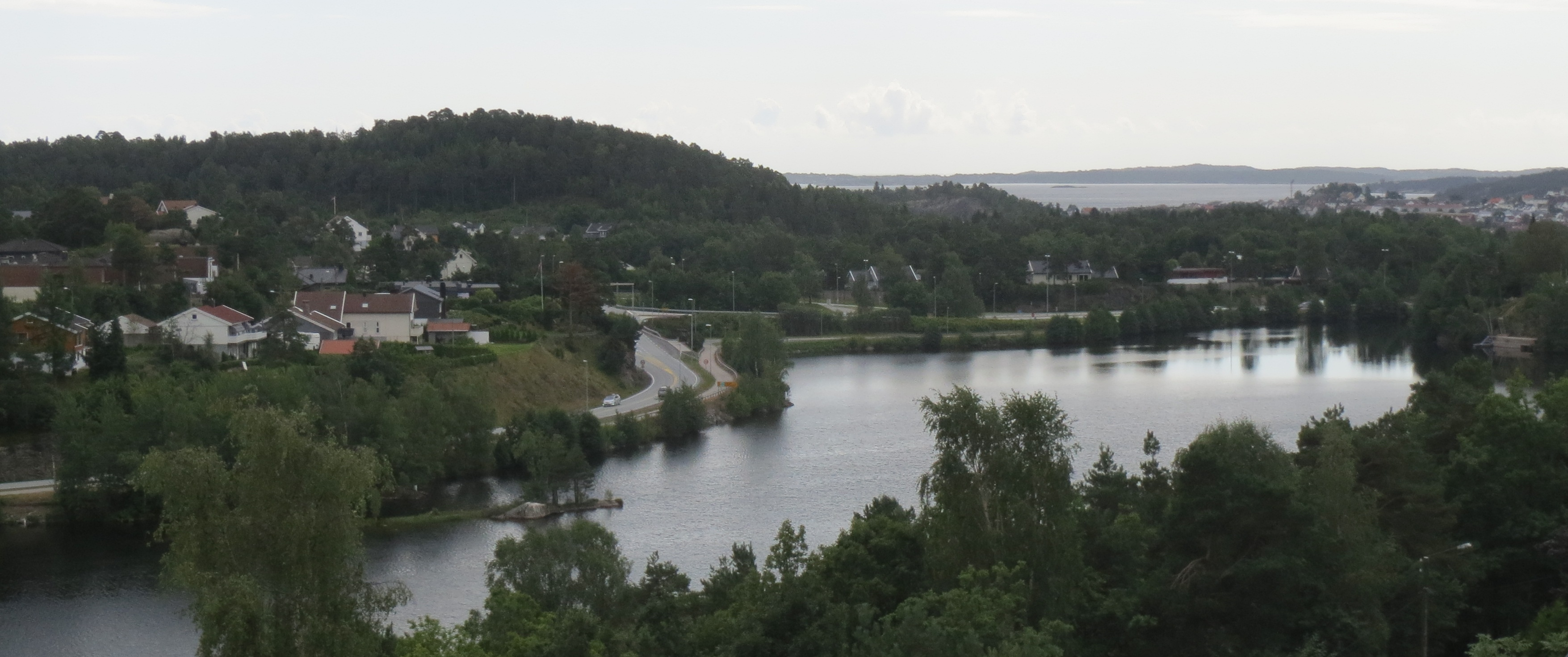
Vollevannet

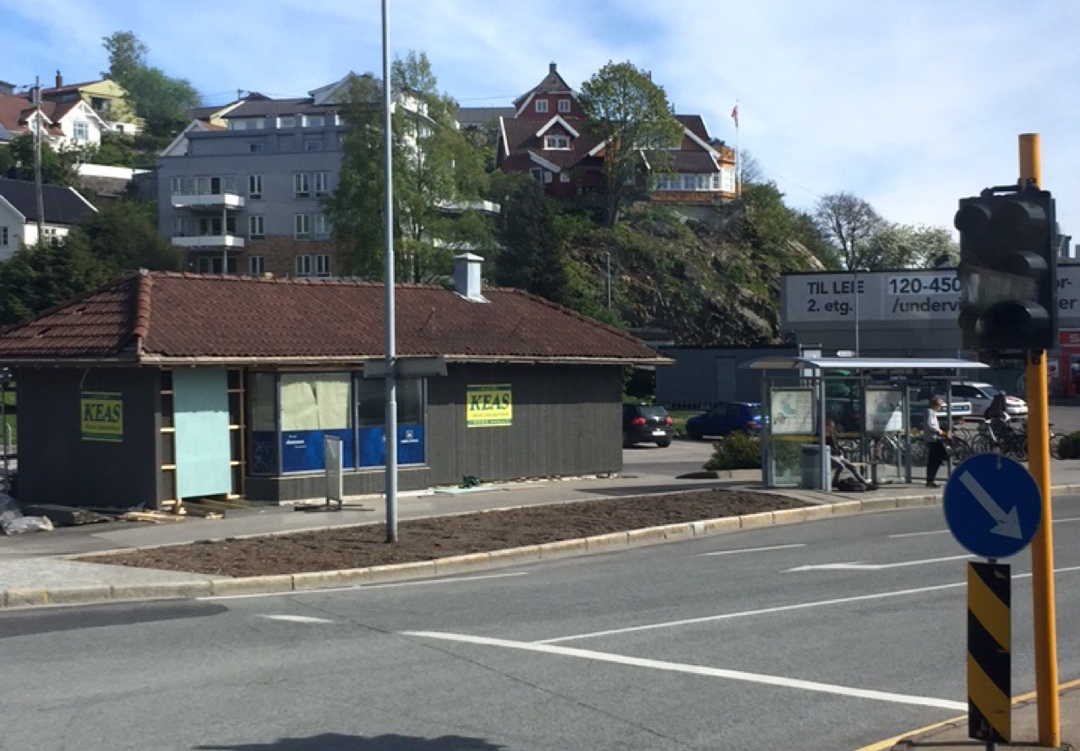
Lund Torv

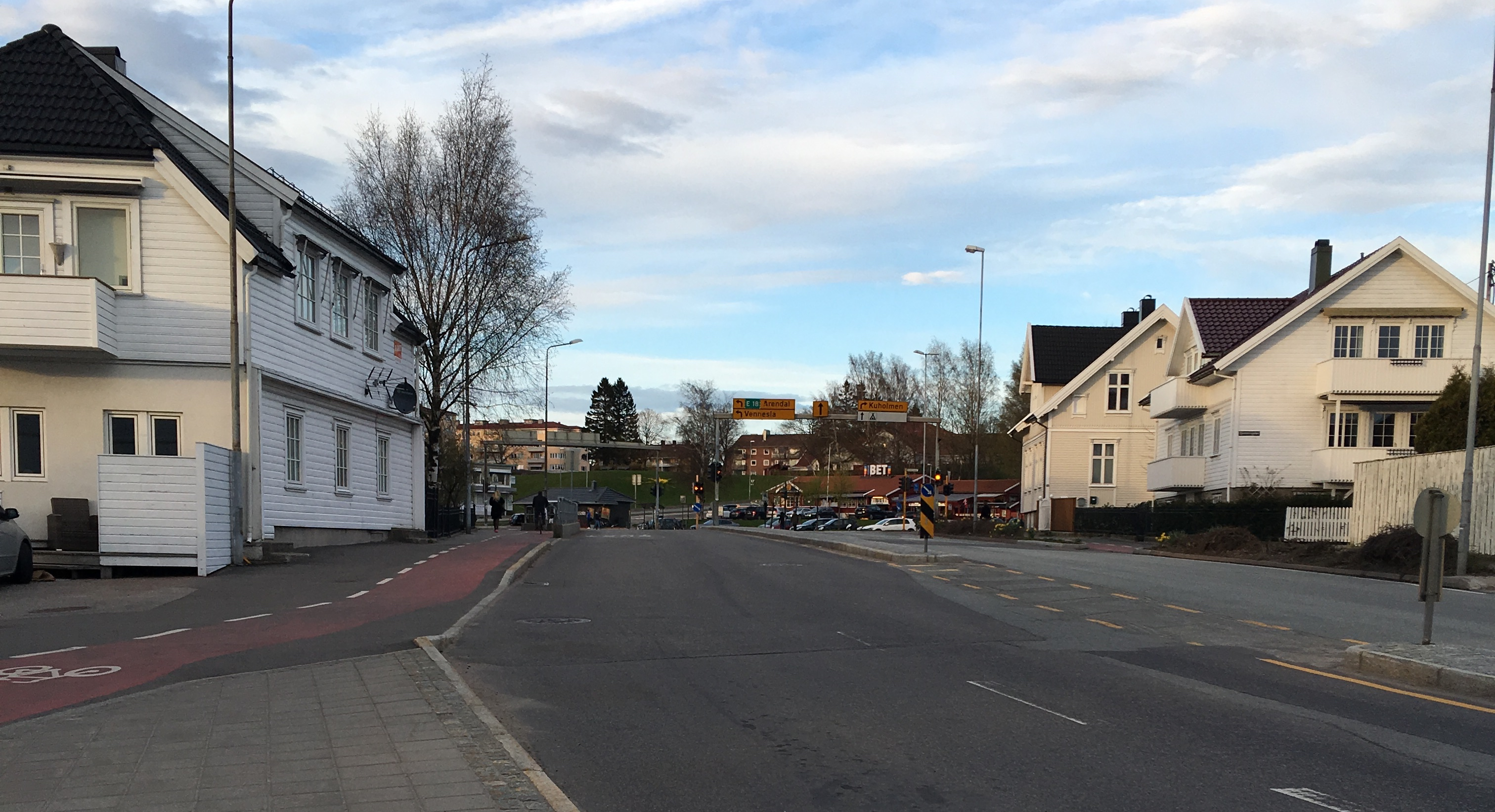
Lund Torv

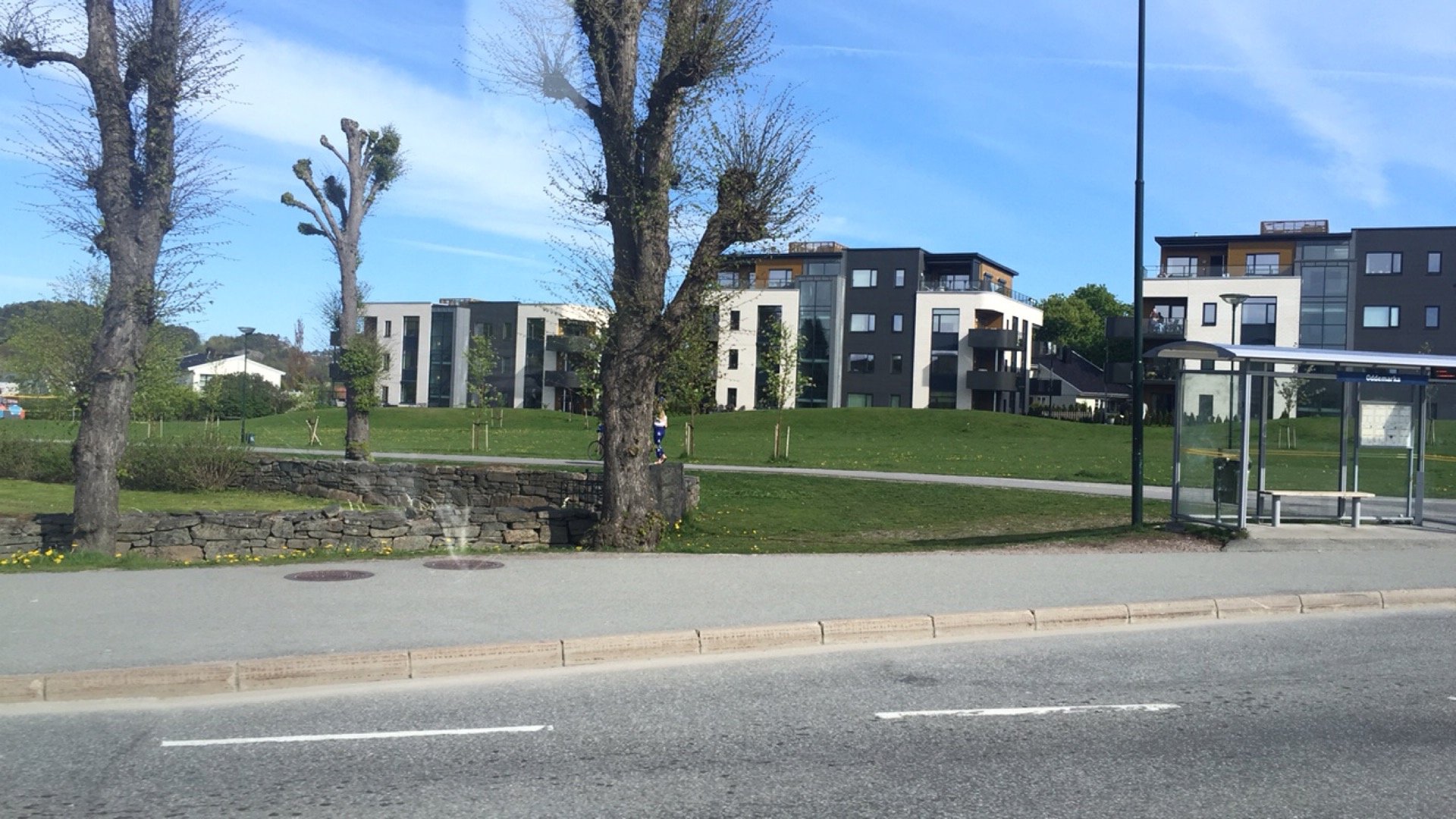
Oddemarka

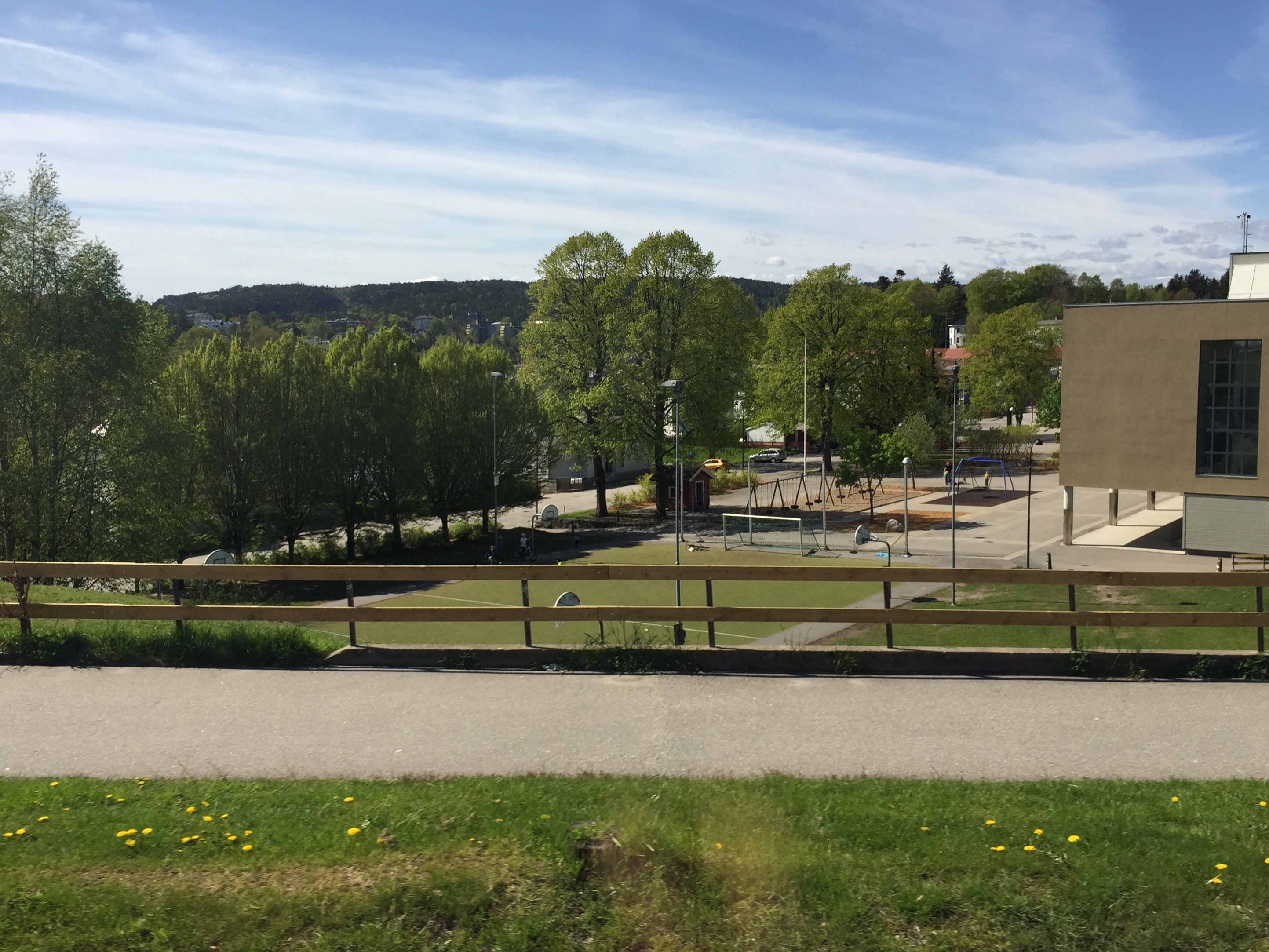
Lovisenlund

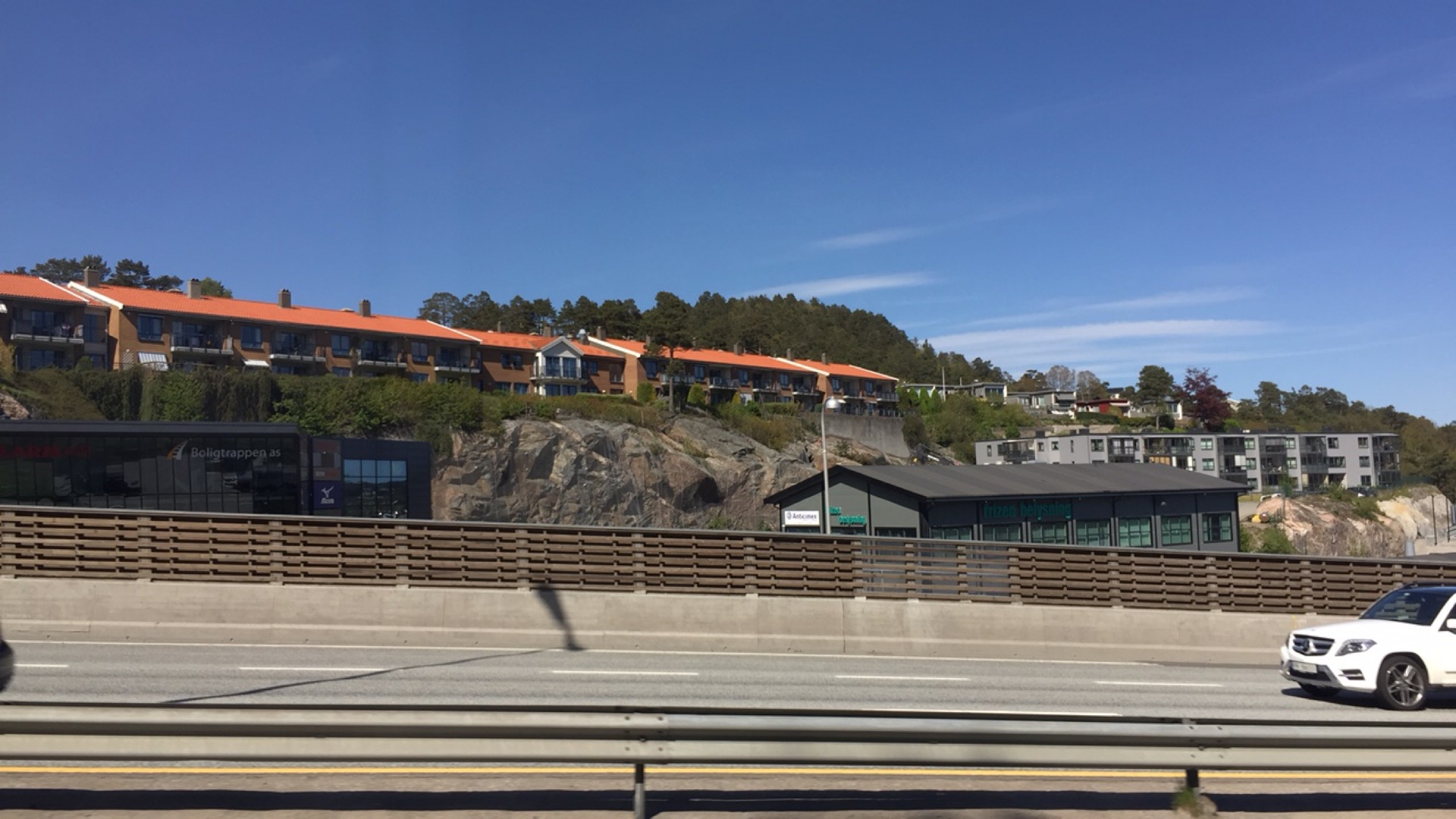
Vige

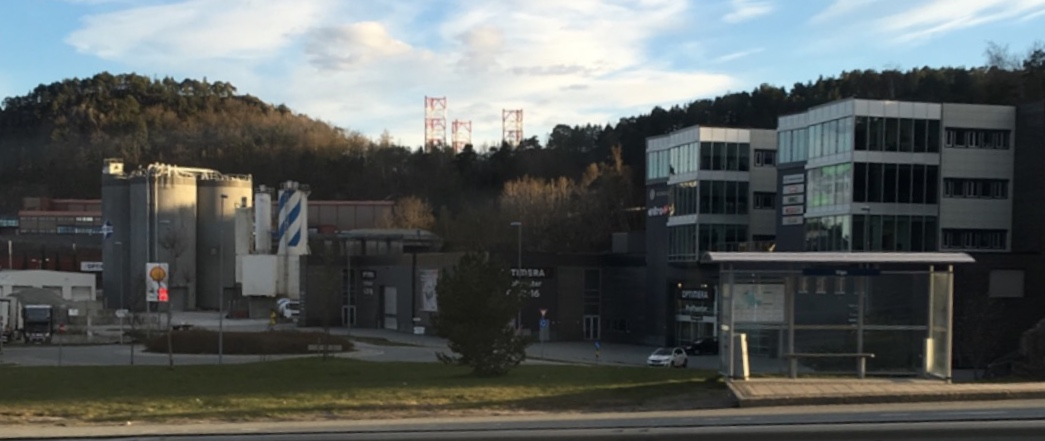
Vige

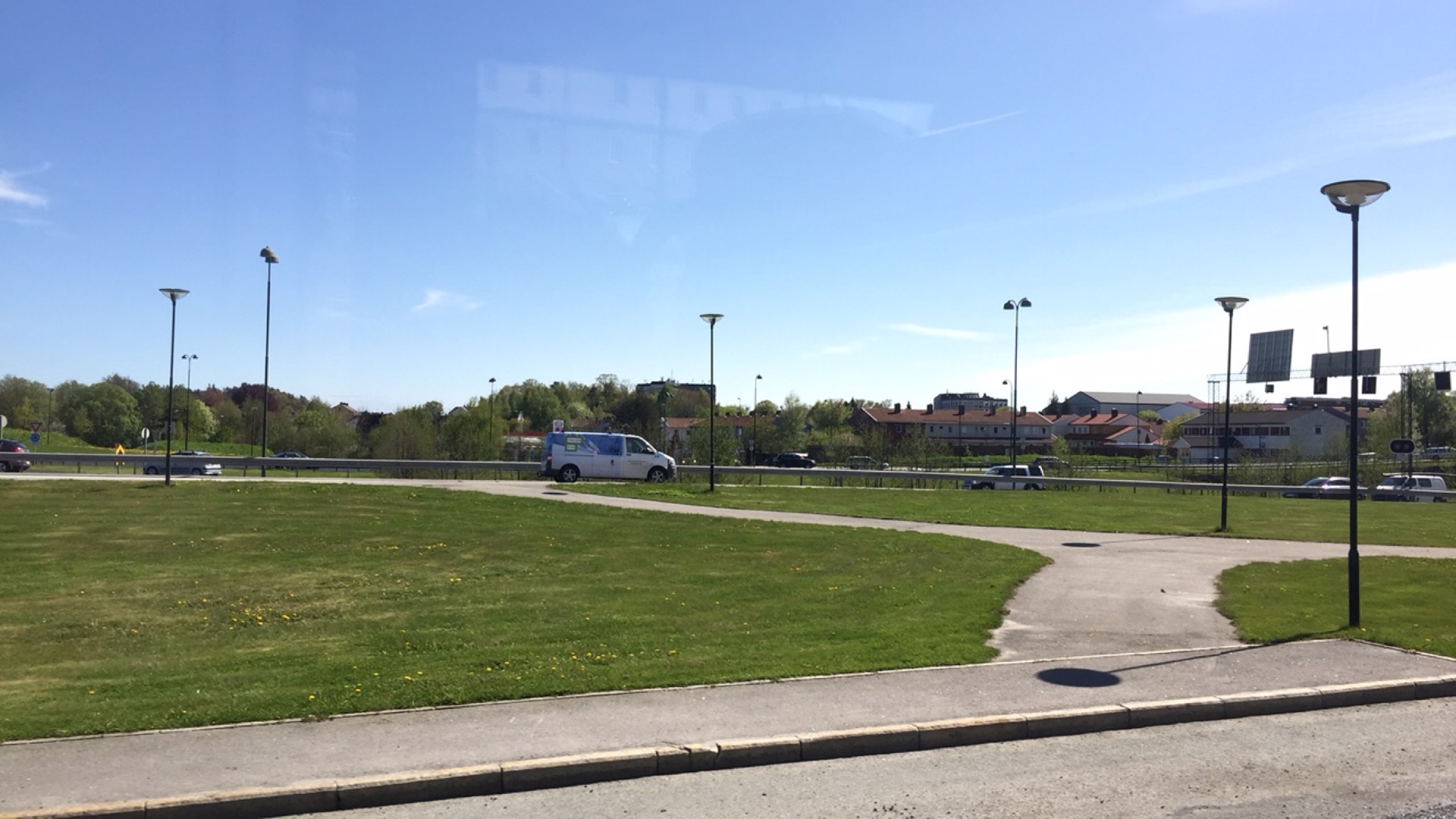
Bjørndalsletta

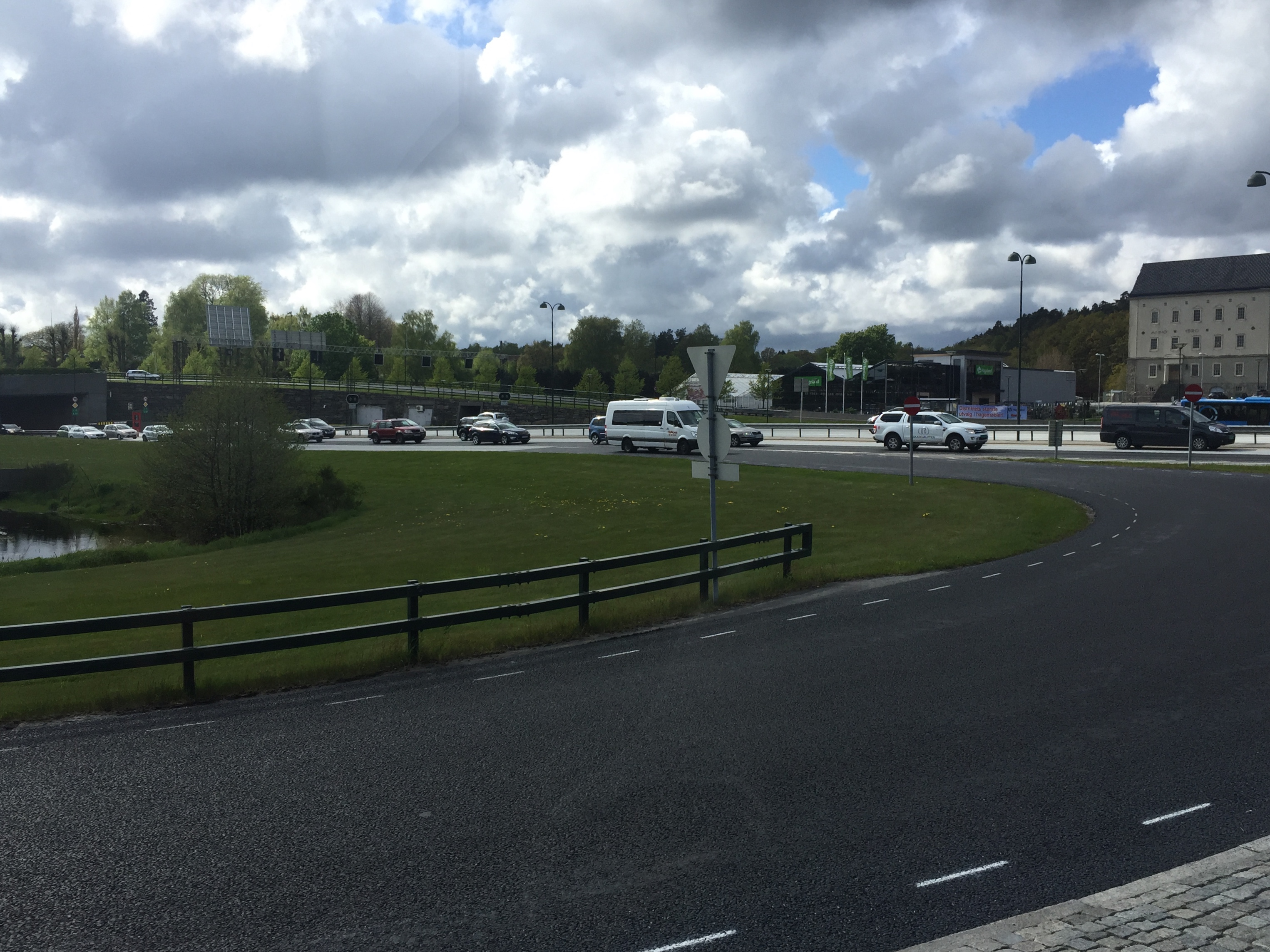
Bjørndalsletta with Prestebekken

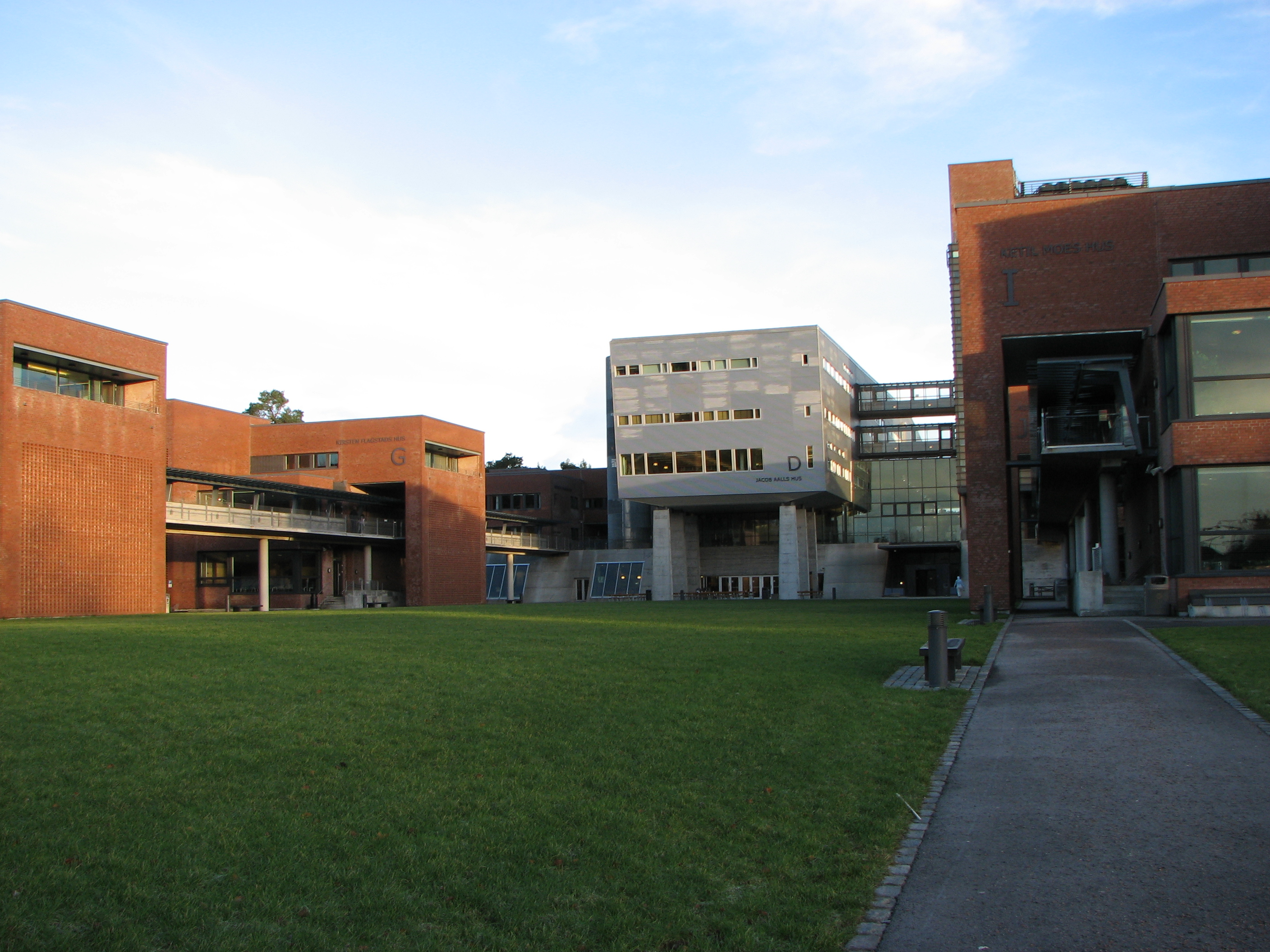
University of Agder

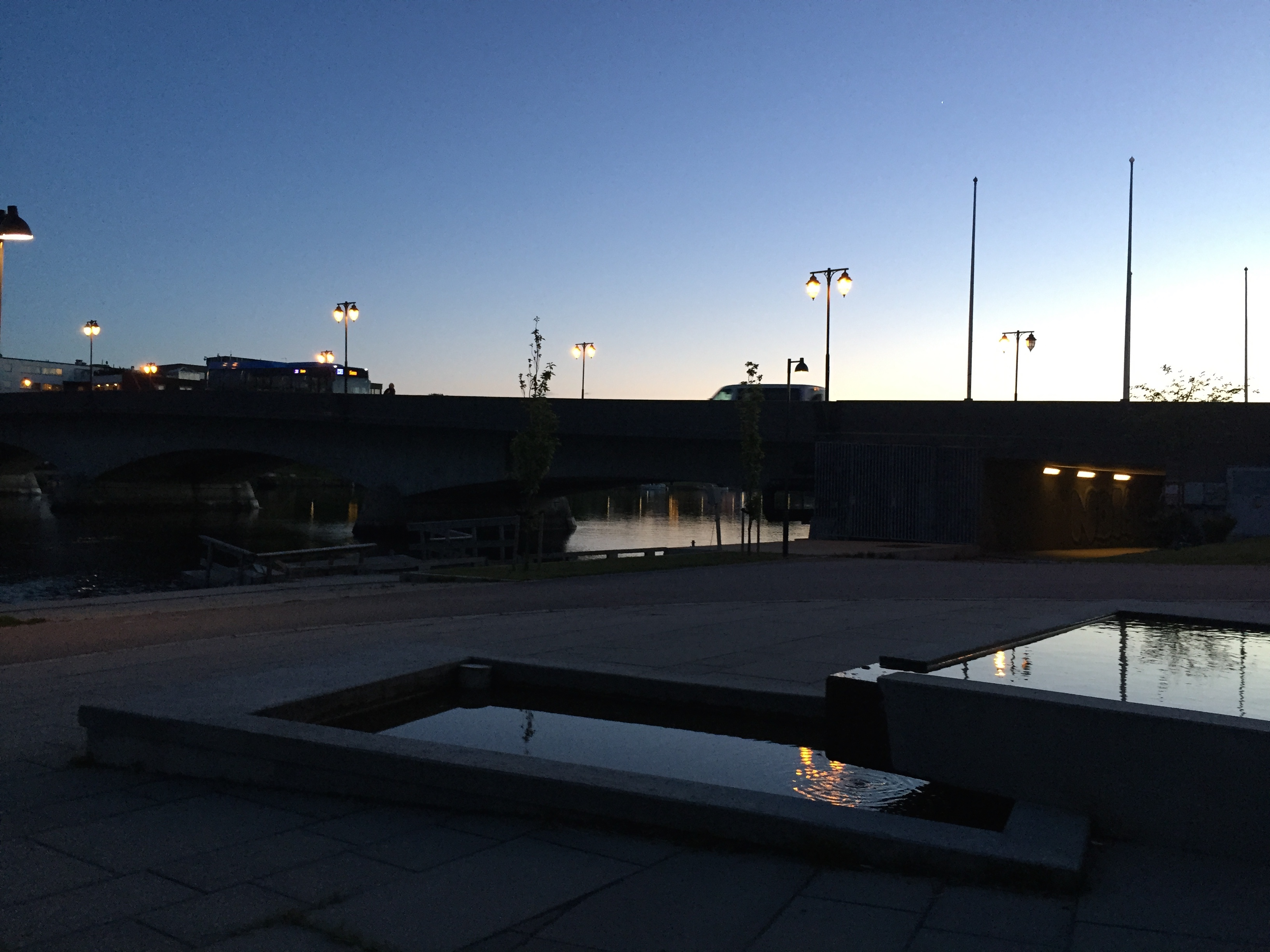
Lundsbroa from Kvadraturen to Lund

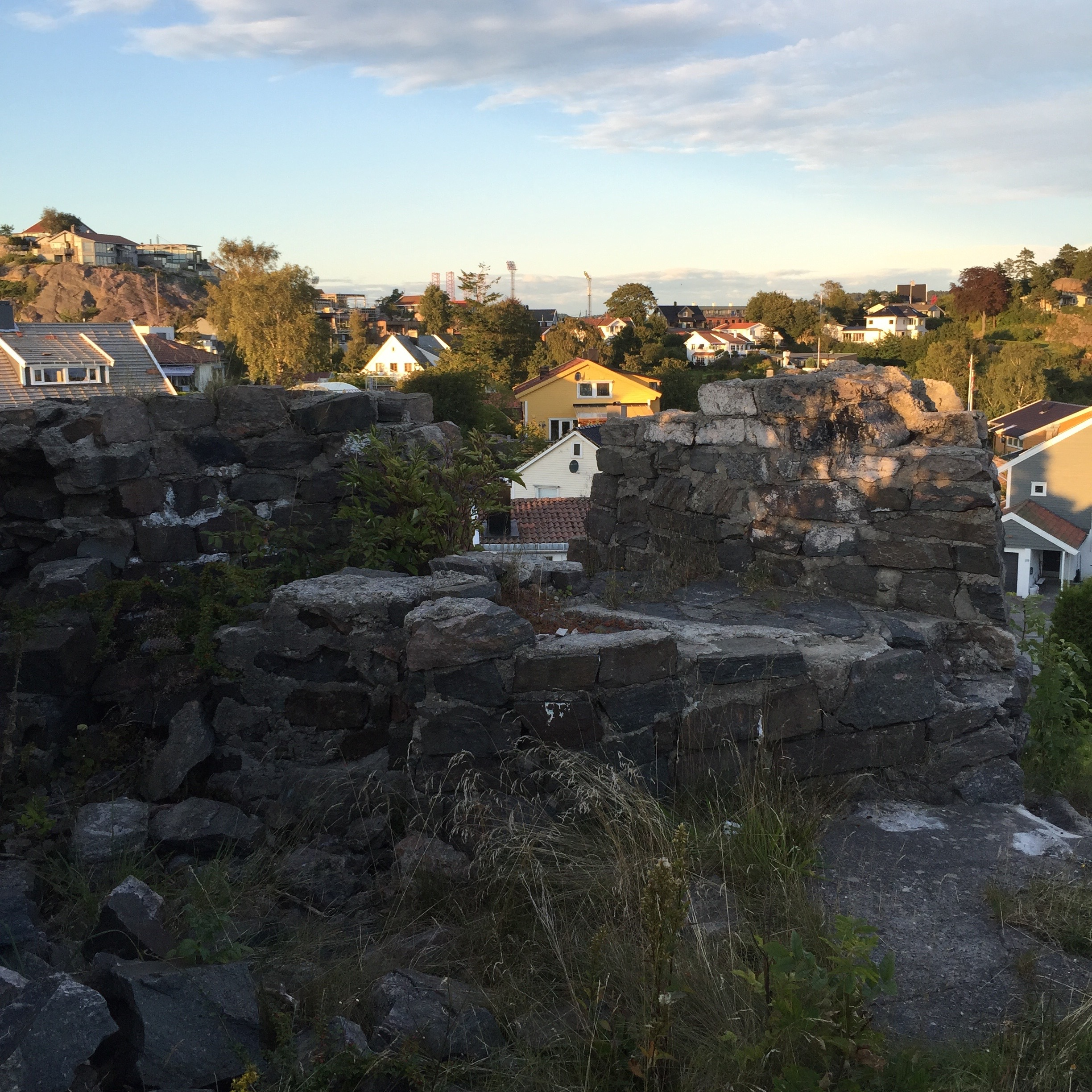
Galgeberg

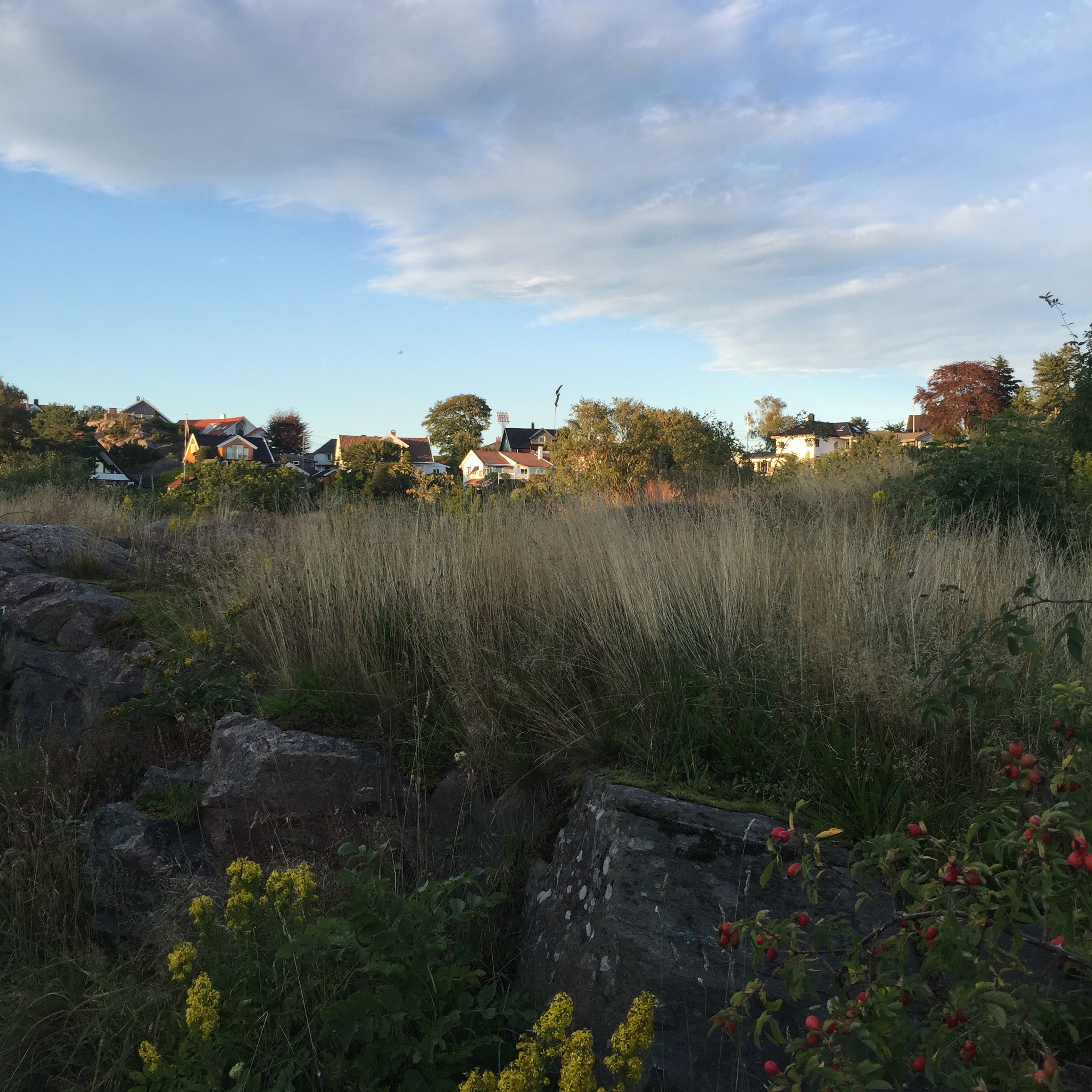
Galgeberg

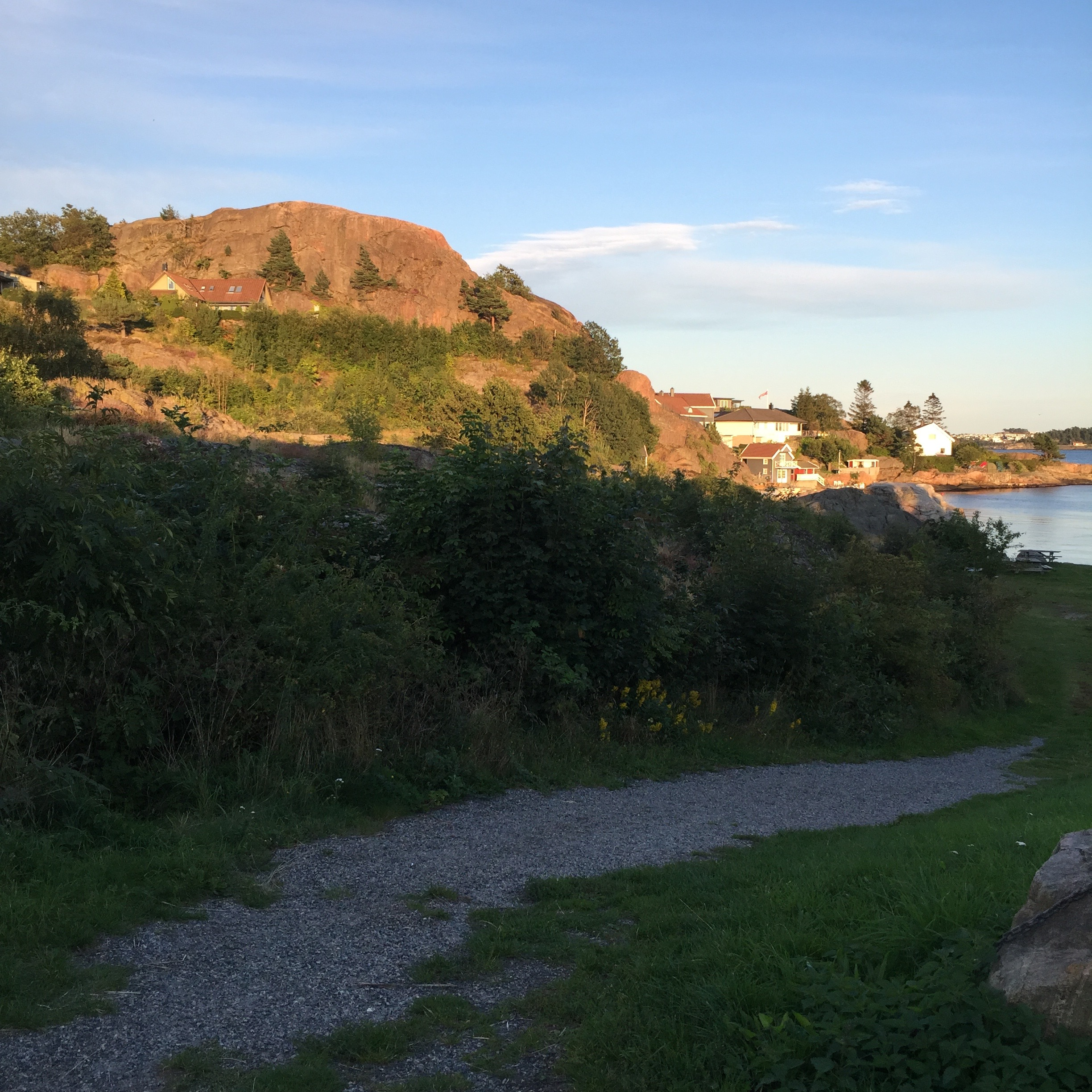
Marvika

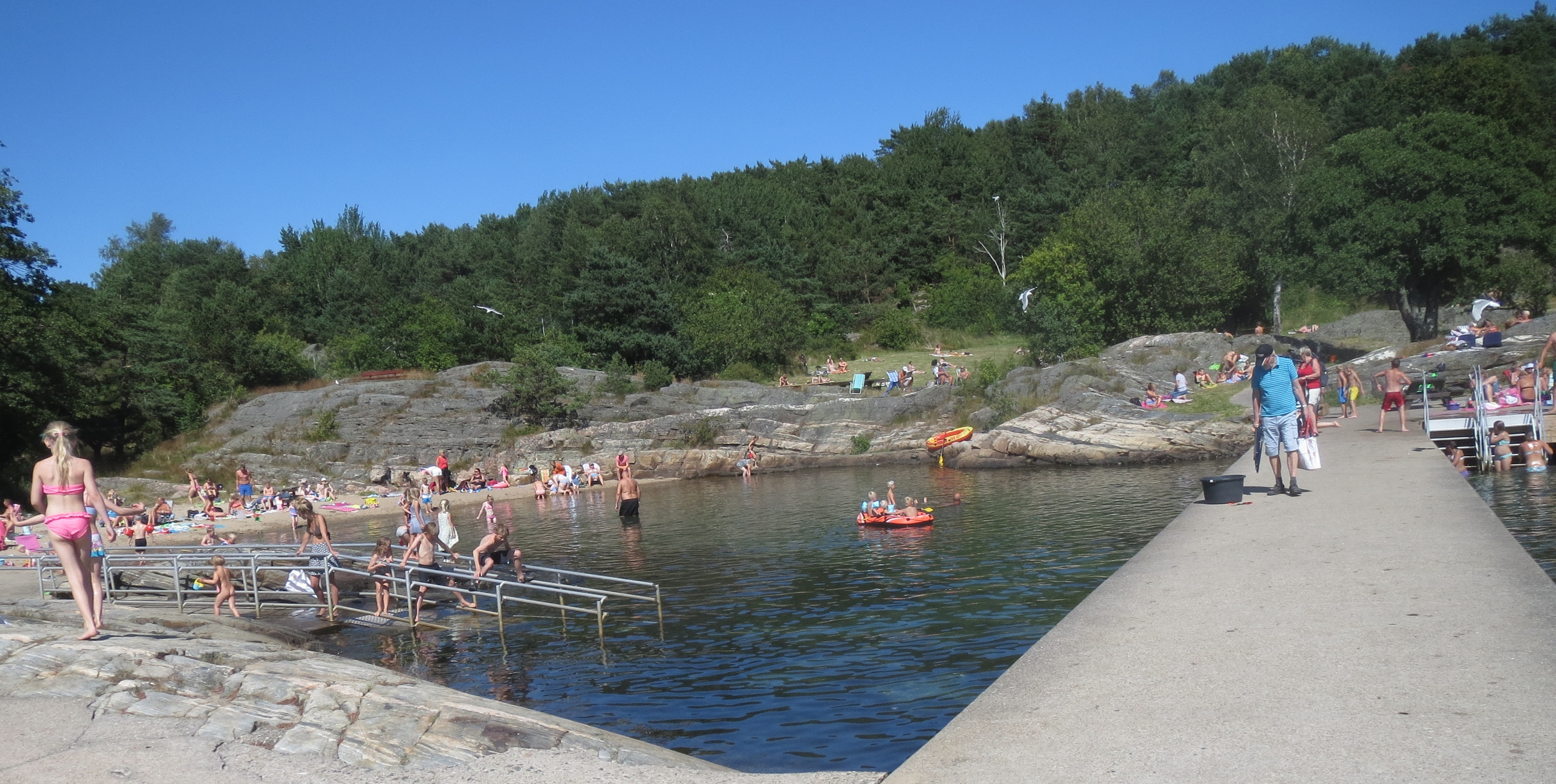
Bertesbukta

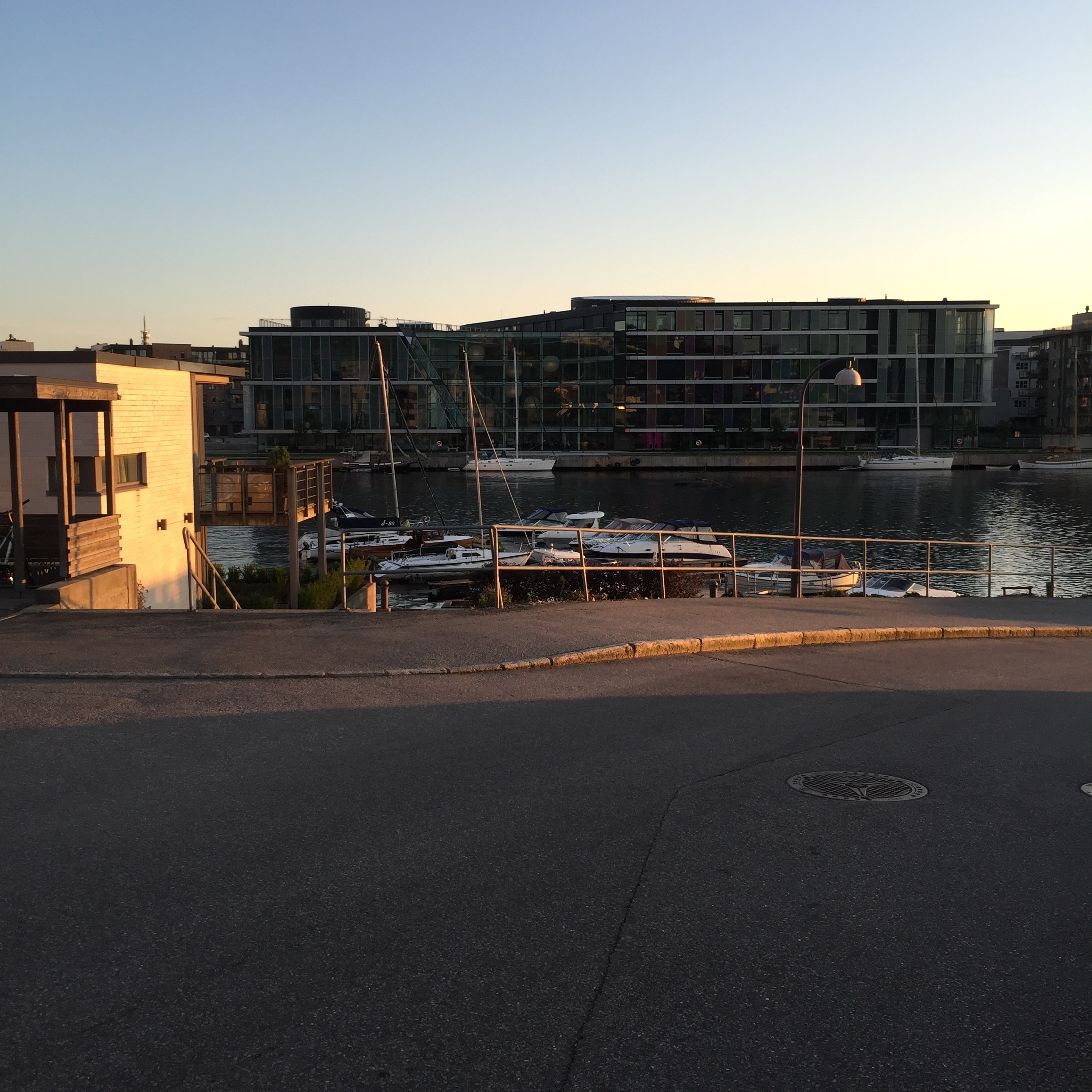
Tangen High School from Høivold Brygge

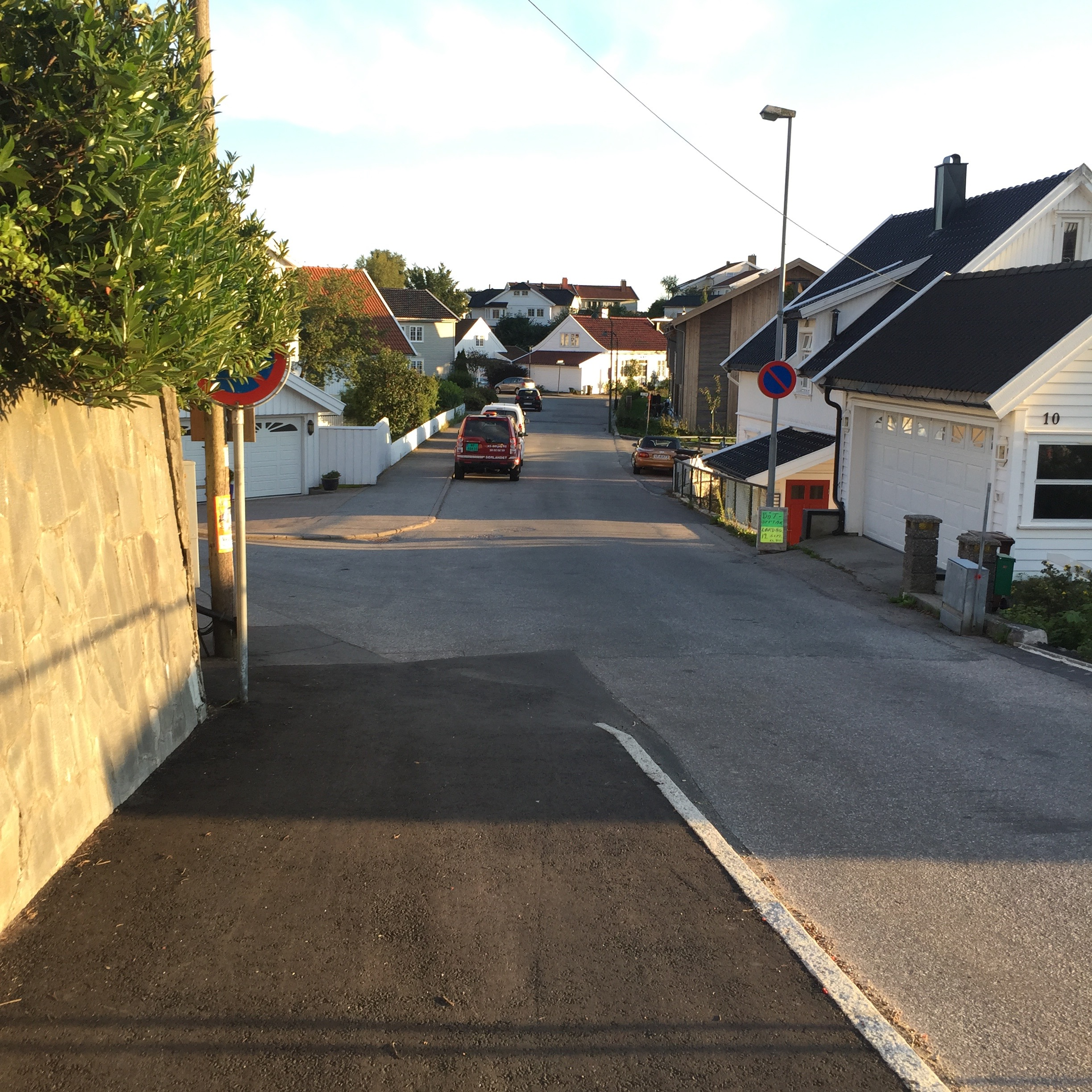
Kuholmen

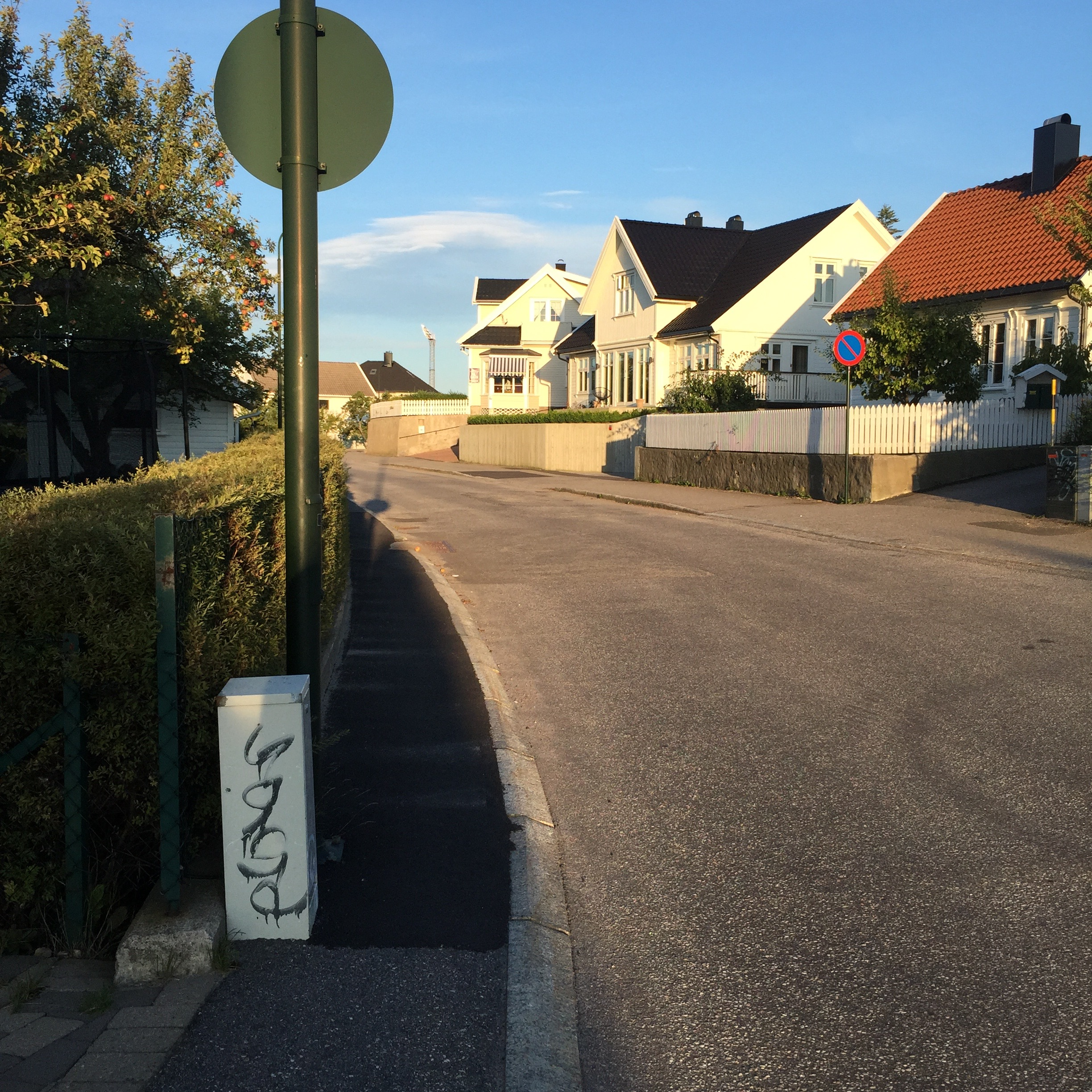
Vindmøllegangen

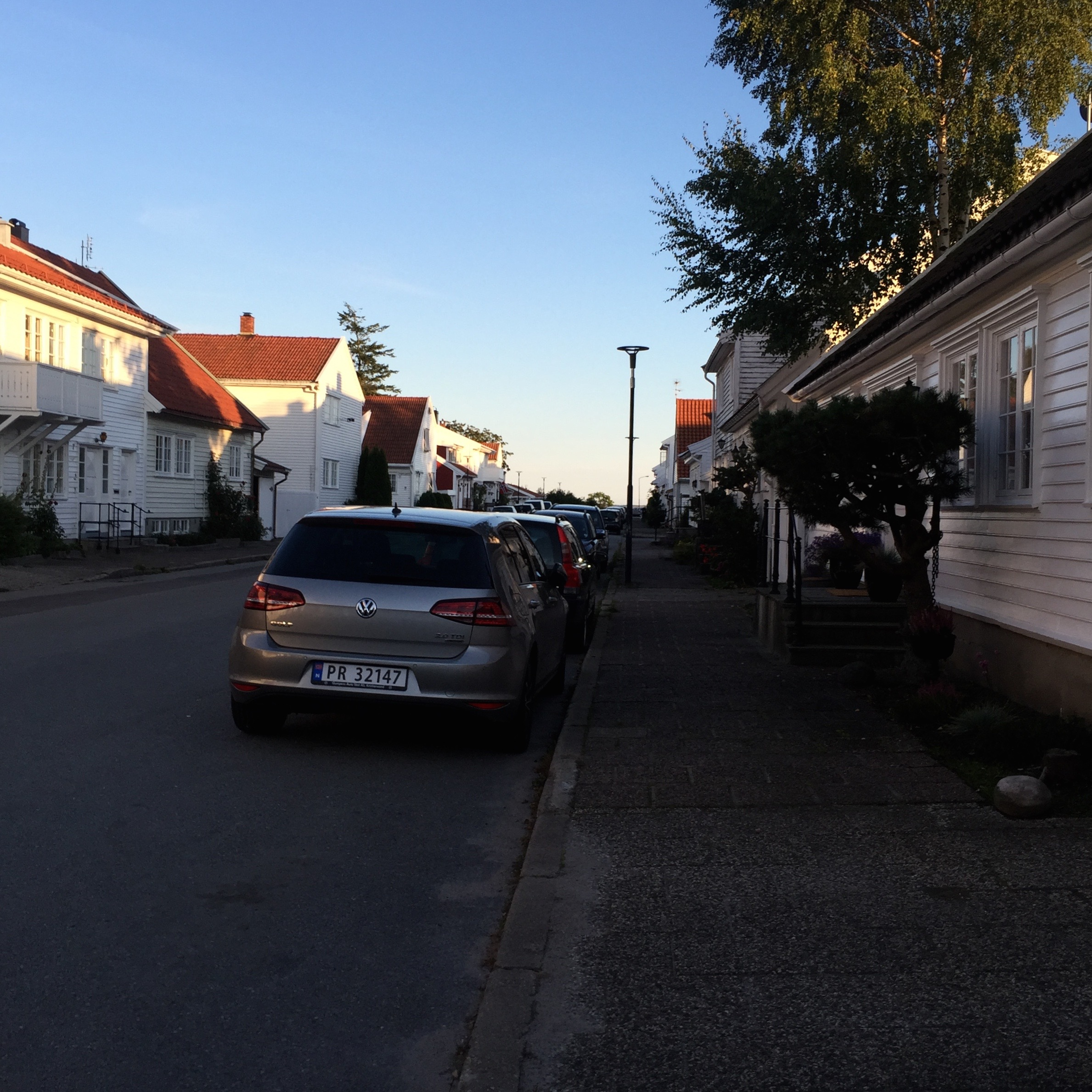
Hamreheia

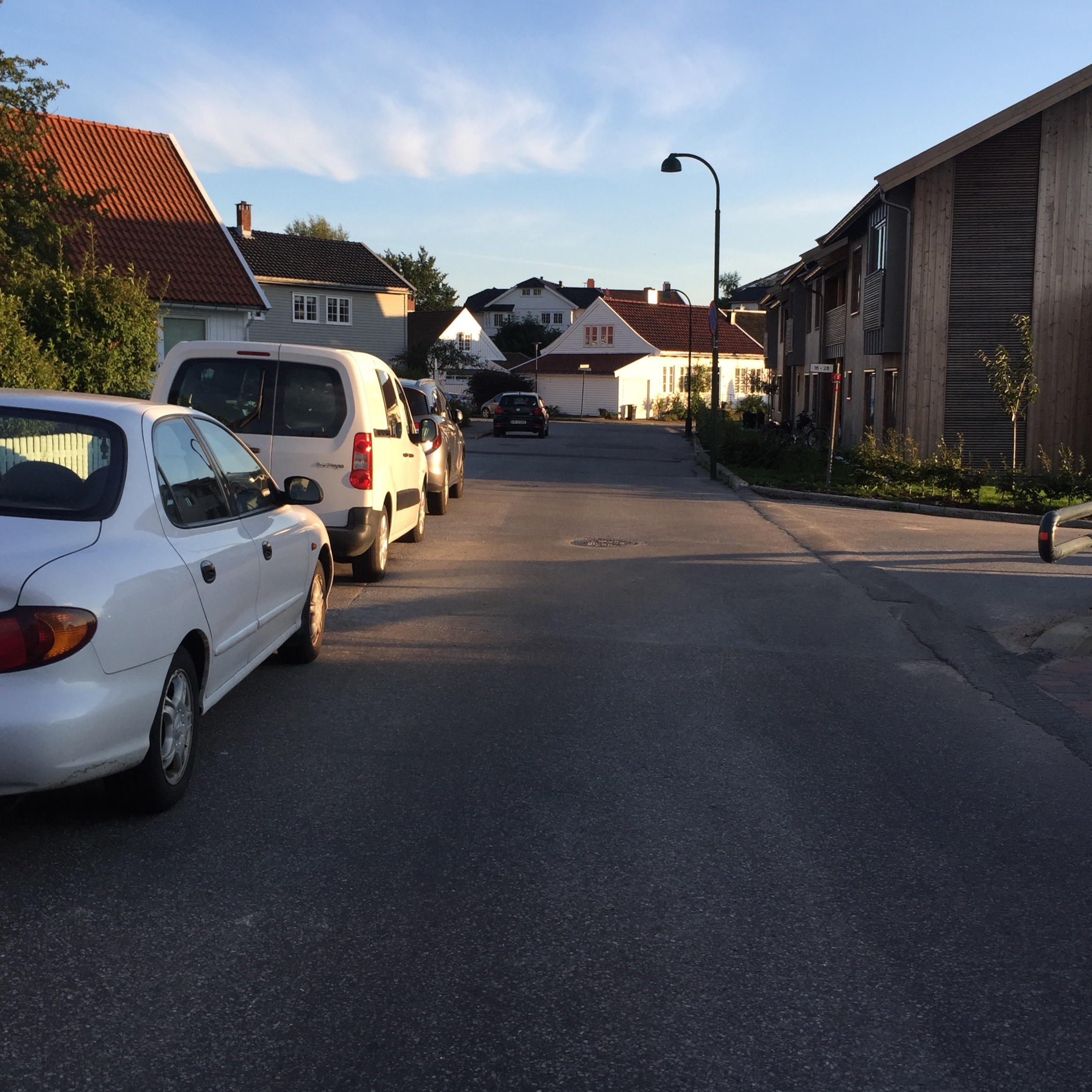
Randesunds gate

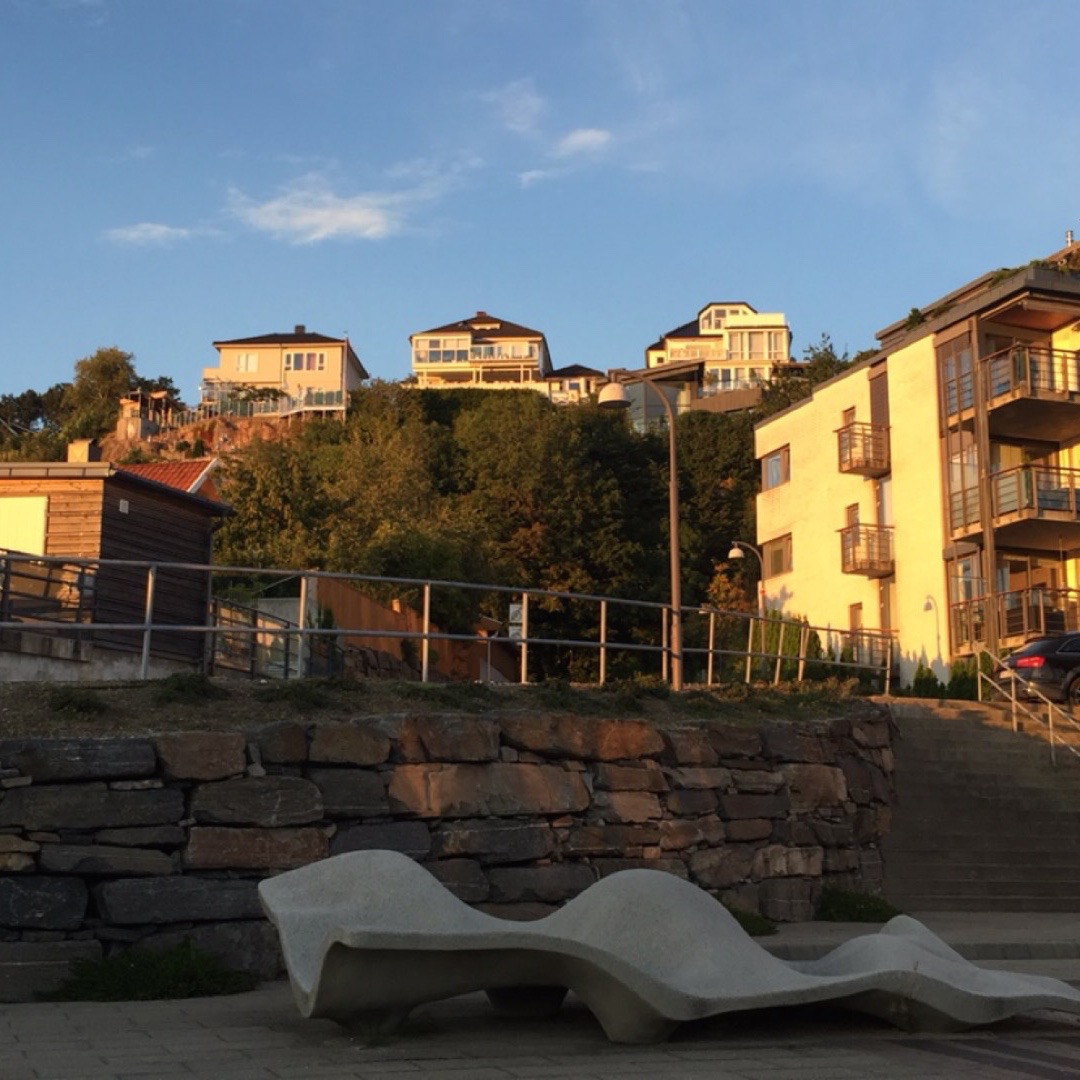
Lahalle

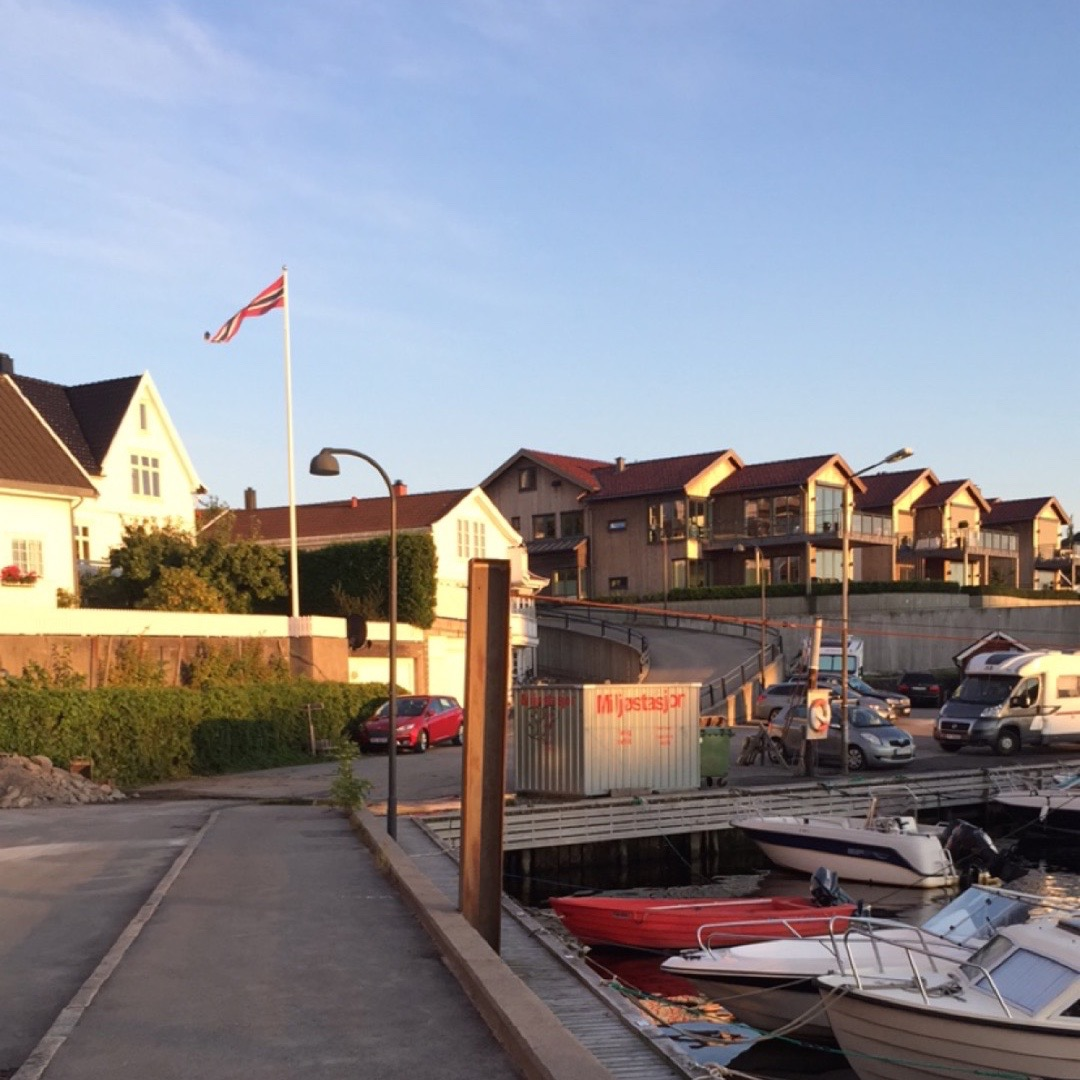
Presteviken

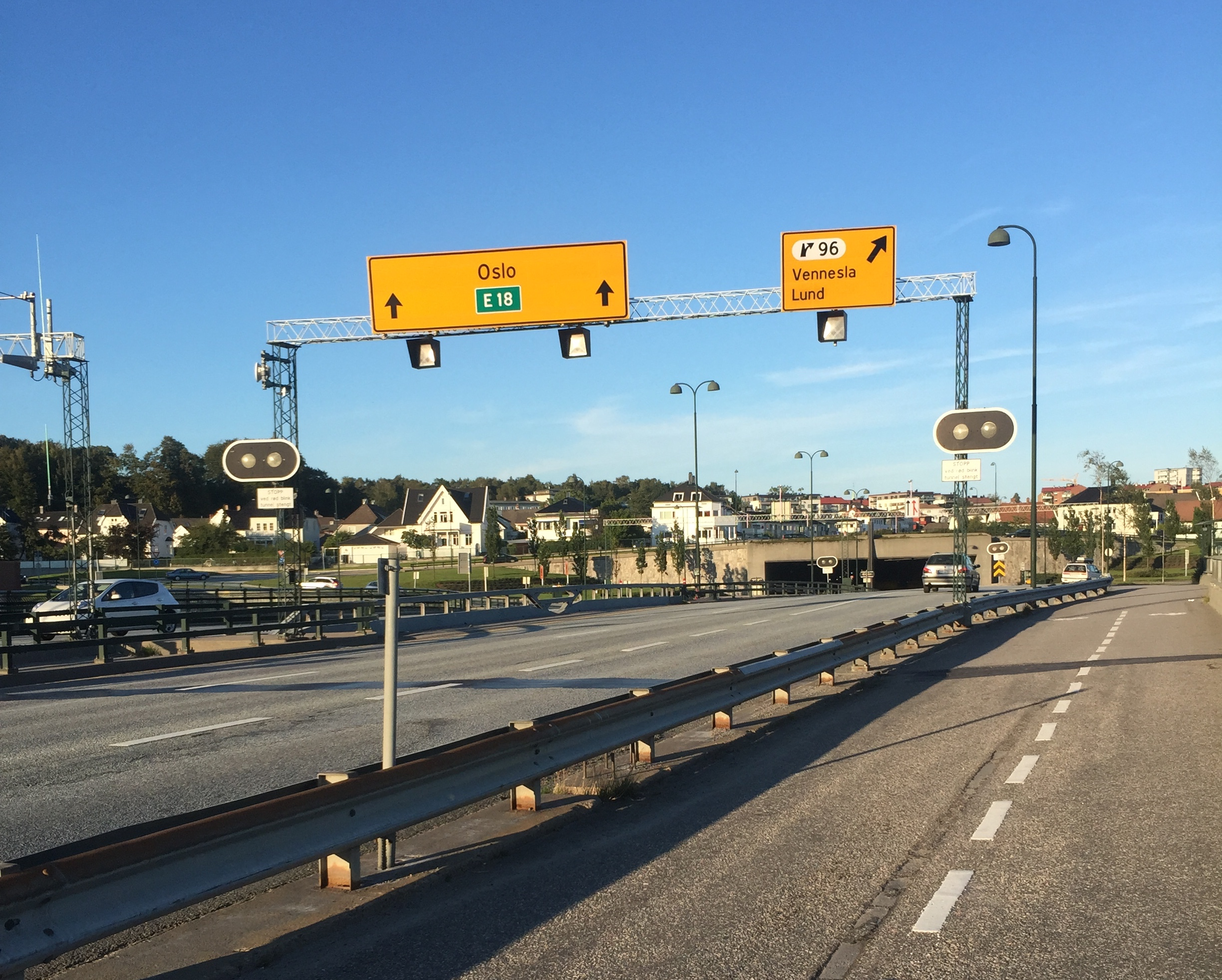
E18 with Oddernestunnellen

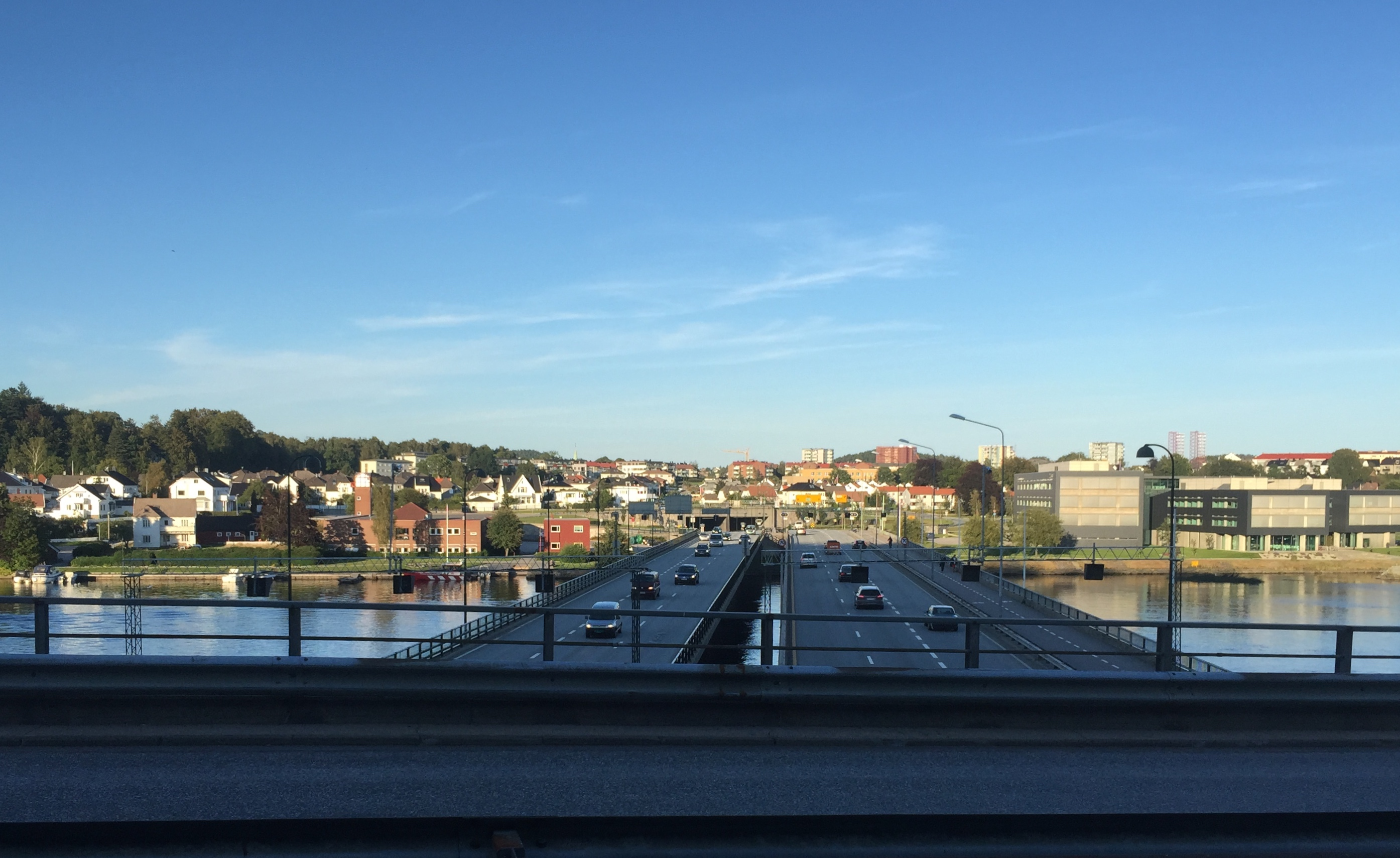
Lund seen from Kvadraturen

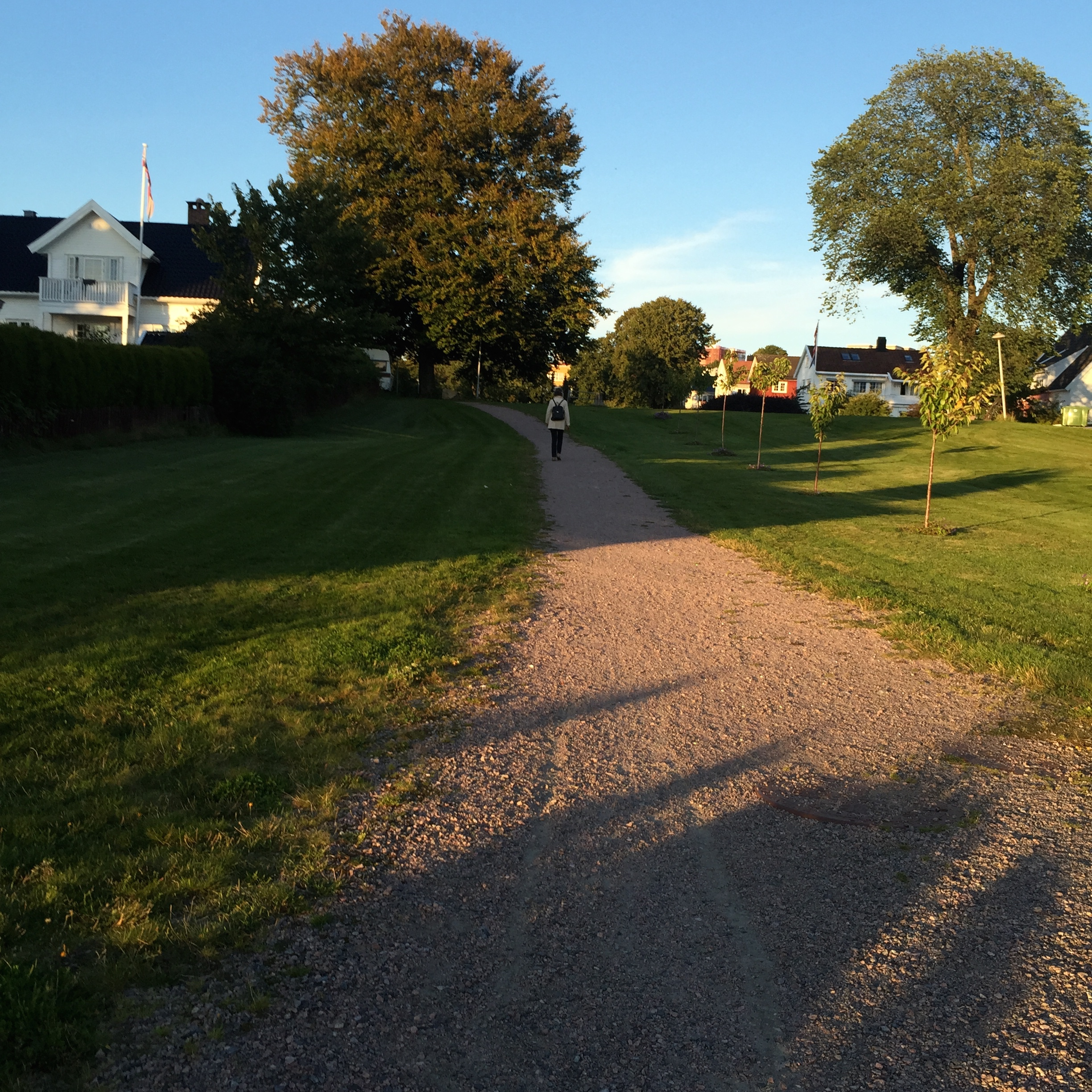
Louvisenlund

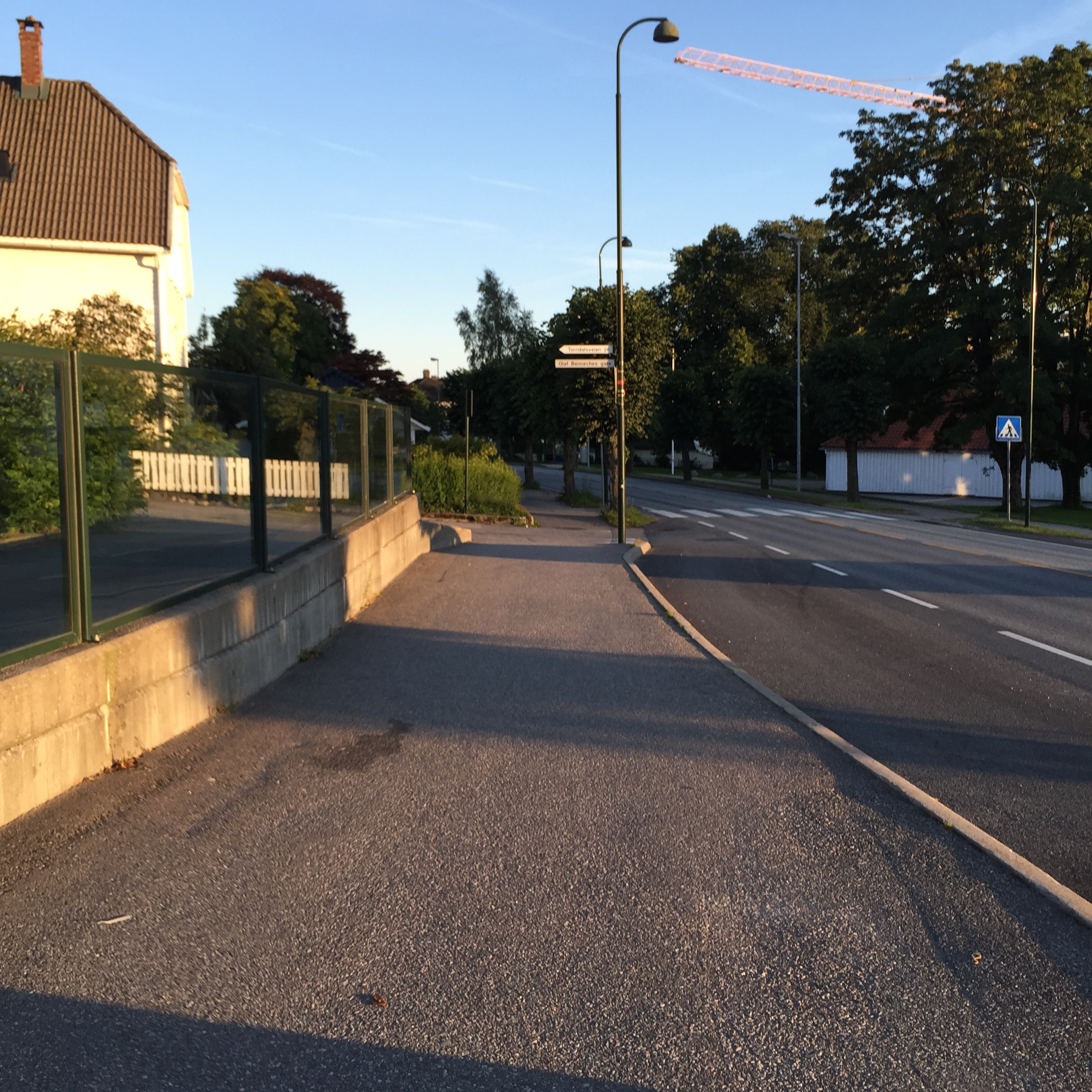
Gimle

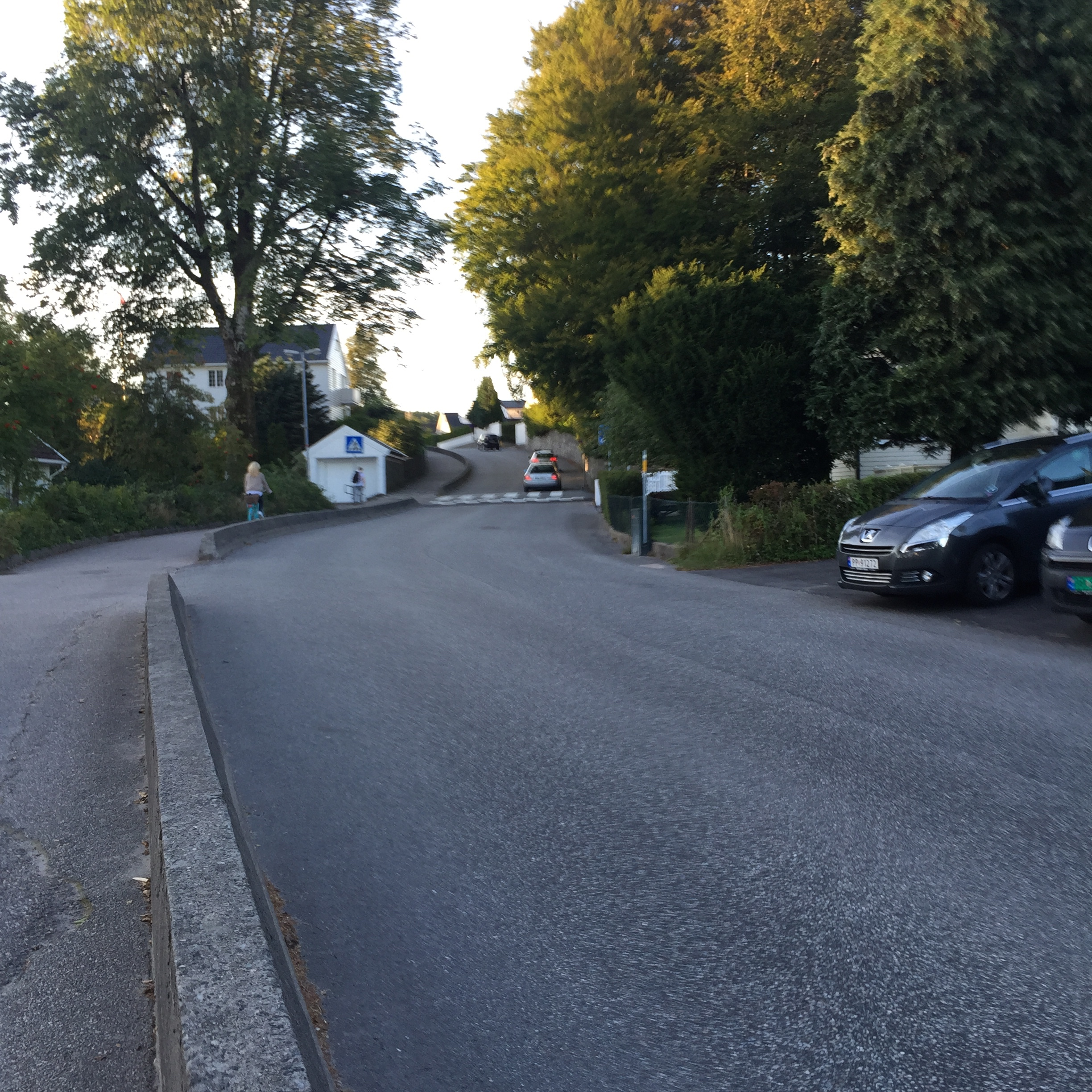
Gimlevang

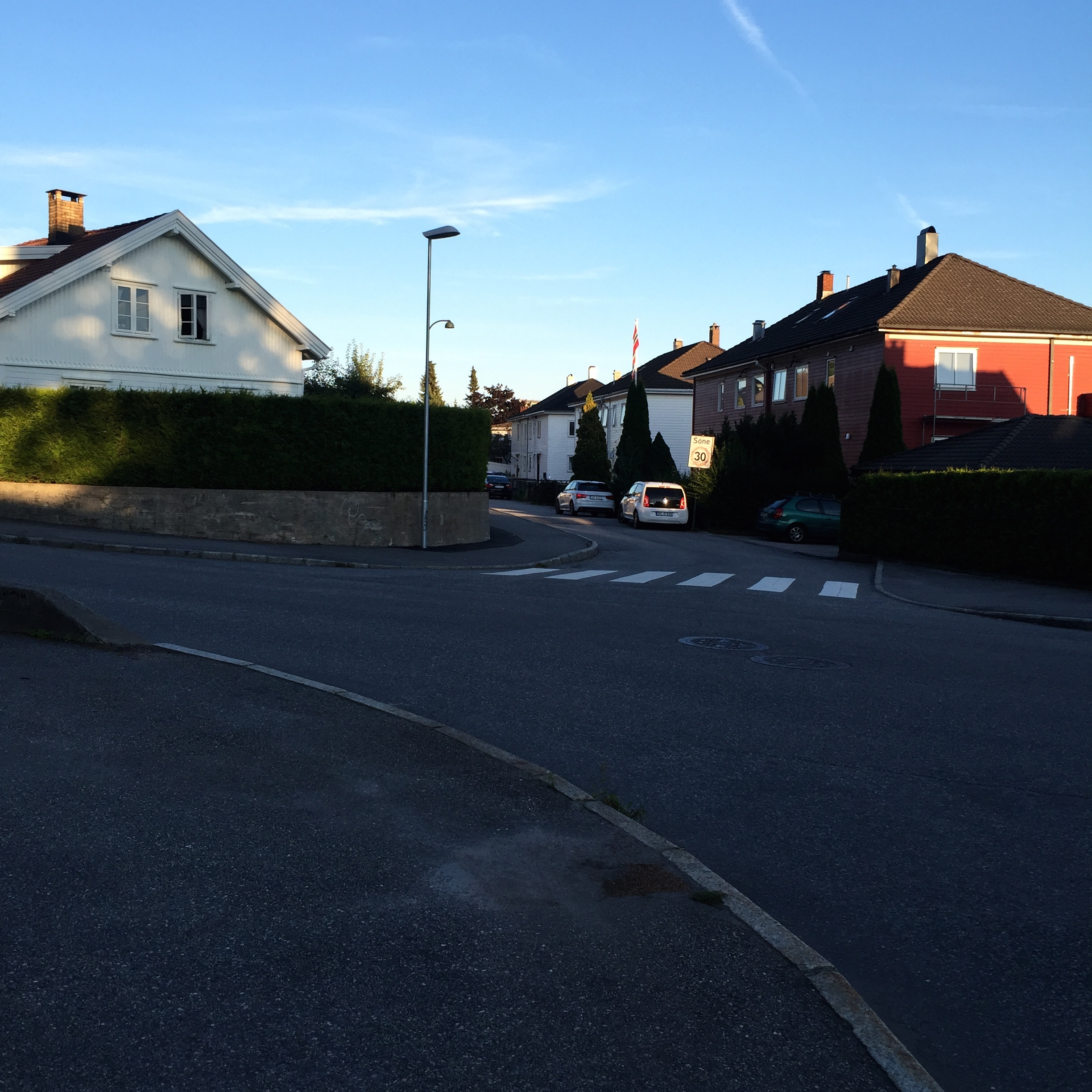
Gimle

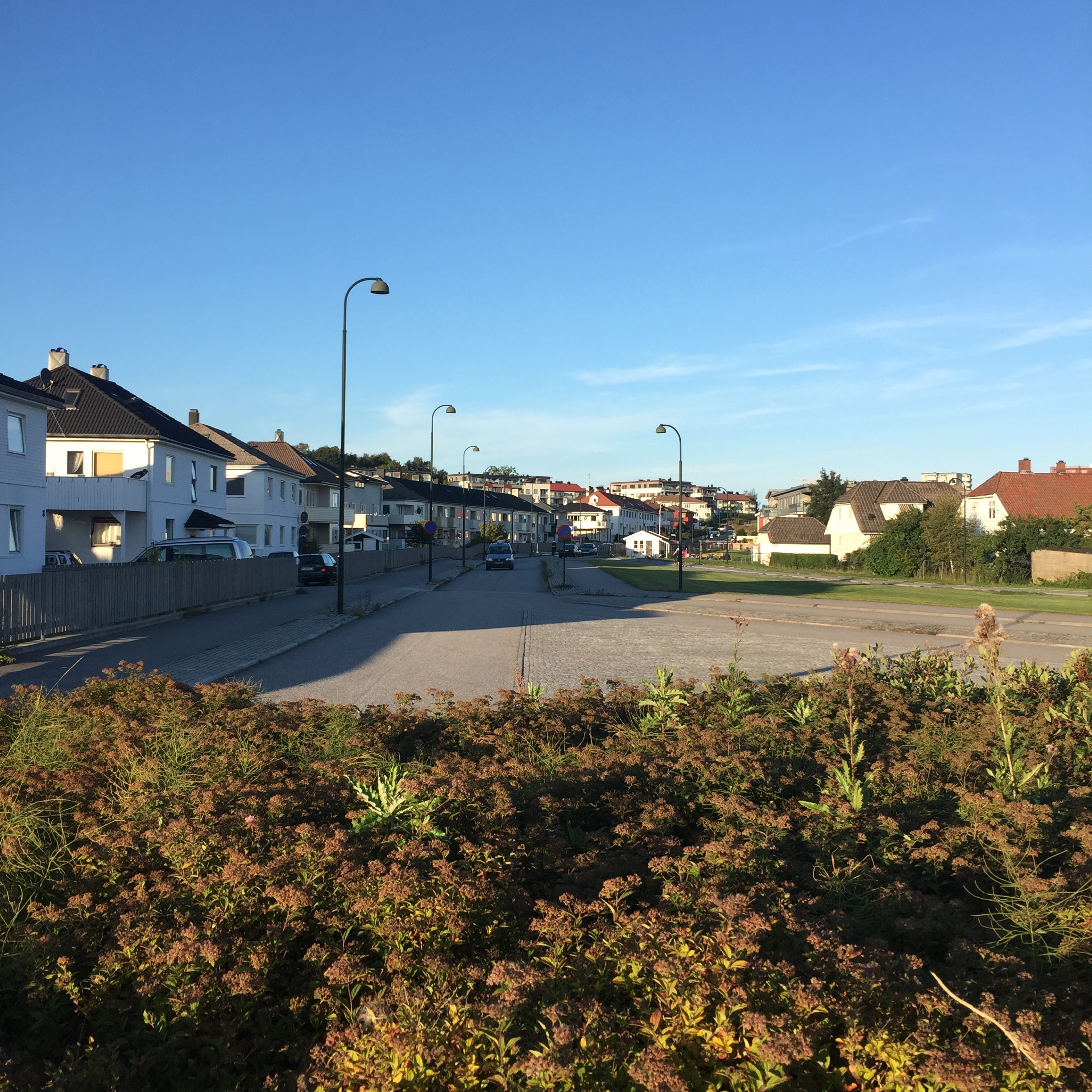
Flaten

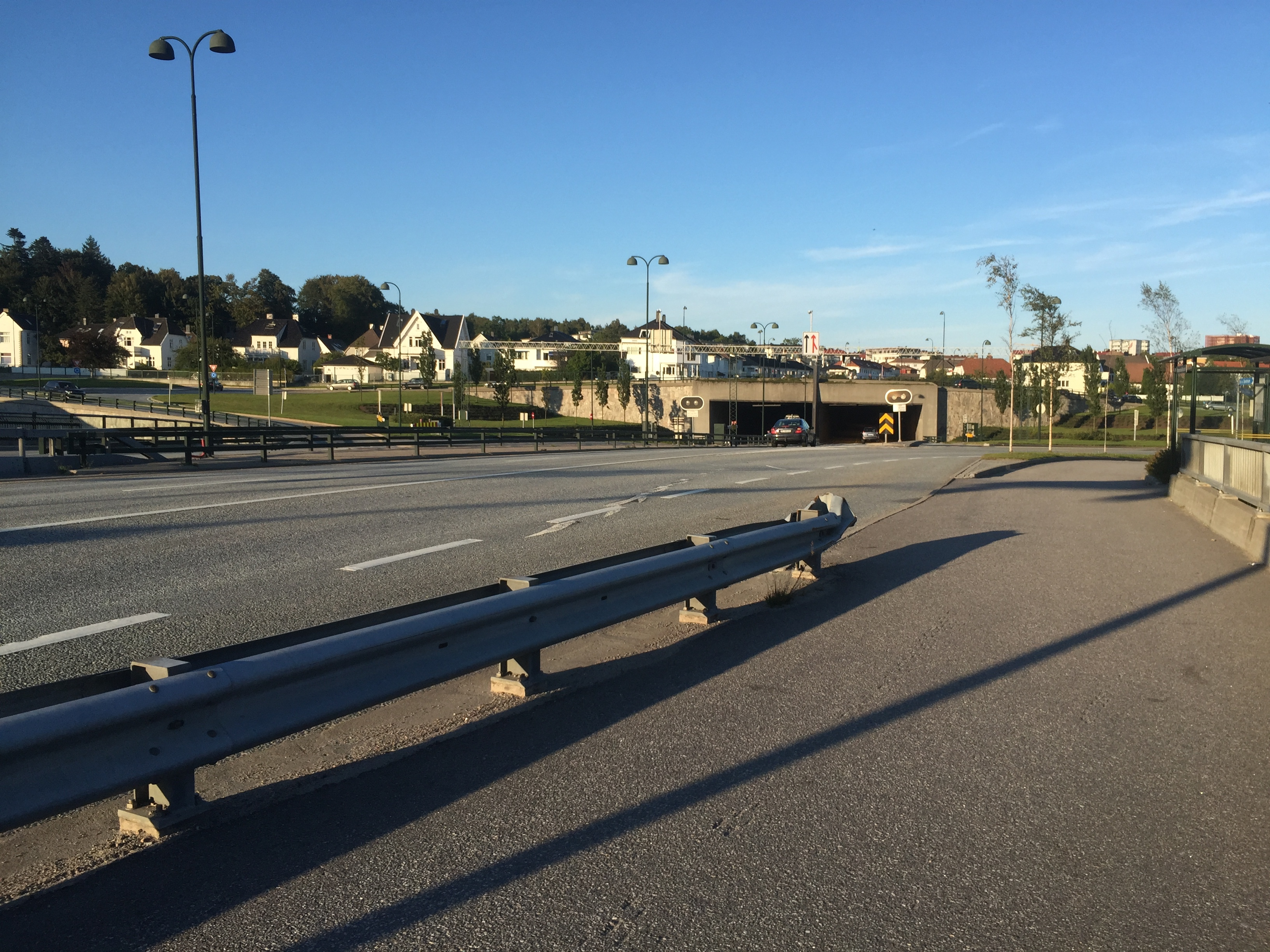
Oddernes tunnel

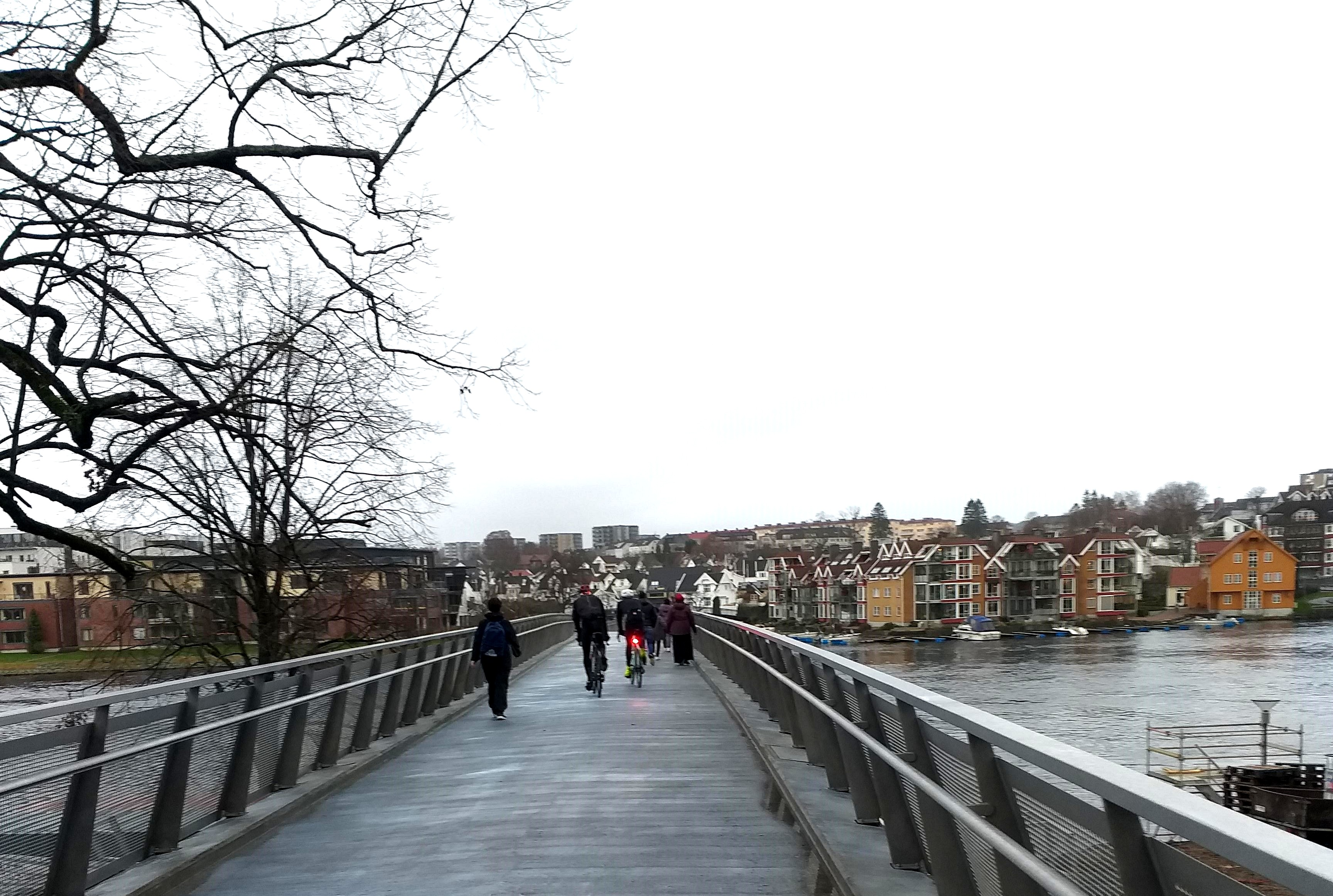
Lund by the Christian Quart Pedestrian Bridge

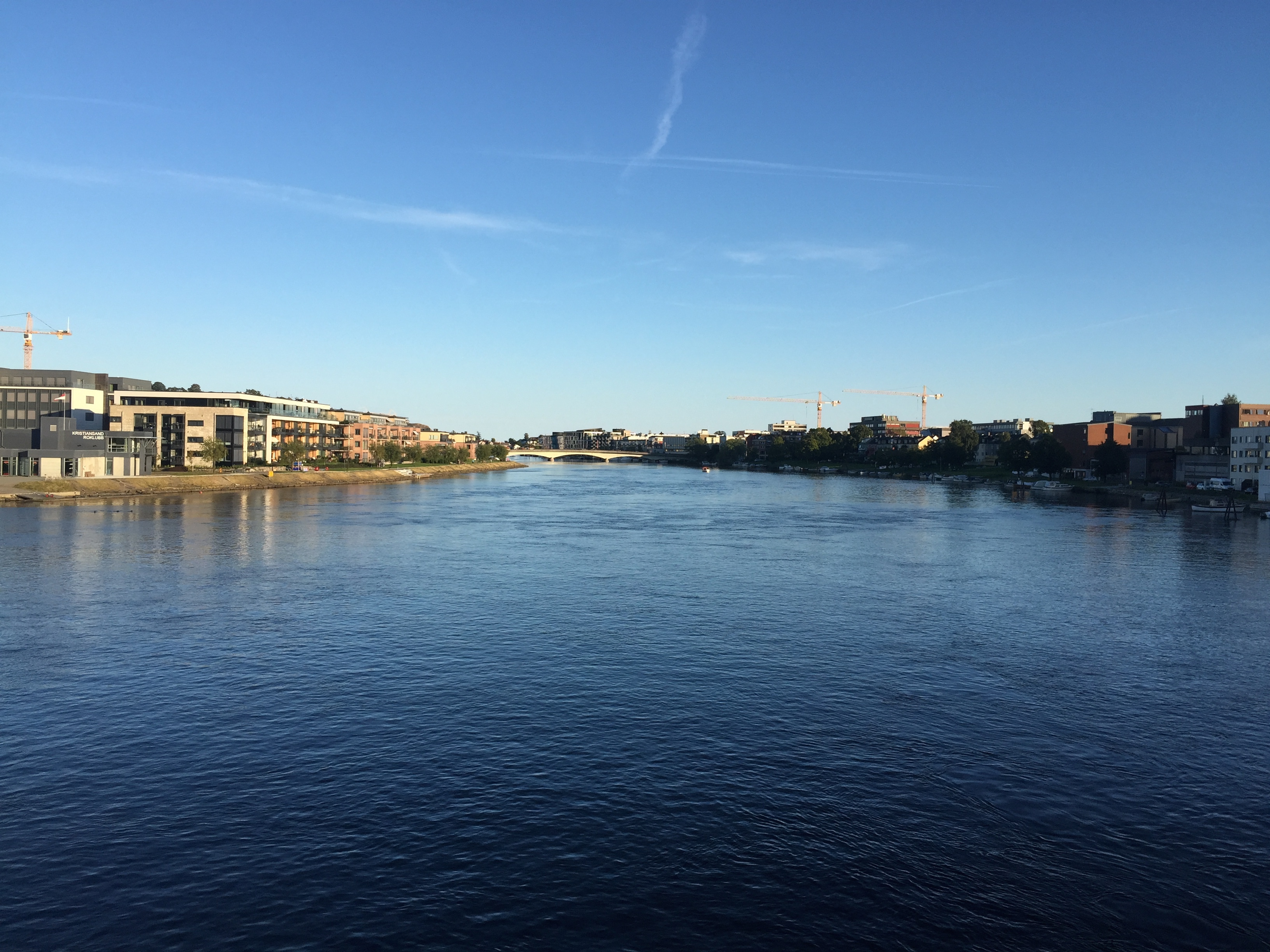
Otra river between Lund and Kvadraturen

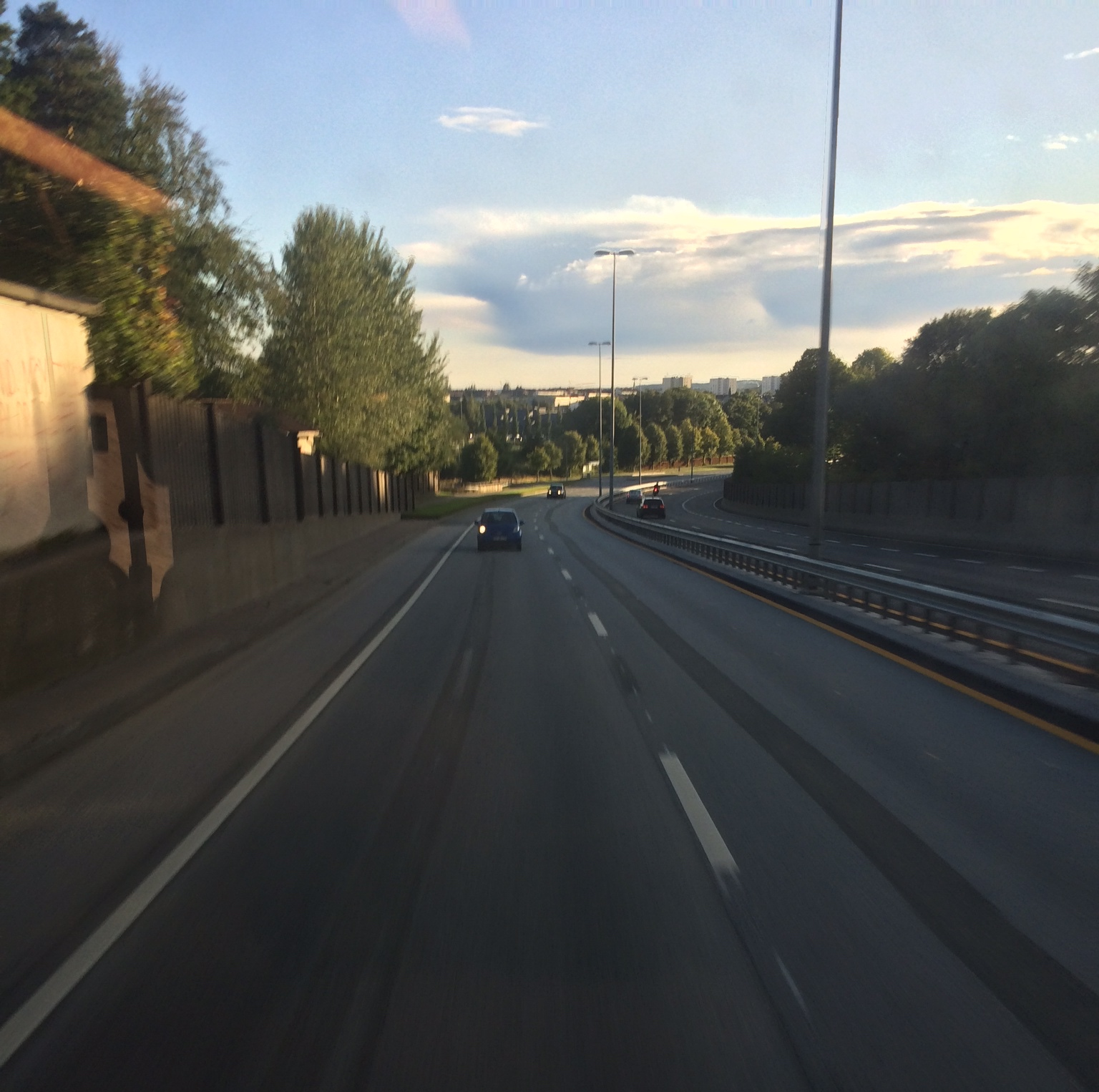
E18 by Vollevannet
