= Torridal =

Valley in Agder, Norway

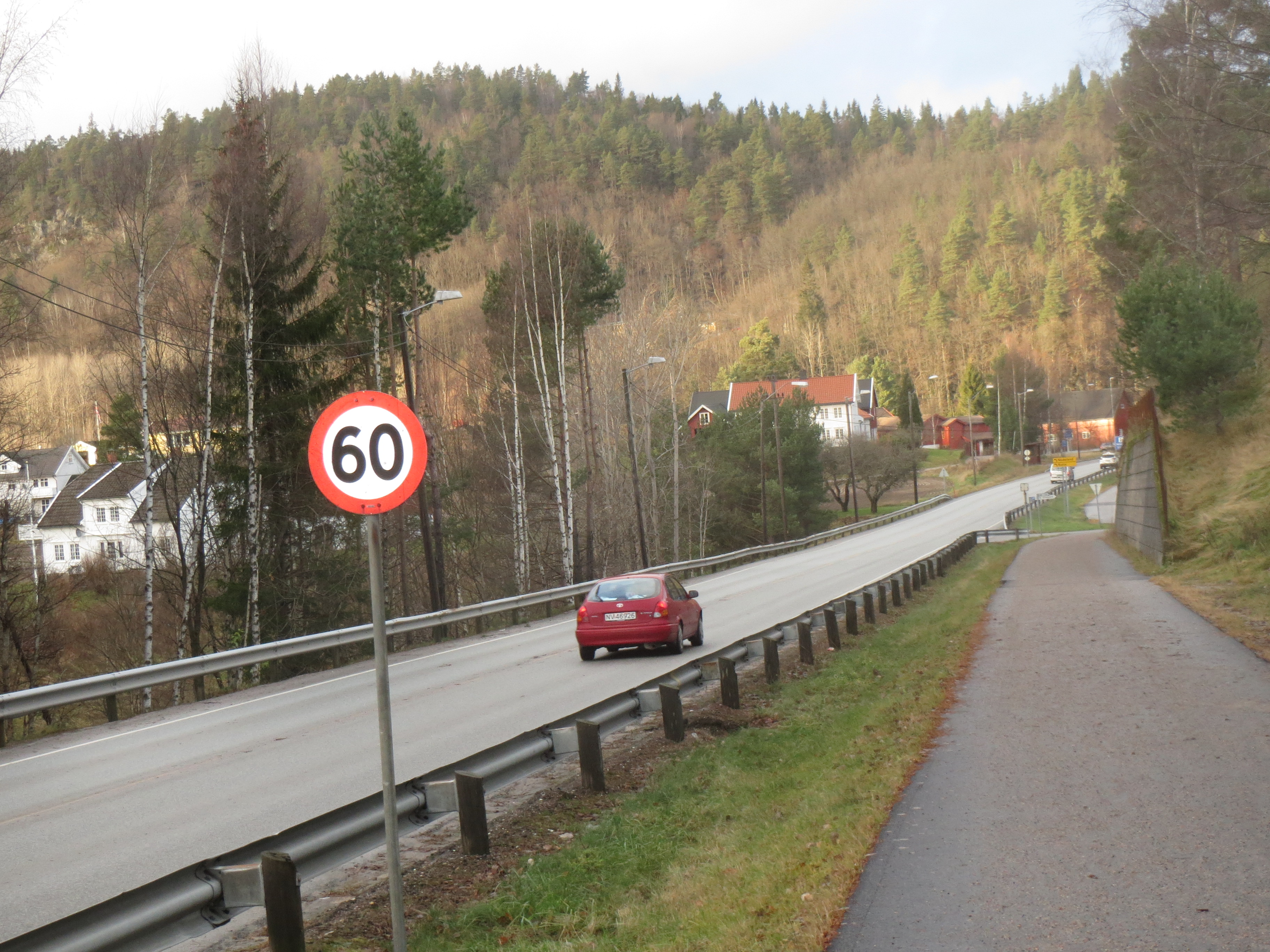
- View of the National Road 9 in the Torridal valley

Geology
- Type: River valley

Geography
- Location: Agder, Norway
- Population centers: Kristiansand
- Coordinates: 58.2046°N 07.9292°E
- Rivers: Otra

Location
- Interactive map of Torridal

Torridal is a V-shaped valley in Agder county, Norway. The valley passes through portions of Kristiansand Municipality and Vennesla Municipality in an area that was historically a part of the former Oddernes Municipality. Today it includes areas north of the city center of Kristiansand on both riverbanks of the river Otra. The local name Torridalselva (meaning Torridal river) is commonly used for the river's lower course from the village of Mosby to the sea.

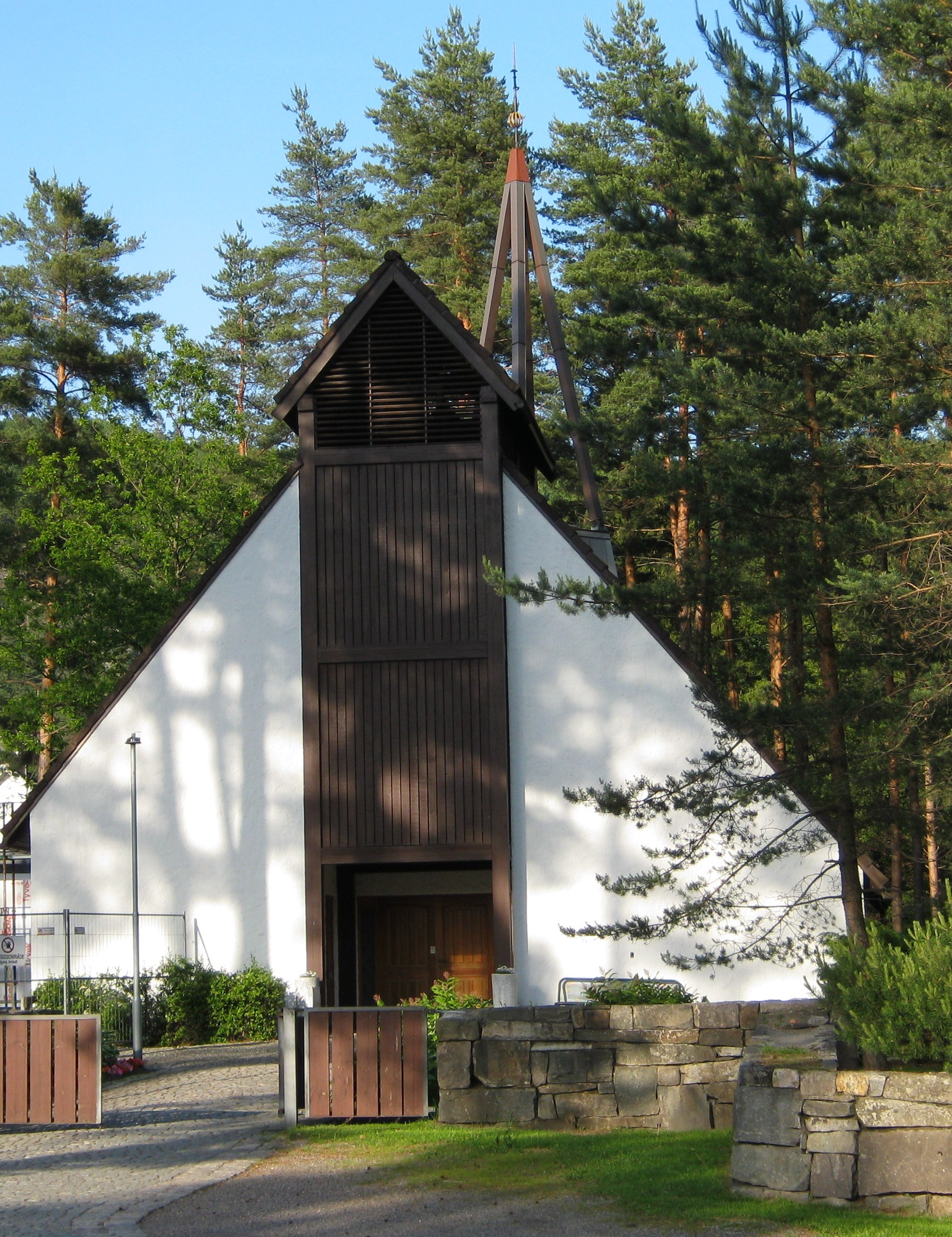
Torridal Church

The valley includes the areas of Sødal, Skråstad, Lian, Hagen, and Glattetre on the east side of the river and Strai, Hommeren, Aukland, Mosby, and Høie on the west side. The districts of Espestøl, Hemmes, Mestad, Aurebekk, Rypestøl, and Kulia are also part of the valley, although they don't lie directly along the river. The Mosby and Strai areas are fairly densely populated, and the Torridal Church lies between those two villages. The Torridal sporting venue has facilities outdoors and indoors in Torridalshallen.

Norwegian National Road 9 ("Setesdalsveien") and the Sørlandet Line railway both run along the west side of the river Otra, through the Torridal valley. Norwegian County Road 1 ("Sødalssida") runs along the east bank of Otra.
