= Tollbodgata =

Street in Kristiansand, Norway

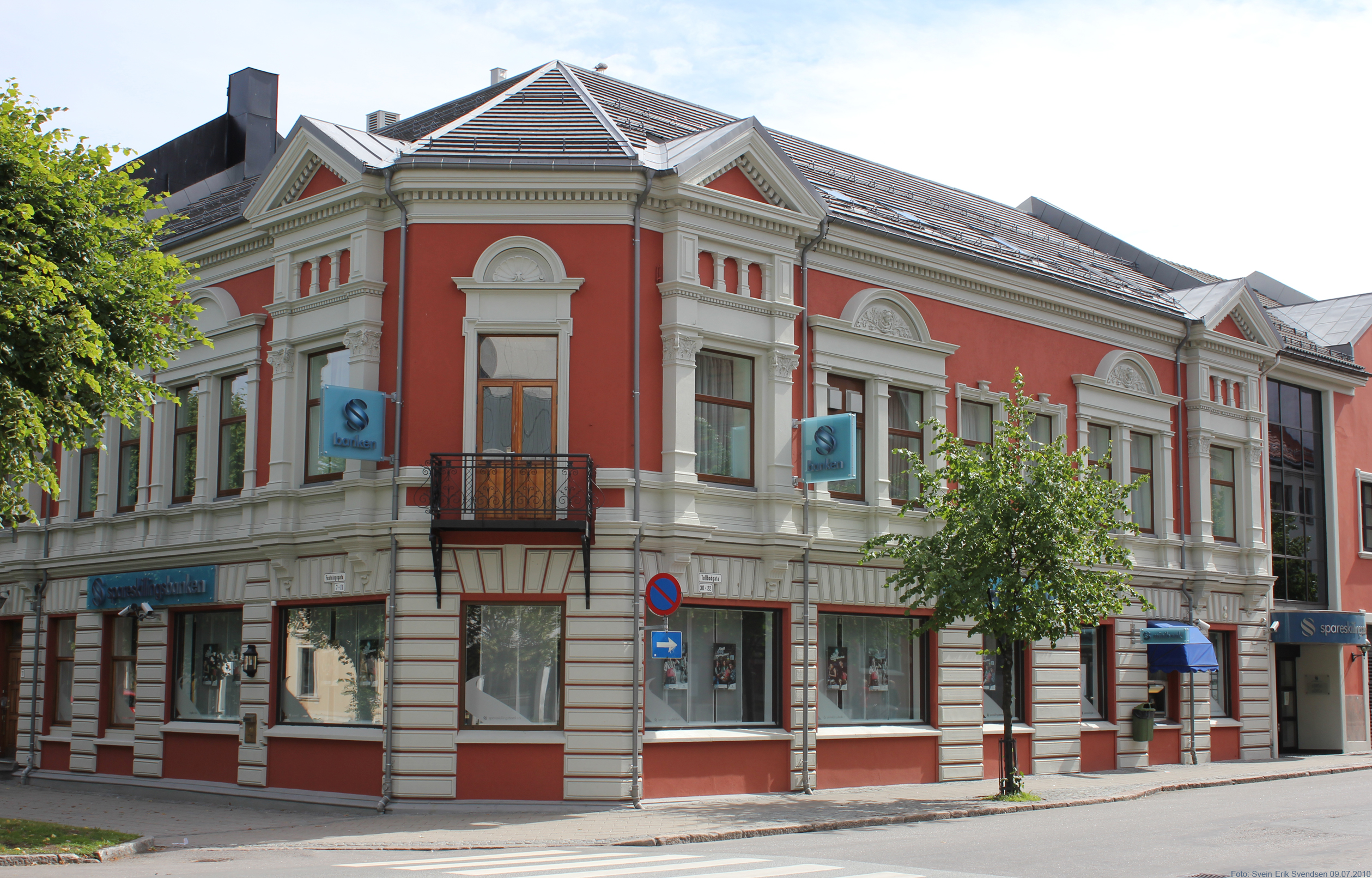
- Tollbodgata with Festningsgata
- Interactive map of Tollbodgata
- Length: 1.0 km (0.62 mi)
- Location: Kvadraturen, Kristiansand
- West end: Kristiansand Harbor with Vestre Strandgate
- East end: Otra River with Elvegata

Tollbodgata is a street in the city of Kristiansand in Kristiansand Municipality in Agder county, Norway. The street is one way westbound with sidewalks on both sides of the road. It consists mostly of apartments, houses, and stores.

== Places of note ==
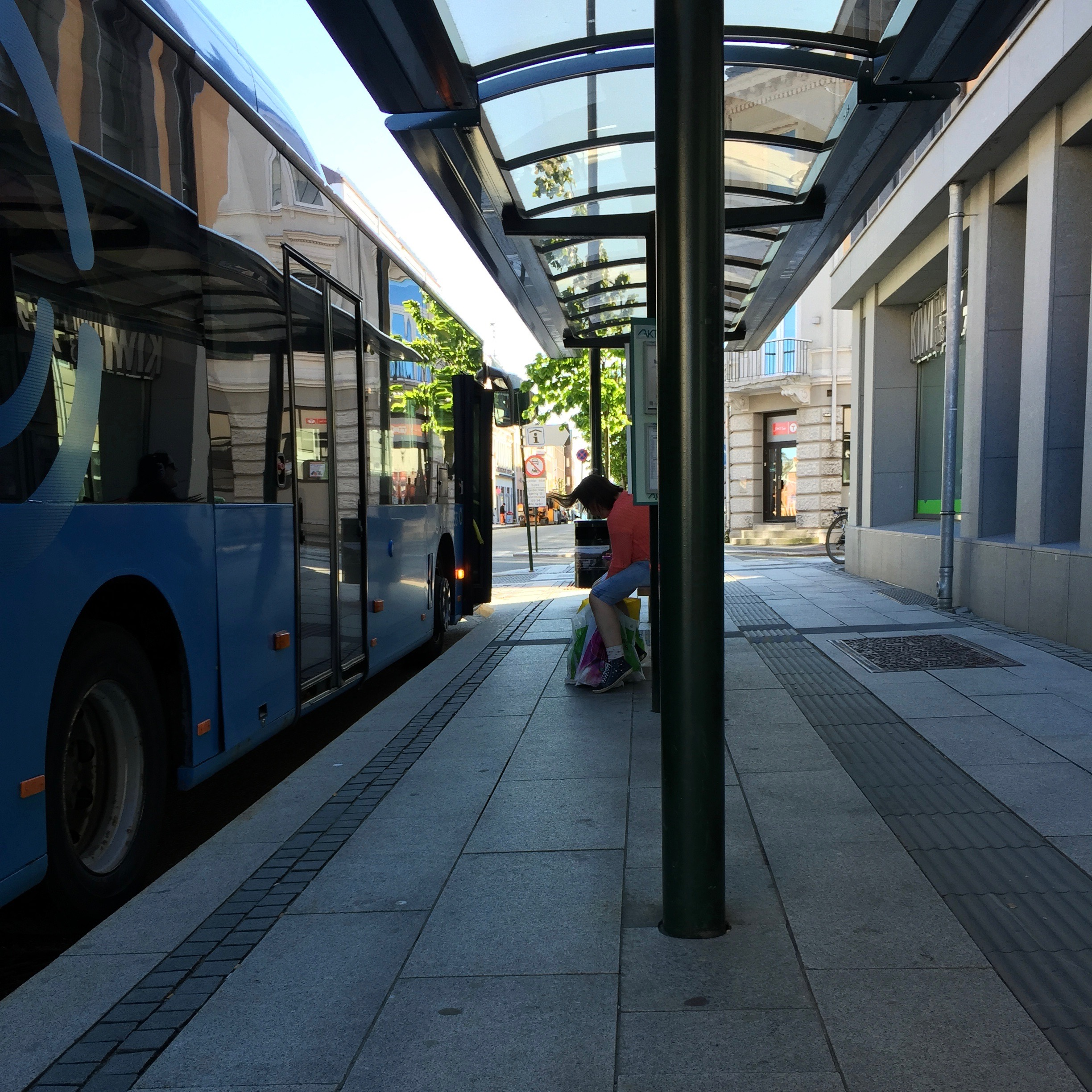
Tollbodgata with Kristiansand City Hall

Kristiansand and Vest-Agder main police station and courthouse, and Kristiansand's largest high school Kvadraturen Skolesenter lies on the street. The Sandens Mall and multiple banks also reside along the street.

The street is an important road for the local city bus lines in Kristiansand.

=== Bus stops ===
- Tollbodgata nedre (northbound and westbound)
- Tollbodgata/Markens gate (westbound)
- Tollbodgata/Kirkegata (westbound terminus)
- Rådhuset pl. N (west and northbound)
- Rådhuset pl. M (northbound)
- Tinghuset (all directions)
- Kvadraturen skolesenter (all directions)

=== Crossing streets (east to west) ===
- Elvegata
- Kronprinsens gate
- Holbergs gate
- Festningsgata
- Kirkegata
- Markens gate
- Vestre Strandgate
