= Dalane (Kristiansand) =

- Neighborhood in Kristiansand
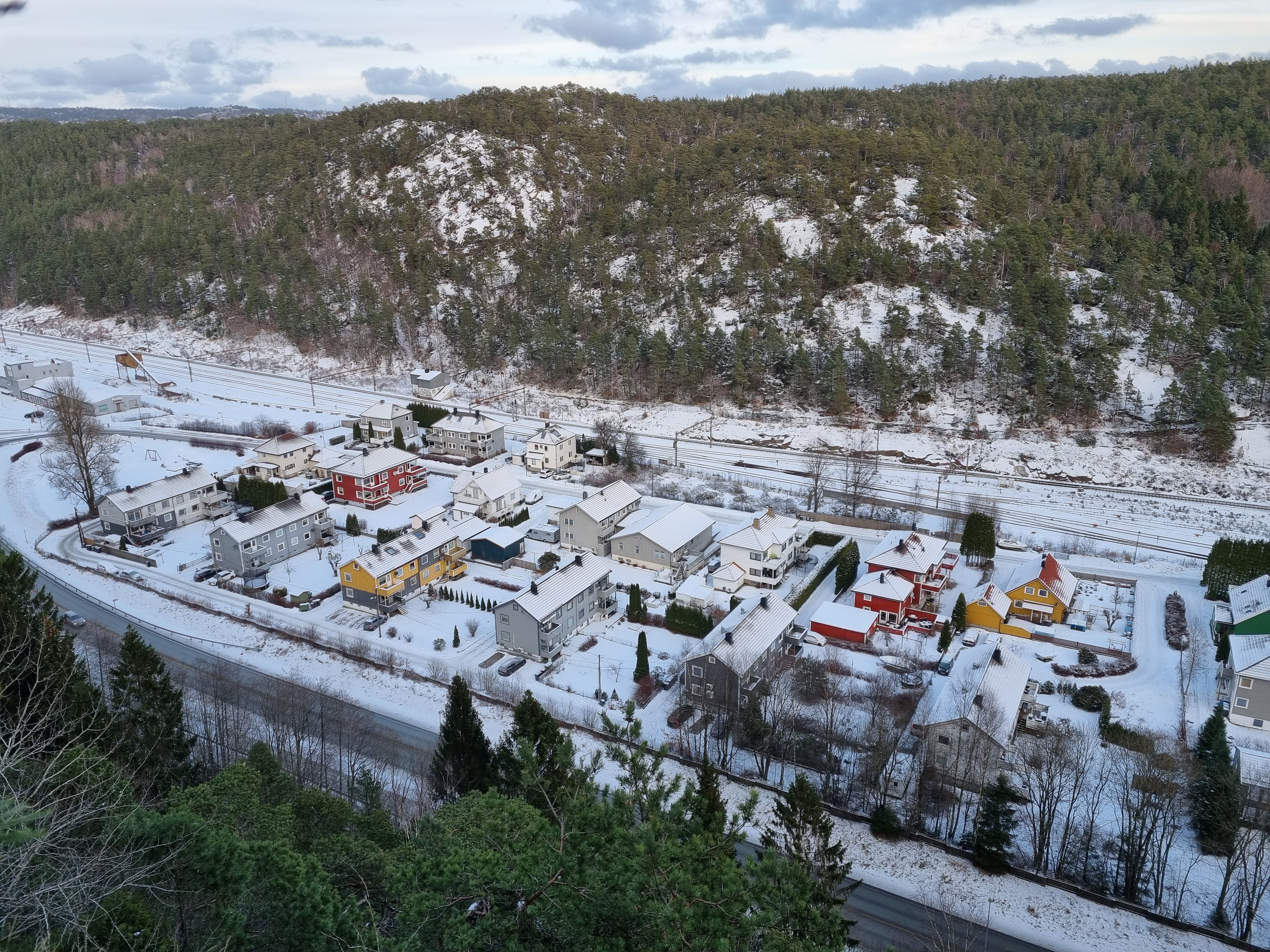
- Interactive map of Dalane
- Coordinates: 58.2358°N 07.8747°E
- Country: Norway
- County: Agder
- Municipality: Kristiansand
- Borough: Grim
- District: Grim
- Elevation: 182 m (597 ft)
- Time zone: UTC+01:00 (CET)
  - Summer (DST): UTC+02:00 (CEST)
- Postal code: 4618
- Area code: 38

Dalane is a neighbourhood in the city of Kristiansand in Agder county, Norway. It is located in the borough of Grim and in the district of Grim. The neighborhood lies along the Norwegian National Road 9, north of Tinnheia and Krossen and south of Strai.

Roads through Dalane
Line	Destination
Norwegian National Road 9	Kristiansand - Evje

Buses through Dalane
Line	Destination
30	Vennesla - Kvadraturen
32	Høietun - Kvadraturen
221	Hovden - Kristiansand
501	Evje - Kristiansand
