= Augland, Torridal =

Village in Kristiansand Municipality, Norway

Augland Aukland
- Village
- Interactive map of Augland
- Coordinates: 58.20587°N 7.92278°E
- Country: Norway
- Region: Southern Norway
- County: Agder
- Municipality: Kristiansand Municipality
- Borough: Grim
- Elevation: 22 m (72 ft)
- Time zone: UTC+01:00 (CET)
  - Summer (DST): UTC+02:00 (CEST)
- Post Code: 4618 Kristiansand S

Augland is a village in the Torridal valley in Kristiansand Municipality in Agder county, Norway. The village is located in the borough of Grim on the western bank of the river Otra between the villages of Strai and Mosby. In 1978, Torridal Church was built in Augland. The Norwegian National Road 9 runs north–south through the village.
