= Furre =

Furre is a surname. Notable people with the surname include:

- Berge Furre (1937–2016), Norwegian historian, theologian, and politician
- Else Kollerud Furre (1922–2019), Norwegian politician
- Harald Furre (born 1964), Norwegian economist and politician
