= Dalane (disambiguation) =

Dalane may refer to:

== Places ==
- Dalane, a traditional district in the southwestern part of Norway
- Dalane (Kristiansand), a neighbourhood in the city of Kristiansand in Vest-Agder, Norway

== Other ==
- Dalane prosti, a Church of Norway deanery serving an area in southwestern, Norway
- Dalane District Court, a district court located in Egersund, Norway
- Dalane Tidende, a local newspaper published in Egersund, Norway
