= Markens gate =

Street in Kristiansand, Norway

- Markens street
- Interactive map of Markens gate
- Native name: Markens gate (Norwegian)
- Length: 1.0 km (0.62 mi)
- Location: Kvadraturen, Kristiansand
- South end: Otterdalsparken with Tresse
- North end: Slottet Mall with Tordenskjolds gate

Other
- Known for: Main pedestrian street in Kristiansand

Markens gate (English: Markens street) is the main pedestrian street in the city of Kristiansand in Kristiansand Municipality, Agder county, Norway. It is located in the west of the borough Kvadraturen and the length of the entire street is 1 kilometre (0.62 mi), while the pedestrian part is 550 metres (1,800 ft) and another 160 metres (520 ft) with Otterdalsparken. The streets goes from Slottet Mall in the north and is a pedestrian street all the way down to Dronningens gate (Dronningens street), it's only crossed by traffic from Tordenskjolds gate, Kristian IVs gate, and Henrik Wergelands gate before Dronningens gate. The pedestrian parts stretches over 7 quarters. Compared to other Norwegian cities, Markens street is one of the most walked streets in the country.

The street is an important road for the local city bus lines in Kristiansand.

Bus stops:

- H. Wergelandsgate/Markens gate
- H. Wergelandsgate pl. C, D, E, F, G, H, I
- Tollbodgata/Markens gate
- Tollbodgata nedre

Crossing streets (south to north):

- Strandpronemaden
- Østre Strandgate
- Kongens gate
- Dronningens gate
- Tollbodgata
- Rådhusgata
- Gyldenløves gate
- Skippergata
- Henrik Wergelands gate
- Kristian IVs gate
- Tordenskjolds gate

== Places ==
The town square is located in the middle of Markens gate with the Kristiansand Cathedral. The town square is filled with restaurants and cafes at the sidelines. It starts from Markens gate in the west and Wergelandsparken in the east. Wergelandsparken was created by Oscar Wergeland (Henrik Wergeland's brother) in 1859 and finished in 1860. In 1866, a water fountain was placed in the middle of the park, but this was later moved in 1908 for a statue of Henrik Wergeland in honor of his 100th birthday even though Henrik died in 1845. The statue was made by Gustav Vigeland and still stands there today.

Markens gate ends at the Otterdalsparken, a park often referred to as Nupenparken since it was design by Norwegian contemporary artist Kjell Nupen whom was born and died in Kristiansand.

Sandens Mall is a shopping mall located with Tollbodgata in Markens gate. It is the largest mall on Kvadraturen. Lillemarkens is a small inside street with stores, it goes from Markens gate to Vestre Strandgate. Slottet Mall is the oldest mall on Kvadraturen, it is located with an exit of the highway to the parking lot.
