= Kristiansand City Hall =

Building in Kristiansand, Norway

- Kristiansand rådhus
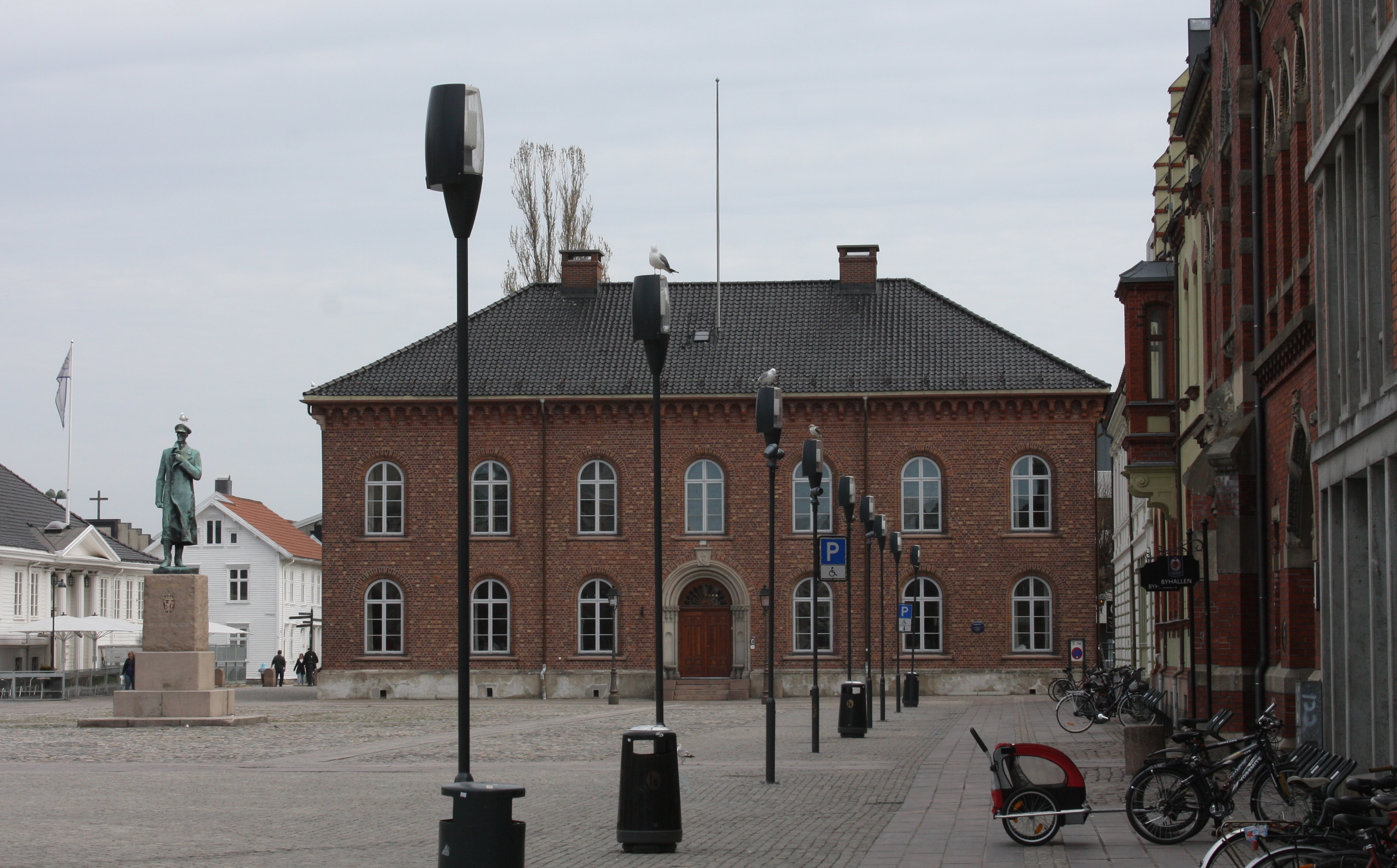
- The City Hall as seen from the square
- Interactive map of the Kristiansand City Hall area

General information
- Location: Kvadraturen, Kristiansand, Norway
- Coordinates: 58°8′48″N 7°59′49″E
- Current tenants: Kristiansand Municipal Council
- Construction started: 1863
- Completed: 1864; Reconstructed 1982
- Owner: Kristiansand Municipality

Design and construction
- Architects: Carl Emil Kaurin; Alf Erikstad

References
- Olav Breen: Kristiansand - en mangfoldig by

Kristiansand City Hall is located on the upper square in the centre of the town of Kristiansand which is located in Kristiansand Municipality in Agder, Norway. The city hall houses the municipal council hall and meeting rooms. The municipal administration, including the mayor's office is located in the other buildings with front facing the square. These offices also have access from the neighboring street Tollbodgata.

== History ==
In the early 19th century the city had few public buildings. In the 1830s began the need for municipal buildings to be intrusive. It was planned a town hall that would contain courthouse, tax collector, police commissioner, magistrate - and jail to replace the rickety, old jail in town. The municipal executive council turned to the Norway's most renowned architects. High construction costs meant that plans were put aside. In the late 1850s offered the government to pay large contributions to municipalities who raised new jail constructions. The city did not let the chance go by.

The magistracy proposed in 1860 to build the city hall and the jail at the square (marketplace). Architect Carl Emil Kaurin in Christiania constructed the city hall. The city hall with jail was built by workers from the capital in 1863-1864.

The city hall was inaugurated on 15 September 1864. The Presidency hall was placed in the city hall in 1951. In the early 1980s, the old jail was demolished in connection with an expansion of the neighboring street Festningsgata, and the city hall was reconstructed and redecorated by city architect Alf Erikstad.
