= Skålevik =

Village in Kristiansand Municipality, Norway

- Village
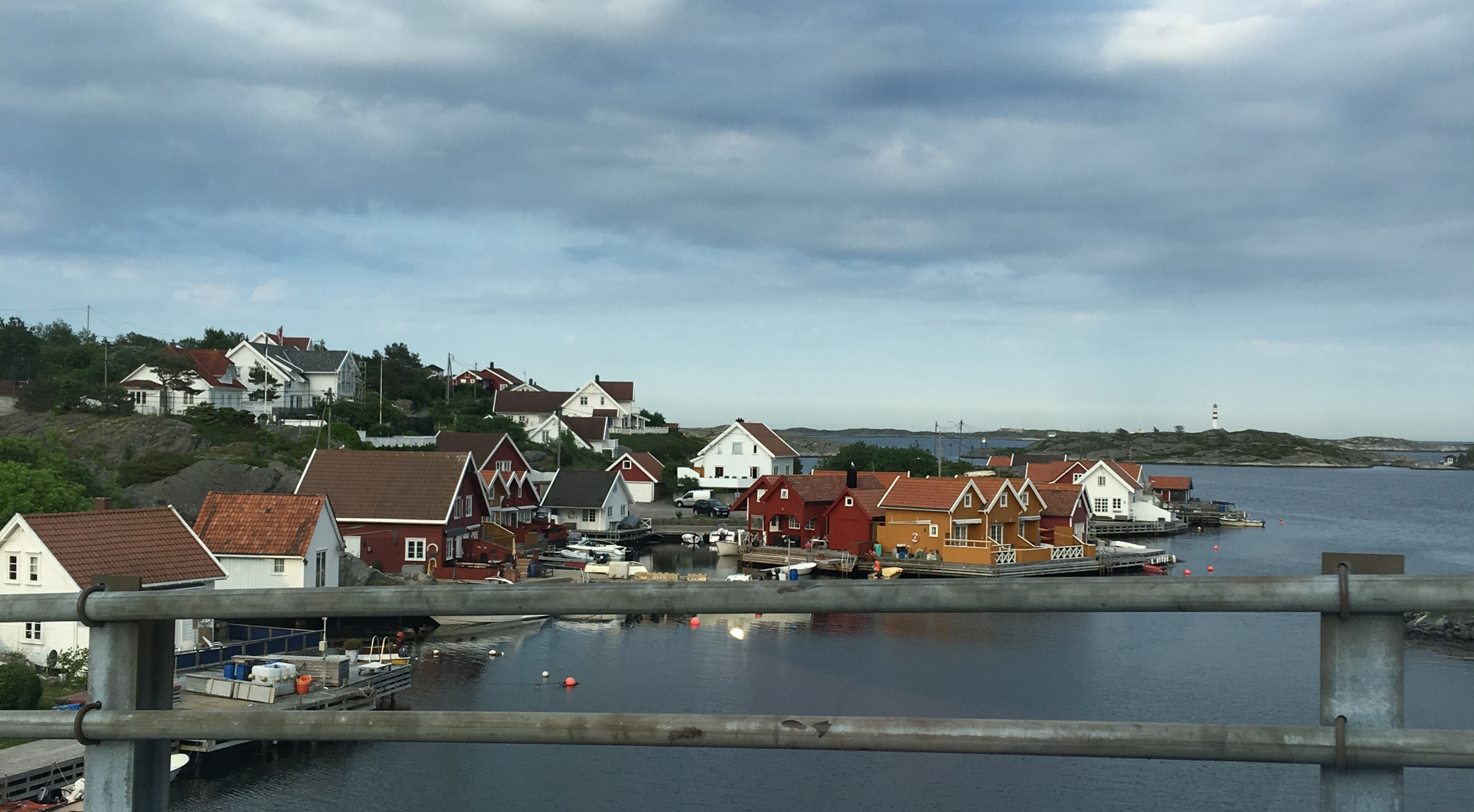
- View of the village
- Interactive map of Skålevik
- Coordinates: 58.0796°N 08.0160°E
- Country: Norway
- Region: Southern Norway
- County: Agder
- Municipality: Kristiansand Municipality
- Borough: Vågsbygd

Area
  - Total: 2.16 km^{2} (0.83 sq mi)
- Elevation: 14 m (46 ft)

Population (2025)
  - Total: 3,735
  - Density: 1,729/km^{2} (4,480/sq mi)
- Time zone: UTC+01:00 (CET)
  - Summer (DST): UTC+02:00 (CEST)
- Post Code: 4625 Flekkerøy

Skålevik is an urban village area on the northern part of the island of Flekkerøya in Kristiansand Municipality in Agder county, Norway. The village is located within the borough of Vågsbygd. The 2.16-square-kilometre (530-acre) village has a population (2025) of 3,735 and a population density of 1,729 inhabitants per square kilometre (4,480/sq mi).

== Climate ==
Climate data for Oksøy Lighthouse 1991-2020 (9 m)
Month	Jan	Feb	Mar	Apr	May	Jun	Jul	Aug	Sep	Oct	Nov	Dec	Year
Mean daily maximum °C (°F)	4 (39)	3.5 (38.3)	5.2 (41.4)	8.6 (47.5)	13.1 (55.6)	16.7 (62.1)	18.9 (66.0)	19.1 (66.4)	15.8 (60.4)	11.4 (52.5)	7.6 (45.7)	5 (41)	10.7 (51.3)
Daily mean °C (°F)	2.2 (36.0)	1.5 (34.7)	3 (37)	5.9 (42.6)	10.1 (50.2)	13.6 (56.5)	16 (61)	16.2 (61.2)	13.4 (56.1)	9.4 (48.9)	5.9 (42.6)	3.3 (37.9)	8.4 (47.1)
Mean daily minimum °C (°F)	0.2 (32.4)	−0.3 (31.5)	0.9 (33.6)	3.8 (38.8)	7.8 (46.0)	11.5 (52.7)	13.9 (57.0)	14.1 (57.4)	11.5 (52.7)	7.5 (45.5)	4 (39)	1.3 (34.3)	6.4 (43.4)
Average precipitation mm (inches)	123 (4.8)	88 (3.5)	82 (3.2)	61 (2.4)	72 (2.8)	72 (2.8)	77 (3.0)	107 (4.2)	121 (4.8)	160 (6.3)	140 (5.5)	135 (5.3)	1,238 (48.6)
Source 1: yr.no (precipitation)
Source 2: NOAA-WMO averages 91-2020 Norway
