= Mosby, Norway =

District Mosby
- Village and District
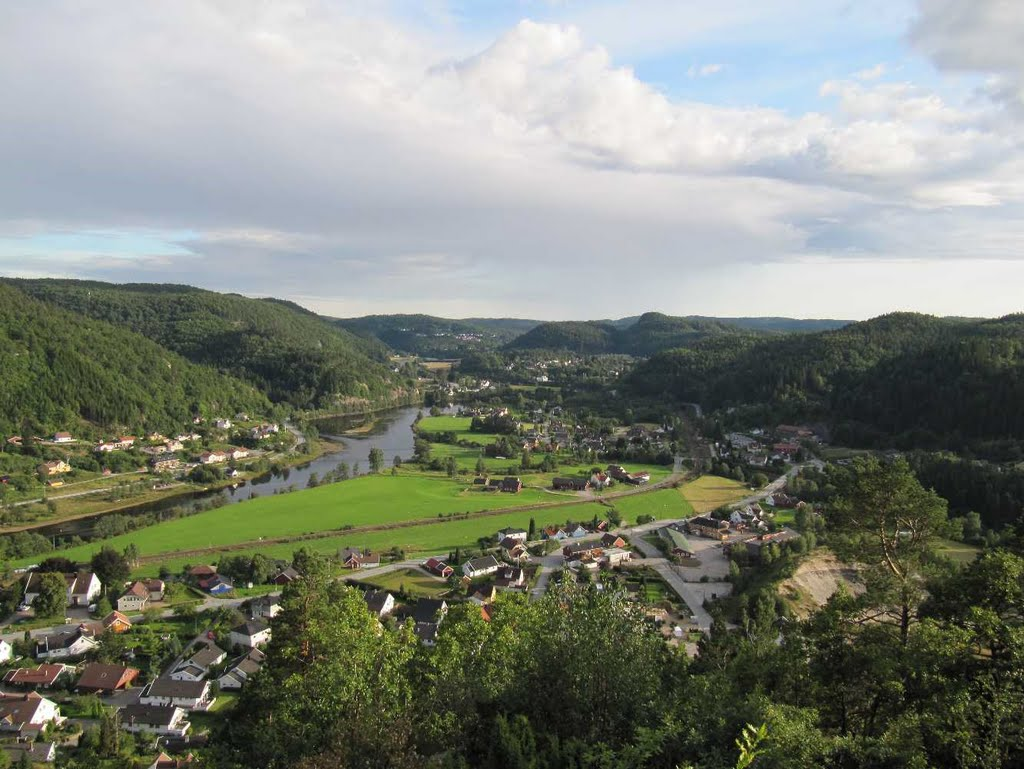
- View of the village of Mosby

- Coat of arms

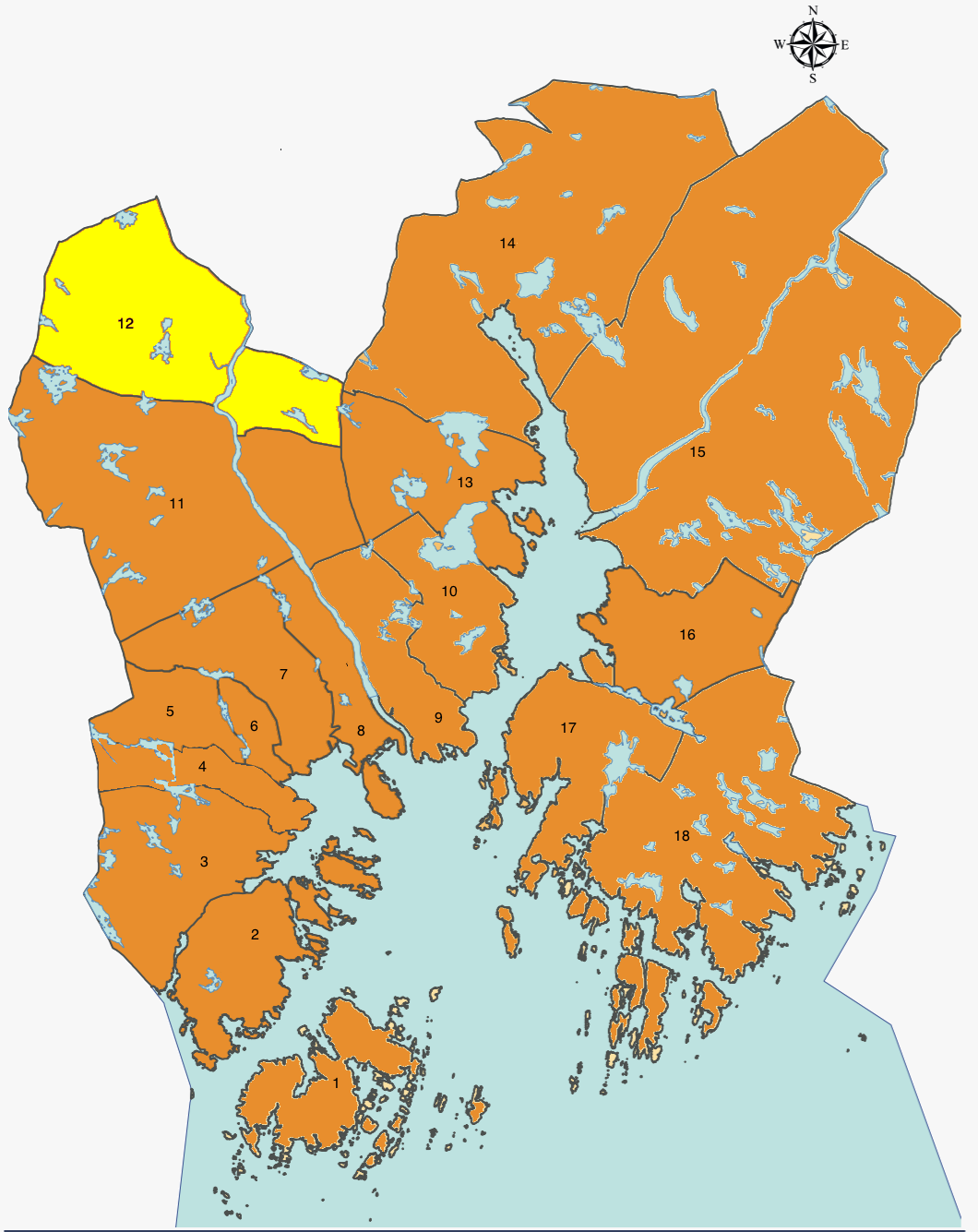
- Map of Kristiansand with Mosby district highlighted in yellow
- Interactive map of District Mosby
- Coordinates: 58.2173°N 07.9233°E
- Country: Norway
- Region: Southern Norway
- County: Agder
- Municipality: Kristiansand
- Borough: Grim
- Elevation: 10 m (33 ft)

Population (2014)
  - Total: 3,660
- Time zone: UTC+01:00 (CET)
  - Summer (DST): UTC+02:00 (CEST)
- ISO 3166 code: NO-030112
- Website: kristiansand.kommune.no

Mosby is a village and district in the Torridal valley in Kristiansand Municipality in Agder county, Norway. The village lies along the river Otra, between the villages of Augland and Strai (to the south) and the border with Vennesla Municipality to the north.

Mosby's population in 1999 was 1,950, but since 2001 it has been considered to be a part of the urban area of Vennesla so separate village statistics are not tracked.

== Neighbourhoods ==
- Haus
- Heisel
- Høietun
- Lindekleiv
- Mosby
- Øvre Mosby

== Transportation ==
Bus transportation from/through Mosby
Line	Destination
30	Vennesla - Kristiansand
32	Høietun - Kvadraturen
32	Høietun - Kvadraturen
170	Evje - Kristiansand
N30	Vennesla - Kristiansand

== Notable people ==
- Eva Margot (1944-2019), a painter
