= Eva Margot =

Norwegian painter (1944–2019)

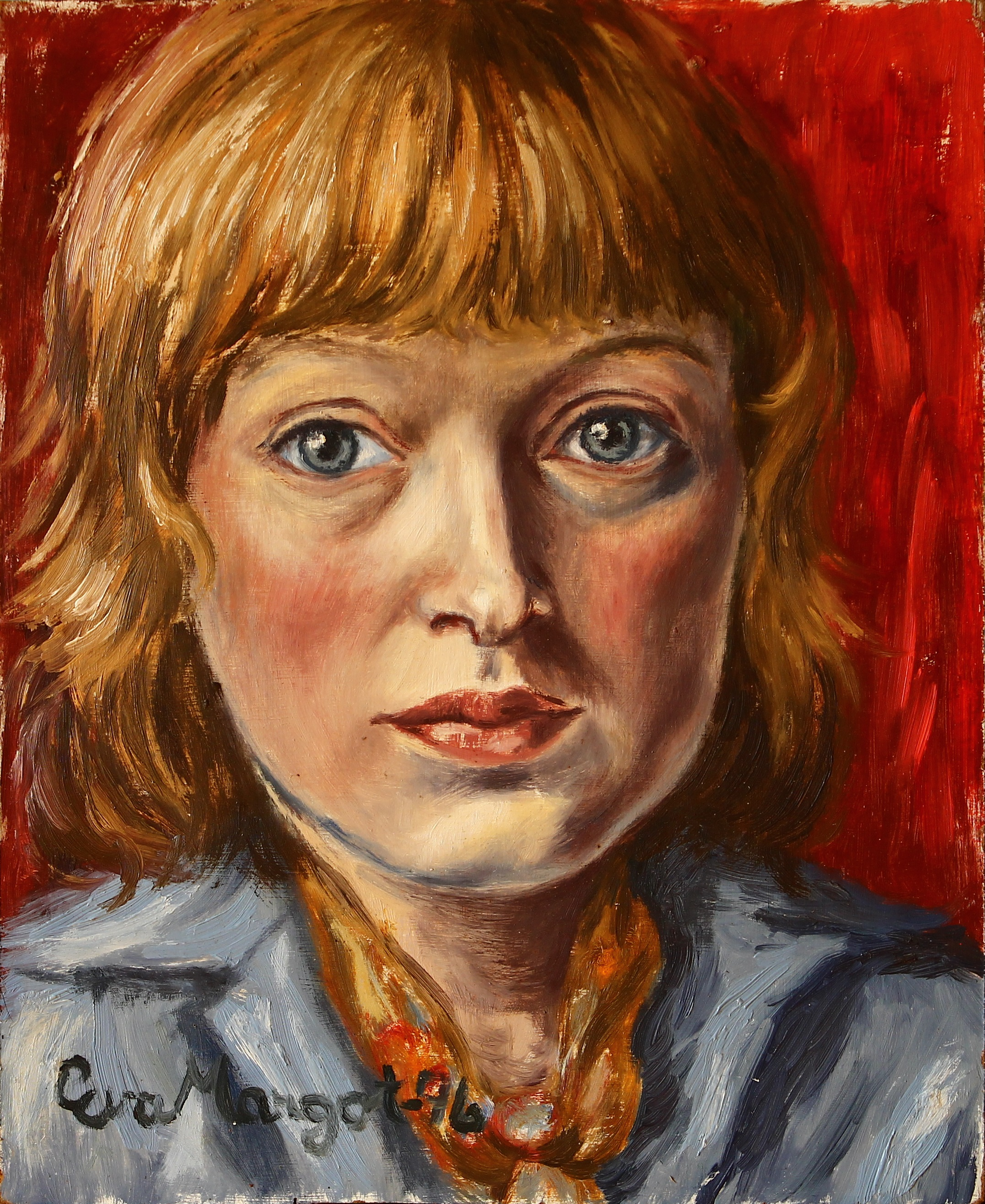
- Self portrait of Eva Margot at the age of 32
- Born: Eva Johansen; 1944; Mosby, Norway
- Died: 2019 (aged 74–75); Mosby
- Website: www.evamargot.com

Eva Margot born Johansen (1944 – 2019) was a Norwegian painter, active from the 1970s until her death in 2019.

== Biography ==
Eva Margot Roux (born Johansen) was born on January 10, 1944, and grew up in a working family in Mosby, a small town ten kilometers north of Kristiansand in Norway. Very early on she revealed the gifts of designer and storyteller. A few years later, she followed a course in drawing by correspondence (NKS, Norwegian course in correspondence), and followed courses in painting with the painter Arne Solheim in Kristiansand. She left for Paris in January 1966 until 1970. Works like "Le Grand Fossard" or "Une église" testify to her stay in France. She returned to Mosby in 1971 where from 1977 she exhibitex regularly at Kristiansand.
