= Sødal =

- Neighboruhood in Kristiansand
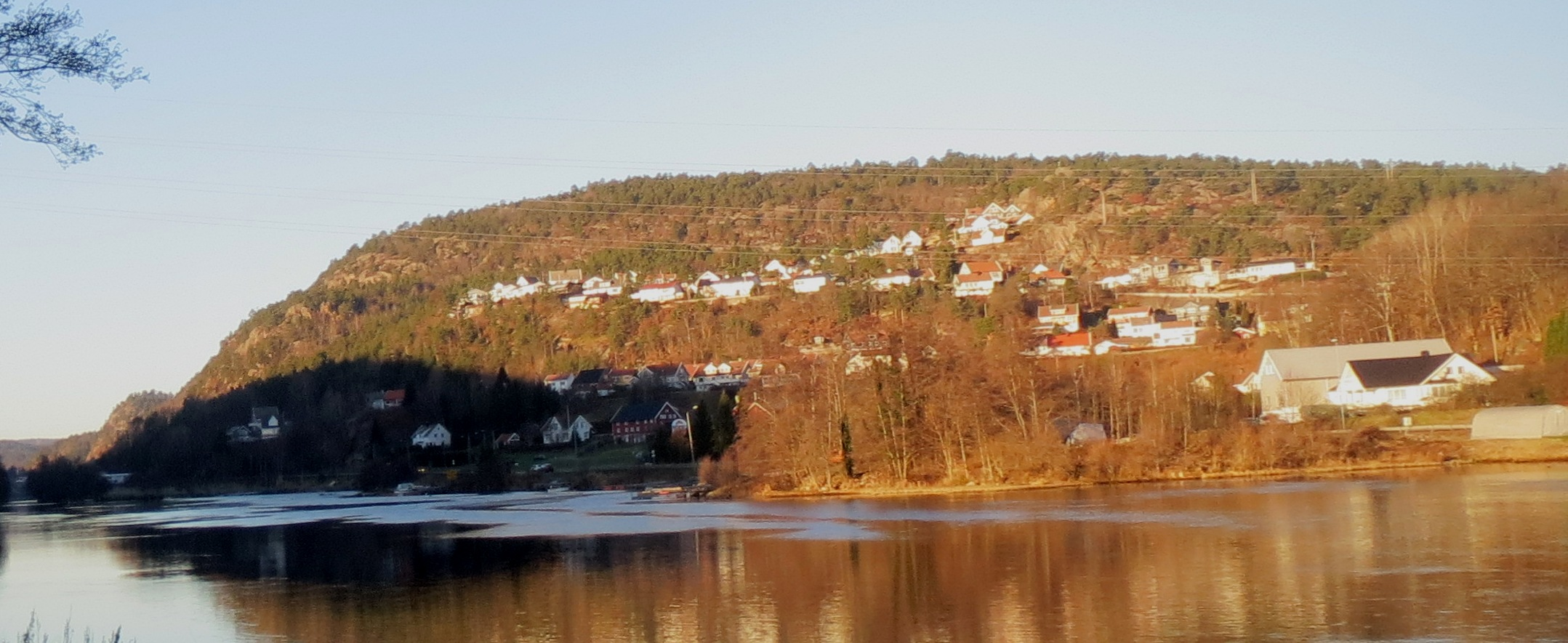
- Sødal as seen from the river Otra
- Interactive map of Sødal
- Coordinates: 58°10′12″N 7°59′07″E
- Country: Norway
- County: Agder
- City: Kristiansand
- Borough: Lund
- ZIP code: 4630
- Area code: 38

Sødal is a neighbourhood in the city of Kristiansand in Agder county, Norway. It's located in the Lund borough on the east bank of river Otra. Previously it has been farmed and a limestone quarry and a still existing lime kiln located at Sødal. In 1803, four aggressive wolves were caught in outlying areas. Sødal is currently a residential area. At the Torridalsveien (County Road 1) there is a tollgate which is a part of the toll ring around Kristiansand.

Bus lines from Sødal
Line	Destination
Line 31	Downtown (Henrik Wergelands gate) - Sødal - Kvarstein - Vennesla - Samkom
