= Pontoppidan =

Pontoppidan is a surname. Notable people with the surname include:

- Clara Pontoppidan (1883–1975), Danish actress
- Erik Pontoppidan (1698–1764), Danish author, Lutheran bishop, historian, and antiquarian
- Hendrik Pontoppidan (1814–1901), Danish merchant, consul, and philanthropist
- Henrik Pontoppidan (1857–1943), Danish realist writer, Nobel Prize for Literature in 1917
- Julie Pontoppidan (born 1996), Danish handball player
- Knud Pontoppidan (1853–1916), Danish psychiatrist and coroner, brother of Henrik Pontoppidan
