= Harald Furre =

Norwegian economist and politician

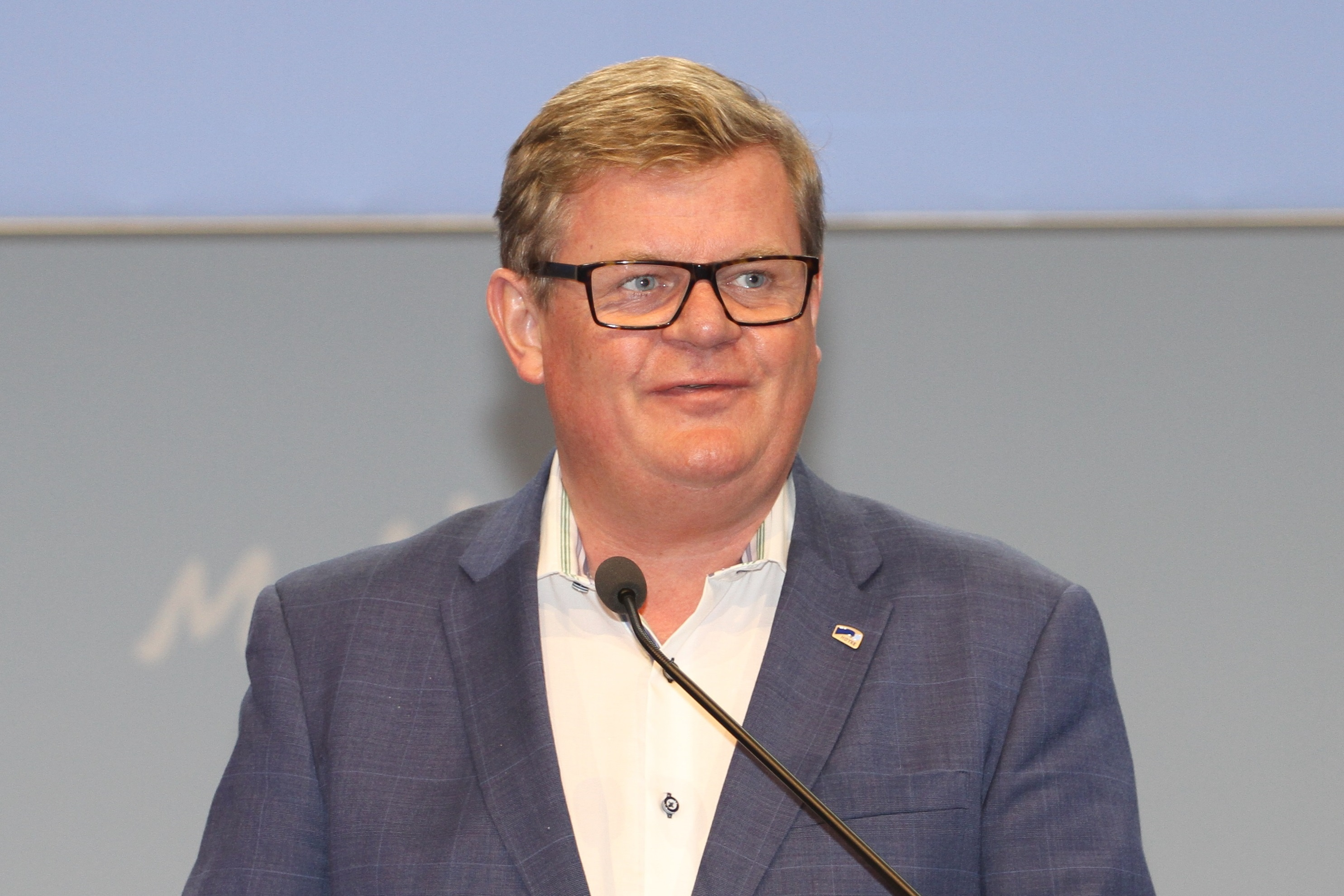
Harald Furre

Harald Furre (born 18 June 1964) is a Norwegian economist, CEO of the analyst firm Oxford Research AS in Kristiansand and politician for the Conservative Party (Norway).

Furre has an MBA from the Norwegian Business School (BI) of Oslo and has specialized postgraduate studies at the London Business School and Harvard Business School. Furre has held numerous board positions in business and politics. Furre was a member of Kristiansand City Council 1991–1999. He was the Conservative mayor candidate in Kristiansand at the municipal elections in 2015.

After a clarification by the cooperating parties after the election (2015), Harald Furre took office as the mayor of Kristiansand after Arvid Grundekjøn. He was mayor of Kristiansand 2015–2019. On 24 January 2020 Furre was appointed State Secretary in the Ministry of Local Government and Modernization of Norway.
