= Torridal Church =

Church in Agder, Norway

- Torridal kirke
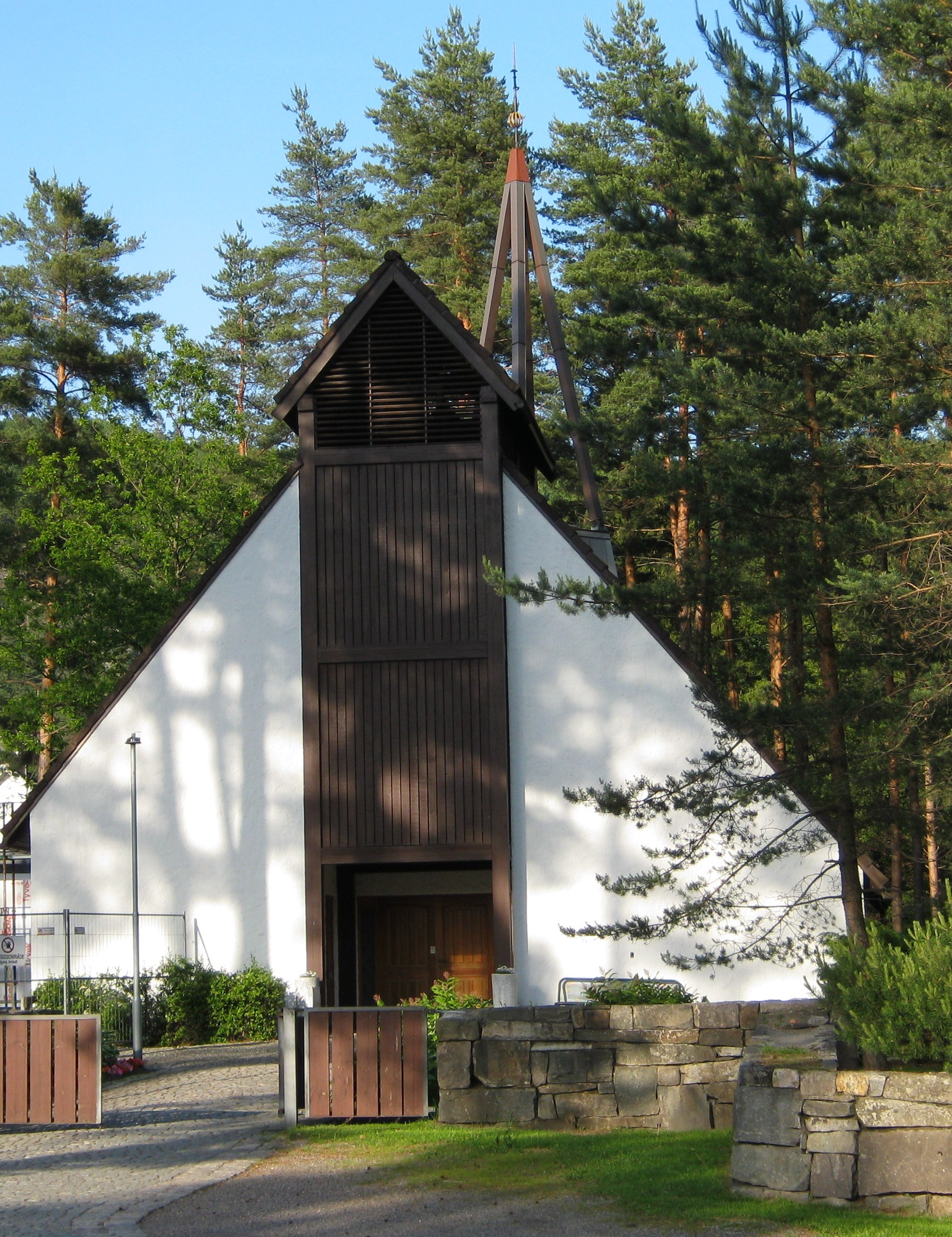
- View of the church
- Torridal Church
- 58.2045°N 07.9292°E
- Location: Kristiansand Municipality, Agder
- Country: Norway
- Denomination: Church of Norway
- Churchmanship: Evangelical Lutheran

History
- Status: Parish church
- Founded: 1978
- Consecrated: 1978

Architecture
- Functional status: Active
- Architect: Alv Erikstad
- Architectural type: Rectangular
- Completed: 1978 (48 years ago)

Specifications
- Capacity: 215
- Materials: Expanded clay aggregate

Administration
- Diocese: Agder og Telemark
- Deanery: Kristiansand domprosti
- Parish: Torridal

Torridal Church (Norwegian: Torridal kirke) is a parish church of the Church of Norway in Kristiansand Municipality in Agder county, Norway. It is located in the village of Augland, just south of the village of Mosby and just north of the village of Strai, on the west shore of the river Otra. It is the church for the Torridal parish which is part of the Kristiansand domprosti (arch-deanery) in the Diocese of Agder og Telemark. The white church was built out of expanded clay aggregate in a rectangular design in 1978 using plans drawn up by the architect Alv Erikstad. The church seats about 215 people.

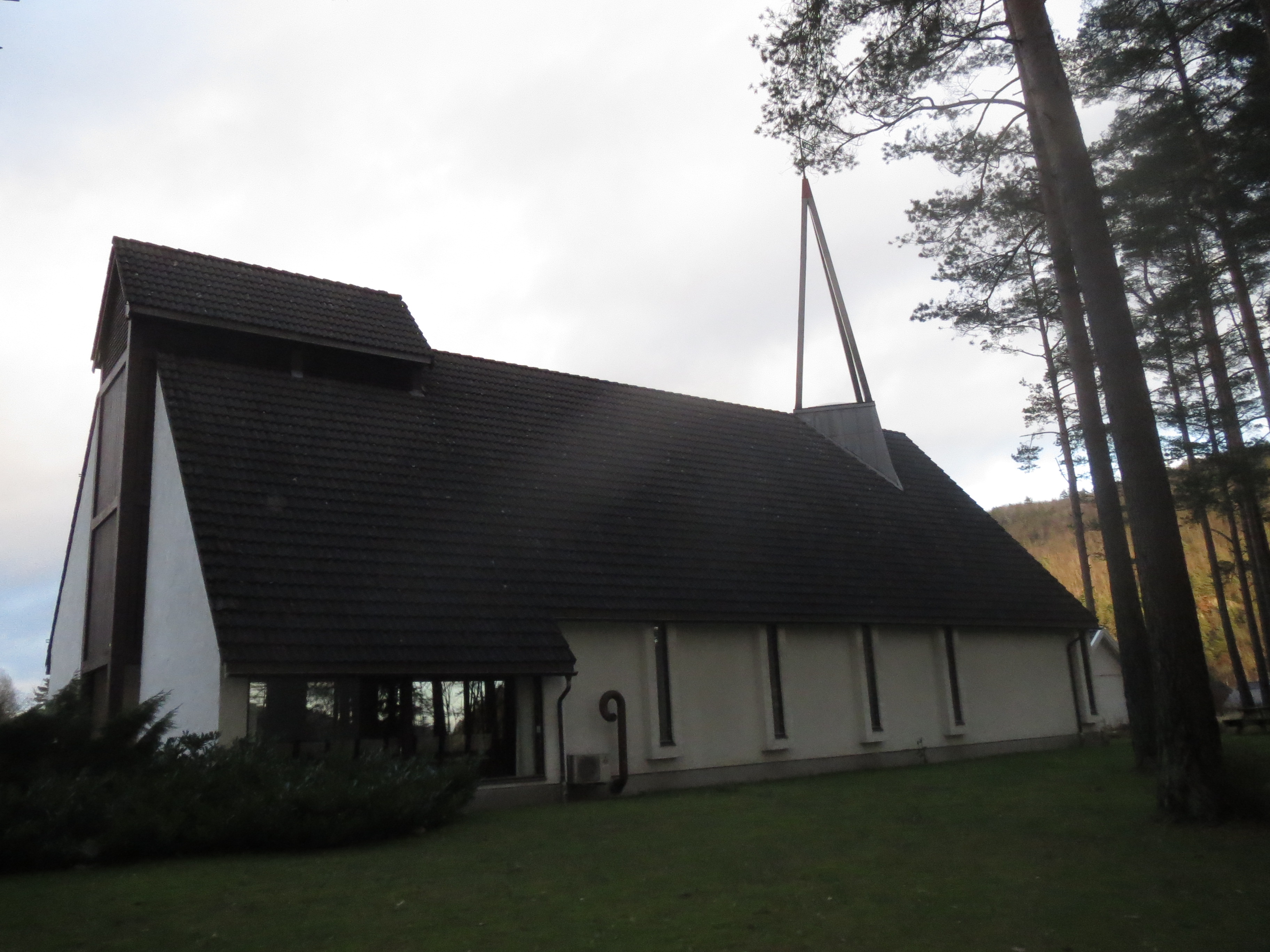
Torridal Church from south

The altarpiece is a tapestry by Else Marie Jakobsen from 1988. It represents the risen Christ. The church organ with 14 voices was created by H. Brink Hansen orgelfabrikk in 2002. The church bell was created by Olsen Nauen Bell Foundry in 2006 and has the inscription which means "The Lord is here calling for you".

In 2011, the church was enlarged with space for a new church hall as well as offices.

== See also ==
- List of churches in Agder og Telemark
