= Knud Pontoppidan =

Danish psychiatrist and coroner

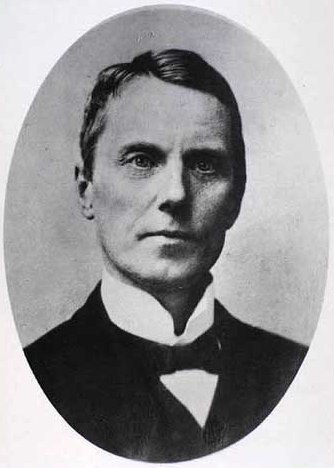
Knud Pontoppidan

Knud Børge Pontoppidan (10 July 1853–21 October 1916) was a Danish psychiatrist and coroner. The brother of writer and Nobel Prize Laureate Henrik Pontoppidan, Pontoppidan was educated at the University of Copenhagen, obtaining his doctorate with the dissertation "Den Kroniske Morfinisme" ("On Chronic Morphinism") in 1883. While employed as a lecturer in the university and Physician Superintendent at Copenhagen Municipal Hospital's historic Ward 6, Pontoppidan was during the latter half of the 1890s involved in a notable conflict with writer and feminist Amalie Skram, which received considerable press coverage and in turn forced Pontoppidan to abandon his position. After being employed for several years as Physician Superintendent at Jydske Asyl, a substantial asylum near Aarhus, Denmark, Pontoppidan returned to Copenhagen and the university as Professor of Medical Jurisprudence in 1900, a position which he held until 31 January 1914.
