= Vestre Strandgate =

Street in Kristiansand, Norway

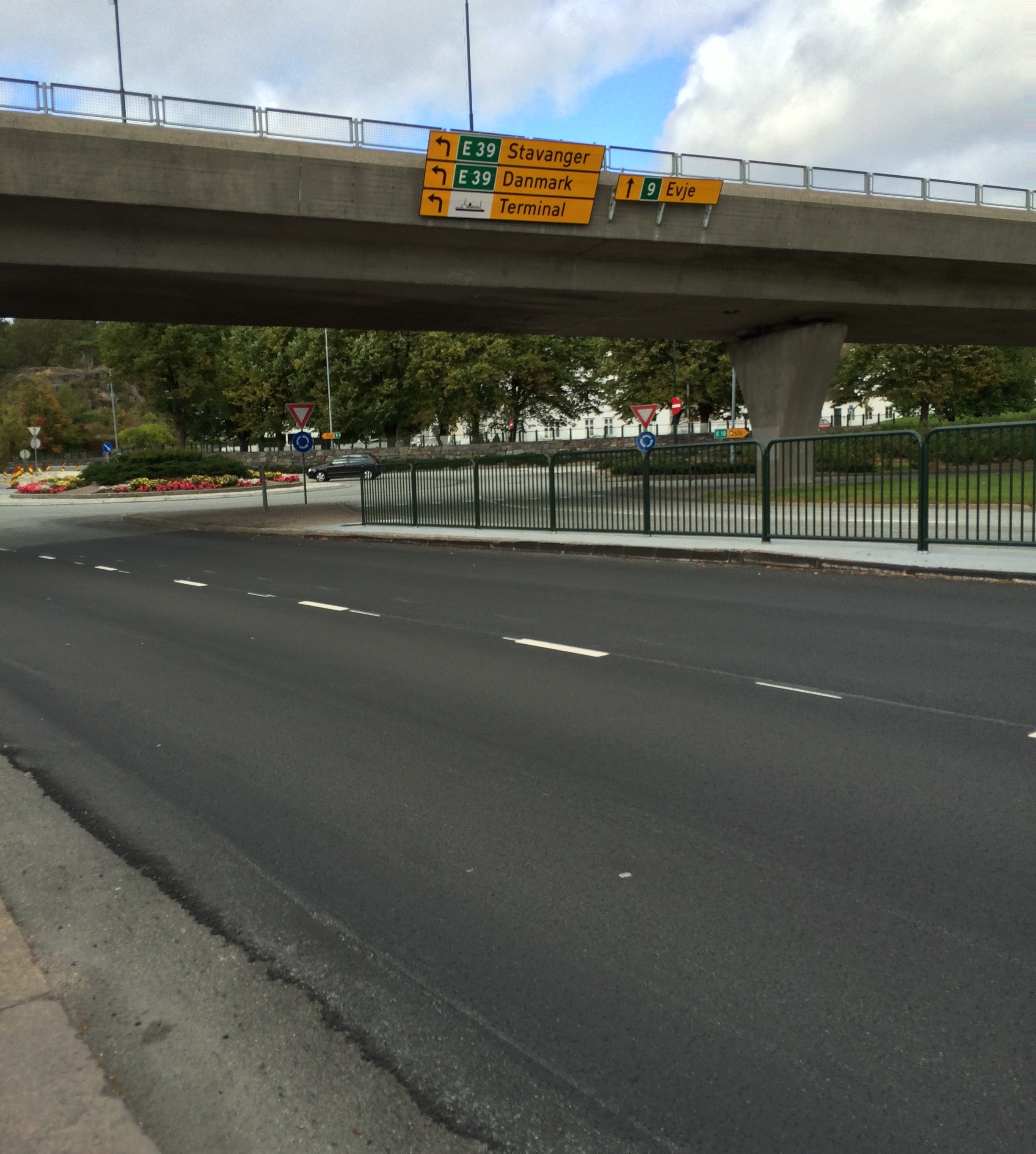
- Vestre Strandgate with Sentrumsbroen, E18
- Interactive map of Vestre Strandgate
- Length: 0.6 km (0.37 mi)
- Location: Kvadraturen, Kristiansand
- South end: Nodeviga with Østre Strandgate
- North end: Gartnerløkka with Tordenskjolds gate

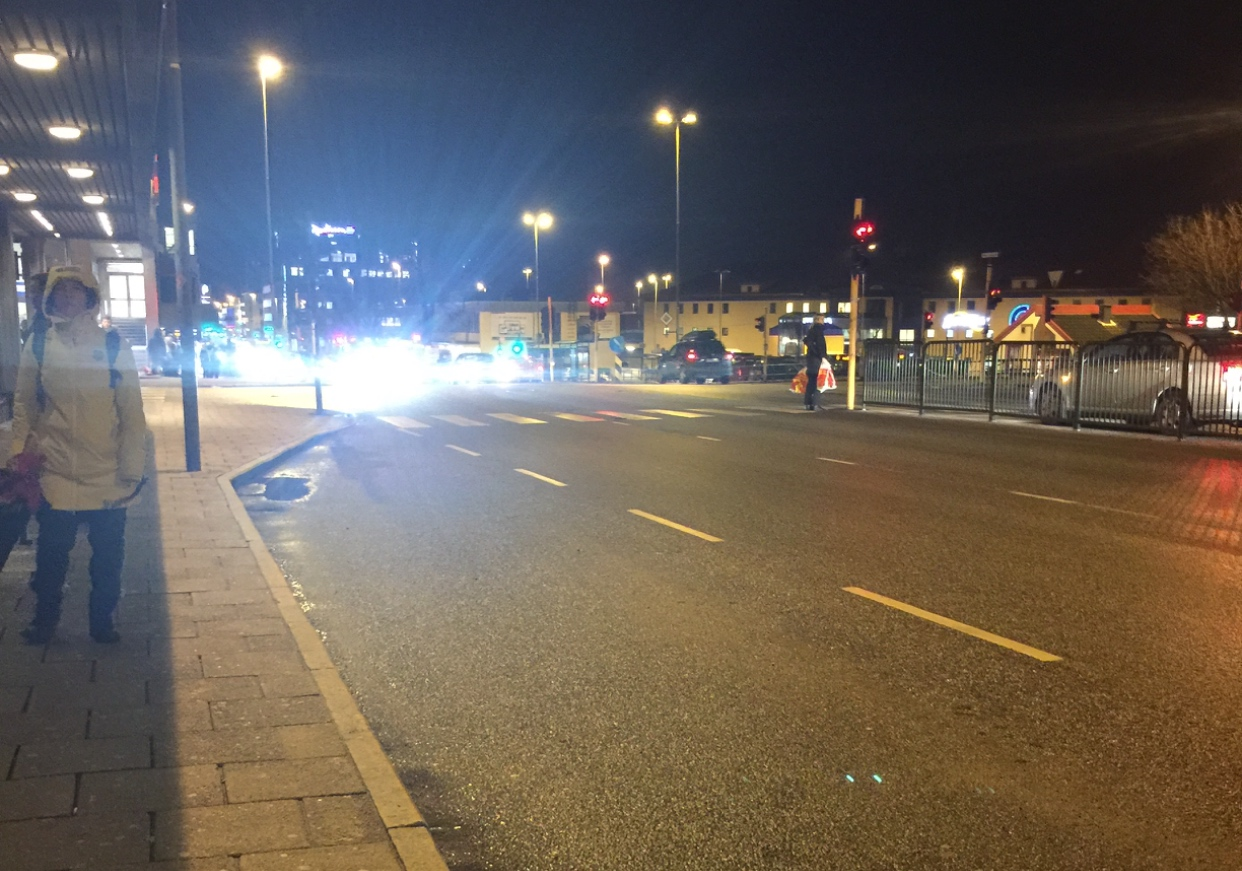
Vestre Strandgate during night

Vestre Strandgate (Western Beach-street) is a street and a road in Kristiansand, Norway. The road is a part of National Road 471 and starts after Riksvei 9 ends in Kvadraturen.

Vestre Strandgate is a dual path and pavement on both sides of the road. It is one of the busiest roads in the city center of Kristiansand and constantly has traffic during the day and long out over the nights in the weekend.

Kristiansand S and Kristiansand Bus Terminal are both located at Vestre Strandgate. Businesses, restaurants and kiosk/grocery are located on the street. Other faculties are night clubs, hotels and cafés.

Vestre Strandgate is served by two bus stops, Vestre Strandgate pl. A and Vestre Strandgate pl. B. These stops access local city buses to the Grim and Vågsbygd districts while regional and national bus routes go from the bus terminal.

Crossing streets (from north to south):

- Tordenskjolds gate
- Kristian IVs gate
- Henrik Wergelands gate
- Skippergata
- Gyldeløves gate
- Rådhusgata
- Tollbodgata
- Dronningens gate
- Kongens gate
- Østre Strandgate
