= Strai =

District Strai
- District in Kristiansand
- Coat of arms

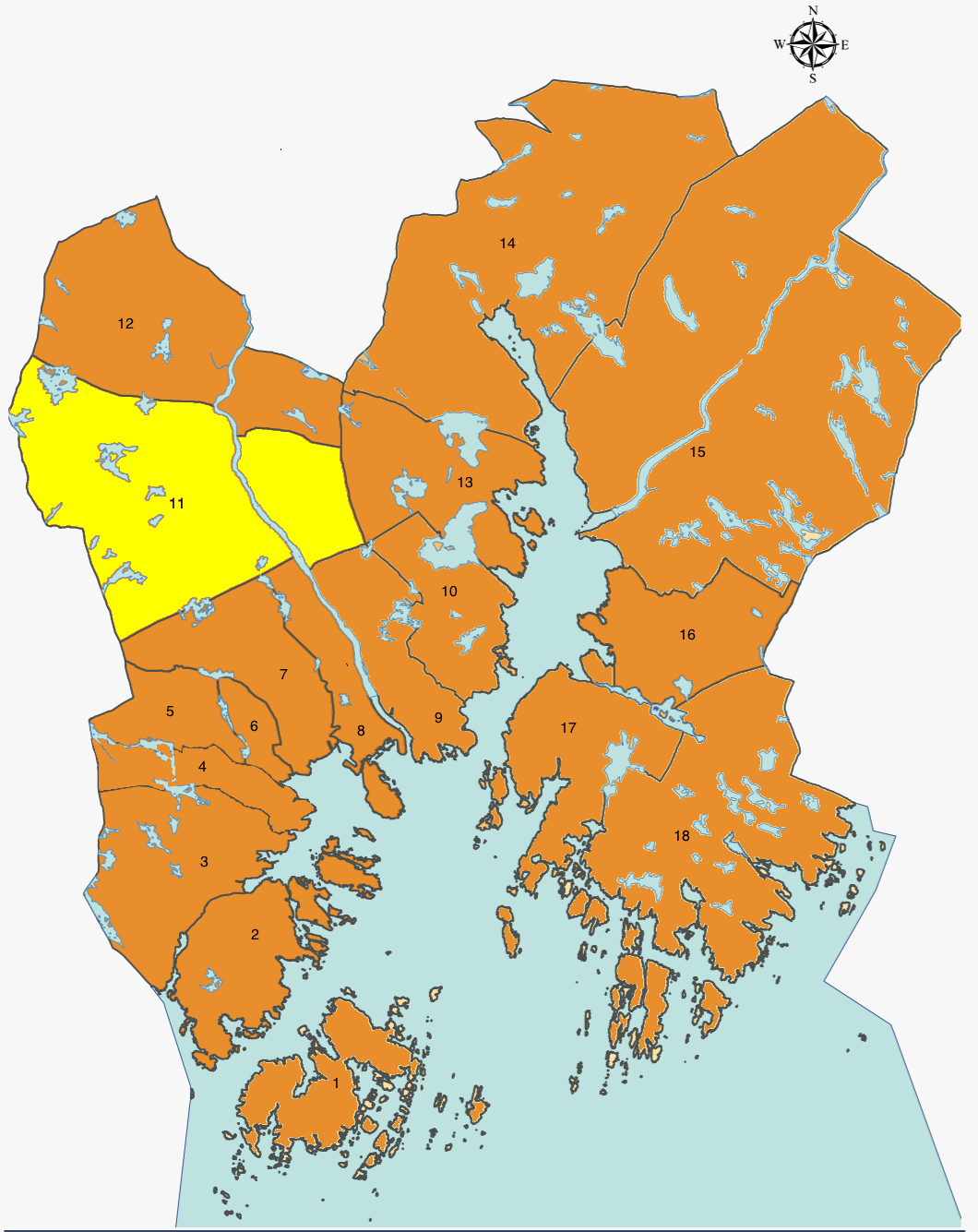
- Interactive map of District Strai
- Coordinates: 58.1893°N 7.92826°E
- Country: Norway
- Region: Southern Norway
- County: Agder
- Municipality: Kristiansand
- Borough: Grim
- Elevation: 30 m (98 ft)

Population (2014)
  - Total: 1,000
- Time zone: UTC+01:00 (CET)
  - Summer (DST): UTC+02:00 (CEST)
- ISO 3166 code: NO-030112
- Website: kristiansand.kommune.no

Strai is a village and a district in Kristiansand Municipality in Agder, Norway. It is located in the borough of Grim. Its population (2014) is about 1,000. The district of Mosby lies to the north, the districts of Lund, Kvadraturen, and Grim are located to the south, and the Songdalen area lies to the west.

The village of Strai lies on the west shore of the river Otra in the Torridal valley. The village of Mosby lies just to the north along the Norwegian National Road 9. Torridal Church is located just on the northern edge of Strai.

Bus transportation from/through Strai
Line	Destination
30	Vennesla - Kristiansand
32	Høietun - Kvadraturen
32	Høietun - Kvadraturen-UiA
511	Evje - Kristiansand
N30	Vennesla - Kristiansand
