= Norwegian County Road 482 =

Road in Norway

County Road 482
- Bokmål: Fylkesvei 482; Nynorsk: Fylkesveg 482
- Torridalsveien (Norwegian)
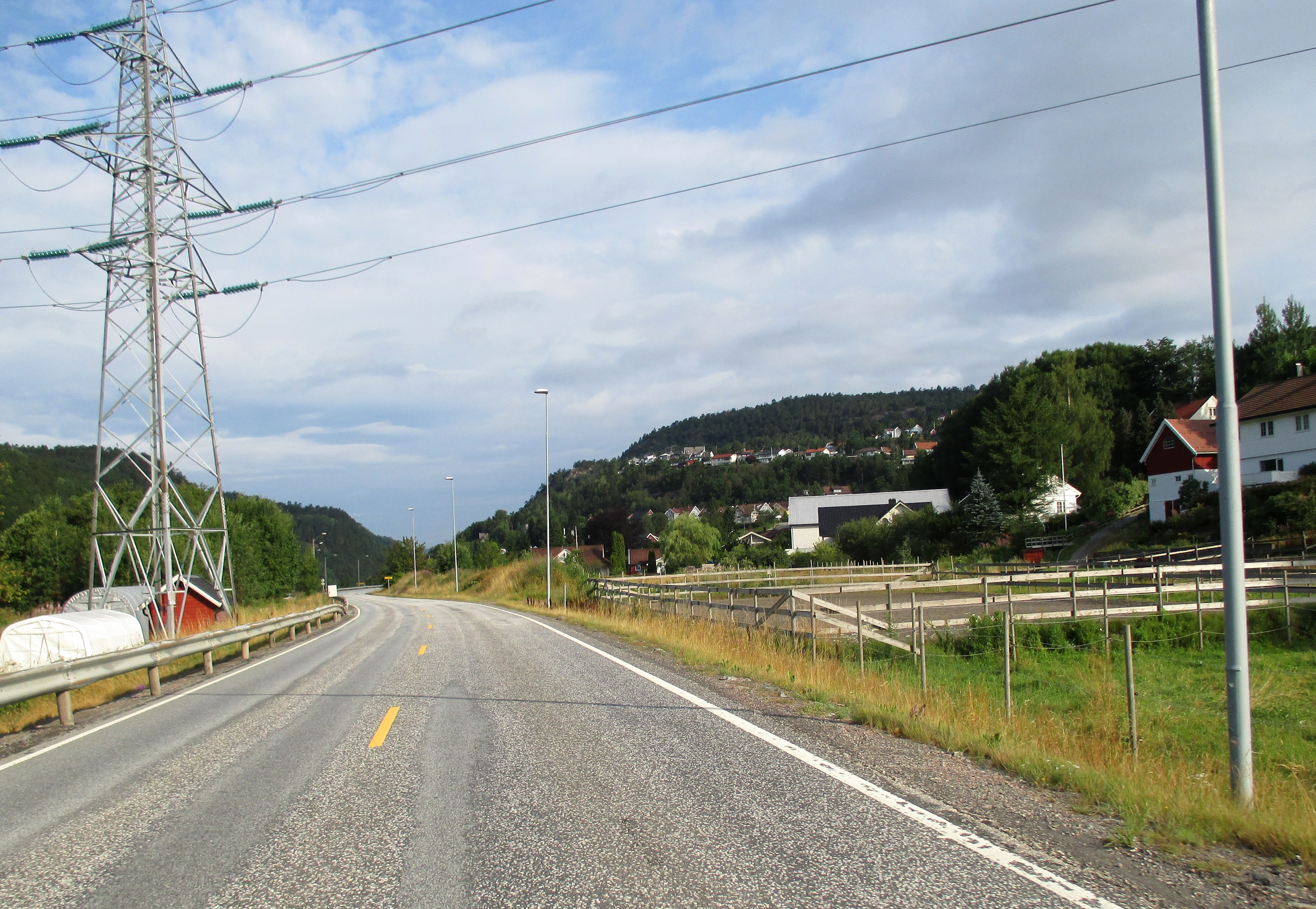
- Part of the County Road 482 (Torridalsveien)

Route information
- Length: 10.170 km (6.319 mi)

Major junctions
- South end: Fv471 in Kristiansand
- North end: Fv405 at the Kvarstein bridge

Location
- Country: Norway
- Counties: Agder
- Towns: Kristiansand, Vennesla

Highway system
- Roads in Norway; National Roads; County Roads

County Road 482 (Agder) is a road in the Torridal valley (on the east bank of Otra) between Kristiansand and Vennesla in Agder county, Norway.

== Major intersections ==
The entire route is in Agder county.

Location	km	mi	Destinations	Notes
Kristiansand	0.000	0.000	Fv471 (Østerveien)	
Kristiansand	0.657	0.408	E18 to E39 – Stavanger, Oslo	
Vennesla	10.170	6.319	Fv405 to Rv9 – Vennesla, Evje	
1.000 mi = 1.609 km; 1.000 km = 0.621 mi
