= Kristiansand Municipality =

Municipality in Agder, Norway

Kristiansand Municipality Kristiansand kommune
- Municipality
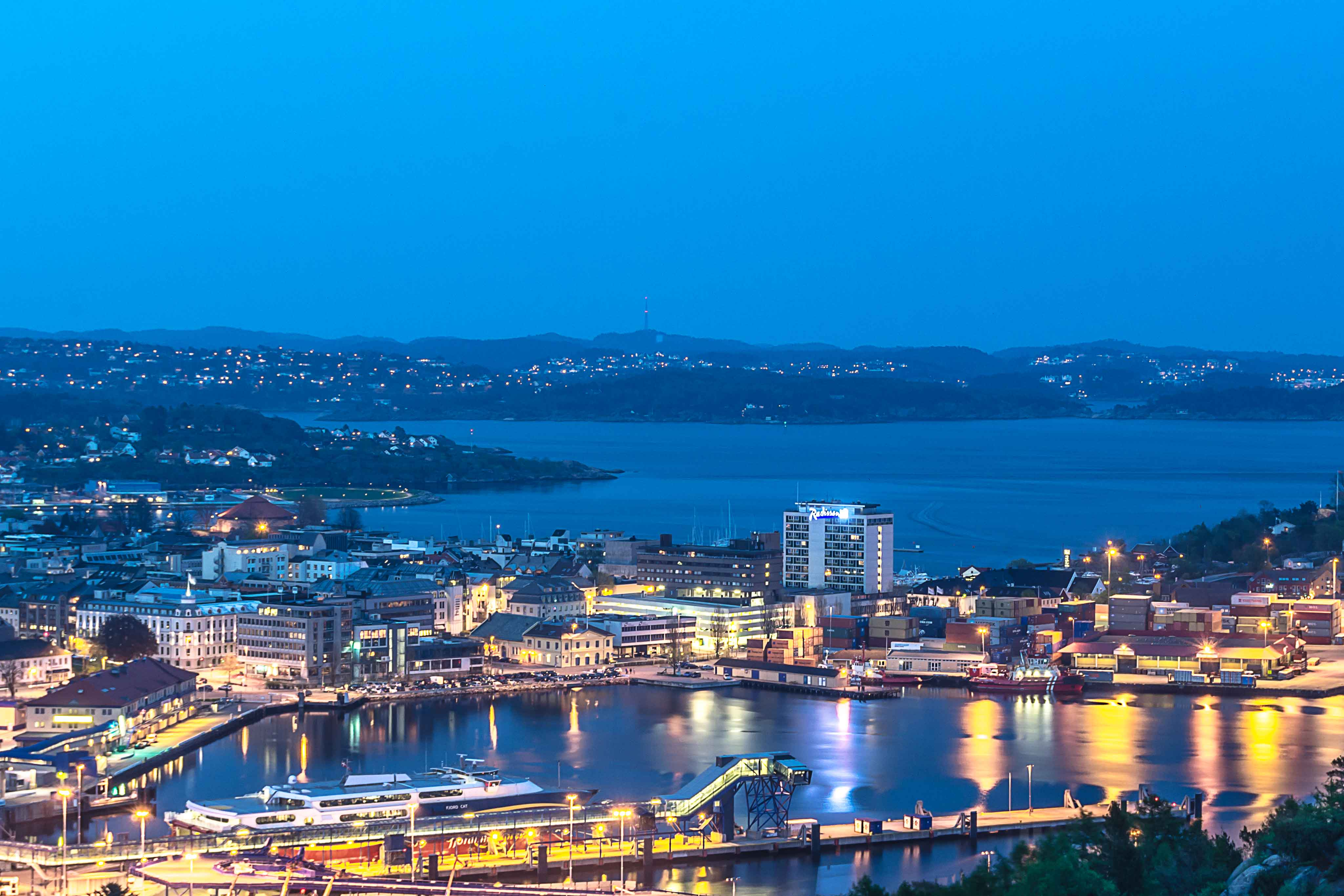
- View of the Kristiansand harbour

- Coat of arms

- Agder within Norway

- Kristiansand within Agder
- Coordinates: 58.14671°N 7.9956°E
- Country: Norway
- County: Agder
- District: Kristiansand Region
- Established: 1 Jan 1838
  - Created as: Formannskapsdistrikt
- Administrative centre: Kristiansand

Government
  - Mayor (2023): Mathias Bernander (H)

Area
  - Total: 644.63 km^{2} (248.89 sq mi)
  - Land: 610.61 km^{2} (235.76 sq mi)
  - Water: 34.02 km^{2} (13.14 sq mi) 5.3%
  - Rank: #175 in Norway
- Highest elevation: 413.76 m (1,357.5 ft)

Population (2026)
  - Total: 119,287
  - Rank: #6 in Norway
  - Density: 195.4/km^{2} (506/sq mi)
  - Change (10 years): ▲ +12.4%
- Demonym(s): Kristiansander; Kristiansandar

Official language
  - Norwegian form: Neutral
- Time zone: UTC+01:00 (CET)
  - Summer (DST): UTC+02:00 (CEST)
- ISO 3166 code: NO-4204
- Website: Official website

Kristiansand (Norwegian pronunciation: [ˈkrɪstɪansan]) is a municipality in Agder county, Norway. The administrative centre of the municipality is the city of Kristiansand, located along the coast of the large municipality. The city is also the administrative centre of Agder county. In addition to the city of Kristiansand, there are several other notable villages and urban areas throughout the municipality including: Finsland, Høllen, Ny-Hellesund, Skålevik, Tveit, Korsvik, Volleberg, Nodeland, Brennåsen, and Søgne.

The 644.63-square-kilometre (248.89 sq mi) municipality is the 175th largest by area out of the 357 municipalities in Norway. Kristiansand Municipality is the 6th most populous municipality in Norway with a population of 119,287. The municipality's population density is 195.4 inhabitants per square kilometre (506/sq mi) and its population has increased by 12.4% over the previous 10-year period.

Tourism is very important in Kristiansand Municipality, and the summer season is the most popular for tourists. Kristiansand Zoo and Amusement Park is the largest zoo in Norway, located to the northeast of the city of Kristiansand. It receives over 900,000 visitors every year. Markens Street is the main pedestrian street in downtown Kristiansand where there are many shops and restaurats. Bystranda is a city beach located in Kvadraturen; Hamresanden beach is the longest beach in the municipality, located along the Topdalsfjorden. Hamresanden Camping is a popular family activity during the summer season. The city hosts a free weekly concert in downtown Kristiansand in the summertime. Outside the city is the industrial park Sørlandsparken, which includes Sørlandssenteret, Norway's largest mall. There are many holiday cottages and summer homes along the coast and on the many small coastal islands in the Skagerrak to the south.

== General information ==
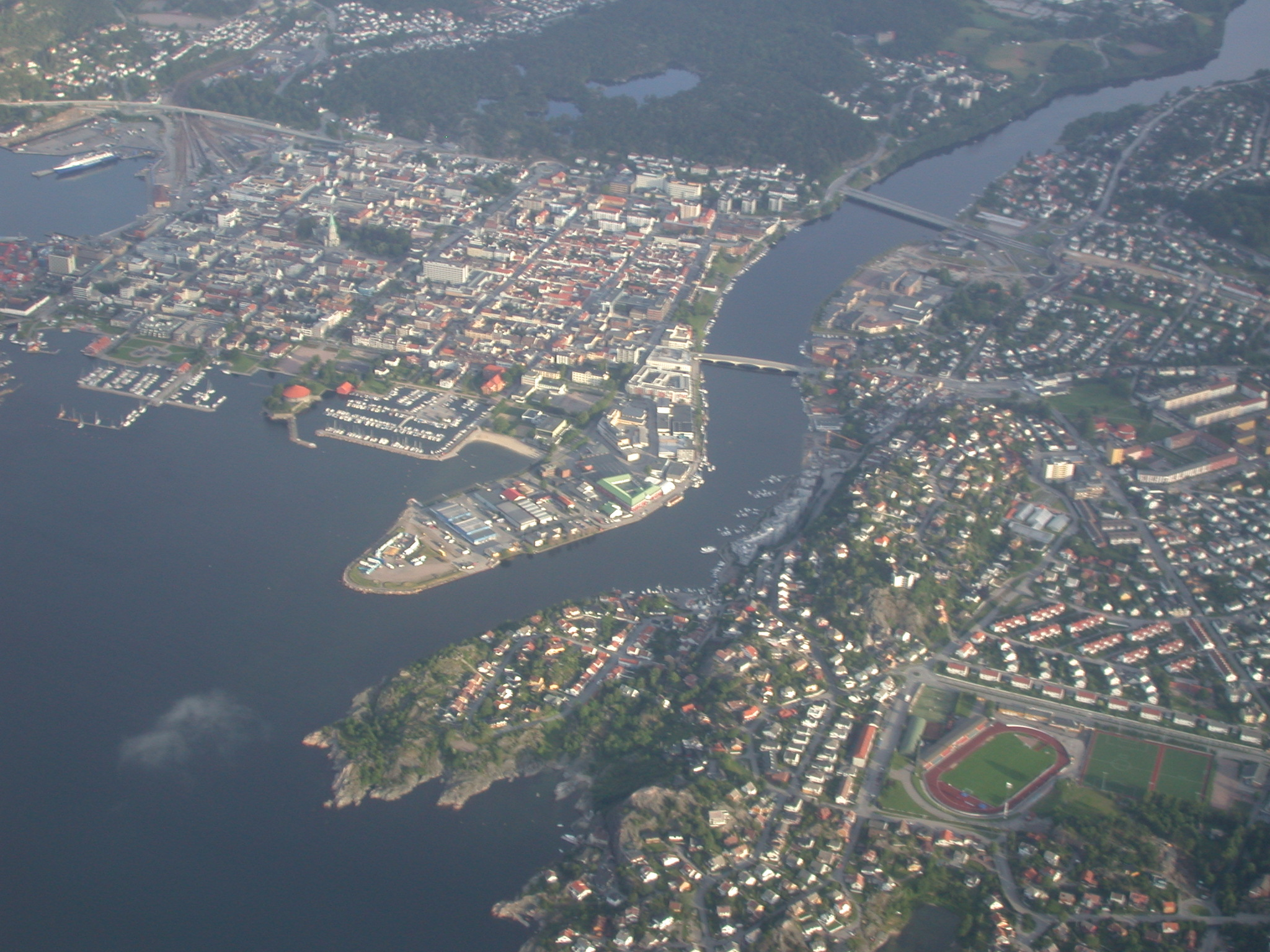
Aerial view of the centre of the city of Kristiansand

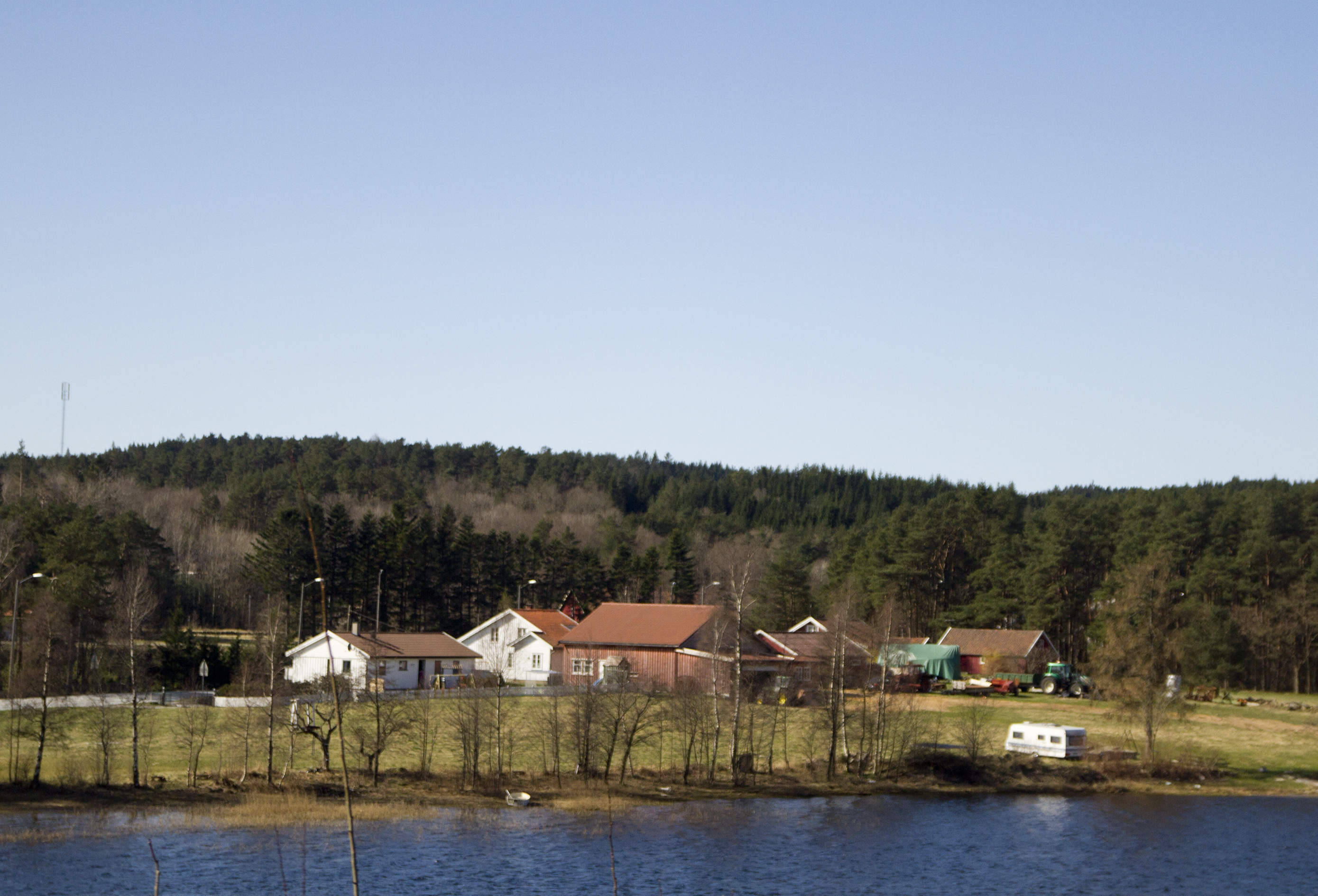
View of Møllebakken in Songdalen

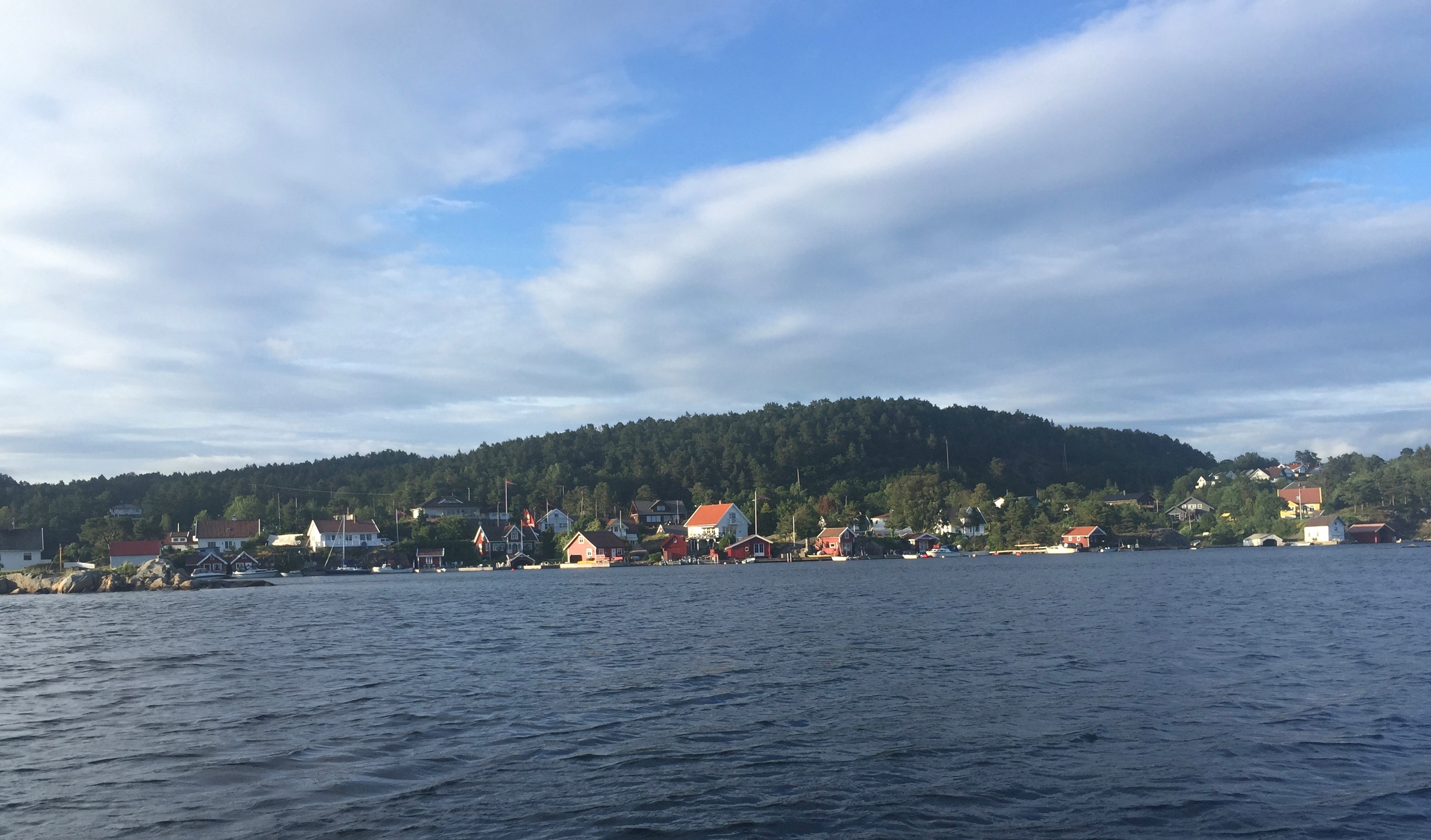
View of Trysnes in Søgne

The kjøpstad (city) of Christianssand (later spelled Kristiansand) was established as a municipality on 1 January 1838 (see formannskapsdistrikt law). Initially, the municipality and the small city had the same boundaries. On 1 July 1921, a large area (population: 2,164) of Oddernes Municipality was transferred into the city, greatly increasing the size of the city-municipality.

During the 1960s, there were many municipal mergers across Norway due to the work of the Schei Committee. On 1 January 1965, the following areas were merged to form a much larger Kristiansand Municipality which included the city center and large rural areas surrounding the city:

- all of Kristiansand Municipality (population: 27,100)
- all of Oddernes Municipality (population: 18,668)
- all of Randesund Municipality (population: 1,672)
- all of Tveit Municipality (population: 2,802)

In 2020, there were many municipal and county mergers across Norway due to the work of the Solberg cabinet. Historically, this municipality was part of the old Vest-Agder county. On 1 January 2020, the municipality became a part of the newly-formed Agder county (after Aust-Agder and Vest-Agder counties were merged). Also on 1 January 2020, the following areas were merged to form a much larger Kristiansand Municipality:

- all of Kristiansand Municipality (population: 92,282)
- all of Songdalen Municipality (population: 6,706)
- all of Søgne Municipality (population: 11,403)

=== Name ===
The municipality is named after the historic city of Christianssand (later spelled Kristiansand). The city itself was named after the Dano-Norwegian King Christian IV, who founded the city on 5 July 1641. The first element of the name is Christian or the more modern Norwegian spelling Kristian, the name of the King. The second element of the city's name, sand, comes from the Old Norse word sandr which means "sand" or "sandy ground". This refers to the sandy headland upon which the city was originally built.

Historically, the name was usually written Christianssand until 1877, although the map of the mapmaker Pontoppidan from 1785 spelled the name Christiansand (with a single 's'). In 1877, an official spelling reform aimed at bringing city names into line with modern Norwegian orthography changed the Ch to K so the name became Kristianssand. The other Norwegian cities of Kristiansund and Kristiania (Oslo), also had their spellings changed under the same reform. Despite that, a number of businesses and associations retain the "Ch" spelling. The name was again changed to its present form, Kristiansand (single "s"), in 1889.

In 2012, the city's mayor, Arvid Grundekjøn, proposed that the city be renamed Christianssand, arguing that "Kristiansand" is grammatically meaningless and that Christianssand stands for tradition. This proposal was not well received by the locals and the mayor has not pushed this further.

=== Coat-of-arms ===
The coat of arms of Kristiansand was granted on 8 December 1909 and were based on the oldest seal of the city, dating from 1643. In 1643, King Christian IV granted the young town the right to use a seal with the Norwegian lion and the royal crown. The crown indicates that the city was founded by the king. The other major element in the arms is a tree. As the species of tree is not specified, there are several known versions with differently shaped trees. A second seal, from 1658, shows a tree with leaves and what look like pine cones. On the base of the crown are the letters R. F. P., standing for Regna Firma Pietas which means "Piety strengthens the realm"; this was Christian IV's motto. Around the seal of the city is its motto, Cavsa Triumphat Tandem Bona which means "A good cause prevails in the end".

=== Churches ===
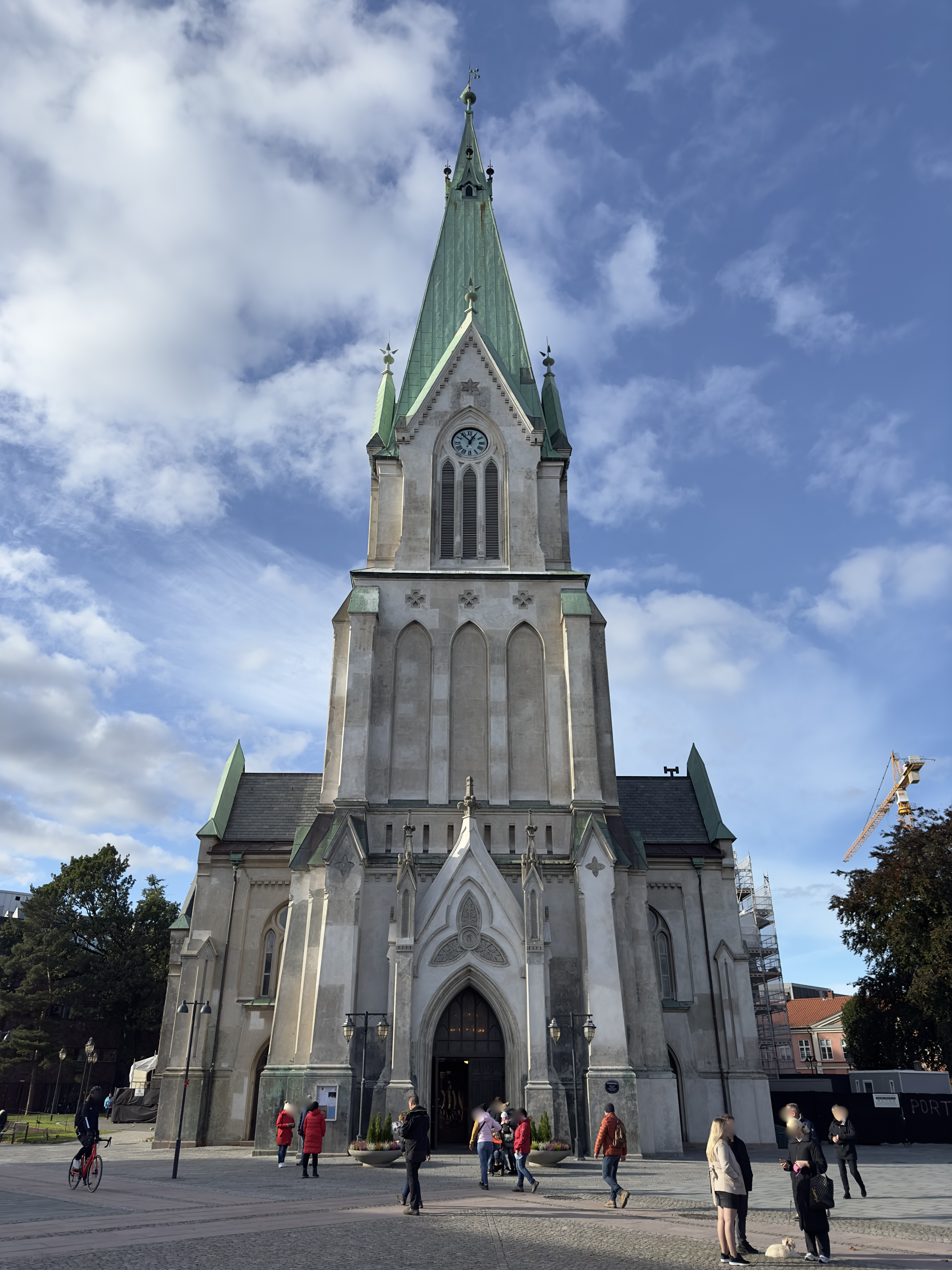
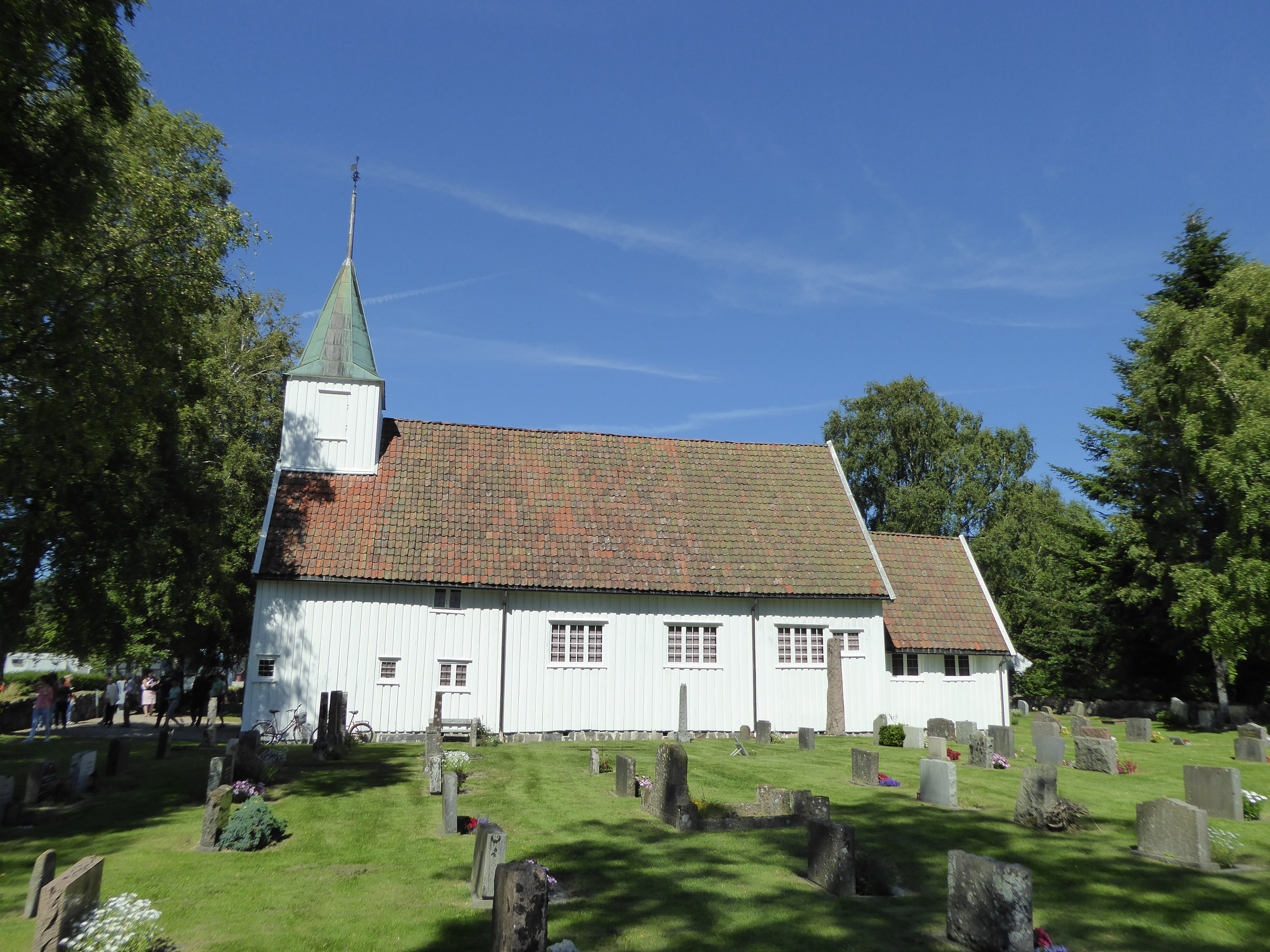
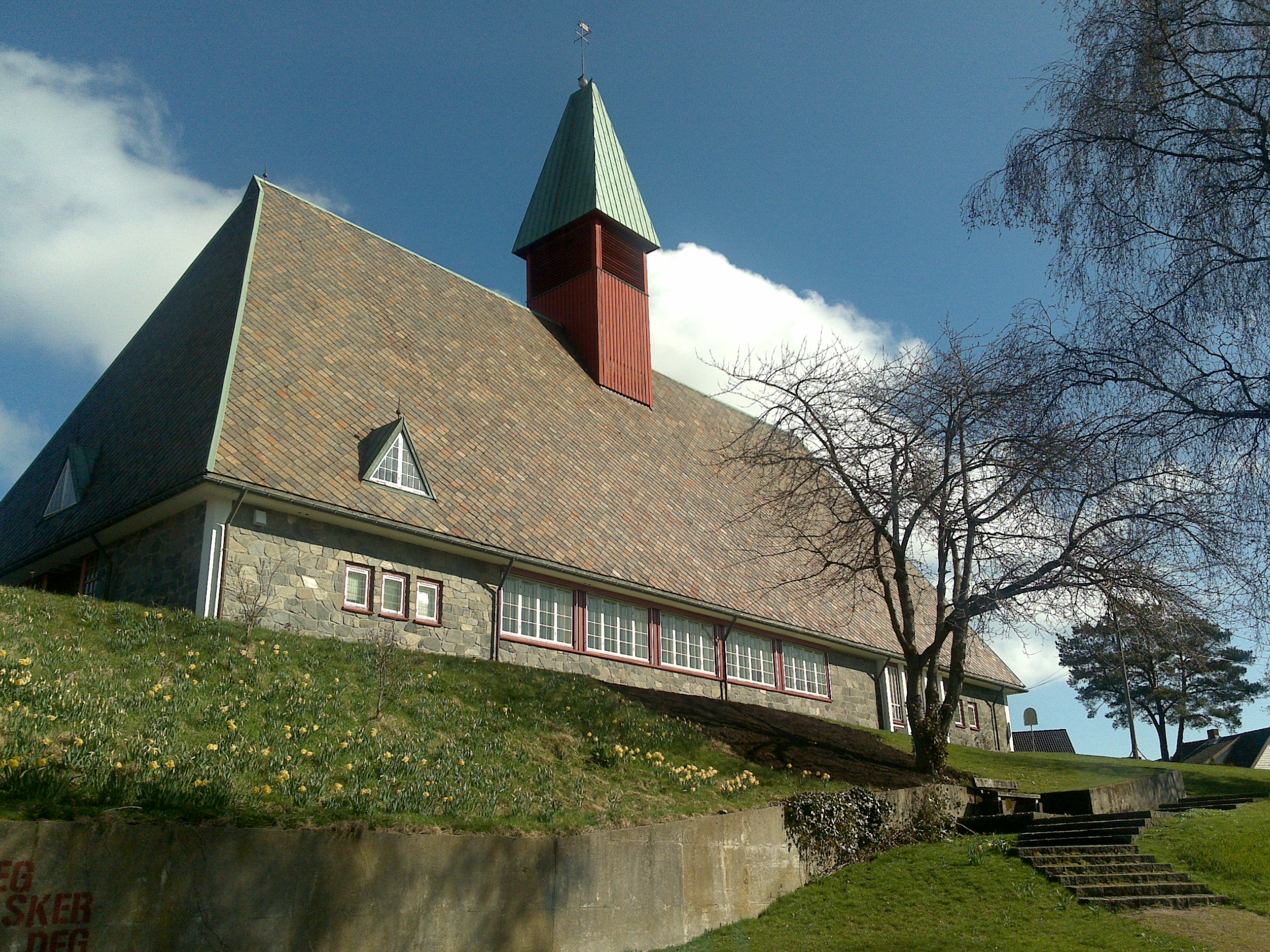
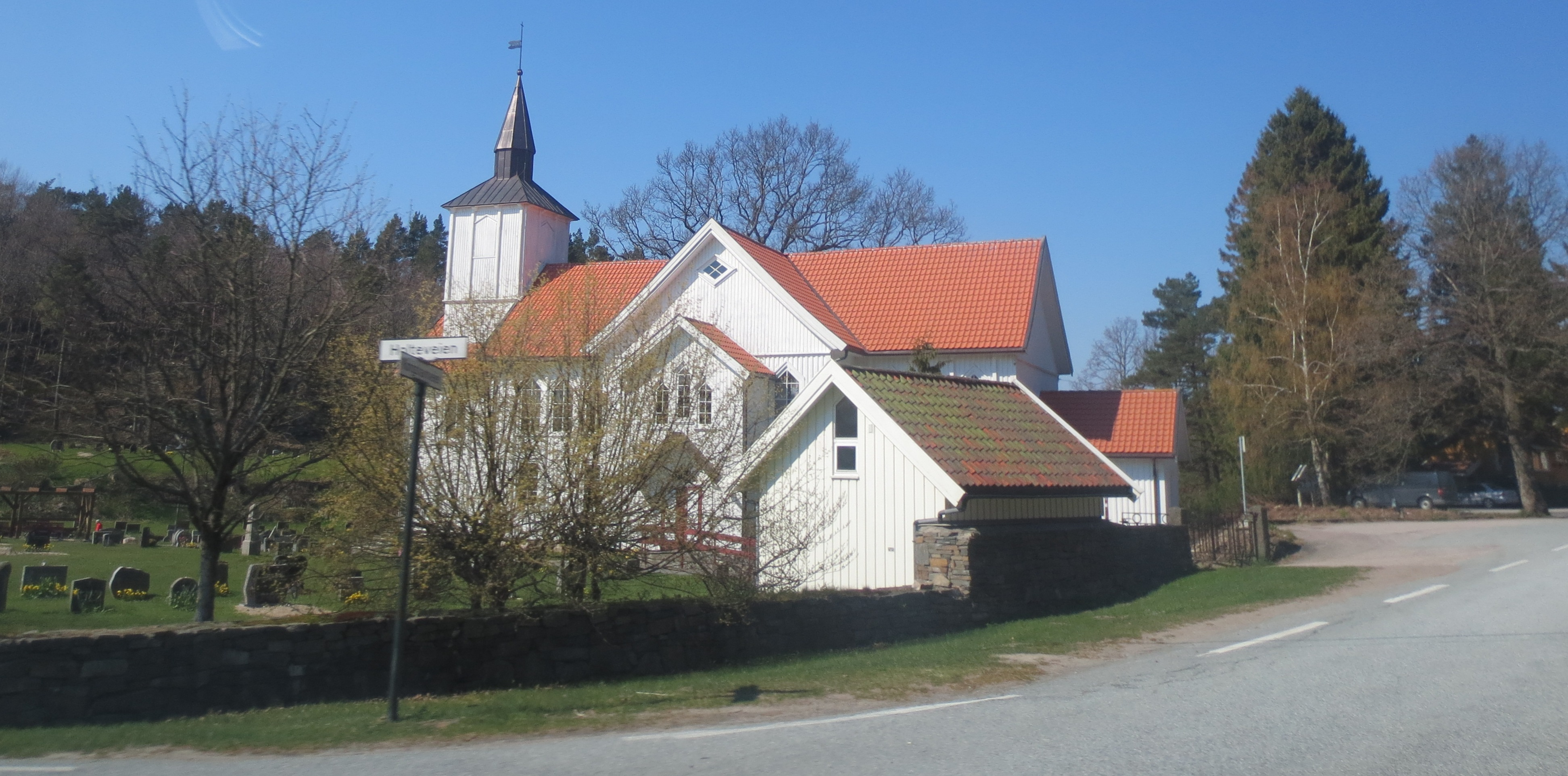

The Church of Norway has 15 parishes (sokn) within Kristiansand Municipality. It is part of the Kristiansand domprosti (arch-deanery) in the Diocese of Agder.

Churches in Kristiansand Municipality
Parish (sokn)	Church name	Location of the church	Year built
Kristiansand domkirke	Kristiansand Cathedral	Kristiansand	1884
Finsland	Finsland Church	Finsland	1803
Flekkerøy	Flekkerøy Church	Flekkerøy	1960
Greipstad	Greipstad Church	Nodeland	1829
Grim	Grim Church	Grim	1969
Hellemyr	Hellemyr Church	Hellemyr	1988
Hånes	Hånes Church	Hånes	1986
Lund	Lund Church	Lund	1987
Oddernes	Justvik Church	Justvik	1985
Oddernes	Oddernes Church	Lund	c. 1040
Randesund	Randesund Church	Randesund	1864
Randesund	Søm Church	Søm	2004
Søgne	Søgne Church	Lunde	1861
Søgne	Old Søgne Church	Søgne	1604
Torridal	Torridal Church	Augland	1978
Tveit	Tveit Church	Tveit	c. 1100
Voie	Voie Church	Voie	1990
Vågsbygd	Vågsbygd Church	Vågsbygd	1967

== Geography ==
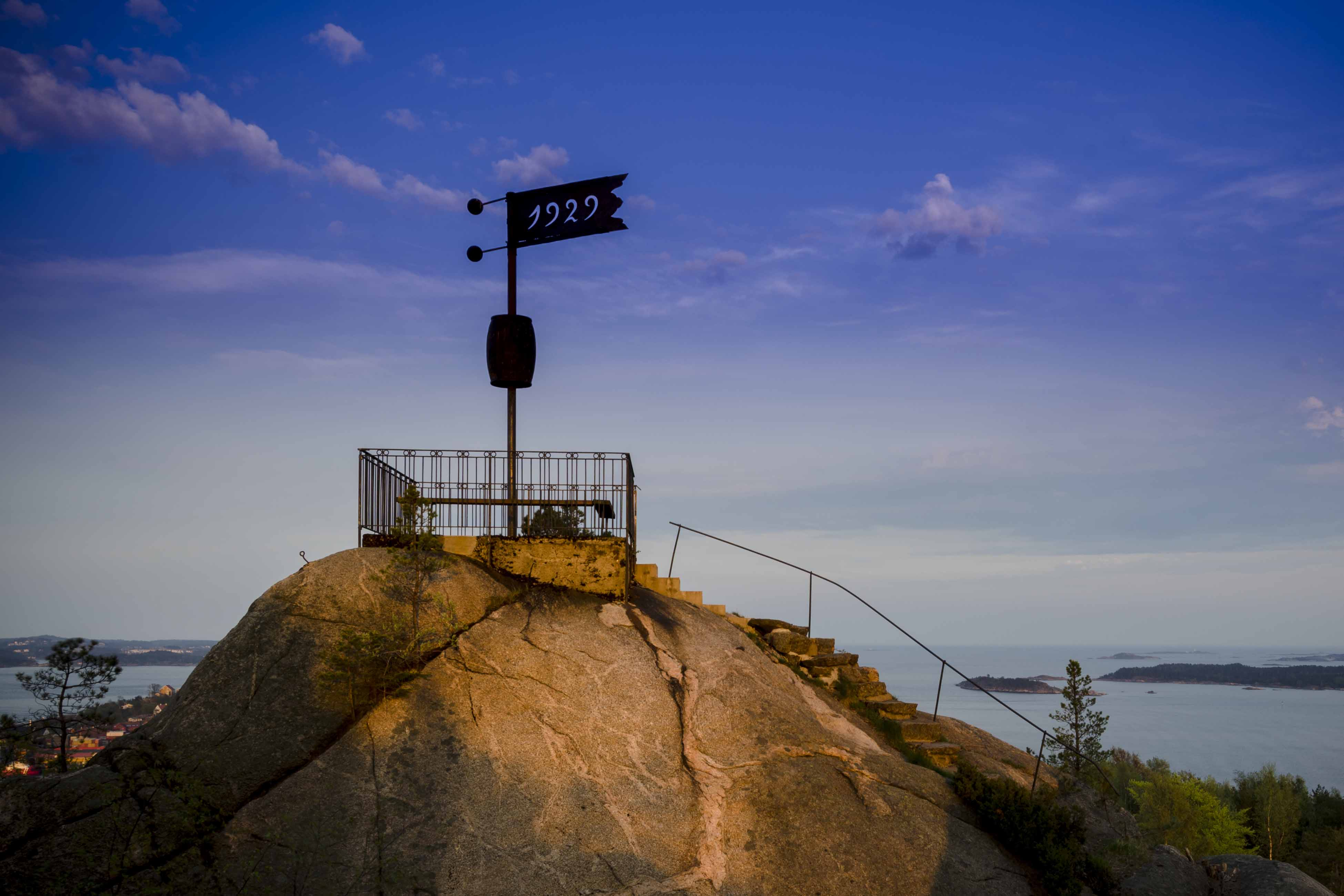
Dueknipen, Kristiansand

Kristiansand Municipality is located along the Skagerrak. Until the opening of the Kiel Canal between the North Sea and the Baltic Sea, the Skagerrak was very important militarily and geopolitically. This meant that for centuries it served as a military stronghold, first as Harald Fairhair's royal residence, then as a Danish-Norwegian fortress, and later as a garrison town. Kristiansand is a gateway to and from the continent, with ferry service to Denmark and a terminus of the railway line along the southern edge of South Norway.

Outside of the city, there are forests, rivers, and large hilly areas. Two major rivers flow through the municipality: the Otra and the Tovdalselva. Both flow into the Skagerrak at in the city of Kristiansand. The highest point in the municipality is the 413.76-metre (1,357.5 ft) tall mountain Havsåsknotten, located a short distance northeast of the village of Finsland in the northern part of the municipality.

== Government ==
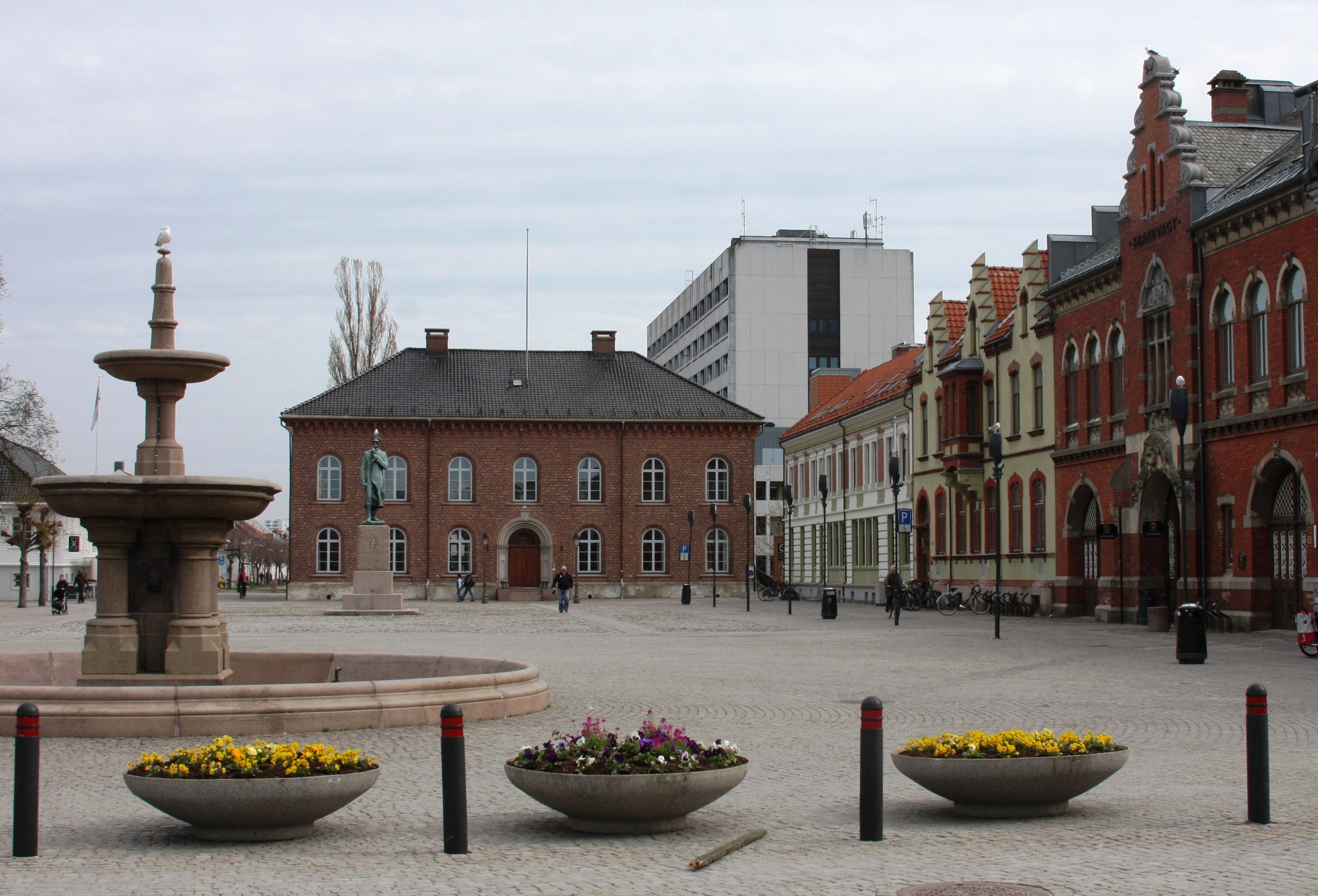
Kristiansand City Hall

Kristiansand Municipality is responsible for primary education (through 10th grade), outpatient health services, senior citizen services, welfare and other social services, zoning, economic development, and municipal roads and utilities. The municipality is governed by a municipal council of directly elected representatives. The mayor is indirectly elected by a vote of the municipal council. The municipality is under the jurisdiction of the Agder District Court and the Agder Court of Appeal.

Kristiansand Municipality has no local parliamentary government, but is managed by the municipal council and an executive committee. The mayor is the spokesman for the city, head of the council and leader of the executive committee. In Kristiansand the mayor has represented the center-right parties since the late 1940s.

=== Municipal council ===
The municipal council (Bystyre) of Kristiansand Municipality is made up of 57 representatives that are elected to four year terms. The tables below show the current and historical composition of the council by political party.

Kristiansand bystyre 2023–2027
Party name (in Norwegian)	Number of representatives
Labour Party (Arbeiderpartiet)	8
Progress Party (Fremskrittspartiet)	5
Green Party (Miljøpartiet De Grønne)	2
Conservative Party (Høyre)	17
Industry and Business Party (Industri‑ og Næringspartiet)	1
The Conservatives (Konservativt)	1
Christian Democratic Party (Kristelig Folkeparti)	7
The Center Party (Partiet Sentrum)	1
Pensioners' Party (Pensjonistpartiet)	3
Red Party (Rødt)	2
Centre Party (Senterpartiet)	2
Socialist Left Party (Sosialistisk Venstreparti)	4
Liberal Party (Venstre)	3
Kleppe List (Kleppelista)	1
Total number of members:	57

Kristiansand bystyre 2019–2023
Party name (in Norwegian)	Number of representatives
Labour Party (Arbeiderpartiet)	13
Progress Party (Fremskrittspartiet)	4
Green Party (Miljøpartiet De Grønne)	6
Conservative Party (Høyre)	13
The Christians Party (Partiet De Kristne)	1
Christian Democratic Party (Kristelig Folkeparti)	8
The Democrats (Demokratene)	10
Pensioners' Party (Pensjonistpartiet)	1
Red Party (Rødt)	2
Centre Party (Senterpartiet)	3
Socialist Left Party (Sosialistisk Venstreparti)	4
Liberal Party (Venstre)	2
Cross-party people's list for all Kristiansand (Tverrpolitisk Folkeliste For Hele Kristiansand)	4
Total number of members:	71

Kristiansand bystyre 2015–2019
Party name (in Norwegian)	Number of representatives
Labour Party (Arbeiderpartiet)	15
Progress Party (Fremskrittspartiet)	4
Green Party (Miljøpartiet De Grønne)	3
Conservative Party (Høyre)	13
Christian Democratic Party (Kristelig Folkeparti)	8
The Democrats (Demokratene)	2
Pensioners' Party (Pensjonistpartiet)	1
Red Party (Rødt)	1
Centre Party (Senterpartiet)	1
Socialist Left Party (Sosialistisk Venstreparti)	2
Liberal Party (Venstre)	3
Total number of members:	53

Kristiansand bystyre 2011–2015
Party name (in Norwegian)	Number of representatives
Labour Party (Arbeiderpartiet)	14
Progress Party (Fremskrittspartiet)	6
Green Party (Miljøpartiet De Grønne)	1
Conservative Party (Høyre)	14
Christian Democratic Party (Kristelig Folkeparti)	9
The Democrats (Demokratene)	2
Pensioners' Party (Pensjonistpartiet)	2
Red Party (Rødt)	1
Socialist Left Party (Sosialistisk Venstreparti)	1
Liberal Party (Venstre)	3
Total number of members:	53

Kristiansand bystyre 2007–2011
Party name (in Norwegian)	Number of representatives
Labour Party (Arbeiderpartiet)	11
Progress Party (Fremskrittspartiet)	9
Green Party (Miljøpartiet De Grønne)	1
Conservative Party (Høyre)	11
Christian Democratic Party (Kristelig Folkeparti)	10
The Democrats (Demokratene)	2
Pensioners' Party (Pensjonistpartiet)	3
Red Electoral Alliance (Rød Valgallianse)	1
Centre Party (Senterpartiet)	1
Socialist Left Party (Sosialistisk Venstreparti)	2
Liberal Party (Venstre)	2
Total number of members:	53

Kristiansand bystyre 2003–2007
Party name (in Norwegian)	Number of representatives
Labour Party (Arbeiderpartiet)	8
Progress Party (Fremskrittspartiet)	8
Green Party (Miljøpartiet De Grønne)	2
Conservative Party (Høyre)	11
Christian Democratic Party (Kristelig Folkeparti)	10
The Democrats (Demokratene)	2
Pensioners' Party (Pensjonistpartiet)	1
Centre Party (Senterpartiet)	1
Socialist Left Party (Sosialistisk Venstreparti)	8
Liberal Party (Venstre)	2
Total number of members:	53

Kristiansand bystyre 1999–2003
Party name (in Norwegian)	Number of representatives
Labour Party (Arbeiderpartiet)	9
Progress Party (Fremskrittspartiet)	10
Green Party (Miljøpartiet De Grønne)	1
Conservative Party (Høyre)	15
Christian Democratic Party (Kristelig Folkeparti)	10
Pensioners' Party (Pensjonistpartiet)	1
Socialist Left Party (Sosialistisk Venstreparti)	4
Liberal Party (Venstre)	3
Total number of members:	53

Kristiansand bystyre 1995–1999
Party name (in Norwegian)	Number of representatives
Labour Party (Arbeiderpartiet)	11
Progress Party (Fremskrittspartiet)	8
Green Party (Miljøpartiet De Grønne)	1
Conservative Party (Høyre)	12
Christian Democratic Party (Kristelig Folkeparti)	11
Pensioners' Party (Pensjonistpartiet)	3
Red Electoral Alliance (Rød Valgallianse)	1
Centre Party (Senterpartiet)	1
Socialist Left Party (Sosialistisk Venstreparti)	2
Liberal Party (Venstre)	3
Total number of members:	53

Kristiansand bystyre 1991–1995
Party name (in Norwegian)	Number of representatives
Labour Party (Arbeiderpartiet)	12
Progress Party (Fremskrittspartiet)	8
Conservative Party (Høyre)	19
Christian Democratic Party (Kristelig Folkeparti)	14
Pensioners' Party (Pensjonistpartiet)	10
Red Electoral Alliance (Rød Valgallianse)	1
Centre Party (Senterpartiet)	3
Socialist Left Party (Sosialistisk Venstreparti)	6
Liberal Party (Venstre)	2
Joint list of the Green Party and Kristiansand city and environmental protection list (Miljøpartiet De Grønne/Kristiansand By og Miljøvernliste)	2
Total number of members:	77

Kristiansand bystyre 1987–1991
Party name (in Norwegian)	Number of representatives
Labour Party (Arbeiderpartiet)	15
Progress Party (Fremskrittspartiet)	10
Conservative Party (Høyre)	17
Christian Democratic Party (Kristelig Folkeparti)	12
Pensioners' Party (Pensjonistpartiet)	6
Centre Party (Senterpartiet)	1
Socialist Left Party (Sosialistisk Venstreparti)	2
Liberal Party (Venstre)	8
Kristiansand city and environmental protection list (Kristiansand By og Miljøvernliste)	6
Total number of members:	77

Kristiansand bystyre 1983–1987
Party name (in Norwegian)	Number of representatives
Labour Party (Arbeiderpartiet)	22
Progress Party (Fremskrittspartiet)	5
Conservative Party (Høyre)	25
Christian Democratic Party (Kristelig Folkeparti)	15
Centre Party (Senterpartiet)	2
Socialist Left Party (Sosialistisk Venstreparti)	2
Liberal Party (Venstre)	4
Kristiansand city and environmental protection list (Kristiansand By og Miljøvernliste)	2
Total number of members:	77

Kristiansand bystyre 1979–1983
Party name (in Norwegian)	Number of representatives
Labour Party (Arbeiderpartiet)	18
Progress Party (Fremskrittspartiet)	1
Conservative Party (Høyre)	27
Christian Democratic Party (Kristelig Folkeparti)	16
New People's Party (Nye Folkepartiet)	1
Centre Party (Senterpartiet)	3
Socialist Left Party (Sosialistisk Venstreparti)	2
Liberal Party (Venstre)	5
Kristiansand city and environmental protection list (Kristiansand By og Miljøvernliste)	4
Total number of members:	77

Kristiansand bystyre 1975–1979
Party name (in Norwegian)	Number of representatives
Labour Party (Arbeiderpartiet)	20
Anders Lange's Party (Anders Langes parti)	2
Conservative Party (Høyre)	19
Christian Democratic Party (Kristelig Folkeparti)	20
New People's Party (Nye Folkepartiet)	5
Centre Party (Senterpartiet)	2
Socialist Left Party (Sosialistisk Venstreparti)	3
Liberal Party (Venstre)	6
Total number of members:	77

Kristiansand bystyre 1971–1975
Party name (in Norwegian)	Number of representatives
Labour Party (Arbeiderpartiet)	24
Conservative Party (Høyre)	13
Christian Democratic Party (Kristelig Folkeparti)	13
Centre Party (Senterpartiet)	4
Socialist People's Party (Sosialistisk Folkeparti)	5
Liberal Party (Venstre)	18
Total number of members:	77

Kristiansand bystyre 1967–1971
Party name (in Norwegian)	Number of representatives
Labour Party (Arbeiderpartiet)	26
Conservative Party (Høyre)	14
Christian Democratic Party (Kristelig Folkeparti)	9
Centre Party (Senterpartiet)	3
Socialist People's Party (Sosialistisk Folkeparti)	2
Liberal Party (Venstre)	23
Total number of members:	77

Kristiansand bystyre 1963–1967
Party name (in Norwegian)	Number of representatives
Labour Party (Arbeiderpartiet)	25
Conservative Party (Høyre)	11
Christian Democratic Party (Kristelig Folkeparti)	6
Socialist People's Party (Sosialistisk Folkeparti)	1
Liberal Party (Venstre)	18
Total number of members:	61

Kristiansand bystyre 1959–1963
Party name (in Norwegian)	Number of representatives
Labour Party (Arbeiderpartiet)	23
Conservative Party (Høyre)	10
Communist Party (Kommunistiske Parti)	1
Christian Democratic Party (Kristelig Folkeparti)	6
Centre Party (Senterpartiet)	1
Liberal Party (Venstre)	20
Total number of members:	61

Kristiansand bystyre 1955–1959
Party name (in Norwegian)	Number of representatives
Labour Party (Arbeiderpartiet)	24
Conservative Party (Høyre)	11
Communist Party (Kommunistiske Parti)	1
Christian Democratic Party (Kristelig Folkeparti)	6
Liberal Party (Venstre)	19
Total number of members:	61

Kristiansand bystyre 1951–1955
Party name (in Norwegian)	Number of representatives
Labour Party (Arbeiderpartiet)	23
Conservative Party (Høyre)	10
Communist Party (Kommunistiske Parti)	2
Christian Democratic Party (Kristelig Folkeparti)	4
Liberal Party (Venstre)	18
Local List(s) (Lokale lister)	3
Total number of members:	60

Kristiansand bystyre 1947–1951
Party name (in Norwegian)	Number of representatives
Labour Party (Arbeiderpartiet)	21
Conservative Party (Høyre)	11
Communist Party (Kommunistiske Parti)	3
Christian Democratic Party (Kristelig Folkeparti)	5
Liberal Party (Venstre)	14
Local List(s) (Lokale lister)	6
Total number of members:	60

Kristiansand bystyre 1945–1947
Party name (in Norwegian)	Number of representatives
Labour Party (Arbeiderpartiet)	24
Conservative Party (Høyre)	9
Communist Party (Kommunistiske Parti)	3
Liberal Party (Venstre)	13
Local List(s) (Lokale lister)	11
Total number of members:	60

Kristiansand bystyre 1937–1941*
Party name (in Norwegian)	Number of representatives
Labour Party (Arbeiderpartiet)	20
Temperance Party (Avholdspartiet)	10
Conservative Party (Høyre)	10
Liberal Party (Venstre)	20
Total number of members:	60
Note: Due to the German occupation of Norway during World War II, no elections were held for new municipal councils until after the war ended in 1945.

Kristiansand bystyre 1934–1937
Party name (in Norwegian)	Number of representatives
Labour Party (Arbeiderpartiet)	19
Temperance Party (Avholdspartiet)	9
Conservative Party (Høyre)	11
Liberal Party (Venstre)	21
Total number of members:	60

Kristiansand bystyre 1931–1934
Party name (in Norwegian)	Number of representatives
Labour Party (Arbeiderpartiet)	18
Temperance Party (Avholdspartiet)	11
Liberal Party (Venstre)	18
Joint list of the Conservative Party (Høyre) and the Free-minded People's Party (Frisinnede Folkeparti)	13
Total number of members:	60

Kristiansand bystyre 1928–1931
Party name (in Norwegian)	Number of representatives
Labour Party (Arbeiderpartiet)	21
Temperance Party (Avholdspartiet)	12
Conservative Party (Høyre)	17
Liberal Party (Venstre)	10
Total number of members:	60

Kristiansand bystyre 1925–1928
Party name (in Norwegian)	Number of representatives
Labour Party (Arbeiderpartiet)	12
Temperance Party (Avholdspartiet)	12
Social Democratic Labour Party (Socialdemokratiske Arbeiderparti)	7
Liberal Party (Venstre)	9
Joint list of the Conservative Party (Høyre) and the Free-minded Liberal Party (Frisinnede Venstre)	20
Total number of members:	60

Kristiansand bystyre 1922–1925
Party name (in Norwegian)	Number of representatives
Labour Party (Arbeiderpartiet)	14
Temperance Party (Avholdspartiet)	11
Social Democratic Labour Party (Socialdemokratiske Arbeiderparti)	4
Liberal Party (Venstre)	11
Joint list of the Conservative Party (Høyre) and the Free-minded Liberal Party (Frisinnede Venstre)	20
Total number of members:	60

Kristiansand bystyre 1919–1922
Party name (in Norwegian)	Number of representatives
Labour Party (Arbeiderpartiet)	14
Temperance Party (Avholdspartiet)	17
Liberal Party (Venstre)	11
Joint list of the Conservative Party (Høyre) and the Free-minded Liberal Party (Frisinnede Venstre)	18
Total number of members:	60

=== Mayors ===
The mayor (Norwegian: ordfører) of Kristiansand Municipality is the political leader of the municipality and the chairperson of the municipal council. The following people have held this position:

- 1838–1838: Jacob von der Lippe
- 1838–1839: Mathias Andreas Boye
- 1840–1840: Jacob von der Lippe
- 1841–1843: Isaach Willoch
- 1844–1844: Jacob Andreas Falch
- 1845–1845: Paul Brodahl Lassen
- 1846–1846: Anton Carl Hartmann
- 1847–1847: Niels Wisløw Rogstad
- 1848–1848: Anton Carl Hartmann
- 1849–1849: Anthon Wilhelm Manthey
- 1850–1851: Jens Nicolai Heyerdahl
- 1851–1853: Oluf Steen Julius Berner
- 1854–1854: Michael Rolfsen
- 1855–1855: Niels Wisløw Rogstad
- 1856–1856: Anton Carl Hartmann
- 1857–1857: Michael Rolfsen
- 1858–1858: Niels Wisløw Rogstad
- 1859–1860: Hans Maartmann Fleischer
- 1861–1862: Claus Christian Olroy
- 1863–1863: Hans Maartmann Fleischer
- 1864–1864: Claus Christian Olroy
- 1865–1865: Hans Maartmann Fleischer
- 1866–1866: Michael Rolfsen
- 1867–1868: Einar Tambeskjælver Rosenqvist
- 1869–1873: Hans Maartmann Fleischer
- 1874–1874: Peder Ferdinand Reinhardt
- 1875–1875: Hans Maartmann Fleischer
- 1876–1876: Peter Lorentz Stabel
- 1877–1879: Hans Maartmann Fleischer
- 1880–1892: Peter Lorentz Stabel
- 1892–1894: Arne Vogt
- 1895–1904: Carl Arnesen (V)
- 1905–1907: E.A. Gundersen (V)
- 1908–1910: Mathias Hansen (H)
- 1911–1911: Bernt Reinhardt (H)
- 1912–1912: Christian Reinhardt Bergsland (H)
- 1913–1913: Henrik J. Tellefsen (AvH)
- 1914–1919: Einar Jørgensen (V)
- 1920–1922: Nicolay Eckhoff (H)
- 1923–1924: Carl Christiansen (H)
- 1925–1925: Bernt Reinhardt (H)
- 1926–1926: Nicolay Eckhoff (H)
- 1927–1928: William Dahl-Hansen (H)
- 1929–1931: Johan Øydegard (Ap)
- 1932–1937: Einar Jørgensen (V)
- 1938–1940: Rudolf Peersen (V)
- 1941–1945: O.A. Fosby (NS)
- 1945–1945: Rudolf Peersen (V)
- 1946–1947: Karl Rosenløv (Ap)
- 1948–1952: Aage Grønningsæter (V)
- 1953–1955: Johannes Seland (V)
- 1956–1963: Leo Tallaksen (V)
- 1964–1965: Alfred Netland (V)
- 1966–1971: Leo Tallaksen (V)
- 1972–1975: Einar Hansen (V)
- 1976–1977: Harald Synnes (KrF)
- 1978–1991: Paul Otto Johnsen (H)
- 1991–2003: Bjørg Wallevik (H)
- 2003–2007: Jan Oddvar Skisland (KrF)
- 2007–2011: Per Sigurd Sørensen (H)
- 2011–2015: Arvid Grundekjøn (H)
- 2015–2019: Harald Furre (H)
- 2019–2023: Jan Oddvar Skisland (Ap)
- 2023–present: Mathias Bernander (H)

== Twin towns – sister cities ==
Kristiansand is twinned with:

- Gdynia, Poland
- Kerava, Finland
- Letchworth, England, United Kingdom
- Münster, Germany
- Orléans, France
- Rajshahi, Bangladesh
- Reykjanesbær, Iceland
- Trollhättan, Sweden
- Walvis Bay, Namibia
