= Anton Carl Hartmann =

Norwegian politician

Anton Carl Hartmann (6 March 1803 – 1 September 1860) was a Norwegian politician of German descent.

Hartmann was born in Jülich-Cleves-Berg, Prussia, to Heinrick Carl Hartmann and Helene Dorothea Posfelt. In 1826, he married Dorothea Smit in Kristiansand.

He was elected to the Norwegian Parliament in 1854 and 1857, representing the constituency of Kristiansand. He worked as a merchant in that city.

He died in 1860, aged 57.
