= Einar Jørgensen =

Norwegian politician

- Born: 12 June 1875; Kristiansand, Norway
- Died: 13 May 1944 (aged 68)
- Occupations: Military officer, teacher and politician
- Known for: Member of the Storting
- Awards: Order of the Dannebrog

Einar Jørgensen (12 June 1875 – 13 May 1944) was a Norwegian military officer, teacher and politician.

== Personal life ==
Jørgensen was born in Kristiansand to Georg Theodor Jørgensen and Karen Margrethe Dahl.

He married Ada Concordia Mønnich in 1903. The couple had six children (2 sons and 4 daughters).

== Career ==
Jørgensen achieved his examen artium academic certification in 1893. He graduated from the upper section of the Norwegian Military Academy in 1896, joining the Kristiansand Brigade with the rank of first lieutenant. He was promoted to the rank of captain in 1900, to major in 1919, and to colonel in 1930. From 1930 to 1935 he was in charge of Agder Infantry Regiment.

He was member of the board of directors of Falconbridge Nikkelverk A/S from 1929.

Jørgensen took part in local politics, and was elected member of the city council of Kristiansand for ten consecutive periods between 1911 and 1940. He served as mayor of Kristiansand from 1914 to 1919, and again from 1932 to 1937.

He was elected representative to the Stortinget for the period 1928–1930, for the Liberal Party. He was decorated Knight of the Danish Order of the Dannebrog.
