= Arvid Grundekjøn =

Norwegian businessman and politician

Arvid Grundekjøn (born 26 June 1955) is a Norwegian businessperson and conservative politician.

He was chairman of Statkraft and awarded in 2009 Chair of the Year for his work, making Statkraft the largest producer of renewable energy in Europe. and Anders Wilhelmsen Group, and is a board member of Royal Caribbean Cruises Ltd. and Dampskibsselskabet Norden.

Grundekjøn is Honorary Consul for Latvia in Norway, and has been awarded with the Order of the Three Stars.

Grundekjøn was the mayor of Kristiansand 2011 - 2015, representing the Conservative Party (Norway).
