= Gimle (Kristiansand) =

- Neighborhood in Kristiansand
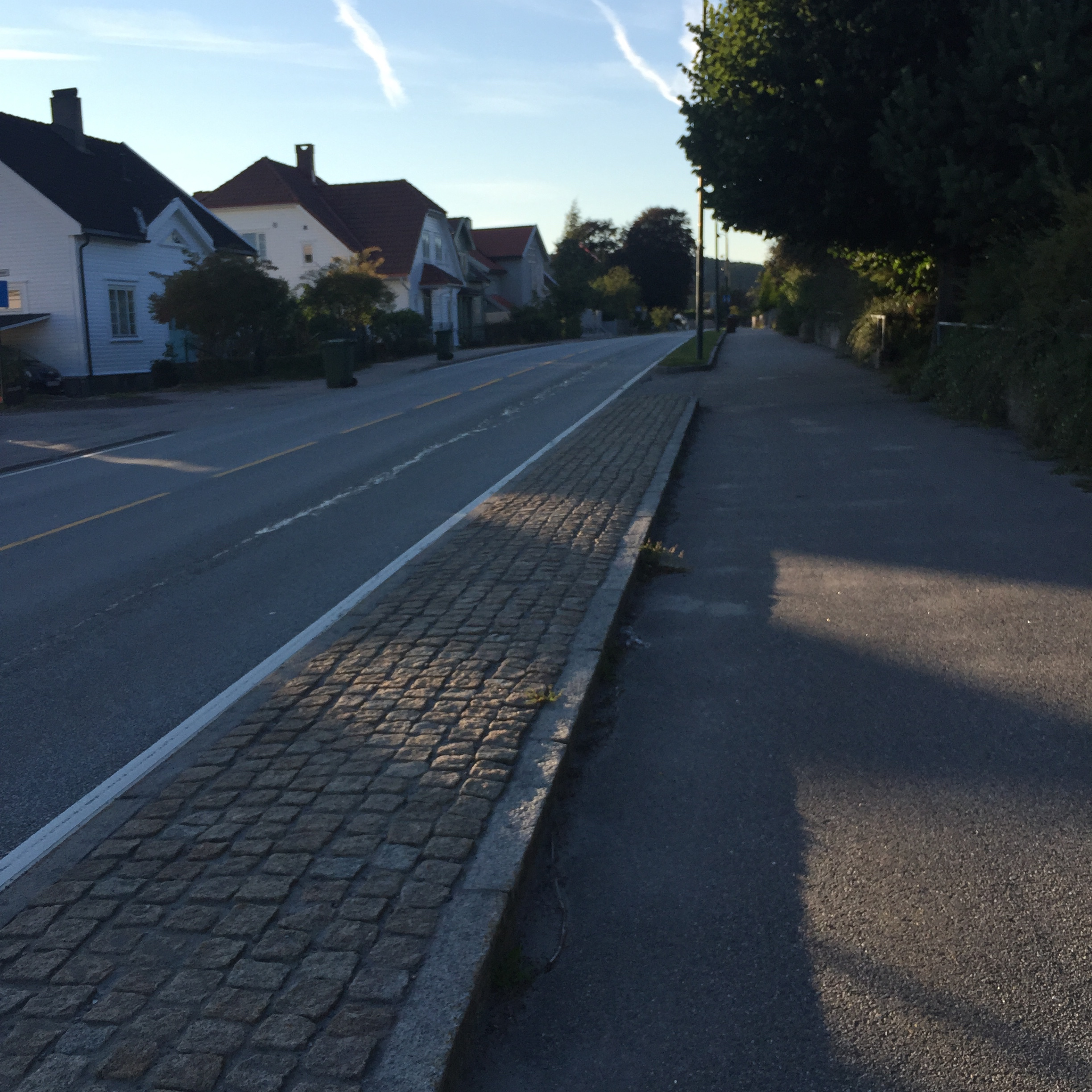
- View of the neighborhood
- Interactive map of Gimle
- Coordinates: 58°09′39″N 08°00′32″E
- Country: Norway
- County: Agder
- Municipality: Kristiansand
- Borough: Lund
- Districts: Gimlekollen and Lund
- Time zone: UTC+01:00 (CET)
  - Summer (DST): UTC+02:00 (CEST)
- Postal code: 4630
- Area code: 38

Gimle is a neighbourhood in the city of Kristiansand in Agder county, Norway. It's located in the borough of Lund. It is located near the neighborhoods of Oddemarka and Presteheia. The neighborhood of Kjøita lies to the southwest and the neighborhood of Marvika lies to the southeast.

The oldest building in Kristiansand, Oddernes Church, as well as the Agder Natural History Museum and Botanical Garden, the Kristiansand campus of the University of Agder, the Kristiansand Cathedral School, the Gimle videregående skole (high school), and the Gimle sports hall are located within the neighborhood of Gimle.

The European Route E18 passes through Gimle, for the most part in a shallow tunnel under the neighbourhood. Gimle was the location for the E18's toll plaza of the Kristiansand Toll Ring until this was removed in 2007. Norwegian County Road 1 follows the Otra River along the western edge of Gimle.

Roads through Gimle
| Line | Destination |
|---|---|
| E18 | Oslo - Kjøita - Kvadraturen |
| Fv471 | Bjørndalssletta - Lund Torv — Kvadraturen |

== Media gallery ==
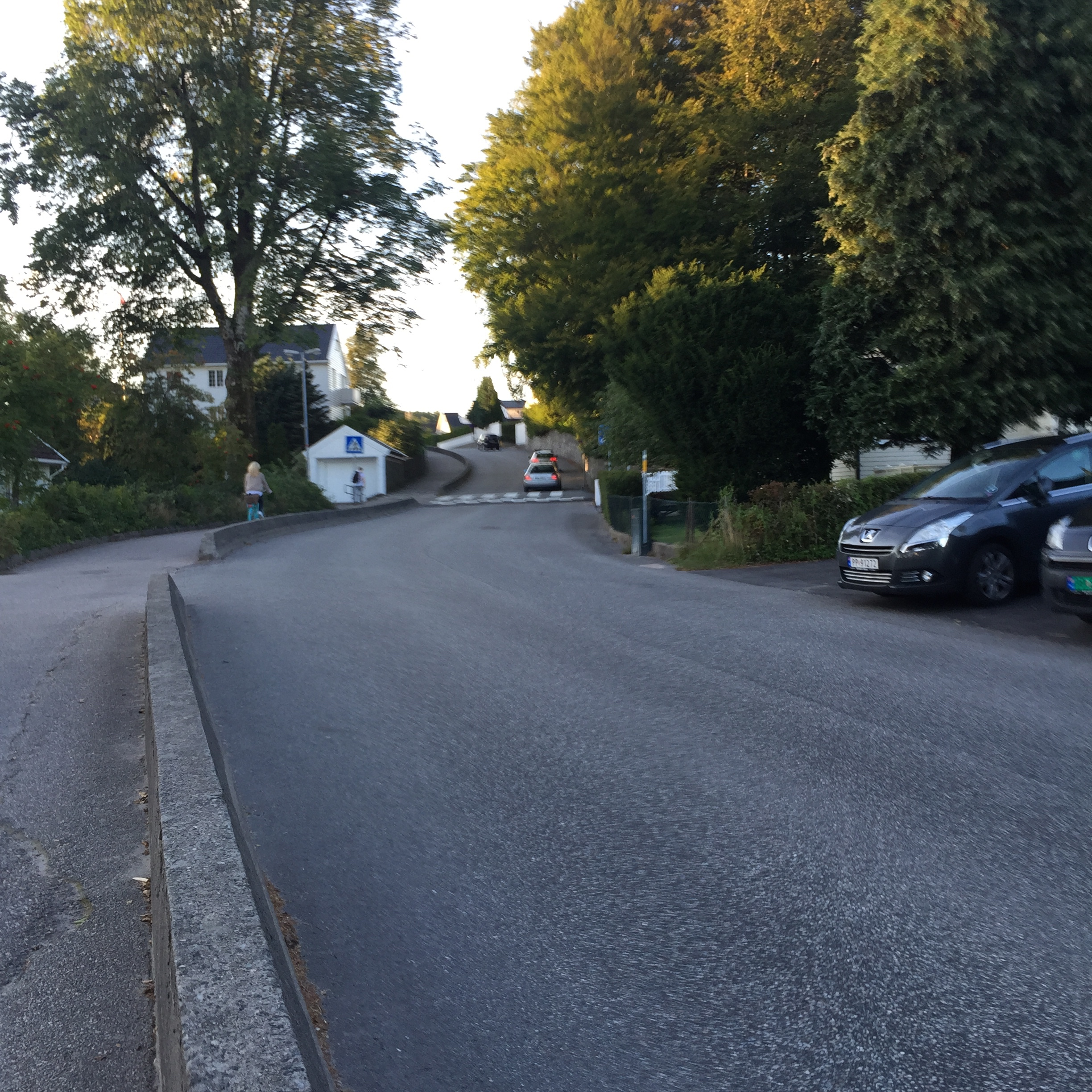
Gimlevang

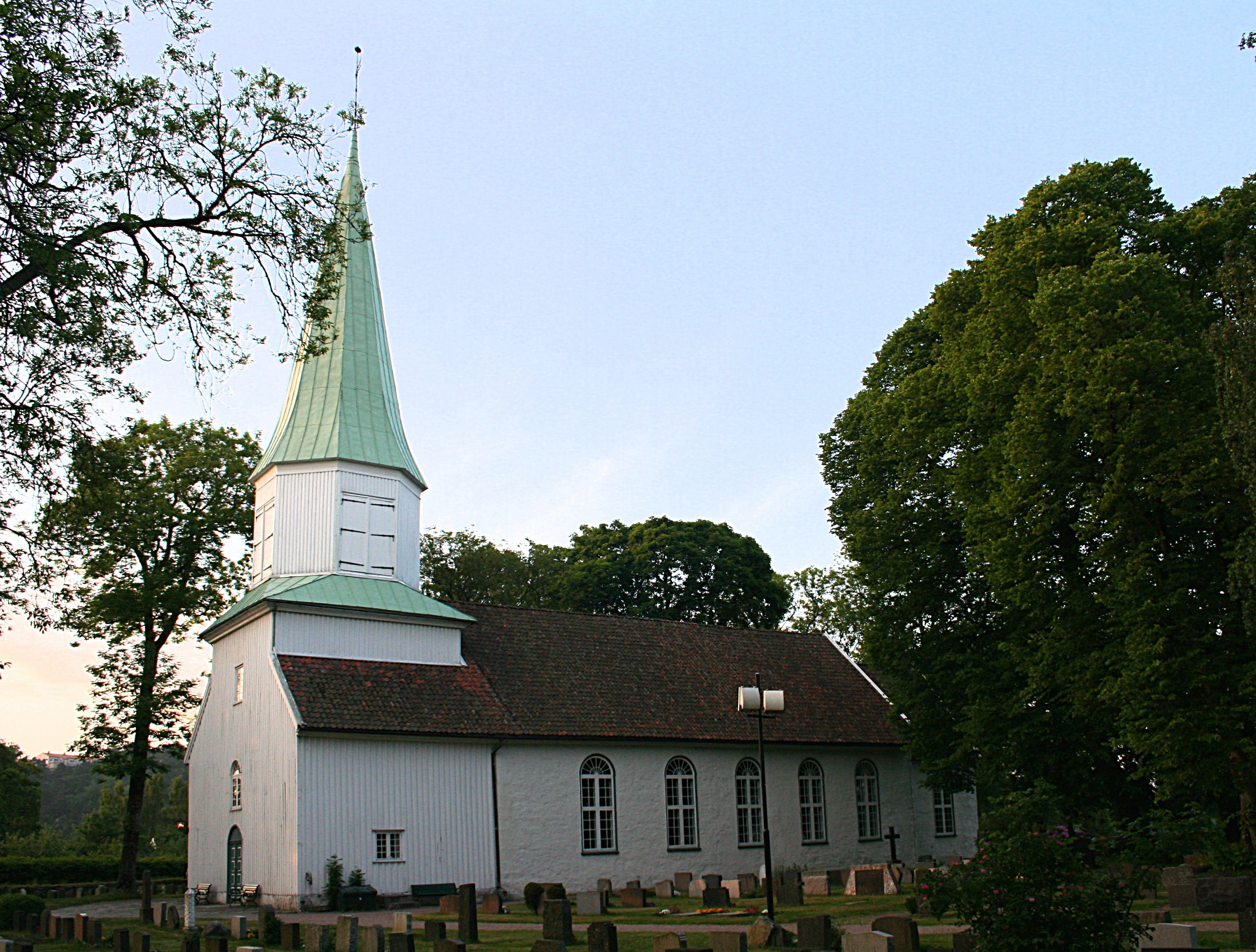
Oddernes Church

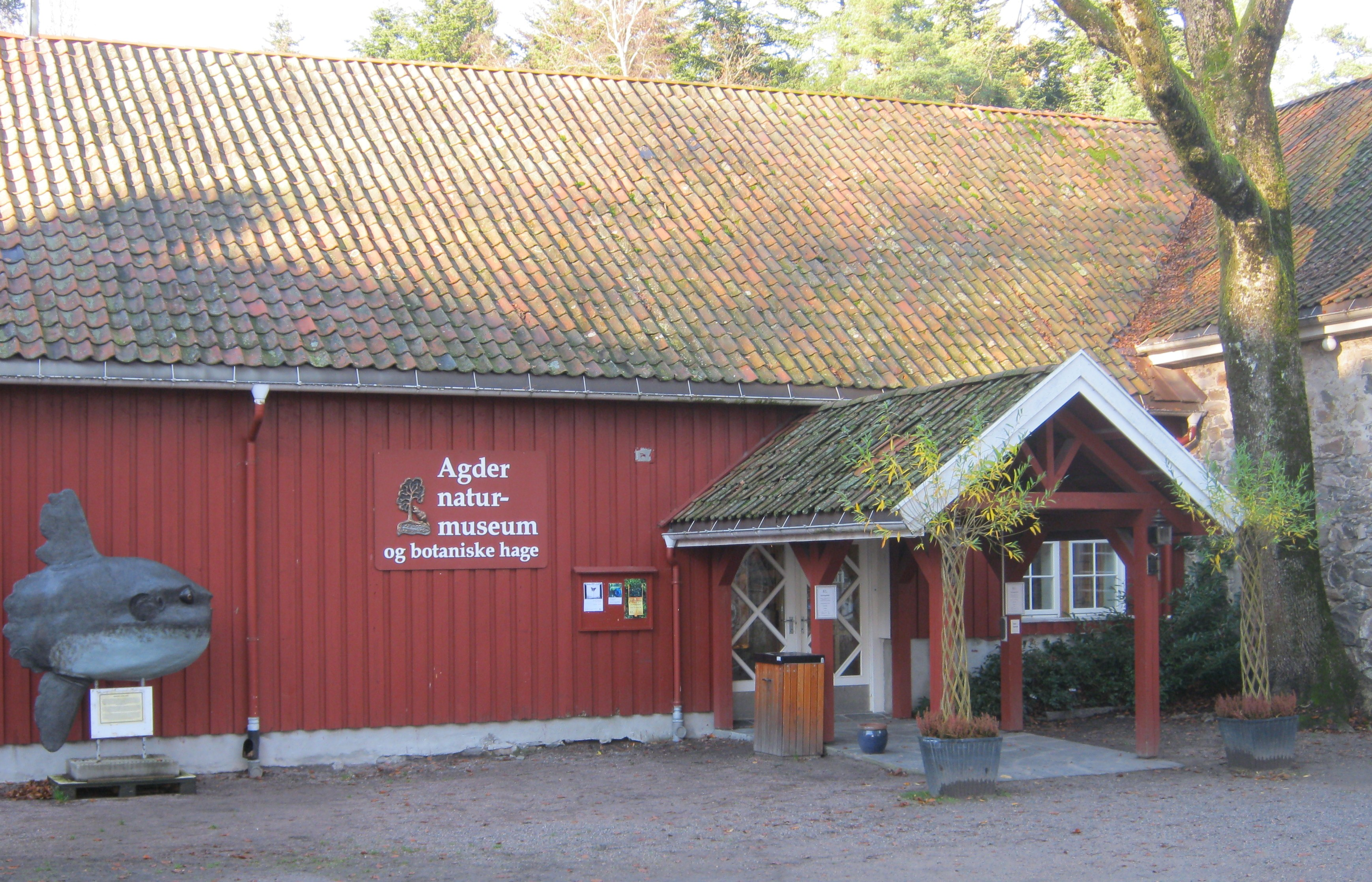
Part of the Agder Nature Museum
