= Bjørndalssletta =

- Neighbourhood in Kristiansand
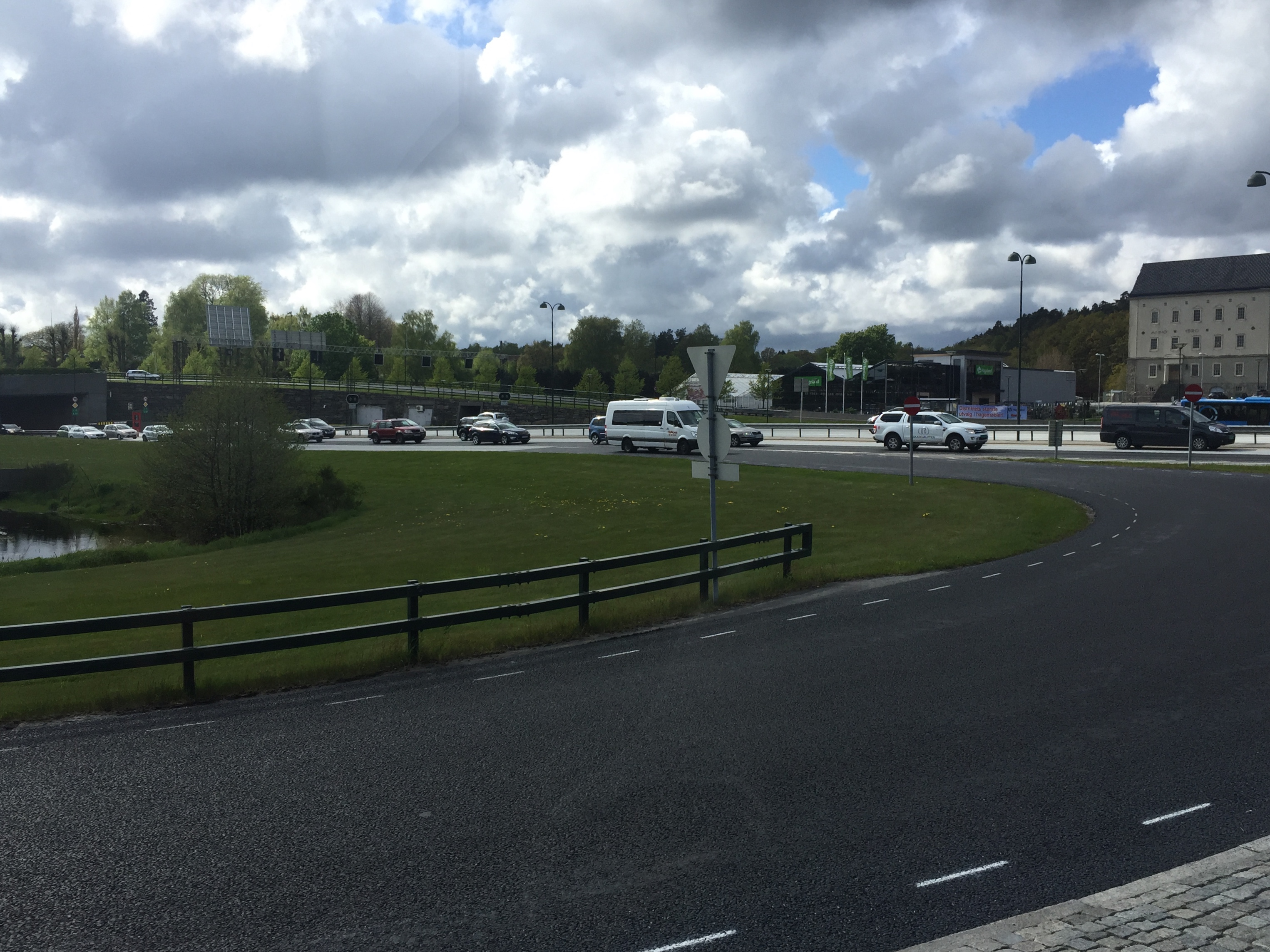
- Interactive map of Bjørndalssletta
- Coordinates: 58°9′44″N 08°1′29″E
- Country: Norway
- County: Agder
- Municipality: Kristiansand
- Borough: Lund
- District: Gimlekollen
- Elevation: 12 m (39 ft)
- Postal code: 4632
- Area code: 38

Bjørndalssletta is a neighborhood in the city of Kristiansand in Agder county, Norway. It is located in the borough of Lund in the district of Gimlekollen. The neighborhood is located next to the European route E18 highway and the lake Vollevannet. There is a large garden store at Bjørndalssletta. The neighborhood of Oddemarka lies to the southwest, the neighborhood of Presteheia lies to the west, Gimle lies to the north, and the Topdalsfjorden lies to the east.

== Transportation ==
=== Road ===
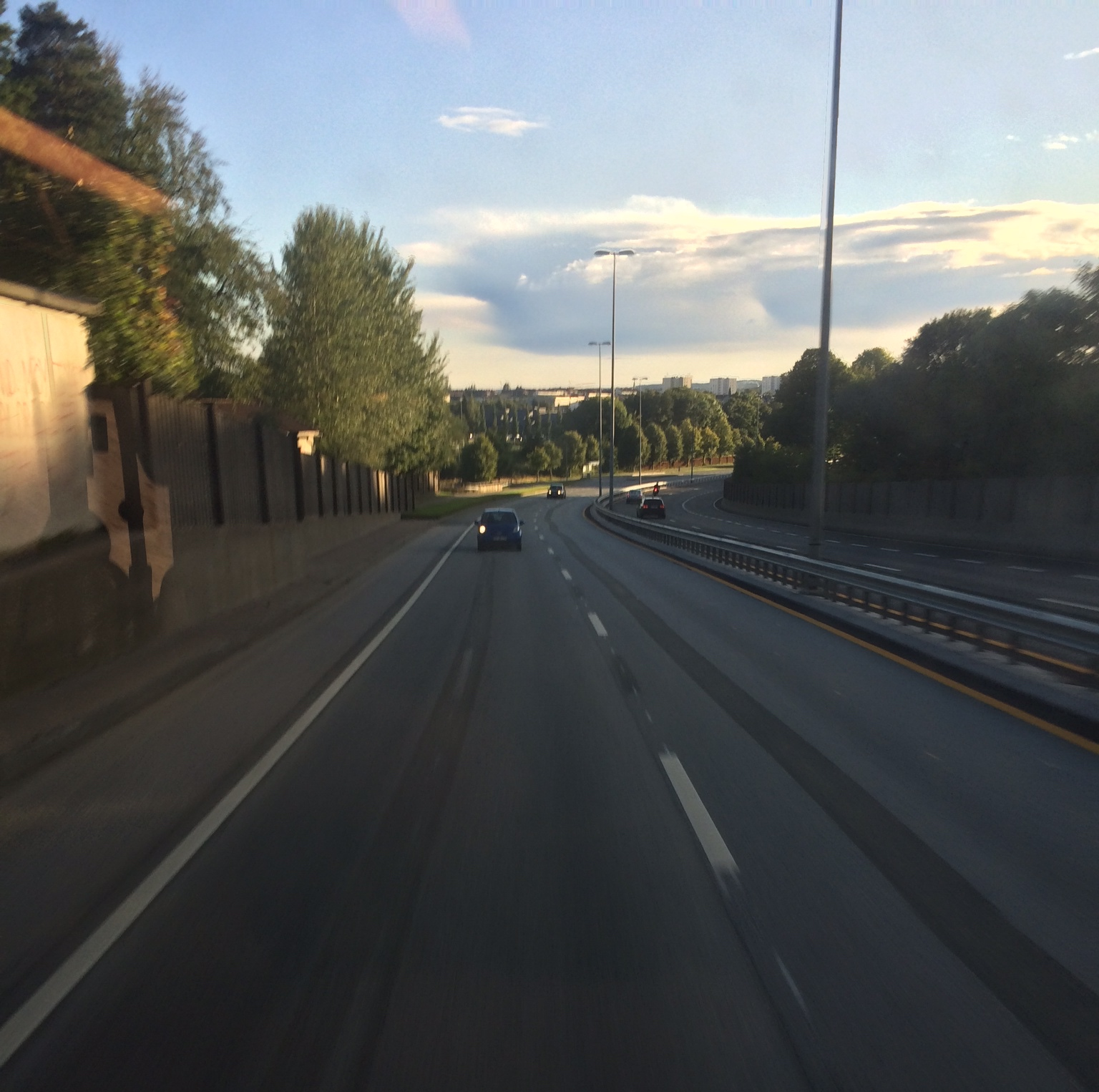
European road 18 at Bjørndalssletta

European route 18 is the main road and is a highway. While other roads like County Road 471 goes from the university to downtown Kristiansand.

List of notable roads in Grim
| Route | Destination |
|---|---|
| E18 | Vige - Bjørndalssletta - Gimle - Downtown |
| Fv471 | Bjørndalssletta - Lund centrum - Downtown |

Local bus lines who uses E18 goes through Bjørndalssletta. Other long-distance routes to Oslo and Stavanger stops only at Bjørndalssletta in Lund before continuing.

=== Bus ===
Bus transportation from/through Bjørndalssletta
| Line | Destination |
|---|---|
| 01 | Kvadraturen - Sørlandsparken |
| M1 | Flekkerøy - Sørlandsparken Dyreparken-IKEA |
| M2 | Voiebyen - Hånes (-Lauvåsen) |
| M2 | Voiebyen - Hånes - Kjevik/Tveit |
| M3 | Slettheia - Søm |
| A2 | Kvadraturen - Hånes |
| A3 | Kvadraturen - Søm |
| 17 | Hellemyr - Tømmerstø |
| 17 | Hellemyr - Tømmerstø-Frikstad |
| 18 | Hellemyr - Tømmerstø Odderhei-Holte |
| 18 | Hellemyr - Dvergsnes |
| 23 | Kvadraturen - Vollevannet - Jærnesheia |
| 23 | Kvadraturen - Vollevannet - Ålefjær |
| 35 | Kristiansand - Kjevik-Brattvollshei |
| 35 | Kristiansand - Kjevik-Brattvollshei / Grødum |
| 36 | Kristiansand - Tveit-Grødum |
| 37 | Kristiansand - Birkeland |
| 100 | Kristiansand - Arendal |
| 139 | Kristiansand Høvåg (-Lillesand) |
| 190 | Kristiansand - Oslo |
| 192 | Kristiansand - Oslo |
| 192 | Stavanger - Kristiansand - Oslo |
| 900 | Mandal-Lista - Kristiansand Airport, Kjevik |
| FLY | Kristiansand - Kristiansand Airport, Kjevik |
| - | - |
| N2 | Flekkerøy-Voiebyen - Hånes |
| N3 | Slettheia - Søm |
| N17 | Kvadraturen - Tømmerstø |
