= John Midgaard =

Norwegian principal and politician

John Midgaard (29 August 1891 – 22 August 1971) was a Norwegian principal and politician for the Liberal Party.

He was born in Oddernes Municipality as a son of Nils Andreas Midgaard (1858–1922) and Anne Marie Hagen (1870–1914). In 1922 he married officer's daughter Anne Sofie Sire.

He finished his secondary education in 1910, graduated from the Royal Frederick University with the cand.philol. degree in 1917 and took the pedagogical examination in 1919.

He was a teacher in Ålesund from 1917, Nordstrand from 1925 and Oslo Cathedral School from 1937. In 1946 he became principal of Vahl in Oslo. In 1936 he also took the dr.philos. degree with the doctoral thesis Fra Madrid til Tanger, and he later wrote school textbooks in history and English.

In 1948 he was elected to the executive committee of Oslo city council, and also became chairman of Oslo Liberal Party. He was a minor ballot candidate in the 1953 and 1957 parliamentary elections. He died in August 1971.
