= Ålefjær =

District Ålefjær
- Village and District
- Coat of arms

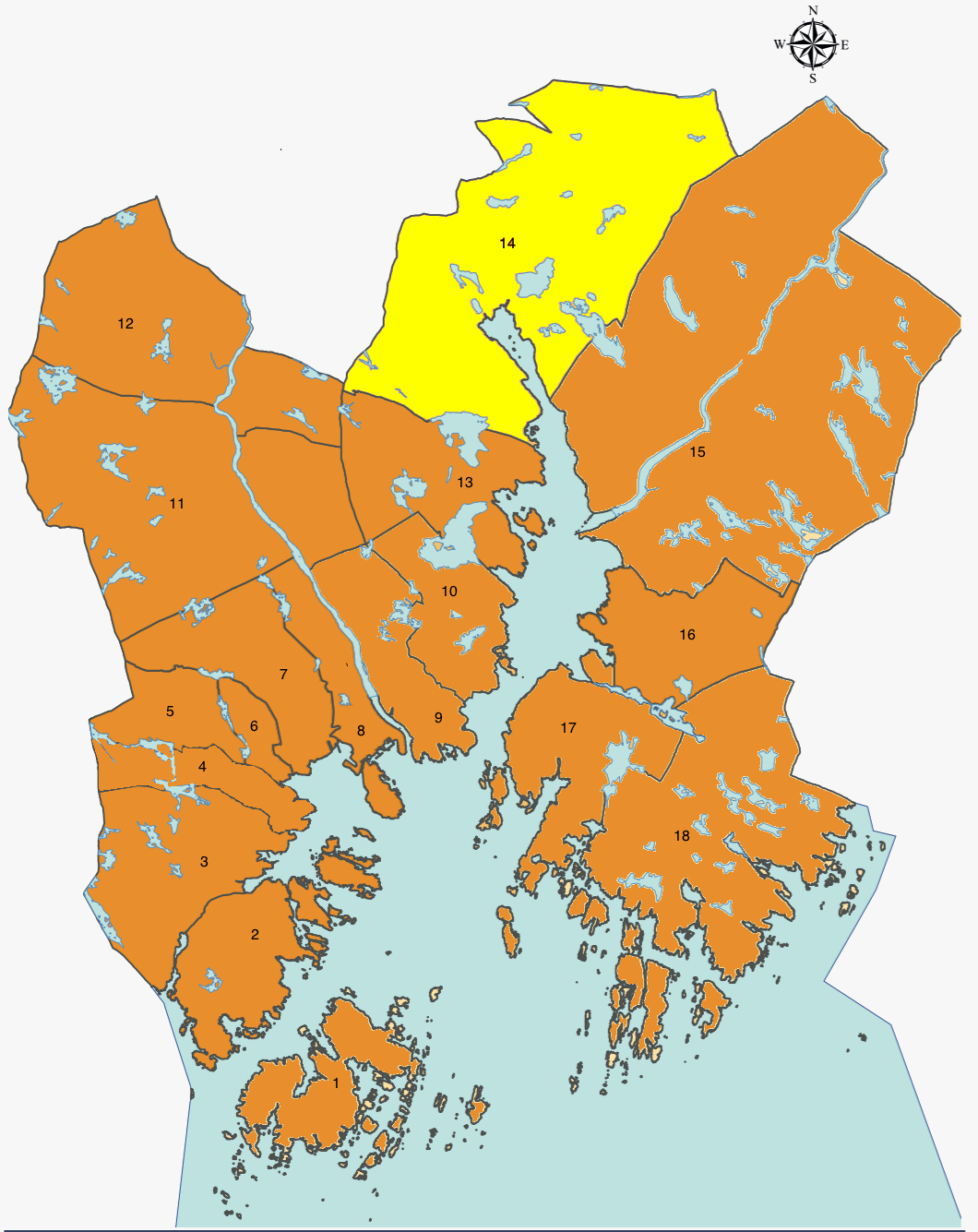
- Map of Kristiansand with Ålefjær district highlighted in yellow
- Coordinates: 58.2374°N 08.0351°E
- Country: Norway
- Region: Southern Norway
- County: Agder
- Municipality: Kristiansand Municipality
- Borough: Lund
- Elevation: 13 m (43 ft)

Population (2014)
  - Total: 410
- Time zone: UTC+01:00 (CET)
  - Summer (DST): UTC+02:00 (CEST)
- ISO 3166 code: NO-030112
- Website: kristiansand.kommune.no

Ålefjær is a village and district in Kristiansand Municipality in Agder county, Norway. The village and district lies in the far northern part of the municipality within the borough of Lund. The population of the district in 2014 was 410. Ålefjær borders the district of Tveit to the southeast, the district of Justvik to the southwest, Vennesla Municipality to the northwest, and Birkenes Municipality to the northeast. The village of Ålefjær is situated at the northern end of the Ålefjærfjorden, a branch off the Topdalsfjorden. The district is a very rural area, although it is only about 5 kilometres (3.1 mi) southeast of the large village of Vennesla and about 10 kilometres (6.2 mi) north of the city of Kristiansand.

== Transportation ==
Bus transportation from/through Ålefjær
Line	Destination
22	Ålefjær - Gimlekollen - Kvadraturen
23	Ålefjær - Vollevannet - Kvadraturen
29	Ålefjær - Justvik
220	Ålefjær - Vennesla

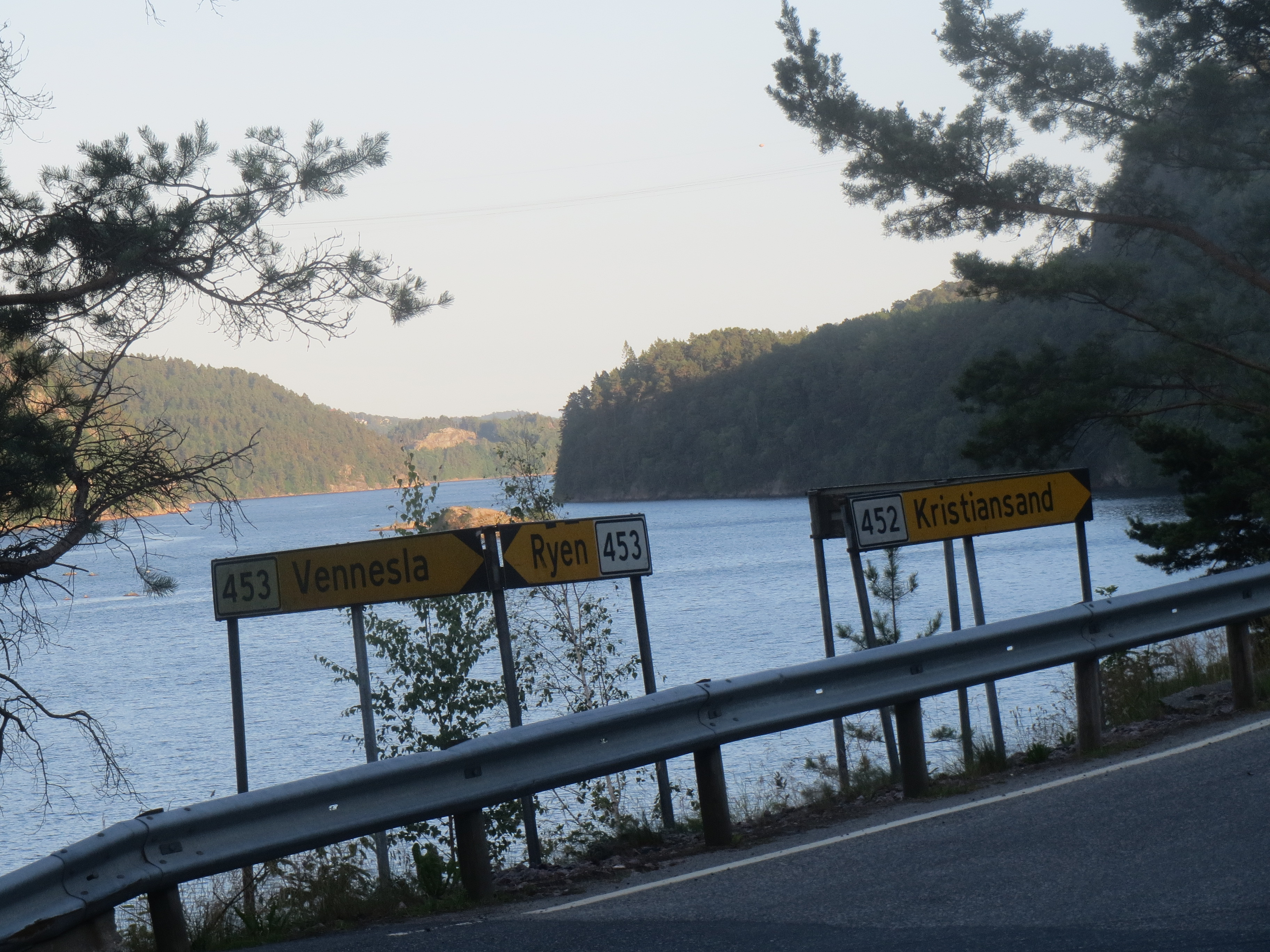
By the road crossing in Ålefjær (County roads 452 and 453)
