= Fjermeros =

Fjermeros is a Norwegian surname. Notable people with the surname include:

- Bue Fjermeros (1912–2000), Norwegian lawyer and politician
- Karl Johan Fjermeros (1885–1972), Norwegian politician
