= Presteheia =

- Neighborhood in Kristiansand
- Interactive map of Presteheia
- Coordinates: 58.1644°N 08.0150°E
- Country: Norway
- County: Agder
- Municipality: Kristiansand
- Borough: Lund
- District: Gimlekollen
- Elevation: 65 m (213 ft)
- Time zone: UTC+01:00 (CET)
  - Summer (DST): UTC+02:00 (CEST)

Presteheia is a neighborhood in the city of Kristiansand (town) which lies in Kristiansand Municipality in Agder county, Norway. It is located in the borough of Lund in the district of Gimlekollen. It is located to the west of Bjørndalssletta, north of Oddemarka, and east of Gimlemoen. The neighborhood developed after the year 2000 has many "rekkehus" and terrace blocks. The residents of the area are both young families and elderly people. The view from Presteheia is magnificent overlooking the borough of Lund, the University of Agder, and the downtown Kvadraturen area. You can see both Oksoy and the island of Odderøya from the top of Presteheia.
