= Justvik =

District Justvik Gjusvik
- Village and District
- Coat of arms

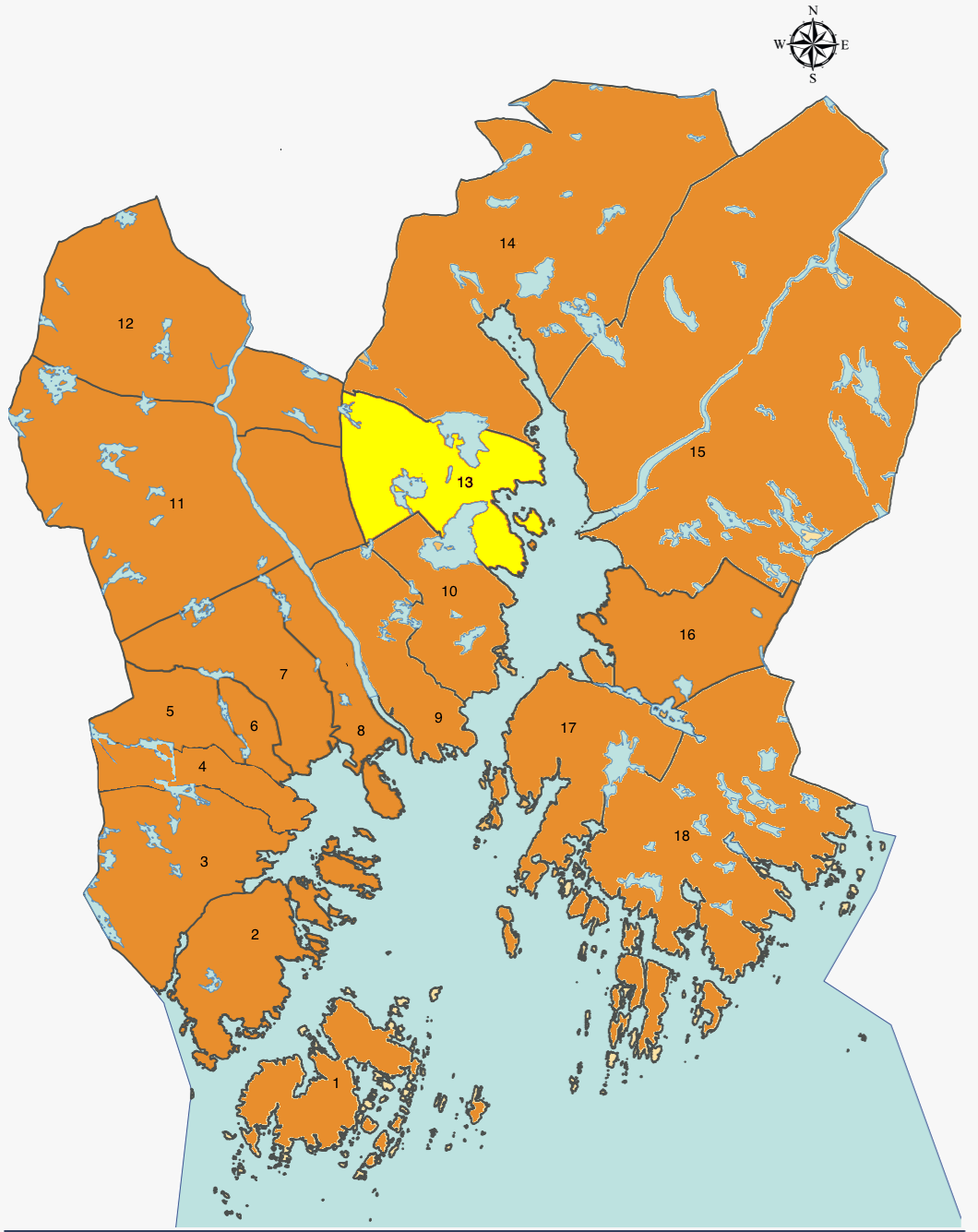
- Map of Kristiansand with Justvik district highlighted in yellow
- Interactive map of District Justvik
- Coordinates: 58.1969°N 08.0311°E
- Country: Norway
- Region: Southern Norway
- County: Vest-Agder
- Municipality: Kristiansand
- Borough: Lund
- Elevation: 5 m (16 ft)

Population (2014)
  - Total: 2,770
- Time zone: UTC+01:00 (CET)
  - Summer (DST): UTC+02:00 (CEST)
- ISO 3166 code: NO-030112
- Website: kristiansand.kommune.no

Justvik is a village and district in Kristiansand Municipality in Agder county, Norway. Its population (as of January 2014) is 2,770. The village of Justvik is located on the west shore of the Topdalsfjorden, just north of the lake Gillsvannet.

Before the large municipal merger with Kristiansand Municipality in 1965, the Justvik area was part of the old Tveit Municipality, while the Justnes and Eidsbukta areas immediately to the south belonged to the old Oddernes Municipality.

Justvik has both older housing and several housing estates which were built during the economic boom from the mid-1960s to the mid-1980s. Within the village is Justvik Church, Justvik School (for elementary and middle school students), sports facilities, and a grocery store.

There are several neighborhoods within the district of Justvik: Bleget, Greppestølåsen, Justneshalvøya, Justvik, Jærnesheia, and Kvernhusheia.

== Politics ==
The 10 largest political parties in Justvik as of the 2015 election:

Kristiansand city council parties	Votes
Labour Party	28,7% (325 votes)
Conservative Party	20,3% (230 votes)
Christian Democratic	17% (193 votes)
Progress Party	11,8% (55 votes)
Green Party	4,9% (55 votes)
Liberal Party	4,8% (54 votes)
The Democrats	4,7% (53 votes)
Socialist Left Party	2,7% (31 votes)
Pensioners'	2,1% (24 votes)
Red	1,1% (13 votes)
Others	2,2% (13 votes)
Total	1046 votes

== Transportation ==
Bus transportation from/through Justvik
Line	Destination
22	Jærnesheia-Gimlekollen - Kvadraturen
22	Ålefjær-Gimlekollen - Kvadraturen
23	Jærnesheia-Vollevannet - Kvadraturen
23	Ålefjær-Vollevannet - Kvadraturen
29	Ålefjær - Justvik
