= Justvik Church =

Church in Agder, Norway

- Justvik kirke
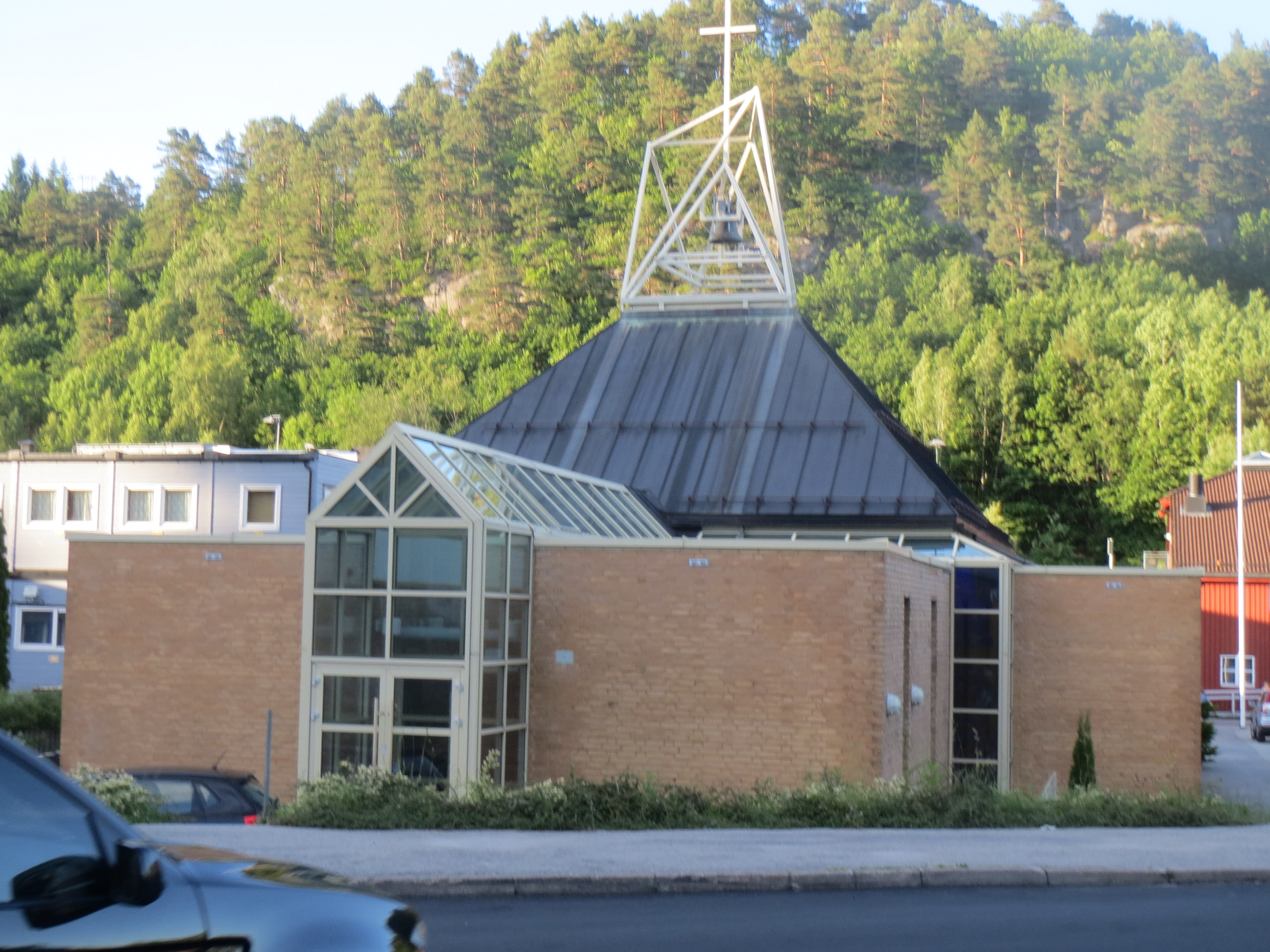
- View of the church
- Justvik Church
- 58.2003°N 08.0323°E
- Location: Kristiansand Municipality, Agder
- Country: Norway
- Denomination: Church of Norway
- Churchmanship: Evangelical Lutheran

History
- Status: Parish church
- Founded: 1996
- Consecrated: 22 Dec 1996

Architecture
- Functional status: Active
- Architect: Ernst Aukland
- Architectural type: Rectangular
- Completed: 1996 (30 years ago)

Specifications
- Capacity: 275
- Materials: Brick

Administration
- Diocese: Agder og Telemark
- Deanery: Kristiansand domprosti
- Parish: Oddernes

Justvik Church (Norwegian: Justvik kirke) is a parish church of the Church of Norway in Kristiansand Municipality in Agder county, Norway. It is located in the village of Justvik, just north of the centre of the city of Kristiansand. It is one of the churches for the Oddernes parish which is part of the Kristiansand domprosti (arch-deanery) in the Diocese of Agder og Telemark. The tan brick church was built in a rectangular design in 1996 using plans drawn up by the architect Ernst Aukland. The church seats about 275 people. The church was consecrated on 29 December 1996 by the Bishop.

== Media gallery ==
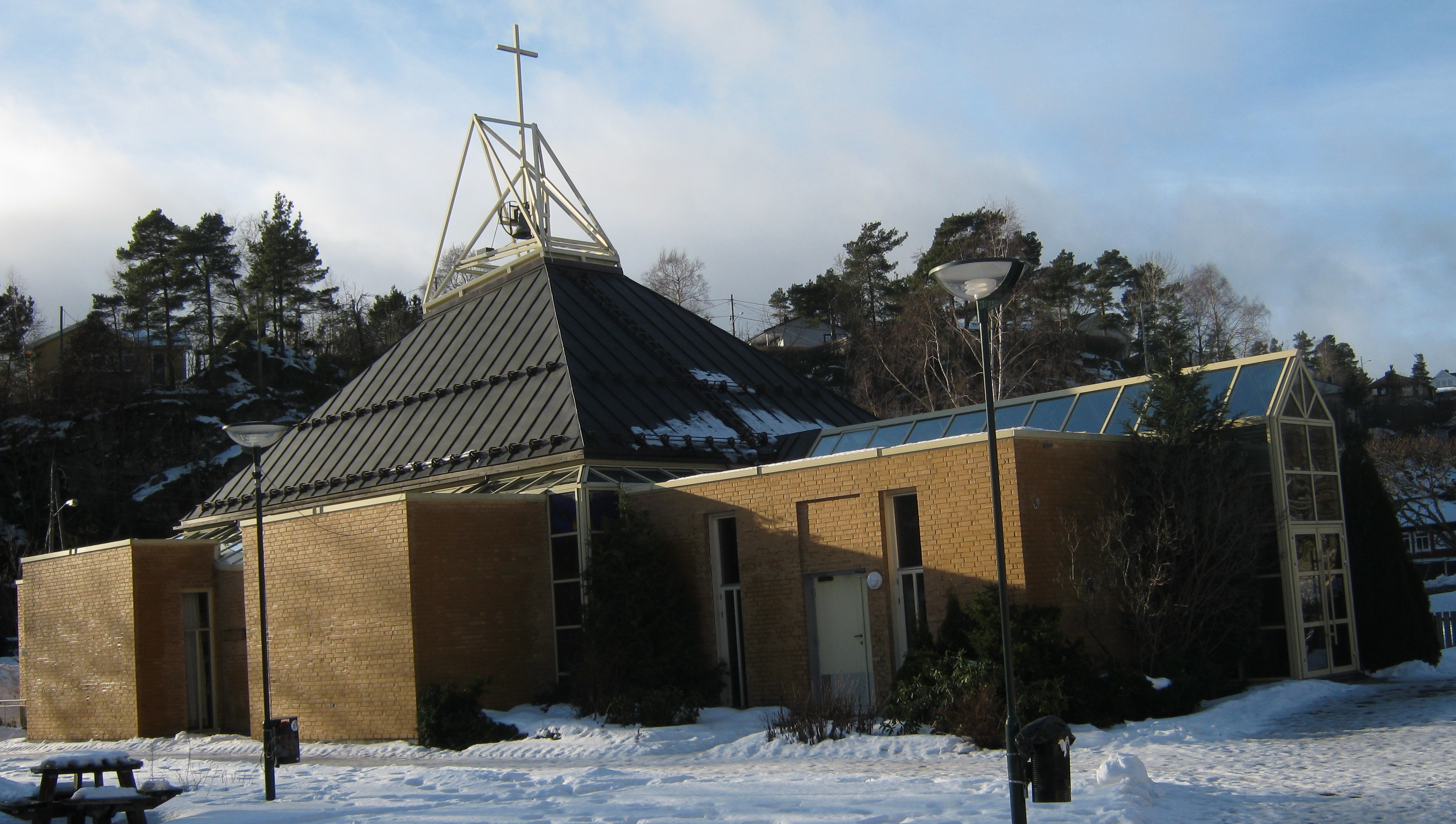

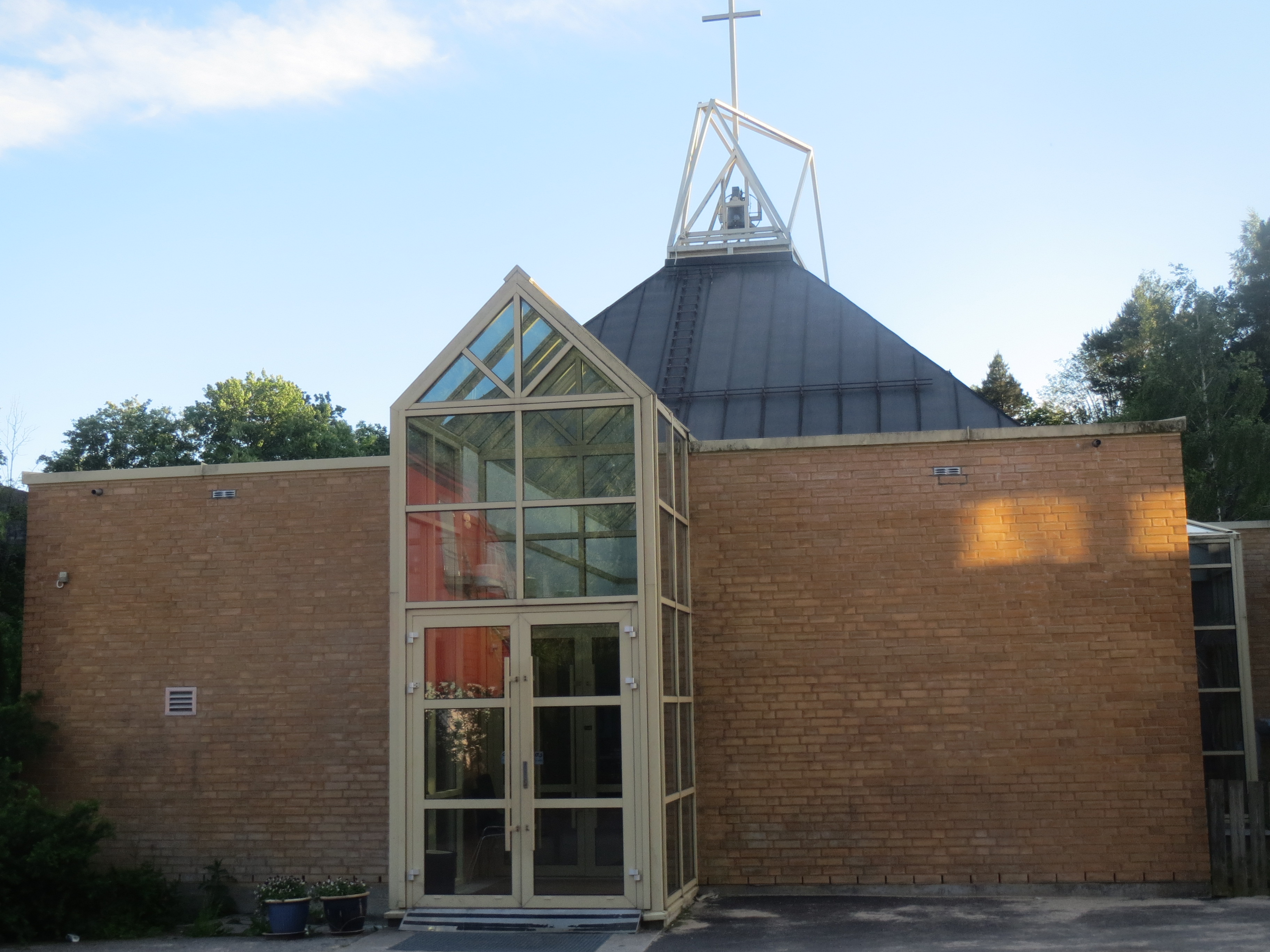

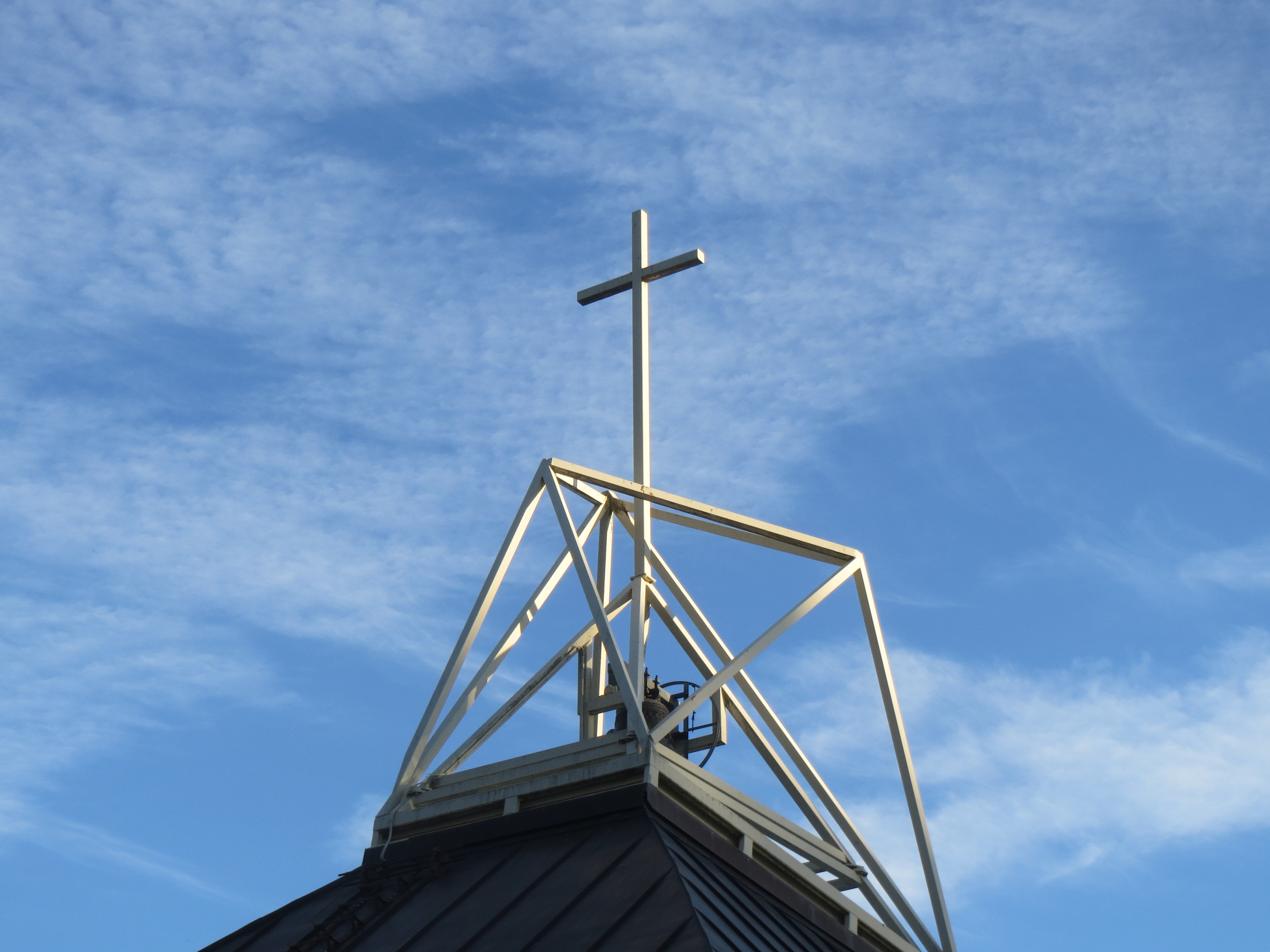

== See also ==
- List of churches in Agder og Telemark
