= Marvika =

Marvika Marvik
- Neighborhood in Kristiansand
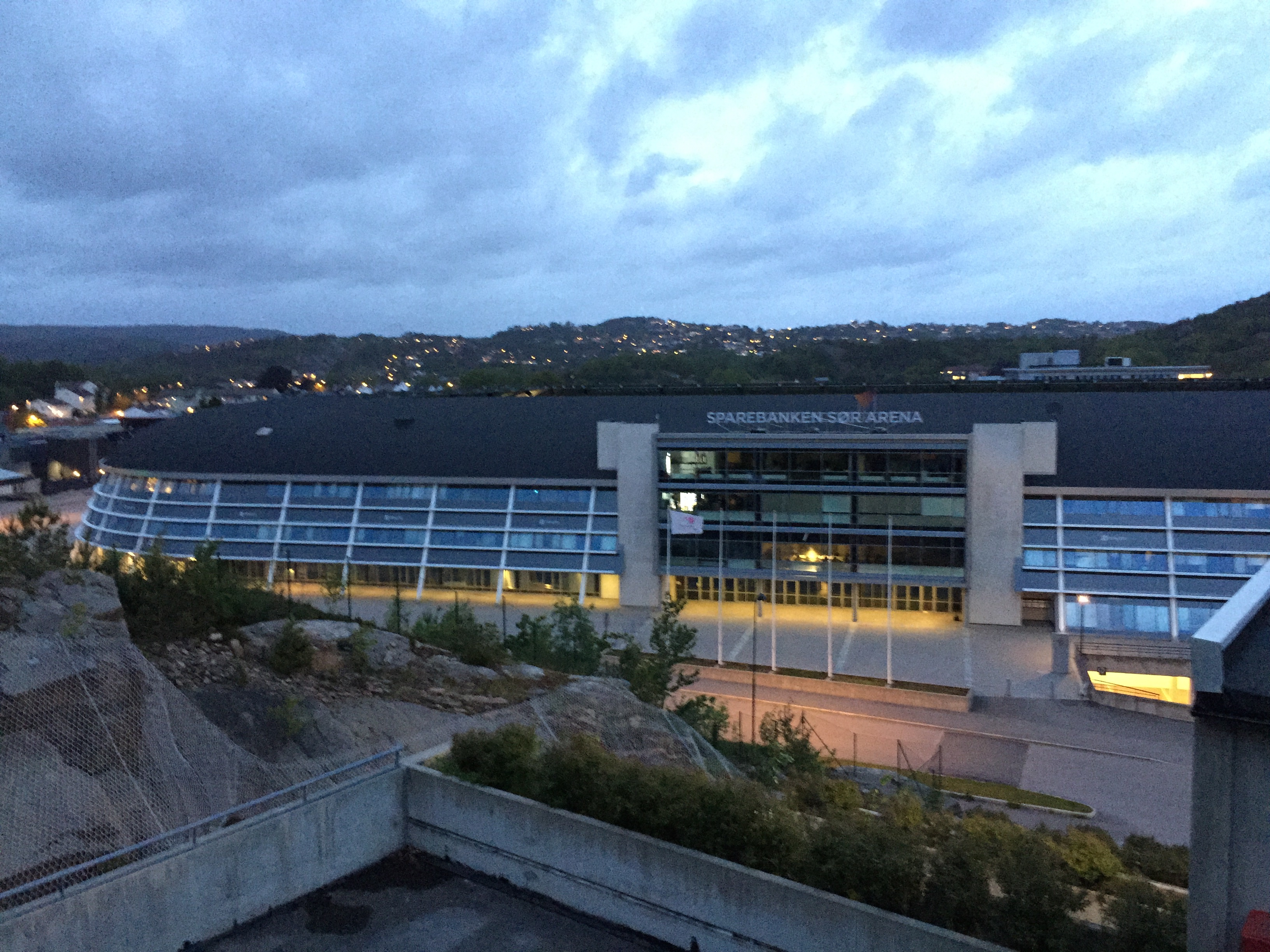
- View of the Sør-Arena in Marvika
- Interactive map of Marvika
- Coordinates: 58.1494°N 08.0310°E
- Country: Norway
- County: Agder
- Municipality: Kristiansand
- Borough: Lund
- District: Gimlekollen
- Elevation: 8 m (26 ft)
- Time zone: UTC+01:00 (CET)
  - Summer (DST): UTC+02:00 (CEST)
- Postal code: 4632
- Area code: 38

Marvika or Marvik is a neighbourhood in the city of Kristiansand in Agder county, Norway. The neighbourhood is located in the southeast part of the borough of Lund and the district of Gimlekollen. The neighborhood of Oddemarka lies to the northwest of Marvika.

Marvika was formerly the site of the Norwegian naval base Marvika orlogsstasjon as well as the Gleodden cannon battery which was subordinate to the nearby Odderøya Fortress.

Sør Arena, the current football stadium for IK Start, is located in the former military area.

The name Marvika comes from the Marviksbukta cove along the Topdalsfjorden, which is a popular place in the summer for residents and tourists. There is also a large shore at Marviksbukta. The possibility of installing summer cooling equipment for the IK Start stadium using cool deep water from the Marviksbukta is being investigated.

There is one elementary school at Marvika, Frank Wild memorial school. Marvika is mostly located with large white houses. There is an industrial park at Marvika serving most of Lund with a range of retail stores and other local services.

The buildings along the port still bear the stamp of the time when it served as a naval base. Marvika Navy Base was closed down on 1 August 2002. However, the buildings today contain offices for different cultural institutions and a base for rescue services.

== Gallery ==
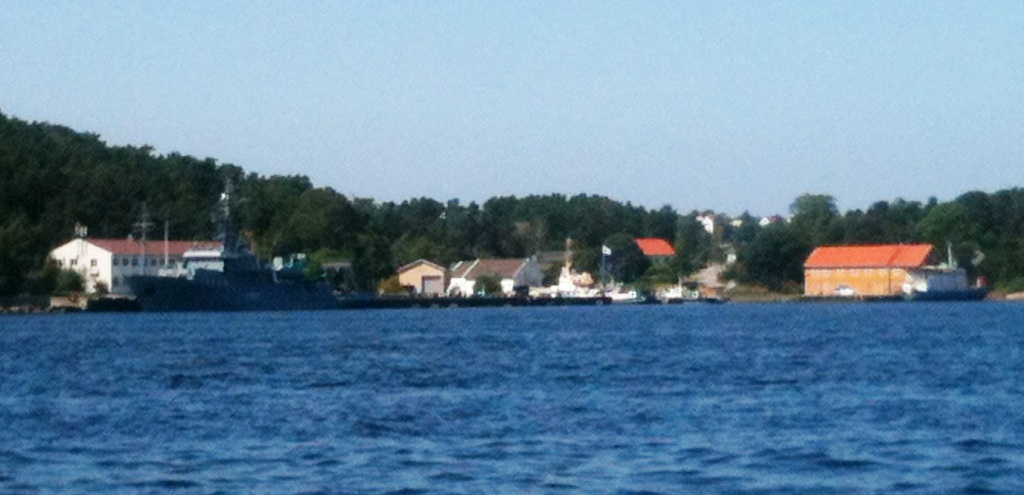
The former naval base

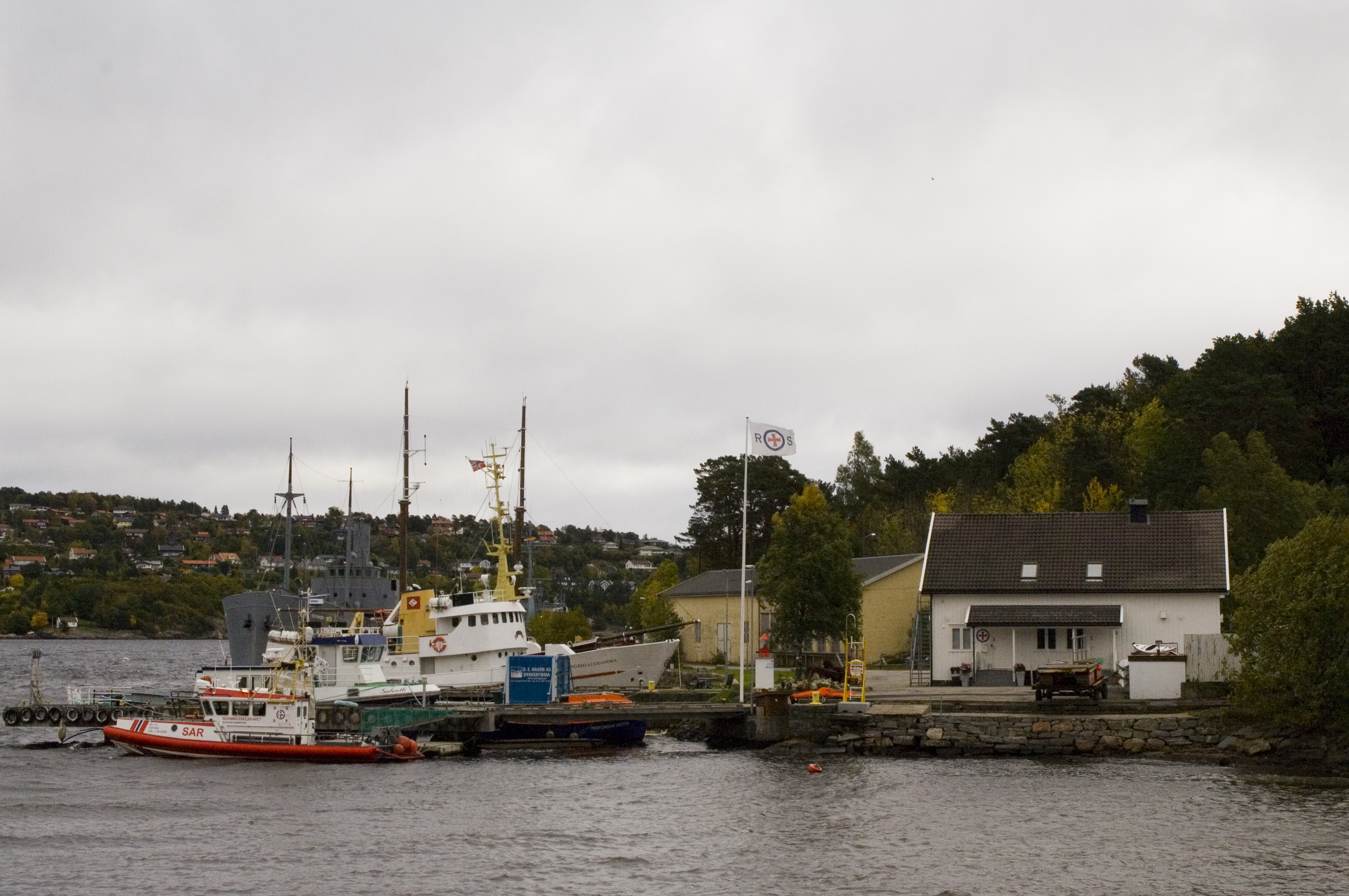
The SAR base of Norsk selskab til skibbrudnes redning

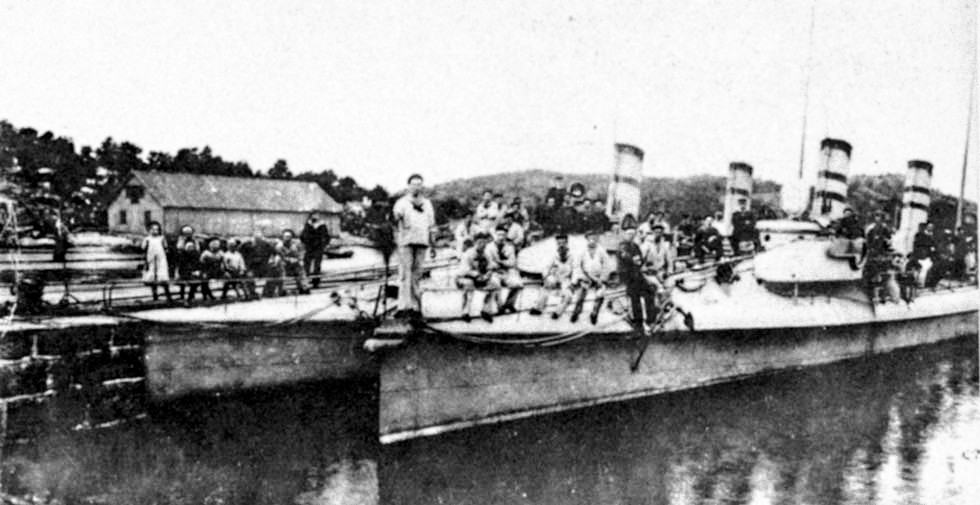
Norwegian naval vessels in the naval base in 1903

== Transport ==
Bus lines through Marvika
Line	Destination
01	Kvadraturen - Sørlandsparken
13	Grimsmyra - Lund
19	Suldalen - Lund-UiA
40	Søgne - Lund
