= Gillsvannet =

Lake in Kristiansand, Norway

- Gillsvann; Gjelsvatnet
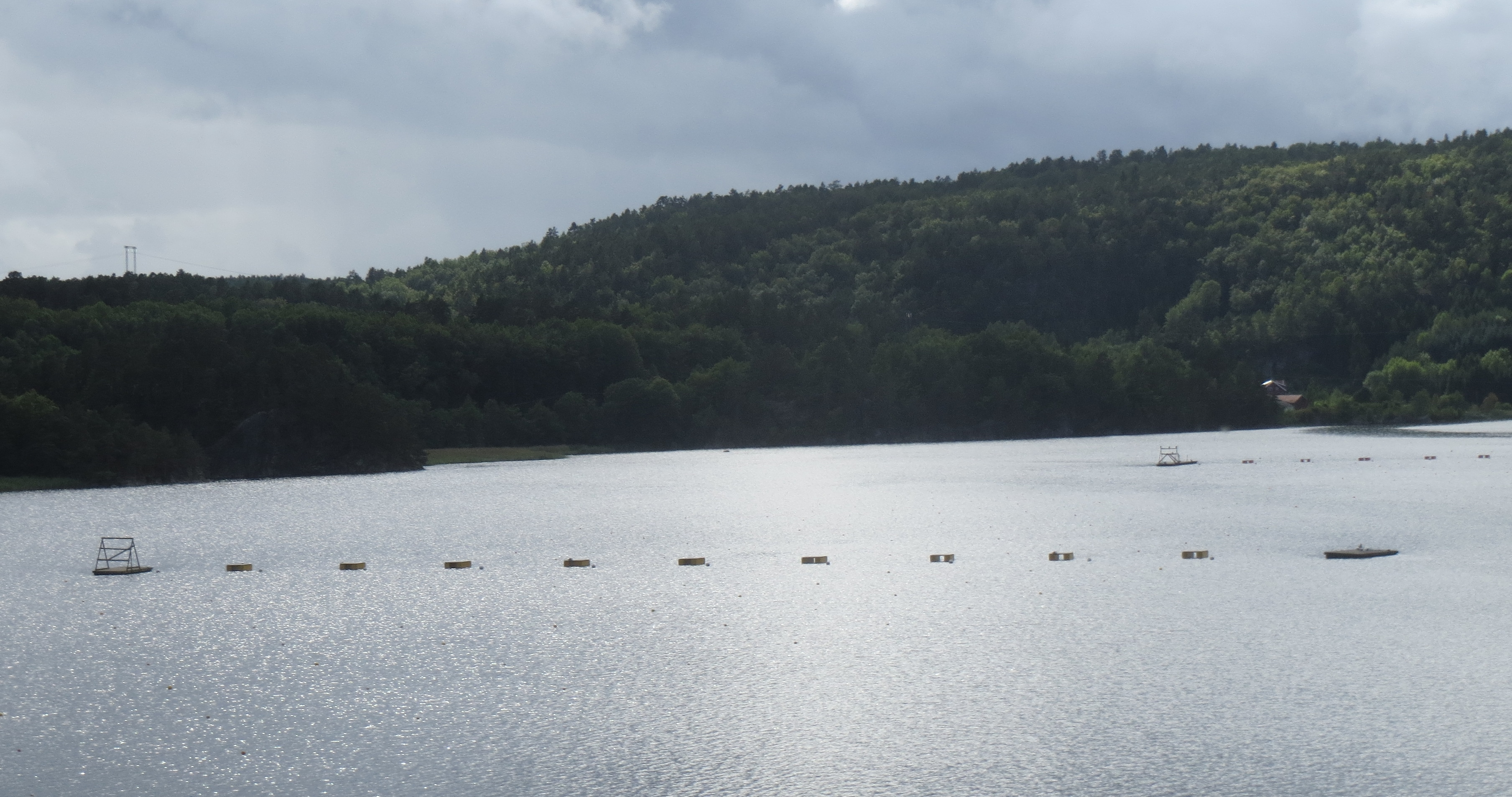
- View of the lake
- Interactive map of Gillsvannet
- Location: Kristiansand Municipality, Agder
- Coordinates: 58.1874°N 08.0234°E
- Primary outflows: Topdalsfjorden
- Basin countries: Norway
- Max. length: 1.9 kilometres (1.2 mi)
- Max. width: 1.5 kilometres (0.93 mi)
- Surface area: 1.05 km^{2} (0.41 sq mi)
- Surface elevation: 1 metre (3 ft 3 in)
- References: NVE

Gillsvannet is a freshwater lake in Kristiansand Municipality in Agder county, Norway. The 1.05-square-kilometre (260-acre) lake is located about 5 kilometres (3.1 mi) northeast of downtown Kristiansand, along County Road 452. The lake lies about 300 metres (980 ft) west of the Topdalsfjorden, at an elevation of about 1 metre (3 ft 3 in) above sea level. There is a practice range for kayaking on the lake as well as many areas used for swimming during the summer season. The Gimlekollen district lies on the southern shore of the lake and the village of Justvik lies just north of the lake.

== See also ==
- List of lakes in Norway
