= Kjøita =

Kjøita Kjøita Park
- Neighborhood in Kristiansand
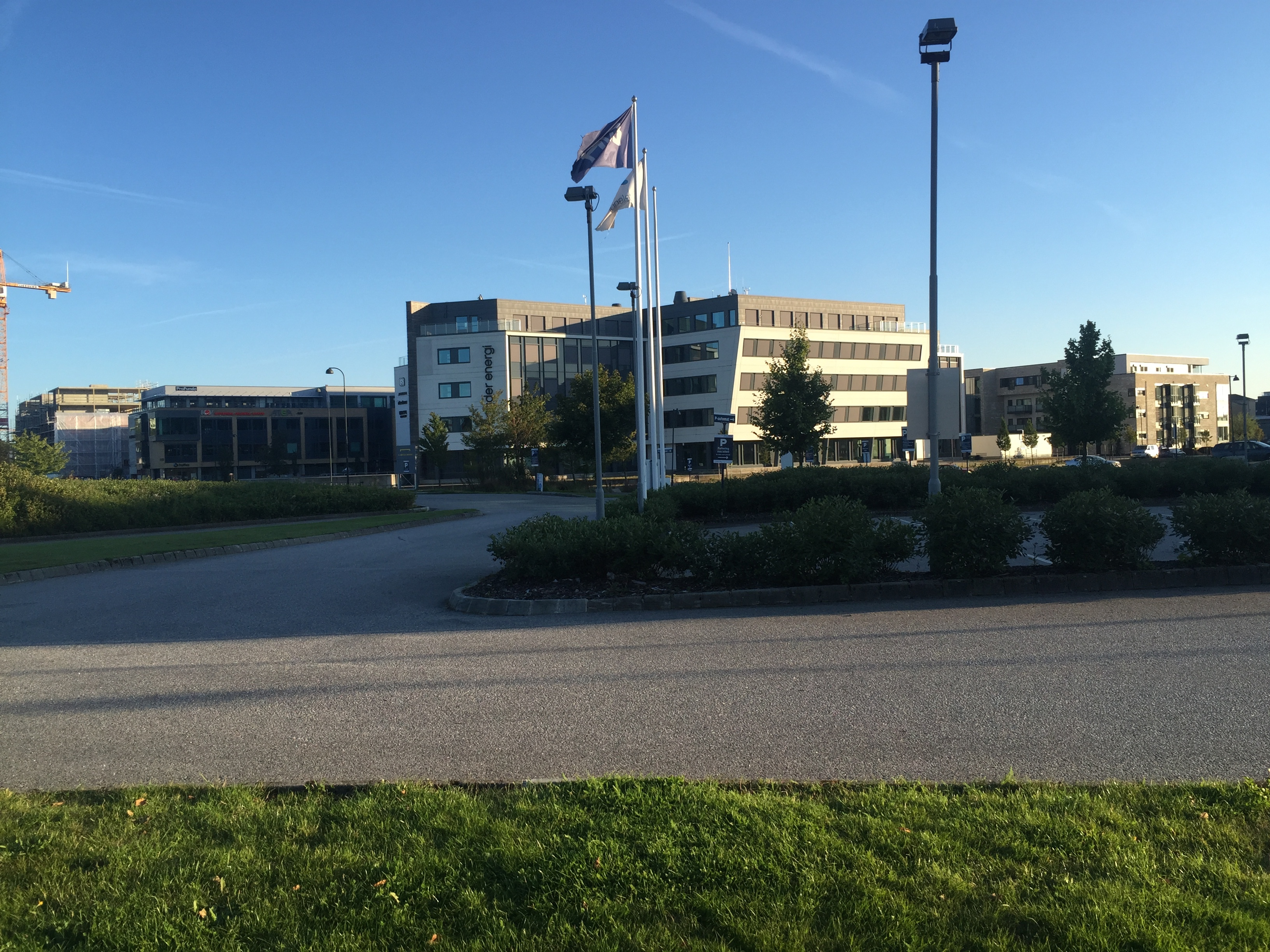
- View of the neighborhood
- Interactive map of Kjøita
- Coordinates: 58.1520°N 08.0033°E
- Country: Norway
- County: Agder
- Municipality: Kristiansand
- Borough: Lund
- District: Lund
- Elevation: 0 m (0 ft)
- Time zone: UTC+01:00 (CET)
  - Summer (DST): UTC+02:00 (CEST)
- Postal code: 4630
- Area code: 38

Kjøita or Kjøita Park is a neighbourhood in the city of Kristiansand in Agder county, Norway. It's located along the eastern shore of the Otra river in the borough of Lund. The neighborhood of Oddemarka lies to the east, Gimle lies to the north, and the centre of Lund lies to the southeast. Kjøita Park is an industrial park.

Roads through Kjøita
Line	Destination
E18	Oslo - Kjøita - Kvadraturen
Fv1	Vennesla - Lund Torv

Bus lines from Kjøita Park
Line	Destination
A2	Hånes - Kvadraturen
31	Vennesla - Kvadraturen
