= Oddernes Municipality =

Former municipality in Vest-Agder, Norway

Oddernes Municipality Oddernes herred
- Former municipality
- Oddernæs herred (historic name)
- Vest-Agder within Norway

- Oddernes within Vest-Agder
- Coordinates: 58.1597°N 08.0134°E
- Country: Norway
- County: Vest-Agder
- District: Sørlandet
- Established: 1 Jan 1838
  - Created as: Formannskapsdistrikt
- Disestablished: 1 Jan 1965
  - Succeeded by: Kristiansand Municipality
- Administrative centre: Lund

Government
  - Mayor (1958–1964): Syvert Messel (V)

Area (upon dissolution)
  - Total: 102.9 km^{2} (39.7 sq mi)
  - Rank: #416 in Norway
- Highest elevation: 284.6 m (934 ft)

Population (1964)
  - Total: 17,468
  - Rank: #31 in Norway
  - Density: 169.8/km^{2} (440/sq mi)
  - Change (10 years): ▲ +74%

Official language
  - Norwegian form: Neutral
- Time zone: UTC+01:00 (CET)
  - Summer (DST): UTC+02:00 (CEST)
- ISO 3166 code: NO-1012

Oddernes is a former municipality in the old Vest-Agder county, Norway. The 102.9-square-kilometre (39.7 sq mi) municipality existed from 1838 until its dissolution in 1965. The area is now part of Kristiansand Municipality in Agder county. Lund on the east side of the river Otra near where Lund Church is located. The old municipality encircled the town of Kristiansand, and it included the villages such as Flekkerøy, Vågsbygd, Slettheia, Strai, Mosby, and Justvik. Today, the town of Kristiansand has a borough named Oddernes, but it has very different boundaries than the old municipality had.

Prior to its dissolution in 1965, the 102.9-square-kilometre (39.7 sq mi) municipality was the 416th largest by area out of the 525 municipalities in Norway. Oddernes Municipality was the 31st most populous municipality in Norway with a population of about 17,468. The municipality's population density was 169.8 inhabitants per square kilometre (440/sq mi) and its population had increased by 74% over the previous 10-year period.

== General information ==
The parish of Oddernæs (later spelled Oddernes) was established as a municipality on 1 January 1838 (see formannskapsdistrikt law). According to the 1835 census, the municipality had a population of 2,373.

On 31 December 1893, Oddernes Municipality was divided as follows: the coastal district east of the Topdalsfjorden (population: 1,113) became the new Randesund Municipality and the western district (population: 3,076) continued as a smaller Oddernes Municipality.

On 1 July 1921, the area of Lund (population: 2,164) which is located on the headland between the mouth of the river Otra and the Topdalsfjorden was transferred from Oddernes Municipality to the town of Kristiansand, constituting a new borough in the town.

During the 1960s, there were many municipal mergers across Norway due to the work of the Schei Committee. On 1 January 1965, Oddernes Municipality was dissolved and the following areas were merged to form an enlarged Kristiansand Municipality:

- all of Oddernes Municipality (population: 18,668)
- all of Kristiansand Municipality (population: 27,100)
- all of Randesund Municipality (population: 1,672)
- all of Tveit Municipality (population: 2,802)

Today, the name lives on in the borough of Oddernes in Kristiansand, but it hardly corresponds to the area of the old municipality. In fact, the Hånes area in Oddernes borough is the only part of the borough that was also in the old Oddernes Municipality. Other places in Kristiansand that were a part of Oddernes was the entire Vågsbygd borough (except for Voiebyen) as well as Hellemyr, Strai, Mosby, Lund, and Justvik. Oddernes Church is now actually located in the borough of Lund, but it still has the same name today. Similarly, the old Oddernes High School is located in Vågsbygd Centrum, but it changed the name to Vågsbygd High School since it is no longer in Oddernes.

=== Name ===
The municipality (originally the parish) is named after the old Oddernæs farm (Old Norse: Otrunes) since the first Oddernes Church was built there. The first element is derived from the name of the local river Otra. The meaning of the river name may come from the plural genitive case of the word otr which means "otter". The last element of the name is nes which means "headland" or "peninsula". Thus the name means "otter river peninsula".

=== Churches ===
The Church of Norway had one parish (sokn) within Oddernes Municipality. At the time of the municipal dissolution, it was part of the Oddernes prestegjeld and the Kristiansand domprosti (arch-deanery) in the Diocese of Agder.

Churches in Oddernes Municipality
Parish (sokn)	Church name	Location of the church	Year built
Oddernes	Oddernes Church	Lund	c. 1040

== Geography ==
The highest point in the municipality was the 284.6-metre (934 ft) tall mountain Vehusknausen. Oddernes Municipality encircled the town of Kristiansand. After Randesund Municipality was separated from Oddernes, it left Oddernes in two non-contiguous parts: one part north of Kristiansand and the other part south of Kristiansand with the town in between the two parts. Vennesla Municipality was located to the north, Tveit Municipality was located to the northeast, Randesund Municipality was located to the east, the Skagerrak was to the south, Søgne Municipality was located to the southwest, and Songdalen Municipality was located to the west.

== Government ==
While it existed, Oddernes Municipality was responsible for primary education (through 10th grade), outpatient health services, senior citizen services, welfare and other social services, zoning, economic development, and municipal roads and utilities. The municipality was governed by a municipal council of directly elected representatives. The mayor was indirectly elected by a vote of the municipal council. The municipality was under the jurisdiction of the Torridal District Court and the Agder Court of Appeal.

=== Municipal council ===
The municipal council (Herredsstyre) of Oddernes Municipality was made up of 51 representatives that were elected to four year terms. The tables below show the historical composition of the council by political party.

Oddernes herredsstyre 1963–1964
Party name (in Norwegian)	Number of representatives
Labour Party (Arbeiderpartiet)	19
Conservative Party (Høyre)	11
Christian Democratic Party (Kristelig Folkeparti)	7
Centre Party (Senterpartiet)	1
Liberal Party (Venstre)	13
Total number of members:	51
Note: On 1 January 1965, Oddernes Municipality became part of Kristiansand Municipality.

Oddernes herredsstyre 1959–1963
Party name (in Norwegian)	Number of representatives
Labour Party (Arbeiderpartiet)	12
Conservative Party (Høyre)	6
Christian Democratic Party (Kristelig Folkeparti)	4
Centre Party (Senterpartiet)	1
Liberal Party (Venstre)	12
Total number of members:	35

Oddernes herredsstyre 1955–1959
Party name (in Norwegian)	Number of representatives
Labour Party (Arbeiderpartiet)	13
Conservative Party (Høyre)	5
Communist Party (Kommunistiske Parti)	1
Christian Democratic Party (Kristelig Folkeparti)	4
Farmers' Party (Bondepartiet)	1
Liberal Party (Venstre)	11
Total number of members:	35

Oddernes herredsstyre 1951–1955
Party name (in Norwegian)	Number of representatives
Labour Party (Arbeiderpartiet)	7
Christian Democratic Party (Kristelig Folkeparti)	3
Liberal Party (Venstre)	7
Joint List(s) of Non-Socialist Parties (Borgerlige Felleslister)	3
Total number of members:	20

Oddernes herredsstyre 1947–1951
Party name (in Norwegian)	Number of representatives
Labour Party (Arbeiderpartiet)	6
Conservative Party (Høyre)	2
Christian Democratic Party (Kristelig Folkeparti)	3
Farmers' Party (Bondepartiet)	1
Liberal Party (Venstre)	8
Total number of members:	20

Oddernes herredsstyre 1945–1947
Party name (in Norwegian)	Number of representatives
Labour Party (Arbeiderpartiet)	7
Communist Party (Kommunistiske Parti)	1
Joint list of the Liberal Party (Venstre) and the Radical People's Party (Radikale Folkepartiet)	11
Local List(s) (Lokale lister)	1
Total number of members:	20

Oddernes herredsstyre 1937–1941*
Party name (in Norwegian)	Number of representatives
Labour Party (Arbeiderpartiet)	5
Farmers' Party (Bondepartiet)	1
Liberal Party (Venstre)	11
Joint List(s) of Non-Socialist Parties (Borgerlige Felleslister)	3
Total number of members:	20
Note: Due to the German occupation of Norway during World War II, no elections were held for new municipal councils until after the war ended in 1945.

=== Mayors ===
The mayor (Norwegian: ordfører) of Oddernes Municipality was the political leader of the municipality and the chairperson of the municipal council. The following people have held this position:

- 1838–1845: Rev. Salve Salvesen
- 1845–1849: Robert Major, Jr.
- 1850–1851: Daniel Otto Christian Isaachsen
- 1852–1863: Salve Osmundsen Justnes
- 1864–1865: Syvert Jørgensen Augland
- 1866–1869: Jens J. Boysen
- 1870–1877: Ouen Salvesen Mosby
- 1878–1879: Christian Drangsholt
- 1880–1886: Ole Endresen Refsnes
- 1887–1887: Gunnar Danielsen Timenes
- 1888–1895: Ole Martinius Johnsen Mosbø
- 1896–1901: Johan Weisser
- 1902–1916: Peder Hansen Sødal
- 1917–1922: Nils Belland (V)
- 1923–1925: Søren Martinius Hagen (H)
- 1926–1928: Olaf Jansen
- 1929–1941: Karl Johan Fjermeros (V)
- 1941–1945: Søren Martinius Hagen (NS)
- 1945–1945: Karl Johan Fjermeros (V)
- 1946–1949: Syvert Messel (V)
- 1950–1957: Louis Scheie (V)
- 1958–1964: Syvert Messel (V)

== See also ==
- List of former municipalities of Norway
