= Karl Johan Fjermeros =

Norwegian politician

Karl Johan Fjermeros (29 September 1885 – 8 October 1972) was a Norwegian politician for the Liberal Party.

He was born in Høvåg Municipality. He was elected to the Norwegian Parliament from Vest-Agder in 1945, but was not re-elected in 1949.

Fjermeros was a member of the executive committee of the municipal council for Oddernes Municipality in the periods 1936–1937, 1922–1925 and 1925–1928, and then served as mayor from 1928 to 1941 as well as briefly in 1945. In 1945 he was also briefly chairman of the Vest-Agder county council. He was also acting County Governor of Vest-Agder from May to June 1945.

Outside politics he worked as a school teacher from 1908. In 1945 he was promoted to school inspector; from 1947 to 1965 he was the regional school director.
