= Brattvollsheia =

- Neighborhood in Kristiansand
- Interactive map of Brattvollsheia
- Coordinates: 58.2258°N 08.0972°E
- Country: Norway
- County: Agder
- Municipality: Kristiansand
- Borough: Oddernes
- District: Tveit
- Elevation: 58 m (190 ft)
- Time zone: UTC+01:00 (CET)
  - Summer (DST): UTC+02:00 (CEST)
- Postal code: 4658
- Area code: 38

Brattvollsheia is a neighbourhood in the city of Kristiansand in Agder county, Norway. It is located in the borough of Oddernes in the district of Tveit. Brattvollsheia is immediately north of Kjevik Airport.

== Transport ==
Roads through Brattvollsheia
Line	Destination
Norwegian County Road 453	Vennesla - Ryen

Bus lines through Brattvollsheia
Line	Destination
35	Kristiansand - Kjevik - Brattvollsheia
