= Oddemarka =

- Neighborhood in Kristiansand
- Interactive map of Oddemarka
- Coordinates: 58.1570°N 08.0145°E
- Country: Norway
- County: Agder
- Municipality: Kristiansand
- Borough: Lund
- Districts: Gimlekollen and Lund
- Time zone: UTC+01:00 (CET)
  - Summer (DST): UTC+02:00 (CEST)

Oddemarka is a neighborhood in the city of Kristiansand in Agder county, Norway. It is located in the borough of Lund. The European route E18 highway passes through a tunnel under the neighborhoods north side. The neighborhood of Presteheia lies to the north of Oddemarka, Kjøita lies to the west, and Marvika lies to the south. There are several schools located in the neighborhood, including: Kristiansand Kathedralskole Gimle, Oddemarka skole, Stienerskolen, Mottaksskolen, and Kristiansand International School.

The population fluctuates seasonally as it contains a large amount of housing for students of the nearby University of Agder.
