= Oddernes Church =

Church in Agder, Norway

- Oddernes kirke
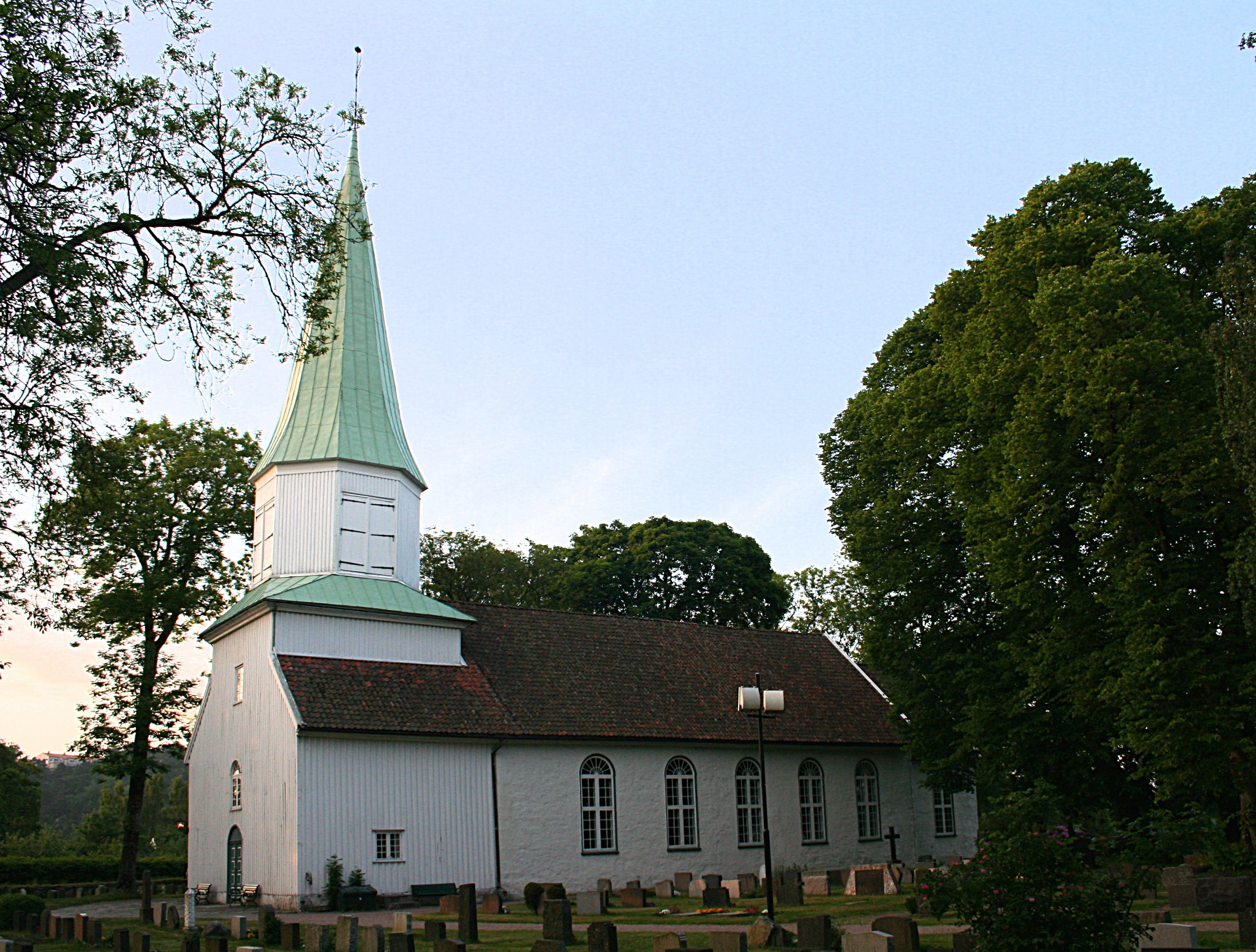
- View of the church
- Oddernes Church
- 58.1597°N 08.0134°E
- Location: Kristiansand Municipality, Agder
- Country: Norway
- Denomination: Church of Norway
- Previous denomination: Catholic Church
- Churchmanship: Evangelical Lutheran
- Website: www.oddernes.no

History
- Status: Parish church
- Founded: 1040 (986 years ago)
- Consecrated: 12th century

Architecture
- Functional status: Active
- Architectural type: Long church
- Style: Romanesque
- Completed: 12th century

Specifications
- Capacity: 395
- Materials: Stone

Administration
- Diocese: Agder og Telemark
- Deanery: Kristiansand domprosti
- Parish: Oddernes
- Norwegian Cultural Heritage Site
- Type: Church
- Status: Automatically protected
- ID: 85198

Oddernes Church (Norwegian: Oddernes kirke) is a parish church of the Church of Norway in Kristiansand Municipality in Agder county, Norway. It is located in the district of Lund in the borough of Lund in the city of Kristiansand. It is one of the churches for the Oddernes parish which is part of the Kristiansand domprosti (arch-deanery) in the Diocese of Agder og Telemark. The white, stone church was built in a long church design around the year 1040 using plans drawn up by unknown architect. This makes it the oldest building in the city of Kristiansand. The church seats about 395 people.

The chancel has rubble walls and a semi-circular apse, testifying to the church's medieval origins. The newer additions such as the tower are made out of wood. The church was the main church for the old Oddernes Municipality which existed from 1838 until 1965. North of the church is a parish house.

== History ==
=== Rune stone ===
A rune stone (now located in the porch) that originally stood in the churchyard shows the site has been central to the community even earlier in view of its possible reference to St. Olaf.

=== Founding of the church ===
Findings in burial mounds in the area testify to a settlement dating back to AD 400. It is also believed that there was a royal residence in Oddernes prior to the year 800. The first church on the site was a small wooden church or stave church where the present stone church is located. This is based on the fact that the runestone inscription from around the year 1000 mentions a church. Before the Protestant Reformation, the church was dedicated St. Olaf. The present church was built during the 1100s out of stone (some portions of the walls from that church are still part of the church today). The Romanesque stone church had a rectangular nave and a narrower, rectangular chancel with an apse.

=== Gifts and expansion ===
In the 1630s, the church nave was extended to the west by 8 metres (26 ft) after a gift of funds from King Christian IV in connection with a visit in 1635. The money was used for major repairs in 1642-1644 and in 1699 for constructing an octagonal bell tower. There are three bells in the tower, the oldest from the 13th century.

The organ, altarpiece, pulpit, and tower were all the result of gifts from the first Mayor of Kristiansand, Christen Nielssøn Wendelboe and wife during the mid-1700s. The pulpit is made in a classical baroque style. The minstrels' gallery facing the church room along the north side of the church is built in a simple Renaissance style. It has 44 segments with images of prophets, apostles, and allegorical figures.

A new interior was installed in the church in 1788 and was elaborately decorated. In the early 1800s, a sacristy was built on the north side of the choir. The decorations and embellishments of the minstrel's gallery and the walls were covered with brown paint in 1827 (until 1927 when the paint was removed).

=== Election church ===
In 1814, this church served as an election church (Norwegian: valgkirke). Together with more than 300 other parish churches across Norway, it was a polling station for elections to the 1814 Norwegian Constituent Assembly which wrote the Constitution of Norway. This was Norway's first national elections. Each church parish was a constituency that elected people called "electors" who later met together in each county to elect the representatives for the assembly that was to meet at Eidsvoll Manor later that year.

=== Parish center ===
In the 1970s, a parish center was built about 200 metres (660 ft) north of the church. It includes a parish hall and offices for the parish.

== Cemetery ==
Kristiansand's largest cemetery surrounds the church. The cemetery has memorials of all kinds of faith. There is also a separate grave chapel adjacent to the cemetery and a congregation house which is associated with Oddernes Church.

== Media gallery ==
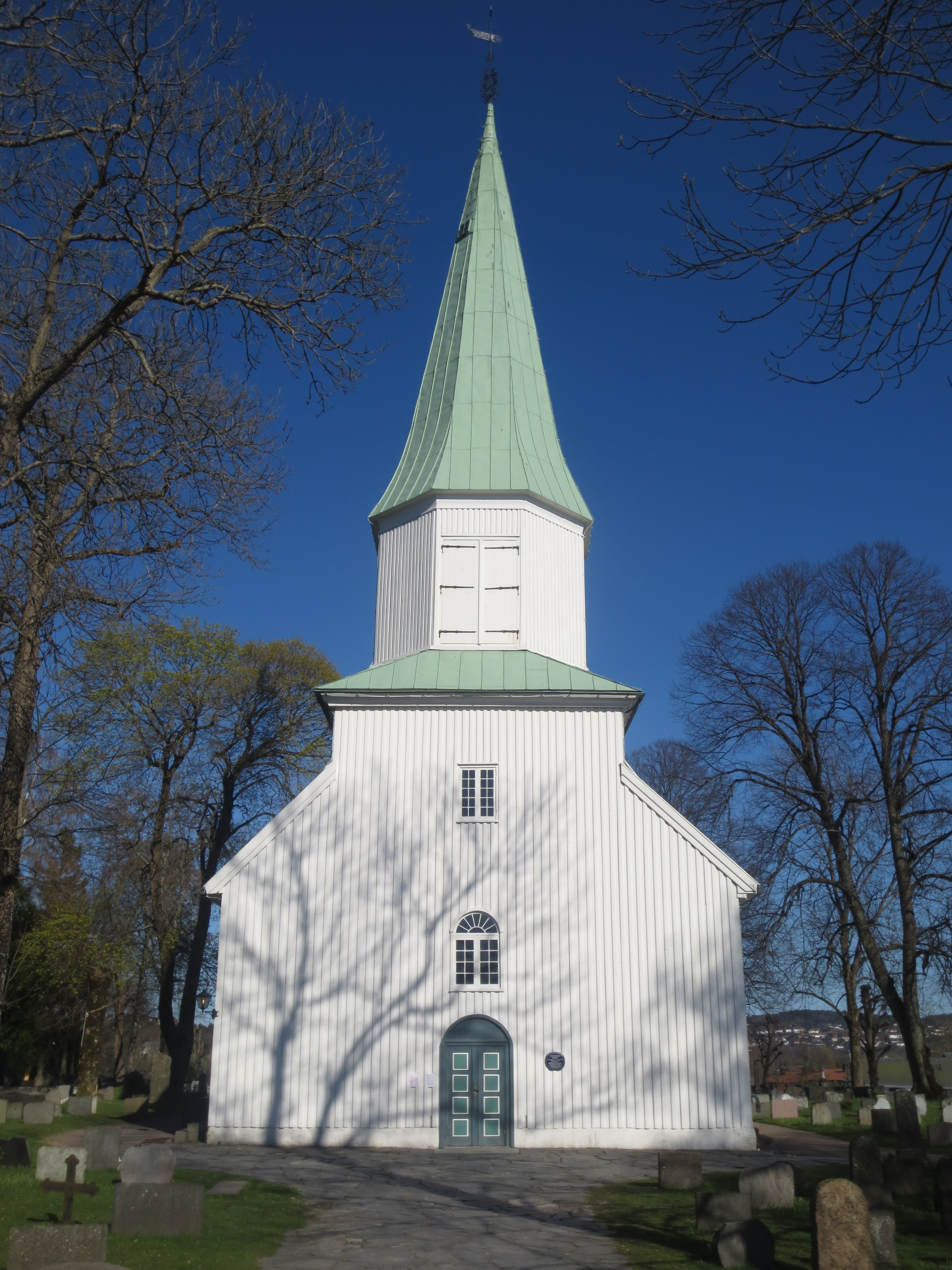
Front of church

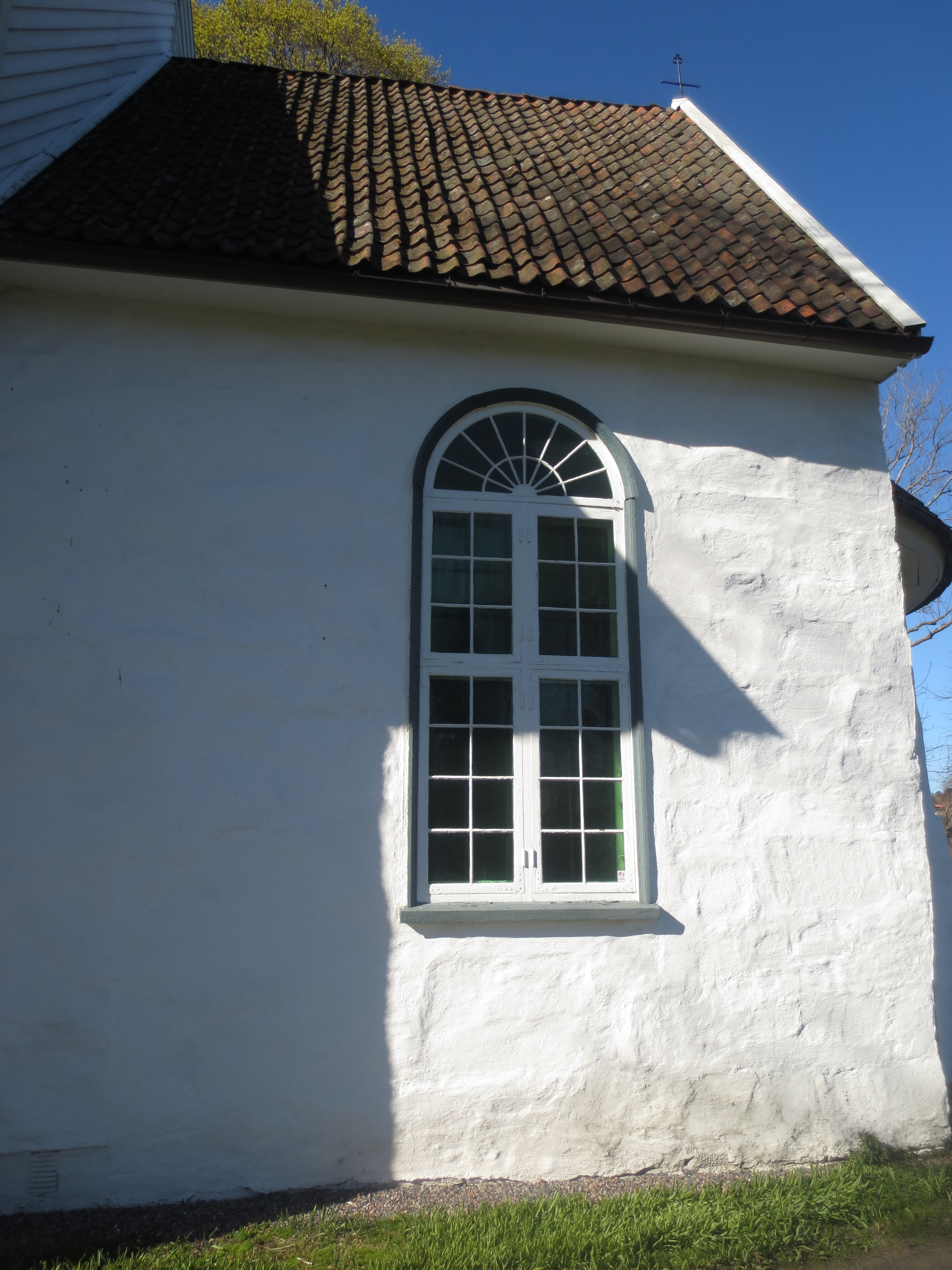
Side window detail

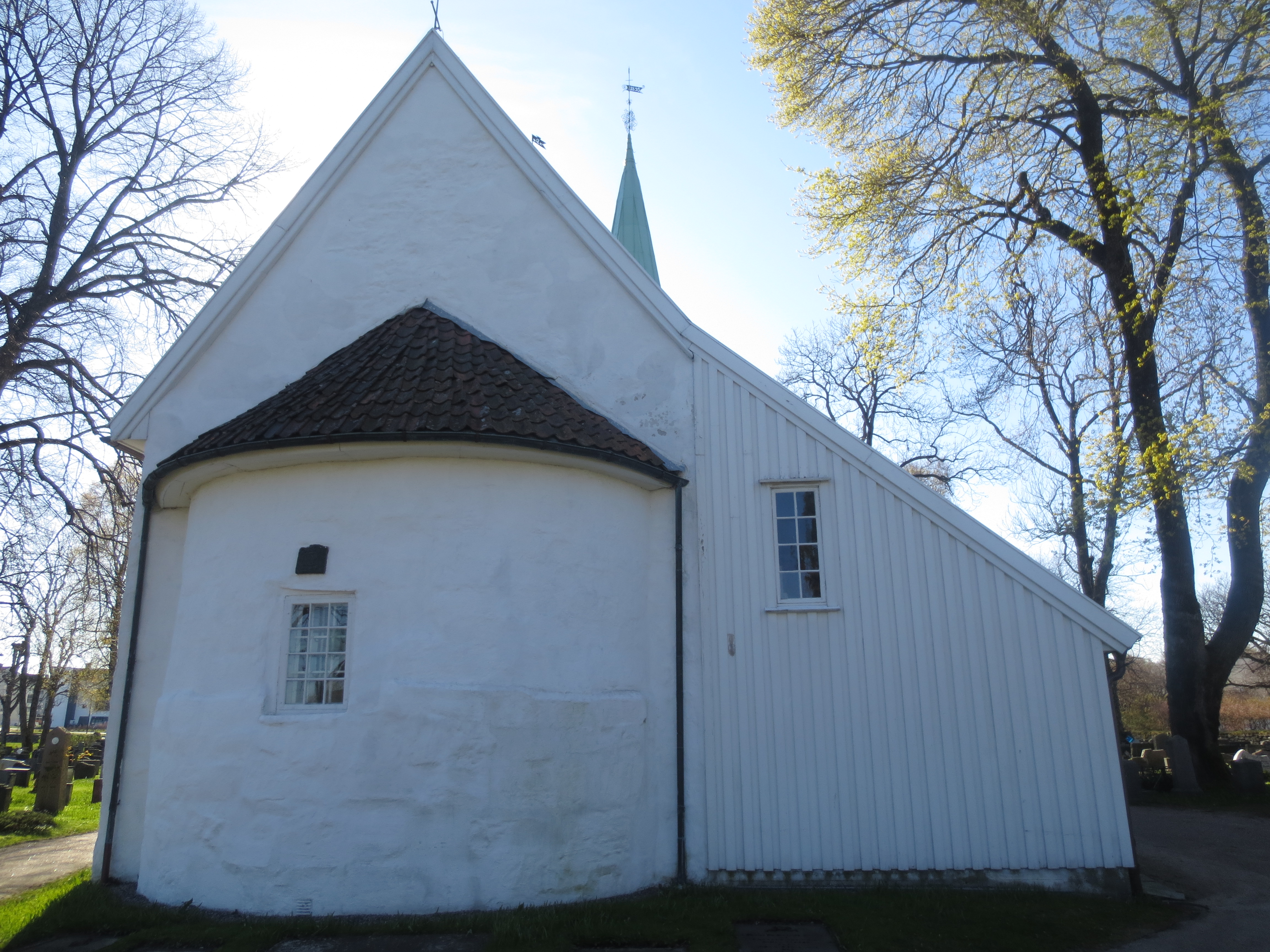
Back side of church

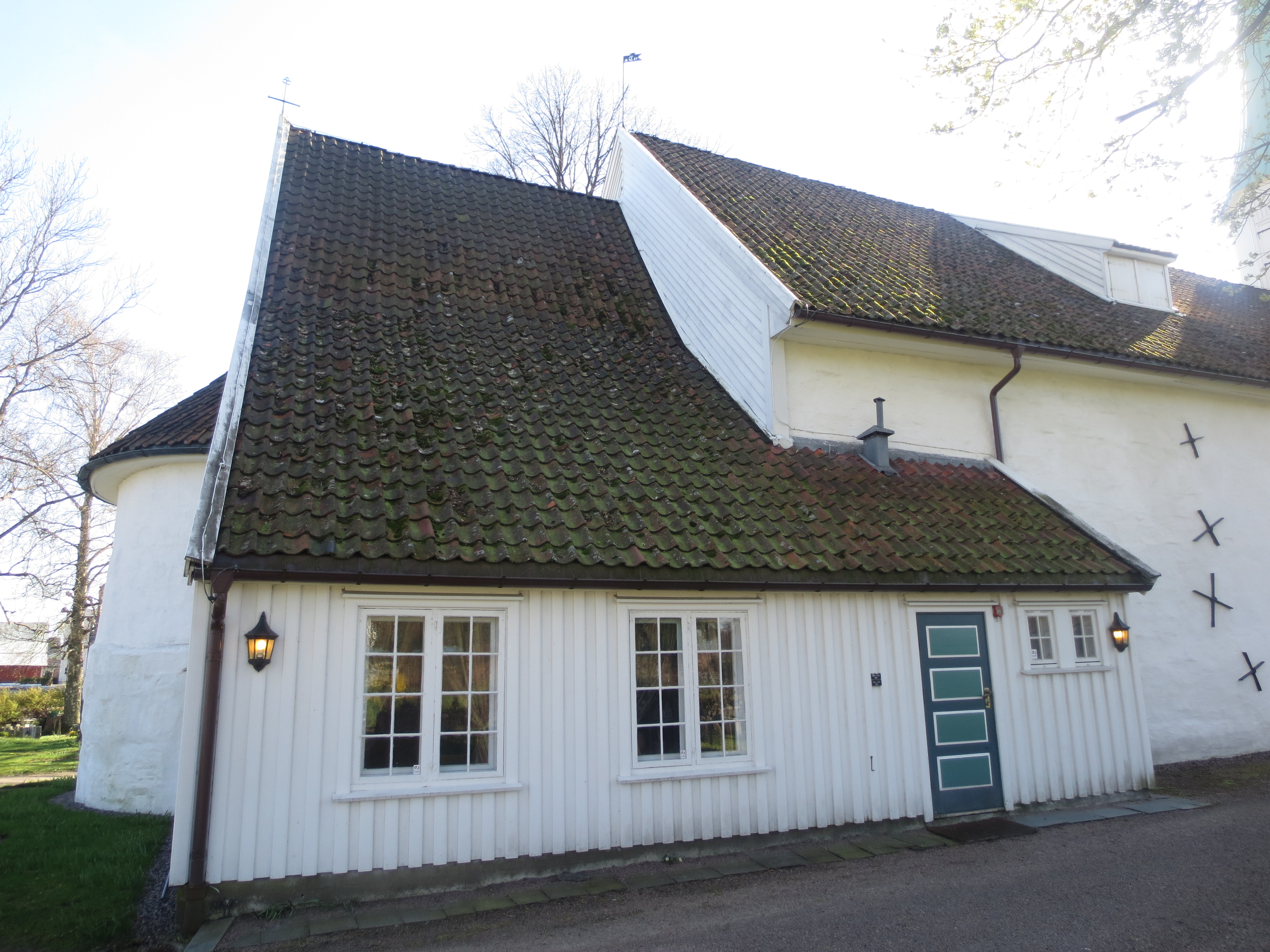
Side view of the church

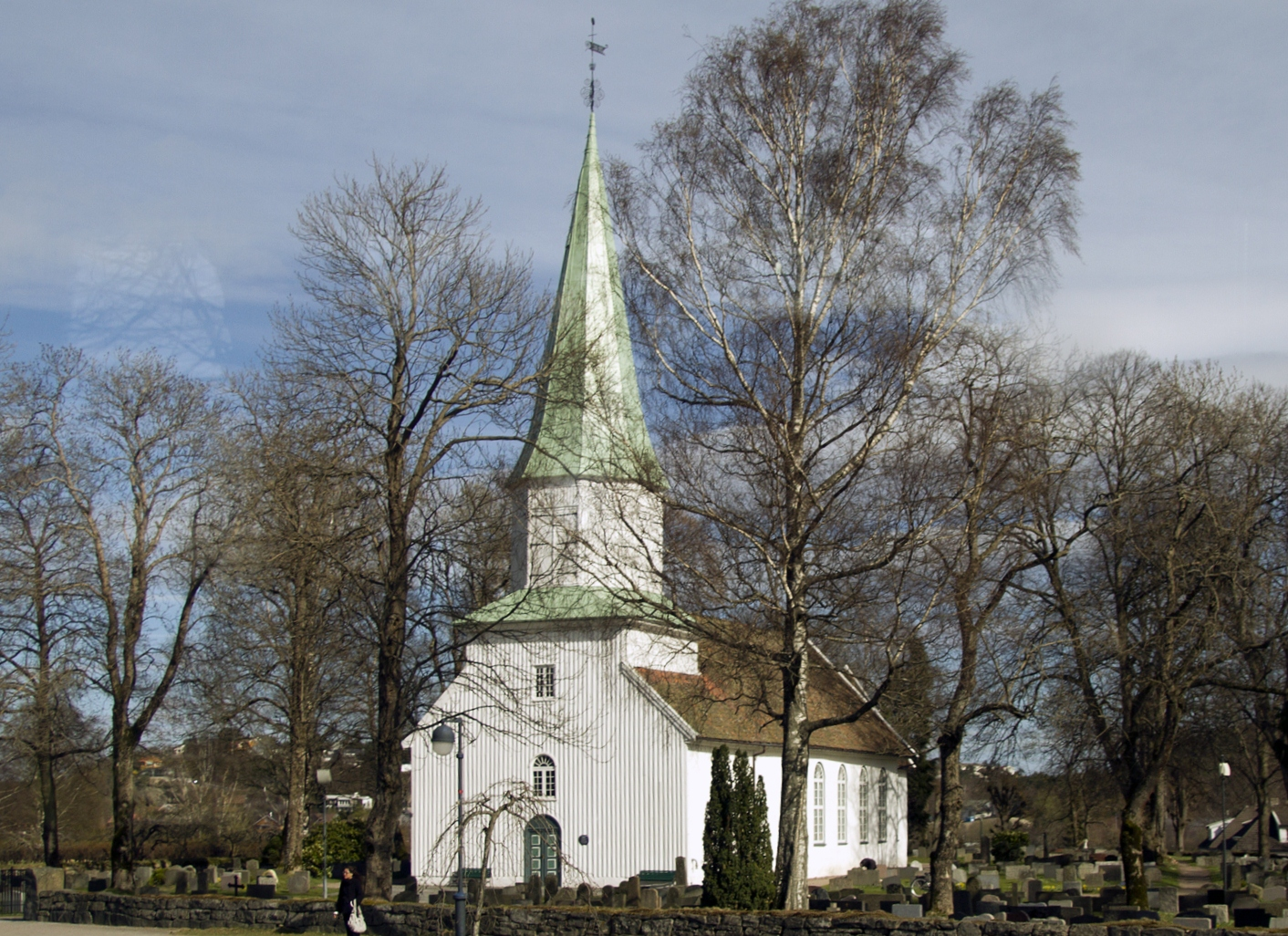
Exterior view of the churchyard

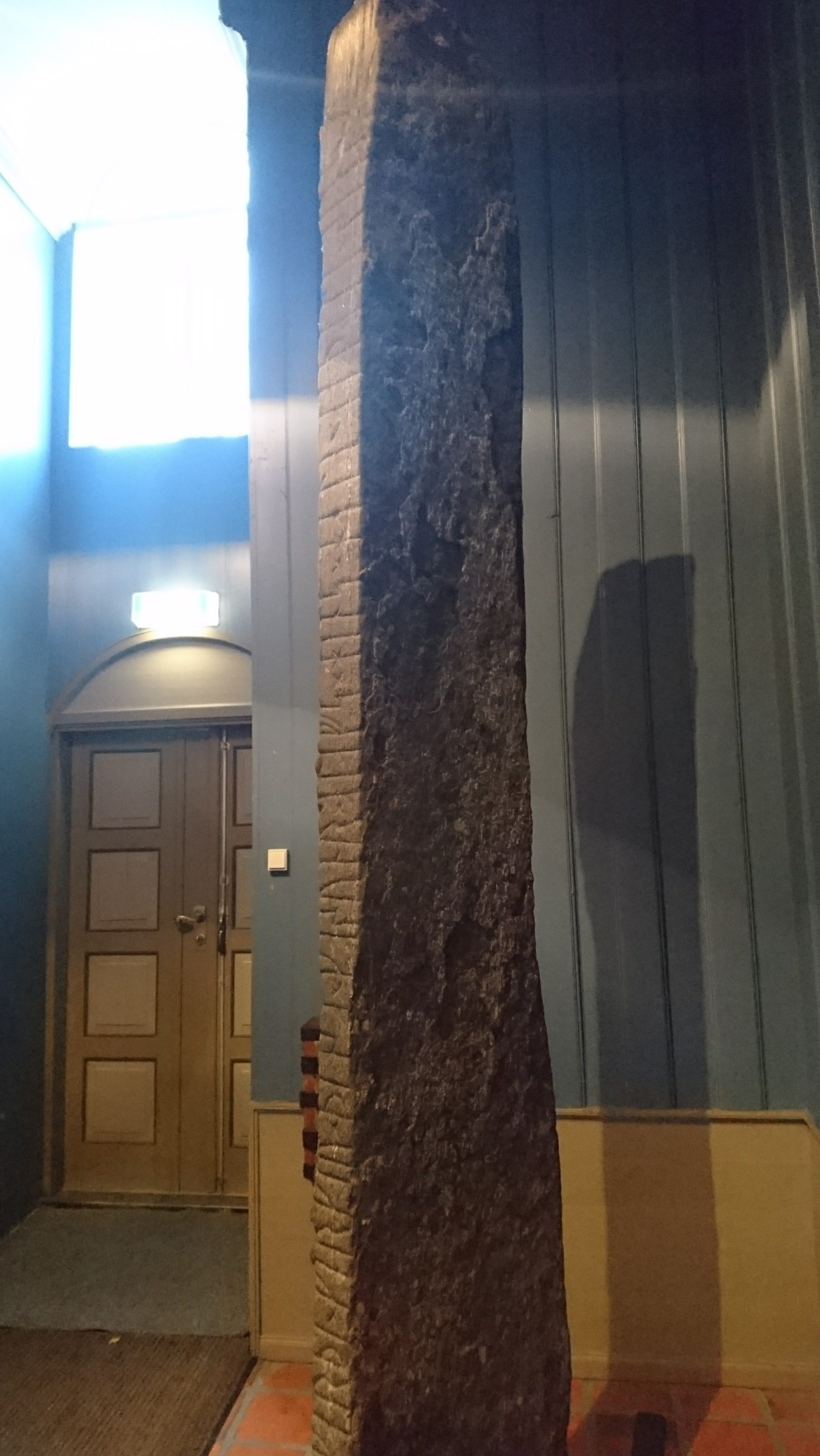
Oddernes stone inside the church

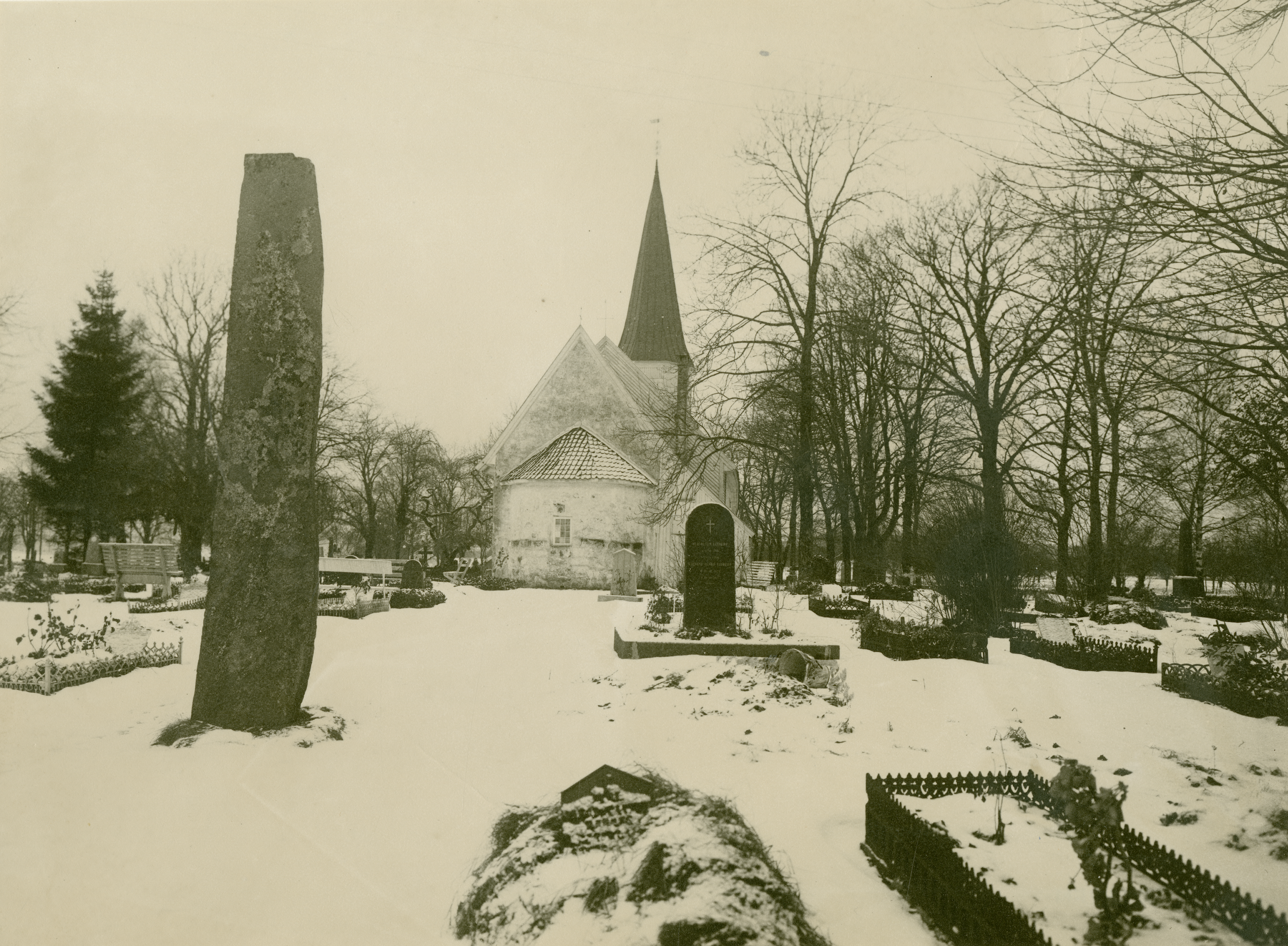
Former location of the Oddernes stone.
Source: Norwegian Directorate for Cultural Heritage

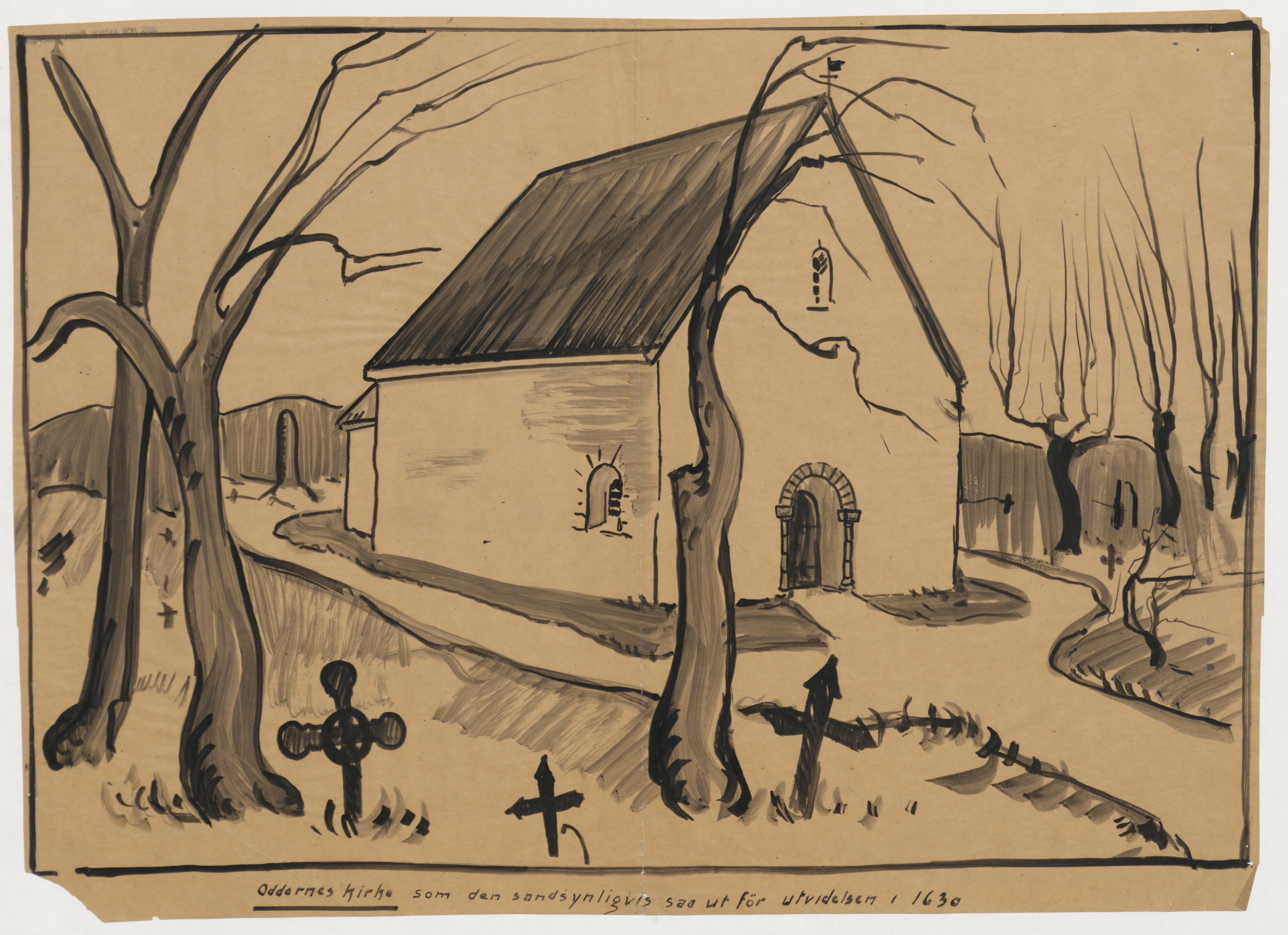
The church as it probably looked like before the expansion in 1630. Source: Norwegian Directorate for Cultural Heritage

== See also ==
- List of churches in Agder og Telemark
