= Vollevannet =

Lake in Kristiansand, Norway

- Vollevann; Vollevatnet
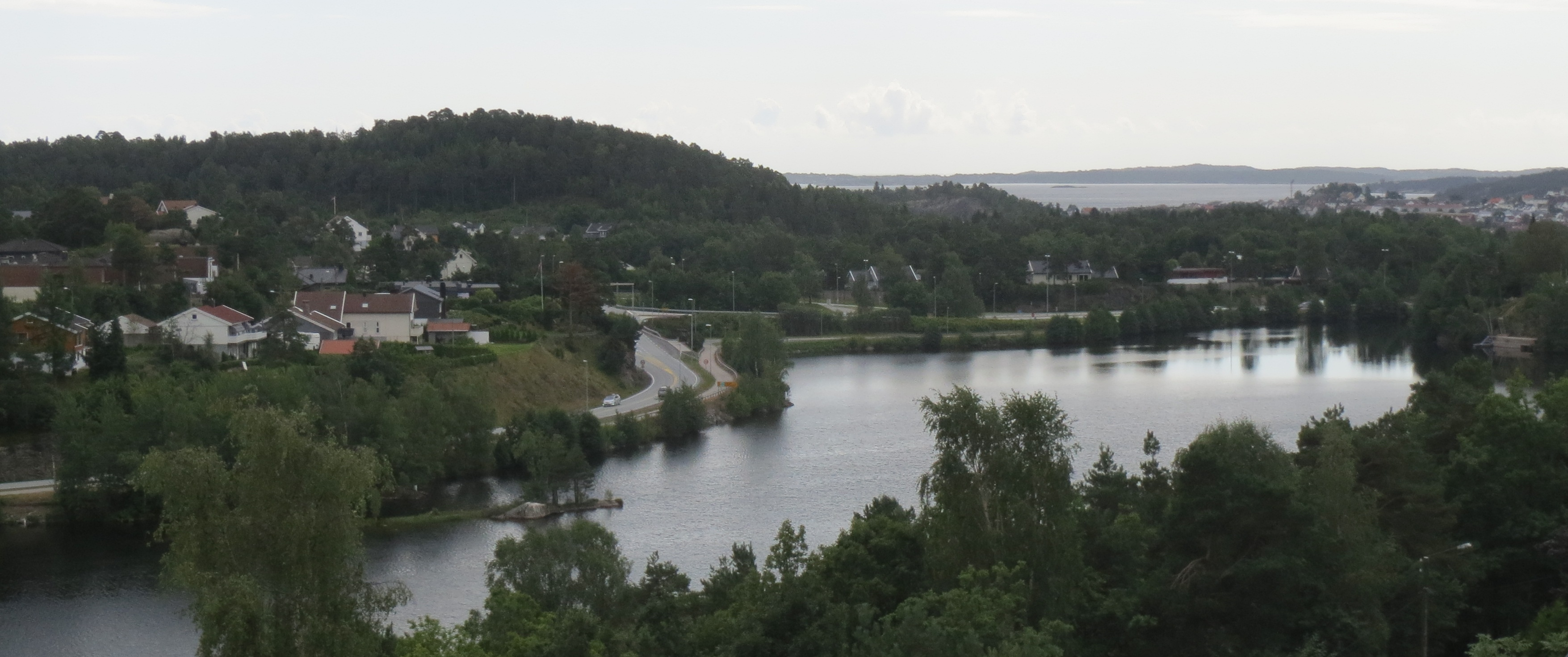
- View of the lake
- Interactive map of Vollevannet
- Location: Kristiansand Municipality, Agder
- Coordinates: 58.1683°N 08.0320°E
- Basin countries: Norway
- Max. length: 780 metres (2,560 ft)
- Max. width: 375 metres (1,230 ft)
- Surface area: 0.15 km^{2} (0.058 sq mi)
- Surface elevation: 34 metres (112 ft)
- References: NVE

Vollevannet is a freshwater lake in Kristiansand Municipality in Agder county, Norway. The 0.15-square-kilometre (37-acre) lake lies in the district of Gimlekollen in the borough of Lund, and the surrounding residential area is also called Vollevannet. The lake lies along the European route E18 highway at the exit for the Vest-Agder Museum Kristiansand and Ålefjær (county road 452). Historically, the lake was used as a reservoir for the city's drinking water. The lake is held back by two dams, and there is a small, sandy beach at the northeast end of the lake. The lake has perch in it.

== Historical events ==
In February 1943, during the German occupation of Norway, two Russian prisoners of war accused of burglary as well as attempting to escape were executed at the end of the lake Vollevannet. The two Russians were buried in the same grave. Two months later another Russian who had refused to work and had encouraged others to refuse was taken to Vollevannet and shot about 50 metres (160 ft) from the first grave. At the end of the war, the bodies of all three were dug up and taken to the Kristiansand crematorium. A memorial cross marks their former graves.

== See also ==
- List of lakes in Norway
