= Gimlekollen =

District Gimlekollen
- District in Kristiansand
- Coat of arms

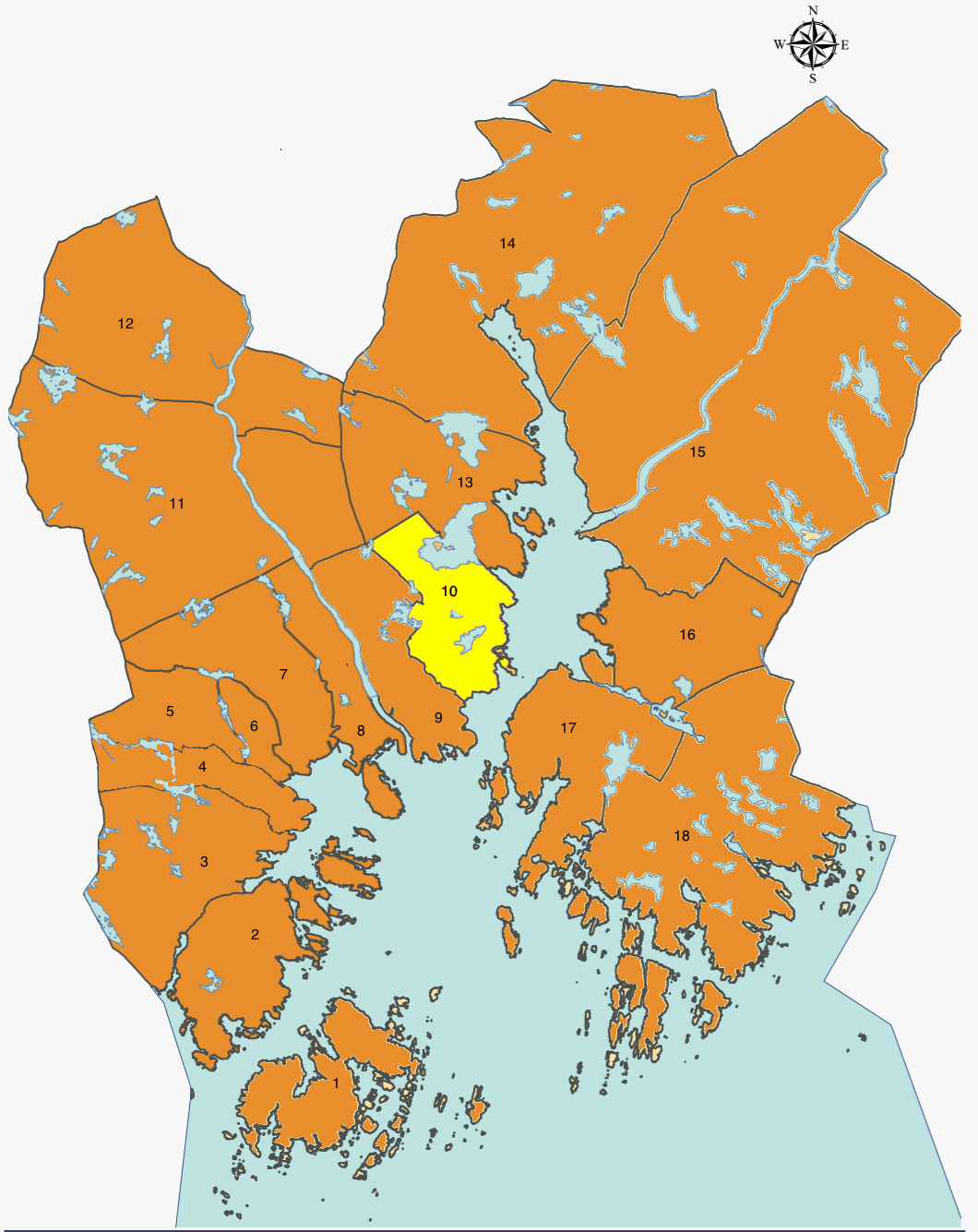
- Interactive map of District Gimlekollen
- Coordinates: 58.1719°N 08.0300°E
- Country: Norway
- Region: Southern Norway
- County: Agder
- Municipality: Kristiansand
- Borough: Lund
- Elevation: 86 m (282 ft)

Population (2014)
  - Total: 5,200
- Time zone: UTC+01:00 (CET)
  - Summer (DST): UTC+02:00 (CEST)
- ISO 3166 code: NO-030112
- Website: kristiansand.kommune.no

Gimlekollen is a district in the city of Kristiansand in Agder county, Norway. It is a part of the borough of Lund. The district of Justvik lies to the north, the district of Lund (centrum) lies to the west and southwest, and the Topdalsfjorden lies to the east. NLA Media college is located in Gimlekollen. The lakes Vollevannet and Gillsvannet lie in the district.

== Transportation ==
Bus transportation from/through Gimlekollen
Line	Destination
22	Jærnesheia-Gimlekollen - Kvadraturen
22	Ålefjær-Gimlekollen - Kvadraturen
23	Jærnesheia-Vollevannet - Kvadraturen
23	Ålefjær-Vollevannet - Kvadraturen

== Politics ==
The 10 largest political parties in Gimlekollen in 2015:

Kristiansand City Council Parties	Votes
Conservative Party	30,4% (528 votes)
Labour Party	24,6% (427 votes)
Christian Democratic Party	18,4% (319 votes)
Progress Party	6,5% (113 votes)
Liberal Party	5,8% (101 votes)
Green Party	4,8% (83 votes)
The Democrats	2,5% (43 votes)
Socialist Left Party	2,4% (42 votes)
The Pensioners'	1,7% (30 votes)
Centre Party	1,2% (20 votes)

== Education ==
Gimlekollen NLA College is located in Gimlekollen.

== Neighbourhoods ==
- Bjørndalssletta
- Gimlekollen
- Gimlekollen vest
- Gimlekollen øst
- Narviga
- Prestebekken
- Presteheia
- Volleåsen

== Photos ==
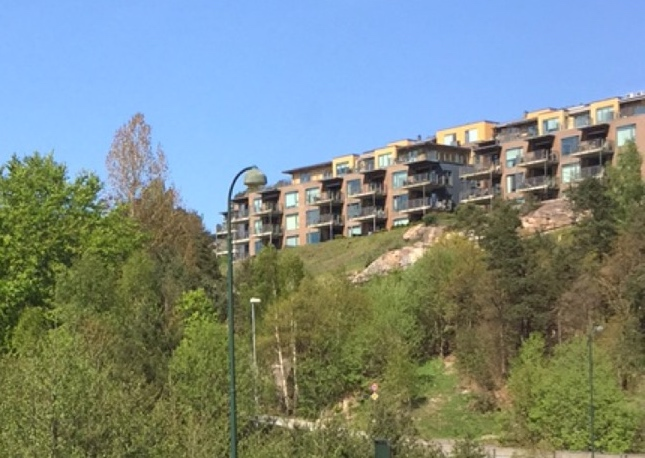
Prestheia

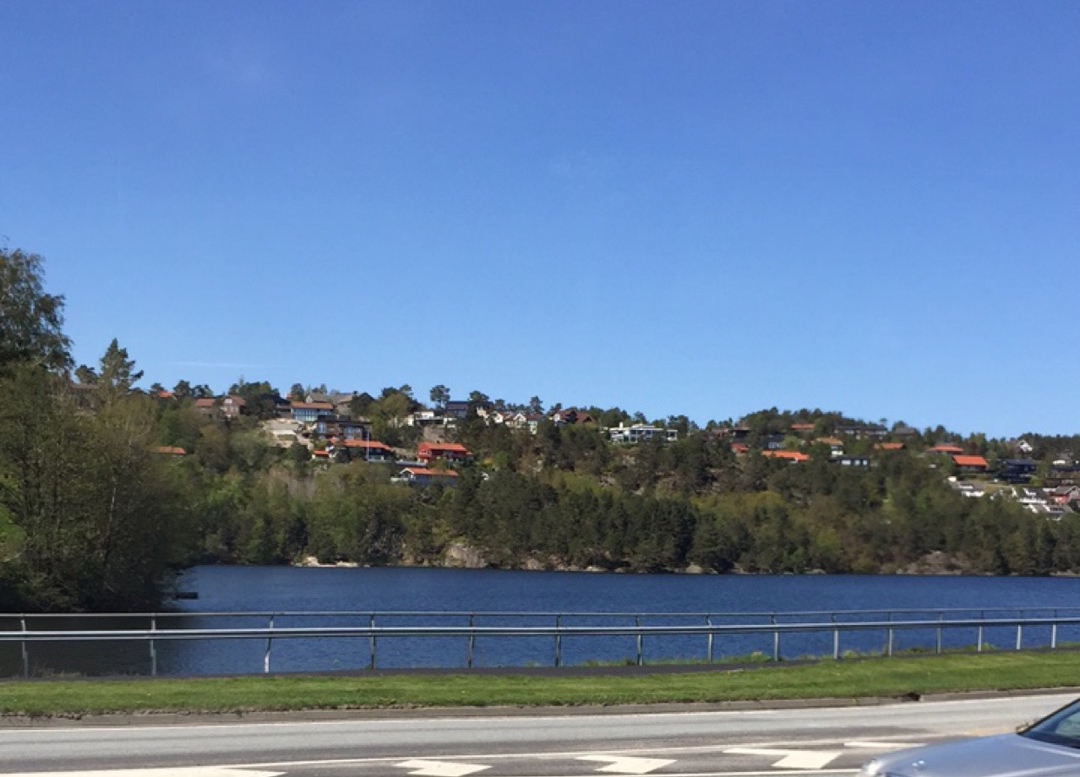
Vollevannet with Gimlekollen in the background
