= Tveit (disambiguation) =

Tveit may refer to:

== People ==
- Aaron Tveit (born 1983), an American actor and singer
- Alf Kåre Tveit (born 1967), a Norwegian former footballer who played from 1988 to 1993 for Viking FK
- Astrid Tveit (born 1957), a retired Norwegian high jumper
- Christian Tveit (born 1992), a Norwegian football striker from Farsund
- Espen Tveit (born 1991), a Norwegian speed skater
- Ivar Tveit (1880–1952), a Norwegian newspaper editor
- John S. Tveit (born 1931), a Norwegian politician for the Christian Democratic Party
- Odd Karsten Tveit (born 1945), a Norwegian journalist, writer, and economist
- Olav Fykse Tveit (born 1960), a Norwegian Lutheran theologian
- Nils Tveit (1876–1949), a Norwegian politician for the Liberal Party

== Places ==
- Tveit, a village and district in the city of Kristiansand in Agder county, Norway
- Tveit Municipality, a former municipality in the old Vest-Agder county, Norway
- Tveit, Åmli, a village in Åmli municipality in Agder county, Norway
- Tveit, Bygland, a village in Bygland municipality in Agder county, Norway

== Churches ==
- Tveit Church (Agder), Norway, a parish church
- Tveit Church (Vestland), Norway, a parish church

== See also ==
- Tveite (disambiguation)
