= Tveit Municipality =

Former municipality in Vest-Agder, Norway

Tveit Municipality Tveit herred
- Former municipality
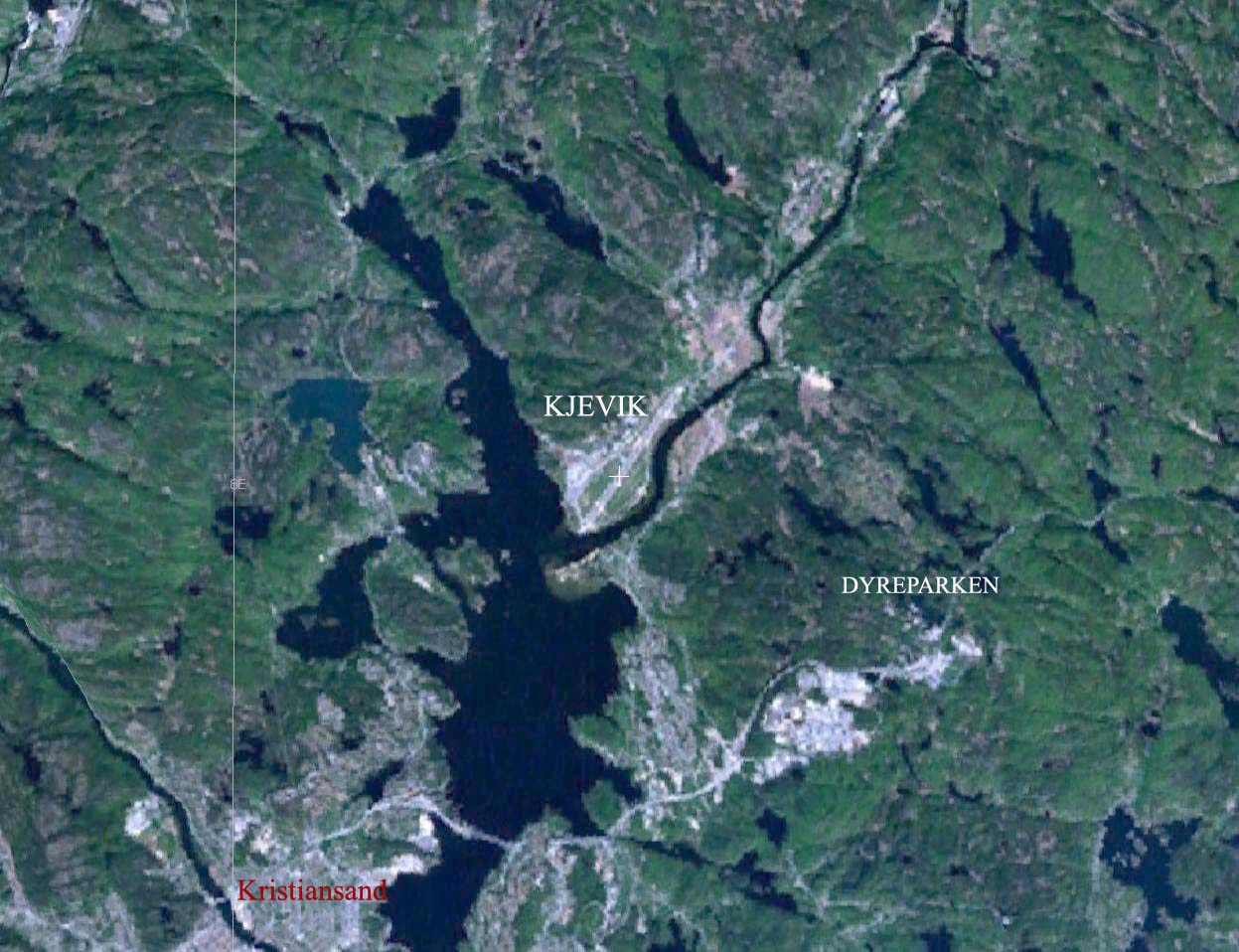
- Aerial view of Tveit (northeast of the fjord)

- Vest-Agder within Norway

- Tveit within Vest-Agder
- Coordinates: 58.2279°N 08.1204°E
- Country: Norway
- County: Vest-Agder
- District: Sørlandet
- Established: 1 Jan 1838
  - Created as: Formannskapsdistrikt
- Disestablished: 1 Jan 1965
  - Succeeded by: Kristiansand Municipality
- Administrative centre: Tveit

Government
  - Mayor (1963-1964): Ivar Opdahl

Area (upon dissolution)
  - Total: 107.3 km^{2} (41.4 sq mi)
  - Rank: #413 in Norway
- Highest elevation: 277.6 m (911 ft)

Population (1964)
  - Total: 2,725
  - Rank: #324 in Norway
  - Density: 25.4/km^{2} (66/sq mi)
  - Change (10 years): ▲ +35.6%
- Demonym: Tveitsokning

Official language
  - Norwegian form: Neutral
- Time zone: UTC+01:00 (CET)
  - Summer (DST): UTC+02:00 (CEST)
- ISO 3166 code: NO-1013

Tveit is a former municipality in the old Vest-Agder county, Norway. The 107.3-square-kilometre (41.4 sq mi) municipality existed from 1838 until its dissolution in 1965. The area is now part of Kristiansand Municipality in Agder county. The administrative centre was the village of Tveit where Tveit Church is located.

Prior to its dissolution in 1965, the 107.3-square-kilometre (41.4 sq mi) municipality was the 413th largest by area out of the 525 municipalities in Norway. Tveit Municipality was the 324th most populous municipality in Norway with a population of about 2,725. The municipality's population density was 25.4 inhabitants per square kilometre (66/sq mi) and its population had increased by 35.6% over the previous 10-year period.

== General information ==
The parish of Tveit was established as a municipality on 1 January 1838 (see formannskapsdistrikt law).

During the 1960s, there were many municipal mergers across Norway due to the work of the Schei Committee. On 1 January 1965, Tveit Municipality was dissolved and the following areas were merged to form an enlarged Kristiansand Municipality:

- all of Tveit Municipality (population: 2,802)
- all of Kristiansand Municipality (population: 27,100)
- all of Oddernes Municipality (population: 18,668)
- all of Randesund Municipality (population: 1,672)

=== Name ===
The municipality (originally the parish) is named after the old Tveit farm (Old Norse: Þveit) since the first Tveit Church was built there. The name is identical to the word þveit which means "a piece of cleared land cut from a forest". Historically, the spelling of the name has varied including Tved, Thvet, and Tveid.

=== Churches ===
The Church of Norway had one parish (sokn) within Tveit Municipality. At the time of the municipal dissolution, it was part of the Tveit prestegjeld and the Kristiansand domprosti (arch-deanery) in the Diocese of Agder.

Churches in Tveit Municipality
Parish (sokn)	Church name	Location of the church	Year built
Tveit	Tveit Church	Tveit	c. 1100

== Geography ==
The municipality was located along the Topdalselva river. The highest point in the municipality was the 277.6-metre (911 ft) tall mountain Slettehei, located along the northern border with Vennesla Municipality. Birkenes Municipality was located to the north, Høvåg Municipality was located to the east, Randesund Municipality was located to the south, Oddernes Municipality was located to the southwest, and Vennesla Municipality was located to the northwest.

== Government ==
While it existed, Tveit Municipality was responsible for primary education (through 10th grade), outpatient health services, senior citizen services, welfare and other social services, zoning, economic development, and municipal roads and utilities. The municipality was governed by a municipal council of directly elected representatives. The mayor was indirectly elected by a vote of the municipal council. The municipality was under the jurisdiction of the Torridal District Court and the Agder Court of Appeal.

=== Municipal council ===
The municipal council (Herredsstyre) of Tveit Municipality was made up of 17 representatives that were elected to four year terms. The tables below show the historical composition of the council by political party.

Tveit herredsstyre 1963–1964
Party name (in Norwegian)	Number of representatives
Labour Party (Arbeiderpartiet)	7
Conservative Party (Høyre)	1
Christian Democratic Party (Kristelig Folkeparti)	2
Centre Party (Senterpartiet)	2
Socialist People's Party (Sosialistisk Folkeparti)	1
Liberal Party (Venstre)	4
Total number of members:	17
Note: On 1 January 1965, Tveit Municipality became part of Kristiansand Municipality.

Tveit herredsstyre 1959–1963
Party name (in Norwegian)	Number of representatives
Labour Party (Arbeiderpartiet)	6
Christian Democratic Party (Kristelig Folkeparti)	1
Centre Party (Senterpartiet)	3
Liberal Party (Venstre)	3
Total number of members:	13

Tveit herredsstyre 1955–1959
Party name (in Norwegian)	Number of representatives
Labour Party (Arbeiderpartiet)	6
Christian Democratic Party (Kristelig Folkeparti)	1
Farmers' Party (Bondepartiet)	3
Liberal Party (Venstre)	3
Total number of members:	13

Tveit herredsstyre 1951–1955
Party name (in Norwegian)	Number of representatives
Labour Party (Arbeiderpartiet)	4
Christian Democratic Party (Kristelig Folkeparti)	2
Farmers' Party (Bondepartiet)	2
Liberal Party (Venstre)	4
Total number of members:	12

Tveit herredsstyre 1947–1951
Party name (in Norwegian)	Number of representatives
Labour Party (Arbeiderpartiet)	4
Christian Democratic Party (Kristelig Folkeparti)	2
Farmers' Party (Bondepartiet)	3
Liberal Party (Venstre)	3
Total number of members:	12

Tveit herredsstyre 1945–1947
Party name (in Norwegian)	Number of representatives
Labour Party (Arbeiderpartiet)	4
Farmers' Party (Bondepartiet)	3
Liberal Party (Venstre)	5
Total number of members:	12

Tveit herredsstyre 1937–1941*
Party name (in Norwegian)	Number of representatives
Labour Party (Arbeiderpartiet)	2
Farmers' Party (Bondepartiet)	3
Liberal Party (Venstre)	7
Total number of members:	12
Note: Due to the German occupation of Norway during World War II, no elections were held for new municipal councils until after the war ended in 1945.

=== Mayors ===
The mayor (Norwegian: ordfører) of Tveit Municipality was the political leader of the municipality and the chairperson of the municipal council. The following people have held this position:

- 1838–1843: Johan Jørgen Broch
- 1844–1847: Daniel G. Timenes
- 1848–1849: Lars T. Litander
- 1850–1853: Jørgen Gunnufsen Drangsholt
- 1854–1855: Christian Jørgensen Drangsholt
- 1856–1857: Lars T. Litander
- 1858–1861: John Tellefsen Strømme
- 1862–1863: Johannes Rosenvold Andersen
- 1864–1865: Ole Johnsen Bærli
- 1866–1867: Knud A. Bjelle
- 1868–1869: Nils Andersen Borgen
- 1870–1871: Aage G. Dønnestad
- 1872–1873: Knud A. Aalefjær
- 1874–1877: Christian Gundersen Ve
- 1878–1879: Knud A. Bjelle
- 1880–1885: Theodor Stausland
- 1886–1887: Torjus T. Dønnestad
- 1888–1910: Ole Taraldsen Eieland
- 1911–1913: Jakob Foss
- 1914–1919: Cay Hegermann
- 1920–1922: Karl M. Knudsen
- 1923–1925: Gunnar Dønnestad
- 1926–1931: Karl M. Knudsen
- 1932–1934: Olav Lømsland
- 1935–1937: Petter Nygård
- 1938–1942: Karl M. Knudsen
- 1943–1944: Bernhart Ryen
- 1945–1948: Karl M. Knudsen
- 1949–1958: Torgeir Tveit
- 1959–1962: Hans Ommedal
- 1963–1964: Ivar Opdahl

== See also ==
- List of former municipalities of Norway
