= Ve, Norway =

Village in Kristiansand Municipality, Norway

Ve
- Village
- Interactive map of Ve
- Coordinates: 58.20839°N 8.10303°E
- Country: Norway
- Region: Southern Norway
- County: Agder
- Municipality: Kristiansand Municipality
- Borough: Tveit
- Elevation: 14 m (46 ft)
- Time zone: UTC+01:00 (CET)
  - Summer (DST): UTC+02:00 (CEST)

Ve is a village in Kristiansand Municipality in Agder county, Norway. The small village is located just east of the centre of the city of Kristiansand in the district of Tveit in the borough of Oddernes.

The village is located along the Norwegian National Road 41, along the river Tovdalselva, and across the river from Kristiansand Airport, Kjevik.

== See also ==
- List of short place names
