= Tveit =

District Tveit
- District
- Coat of arms

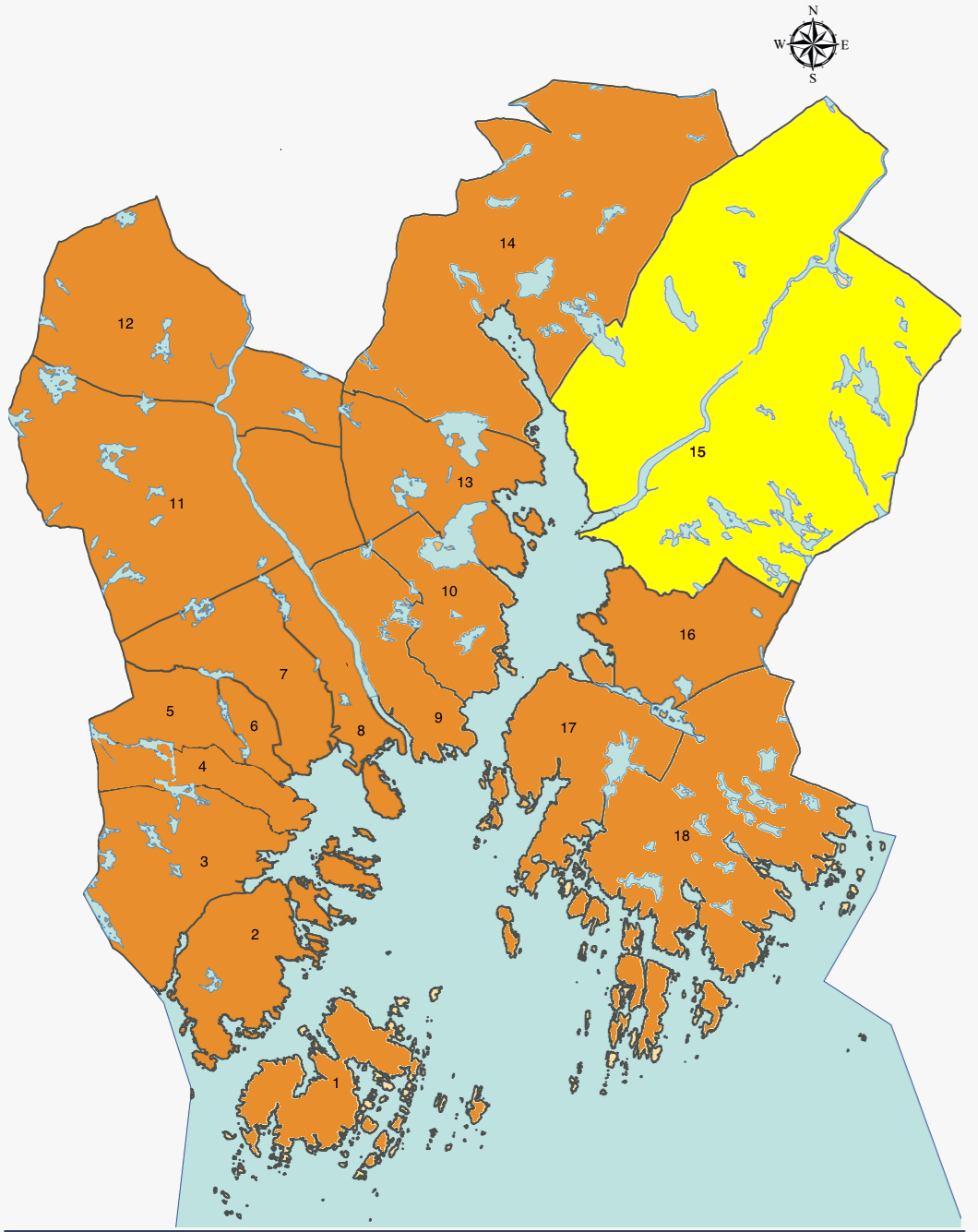
- Interactive map of District Tveit
- Coordinates: 58.2236°N 08.1098°E
- Country: Norway
- Region: Southern Norway
- County: Agder
- City: Kristiansand
- Boroughs: Oddernes
- Elevation: 33 m (108 ft)

Population (2014)
  - Total: 2,000
- Time zone: UTC+01:00 (CET)
  - Summer (DST): UTC+02:00 (CEST)
- ISO 3166 code: NO-030112
- Website: kristiansand.kommune.no

Tveit is a village and surrounding district in Oddernes borough in the city of Kristiansand in Agder county, Norway. The Tveit district is located in the northeastern part of Kristiansand, northeast of the Topdalsfjorden along the lower part of the Tovdalselva river. Tveit is the site of the main airport for Southern Norway: Kristiansand Airport, Kjevik. The district was the separate Tveit Municipality from 1838 until it was merged into Kristiansand Municipality in 1965.

The village of Tveit lies along the Tovdalselva river, about 3 kilometres (1.9 mi) northeast of the airport. Tveit Church is located in the village. The stone church was built in the 12th century, and it is the oldest building in the village. The 1.07-square-kilometre (260-acre) village has a population (2025) of 1,613 and a population density of 1,507 inhabitants per square kilometre (3,900/sq mi).

== Name ==
The district (originally the parish) was named after the old Tveit farm (Old Norse: Þveit), since the Tveit Church was built there. The name is identical with the word þveit which means 'a piece of cleared land cut from a forest'. The name spelled differently over the centuries: Tved, Thvet, and Tveid.

== Sports ==
In 2010, the municipal council of Kristiansand Municipality voted on which district should have a new sports hall. The 2 finalists were Tveit and Randesund. In a final bid to win the facility, the people from Tveit launched a supporters meeting outside the council offices with about 300 attendees. Randesund supporters were also there numbering about 10. The same day it was announced that Tveit had won the bid. Therefore, a new Tveit sports hall will be built in the coming years with a budget of 20 million kr. Currently there is a small sports hall in Tveit at the Ve School which is used by various organisations.

The Tveit Skisenter is also the largest ski resort in Kristiansand. It even has ski escalators.

== Transportation ==
Bus transportation from/through Tveit
| Line | Destination |
|---|---|
| 35 | Kjevik-Brattvollshei - Kristiansand |
| 35 | Kjevik-Brattvollshei o/ Grødum - Kristiansand |
| 36 | Tveit-Grødum - Kristiansand |
| 36 | Tveit-Grødum - Ve |
| 36 | Tveit-Grødum o/ Kjevik - Rona |
| 37 | Birkeland - Kristiansand |
| 37 | Birkeland o/ Dønnestad - Kristiansand |
| 220 | Solsetta/Grødum/Dønnestad - Ve |
| FLY | Kristiansand Airport, Kjevik - Kristiansand |

== Politics ==
The 10 largest political parties in Tveit As of 2015:

Kristiansand City Council
| Party | Percent of votes | Votes |
|---|---|---|
| Labour | 26.8% | 288 |
| Conservative | 24.2% | 260 |
| Christian Democratic | 12.4% | 133 |
| Progress | 12.4% | 127 |
| Norway Democrats | 11.8% | 88 |
| Liberal | 8.2% | 38 |
| Green | 3.5% | 37 |
| Pensioners' Party | 2.7% | 33 |
| Socialist Left | 1.7% | 29 |
| The Christians | 0.9% | 10 |
| Others | 1.6% | 17 |
| Total | 99.7% | 1060 |

== Neighbourhoods ==
- Boen
- Bjørndalen
- Brattvollsheia
- Drangsholt
- Dønnestad
- Foss
- Grødum
- Hamre
- Hamreheia
- Hamresanden
- Kjevik
- Kråkebumoen
- Ryen
- Solsletta
- Topdalen
- Ve

== Media gallery ==
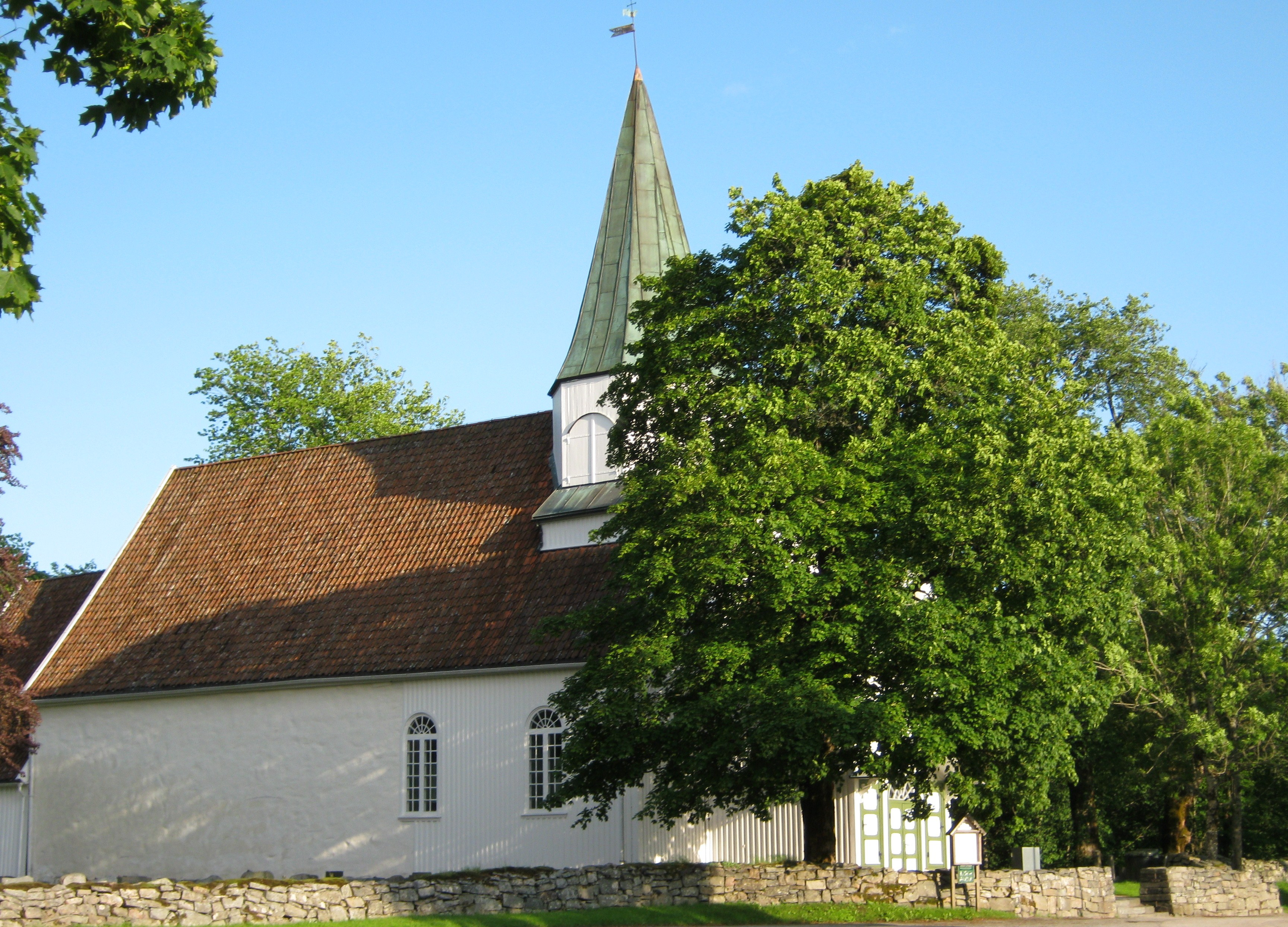
Tveit Church from the 12th century

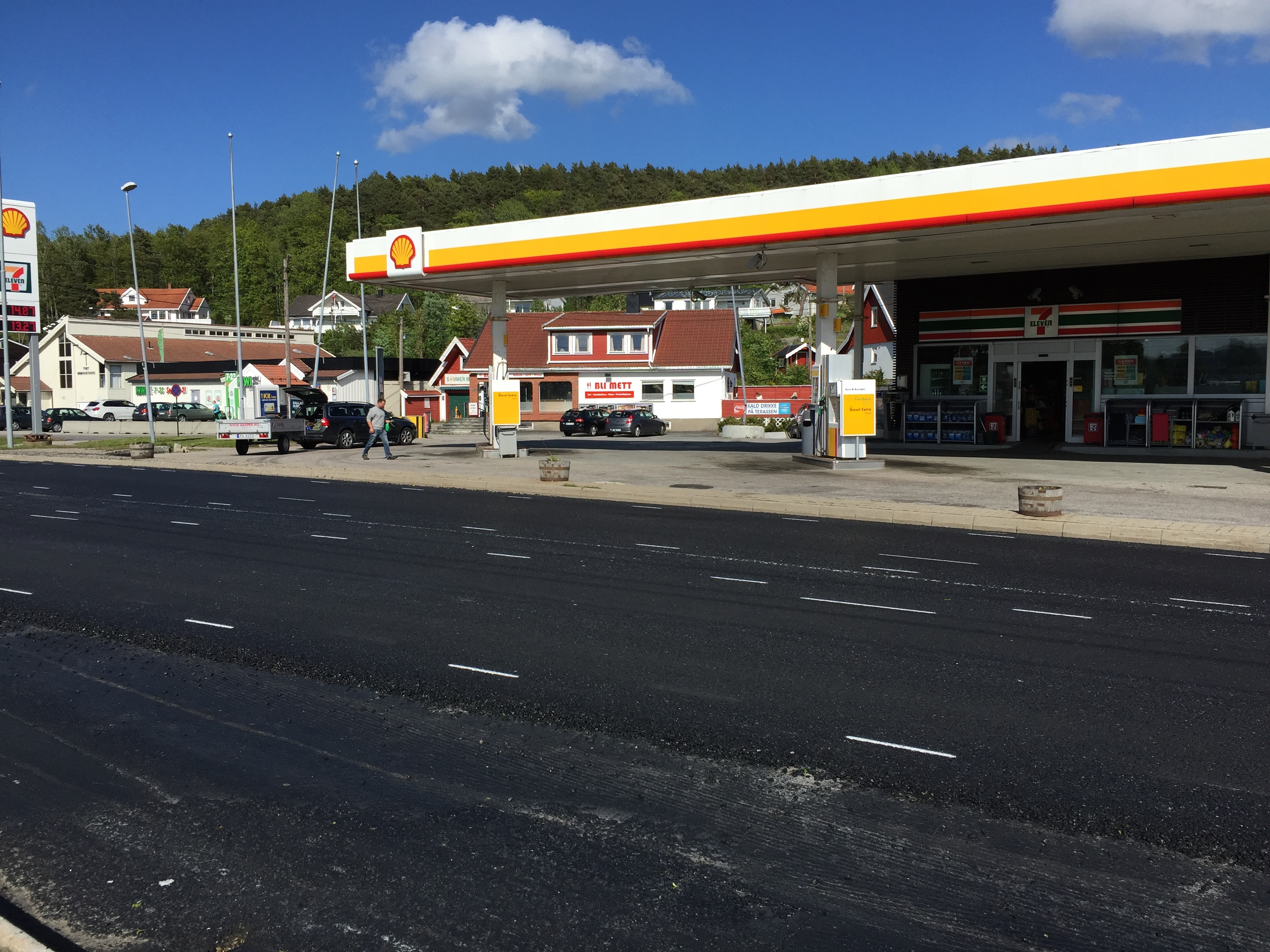
Hamre

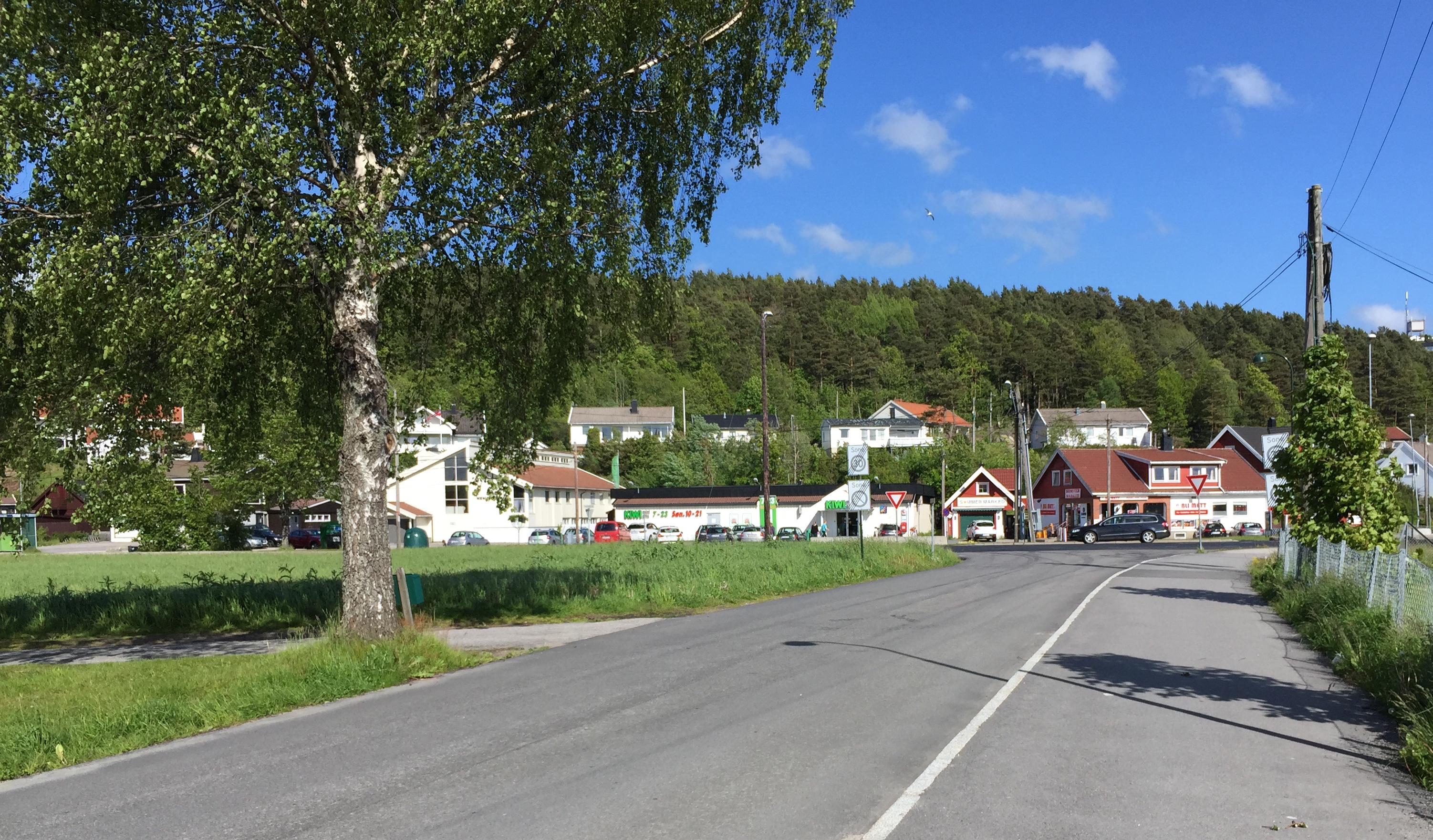
Hamreheia

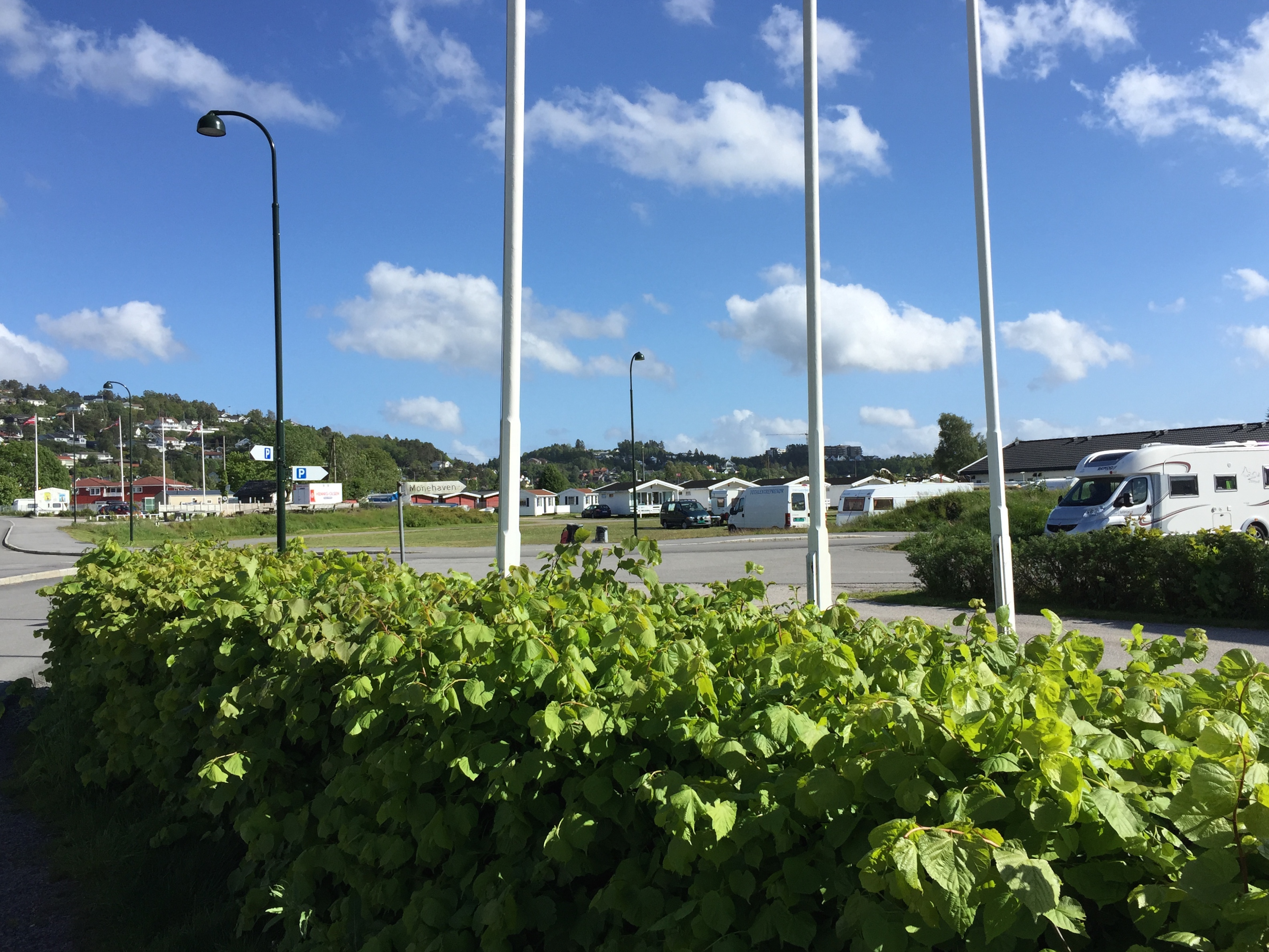
Hamreheia

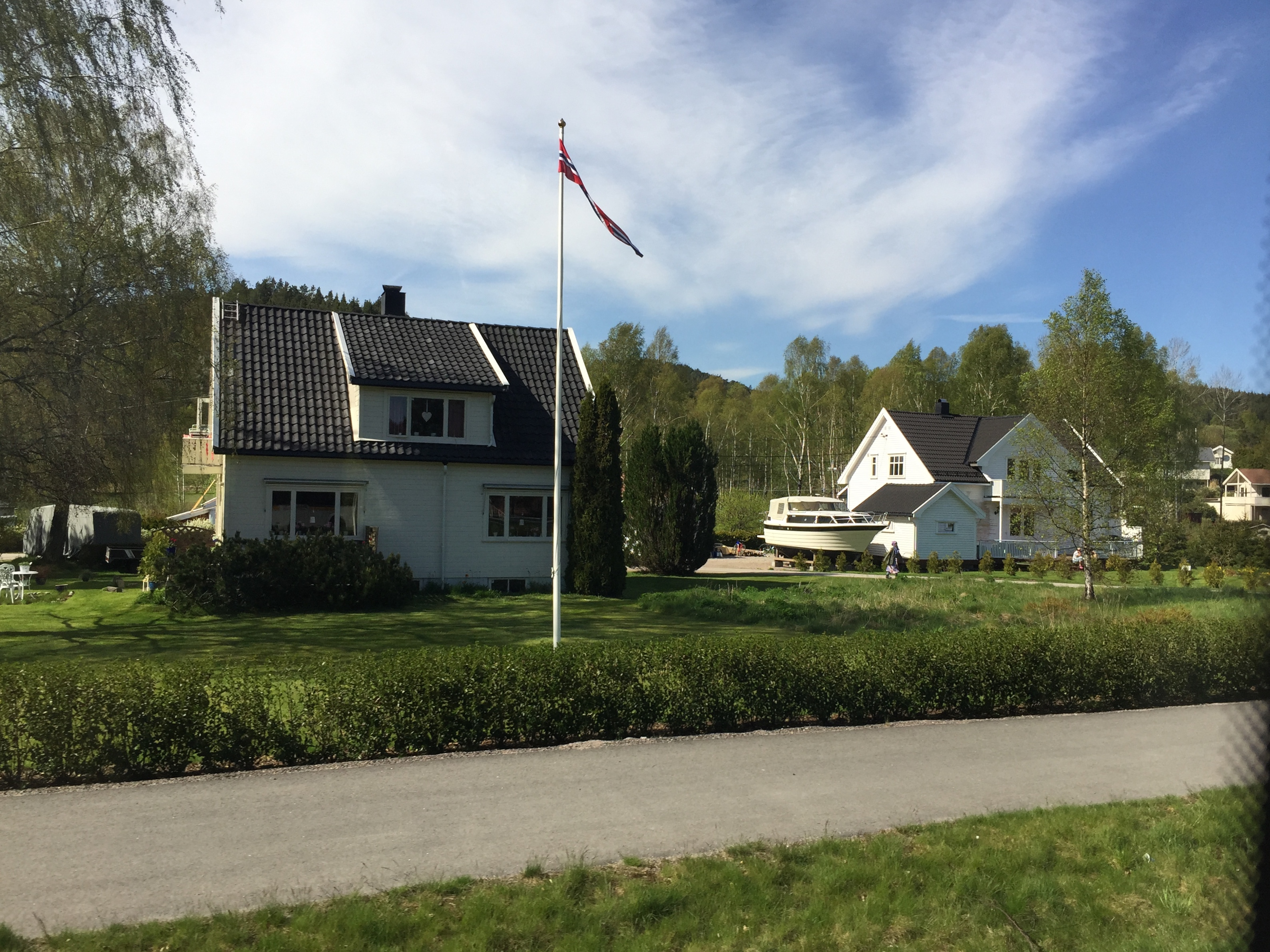
Ryen

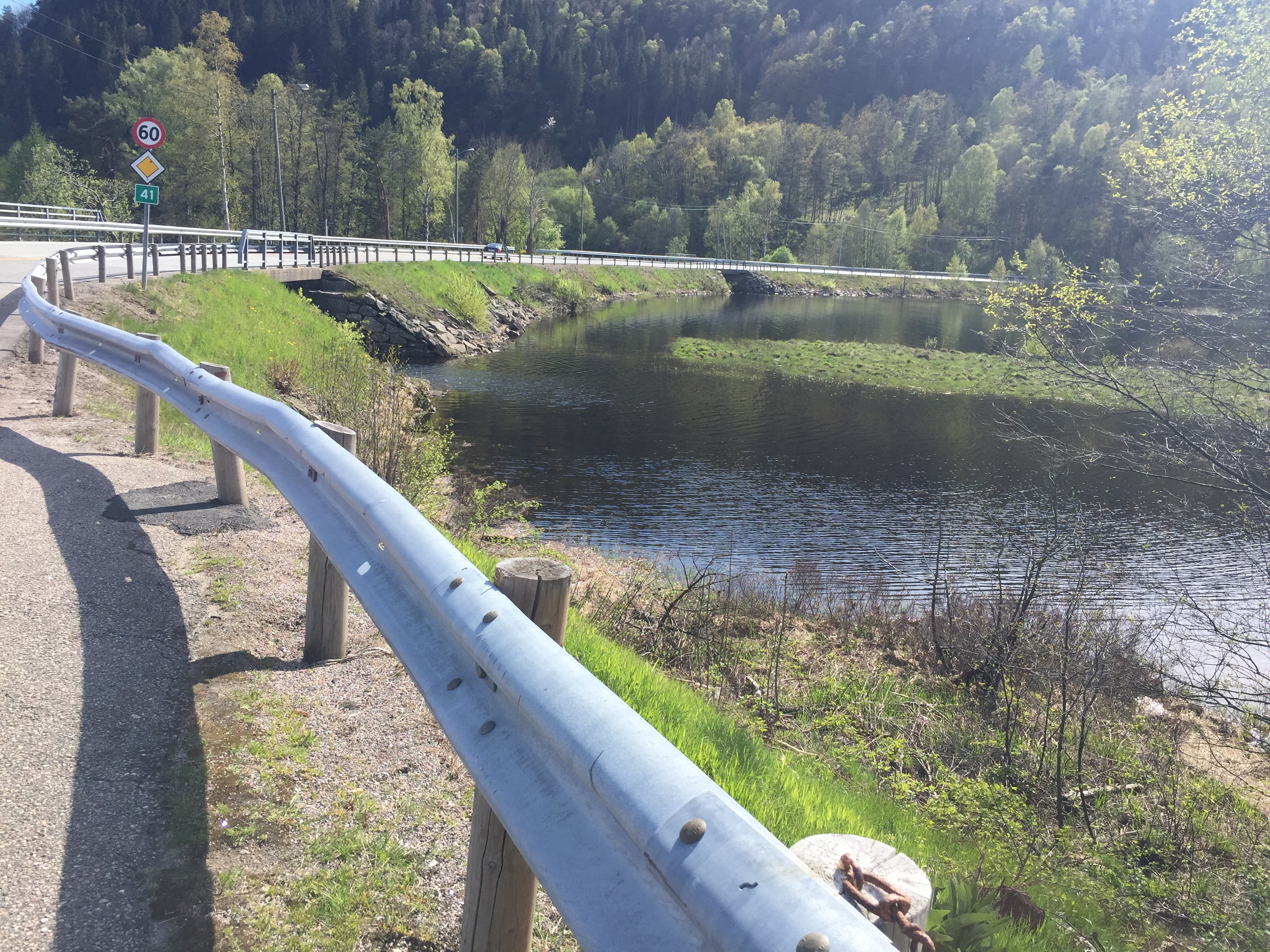
Kilåsen

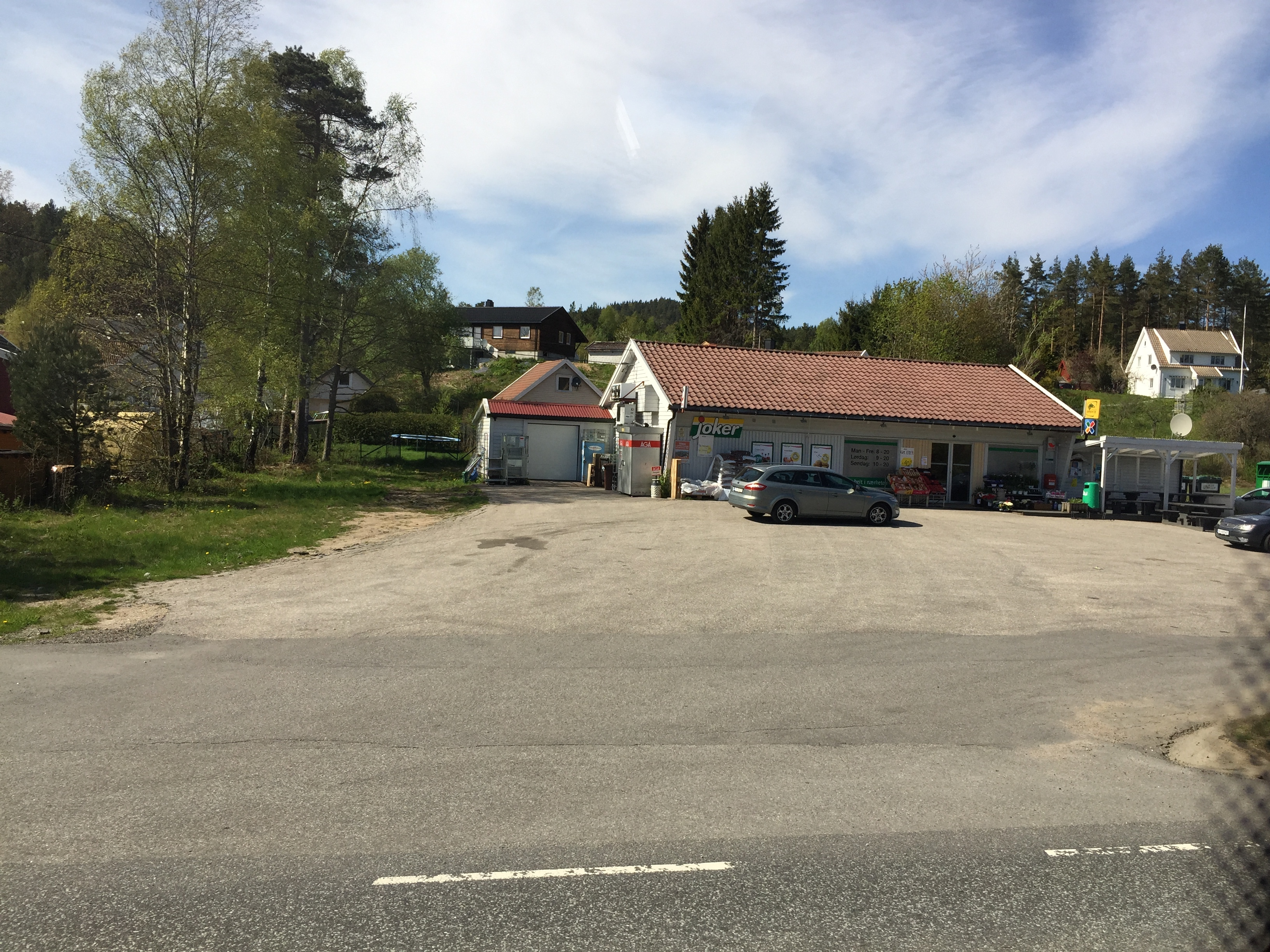
Solsletta

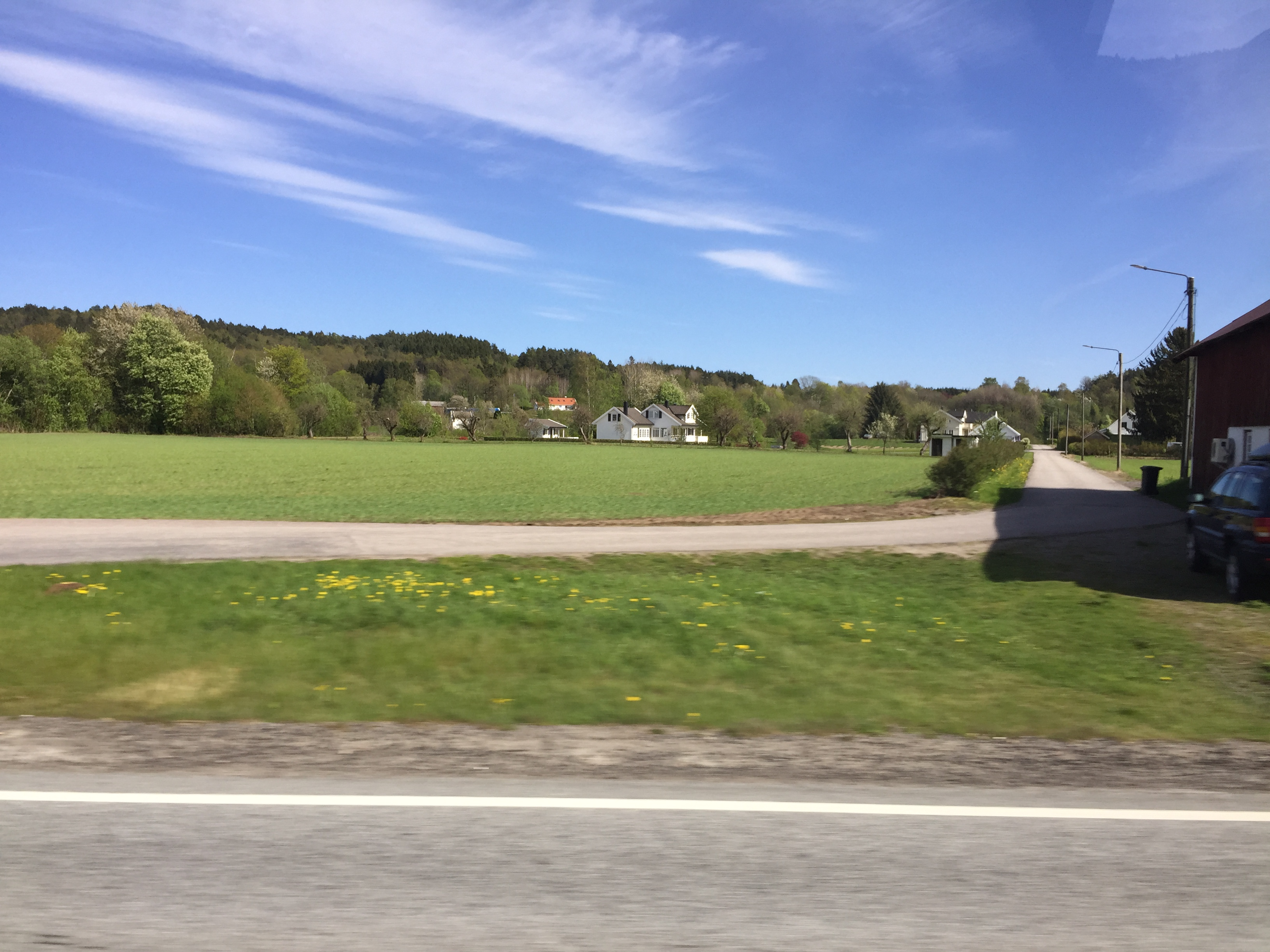
Ve

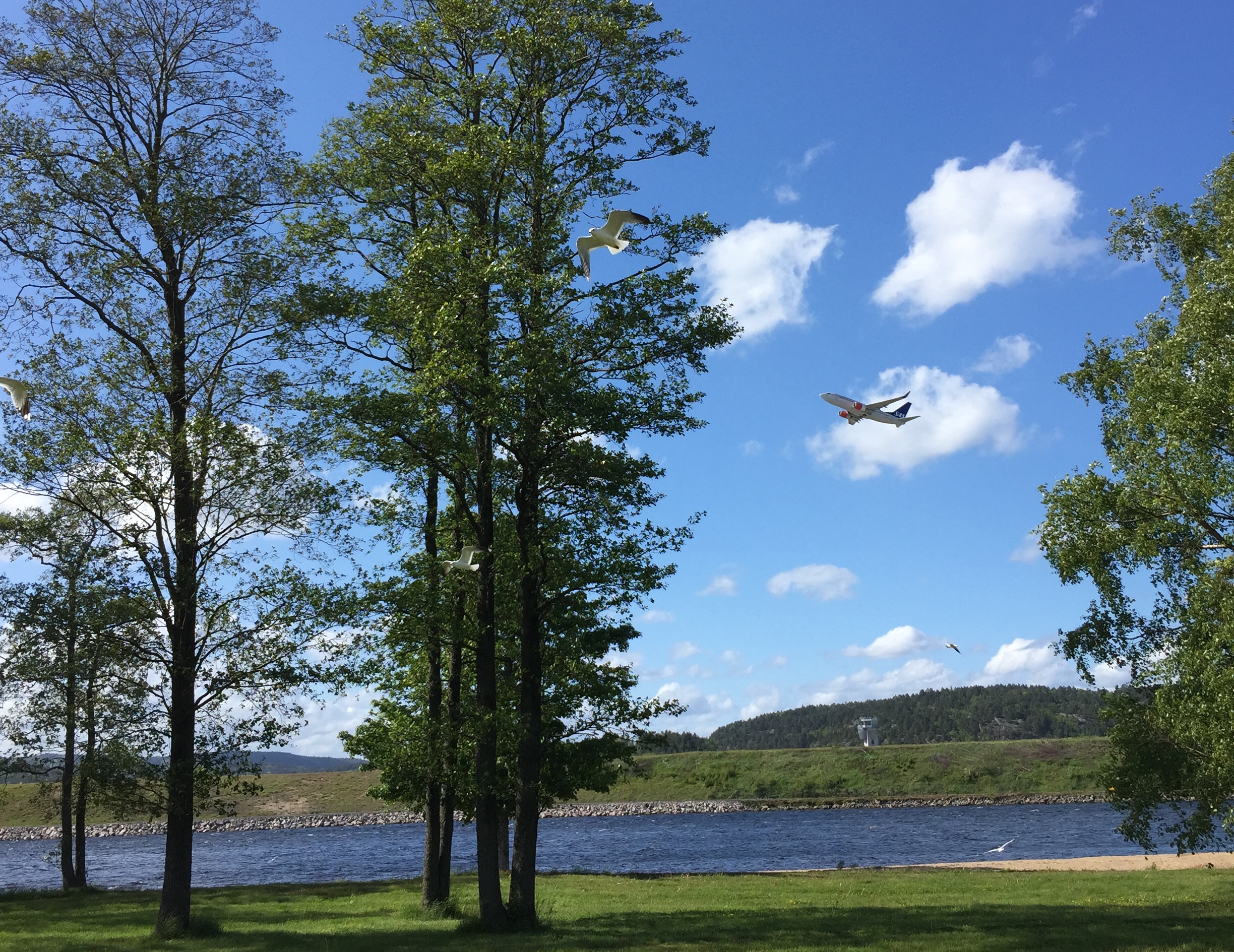
Kjevik Airport seen from Hamresanden

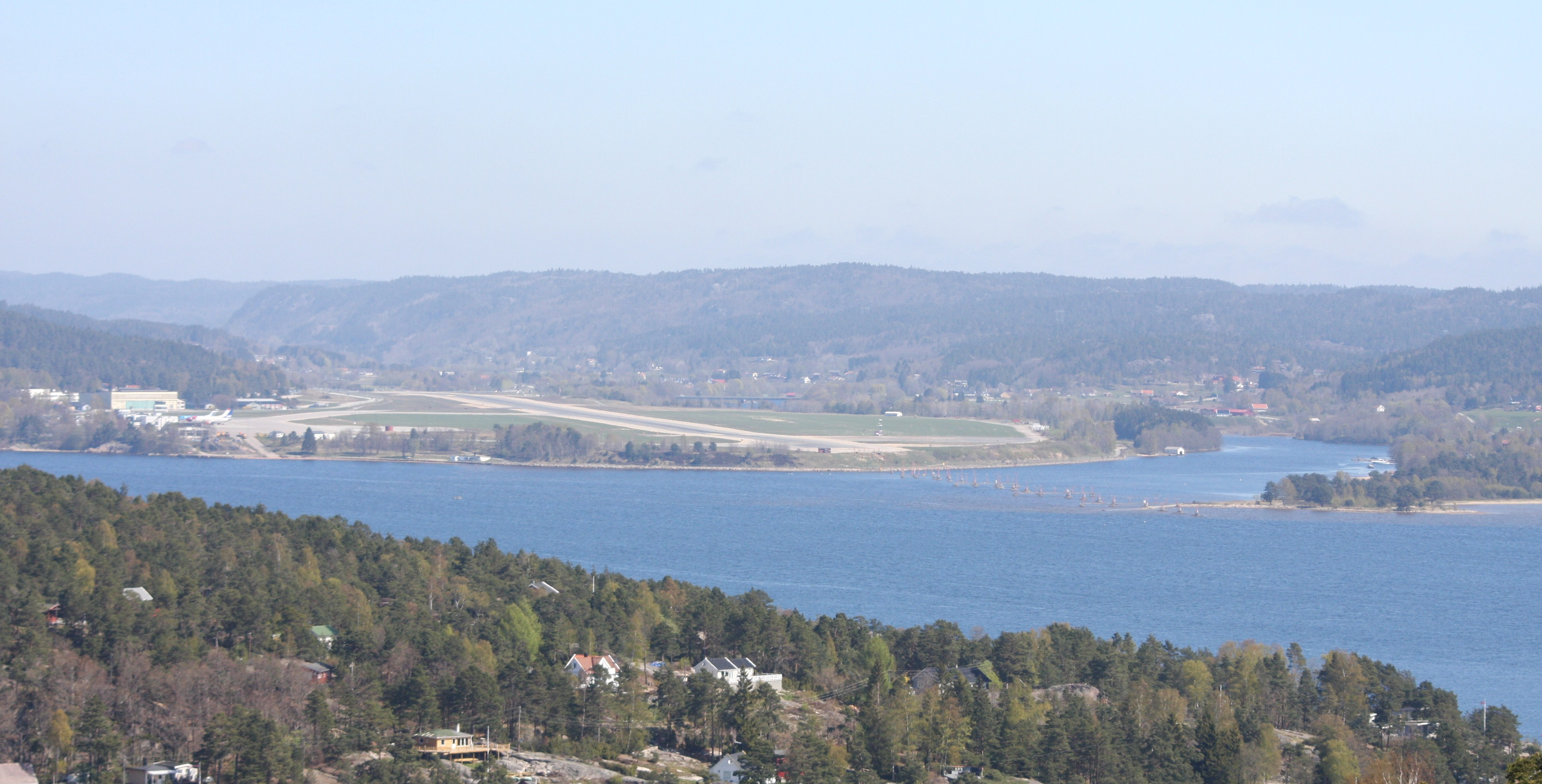
Topdalselva with Kristiansand Airport, Kjevik in the background

== Notable people ==
- Bernt Balchen (1899–1973), a Norwegian American aviator
- Marcus Gjøe Rosenkrantz, the First Minister of Norway from 1814 to 1815
- Karl Ove Knausgaard (born 1968), an author

=== Notable visitor ===
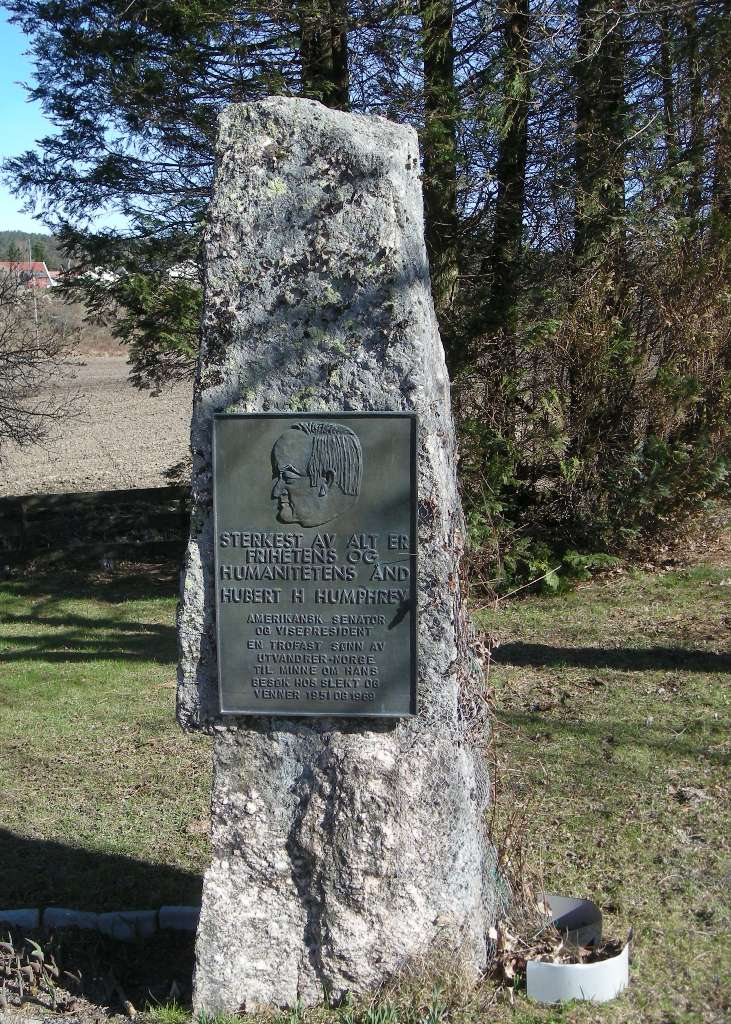
The Hubert Humphrey Memorial in Tveit.

- Former Vice President of the United States, Hubert Humphrey (1911–1978), had family ties to the area, and visited relatives here in 1951 and 1969, and is honored by a memorial stone near Tveit Church.
