= Tveite =

Tveite may refer to:

- Håvard Tveite (b. 1962), Norwegian orienteering competitor
- Marit Tveite Bystøl (b. 1981), Norwegian ski mountaineer
