= Tveit Church (Agder) =

Church in Agder, Norway

- Tveit kirke
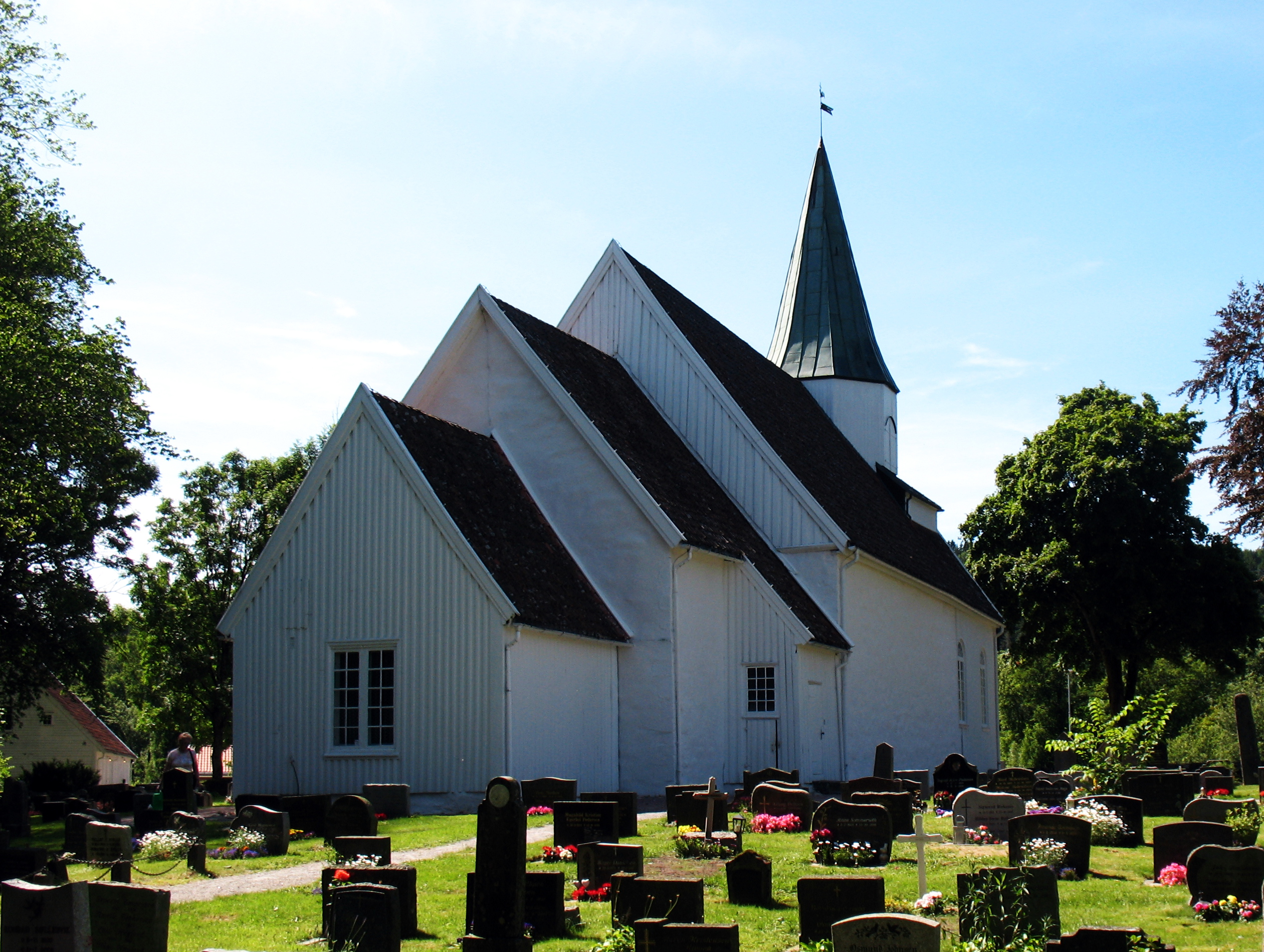
- View of the church
- Tveit Church
- 58.2283°N 08.1214°E
- Location: Kristiansand Municipality, Agder
- Country: Norway
- Denomination: Church of Norway
- Previous denomination: Catholic Church
- Churchmanship: Evangelical Lutheran

History
- Status: Parish church
- Founded: 11th century

Architecture
- Functional status: Active
- Architectural type: Long church
- Style: Romanesque
- Completed: c. 1150 (876 years ago)

Specifications
- Capacity: 350
- Materials: Stone

Administration
- Diocese: Agder og Telemark
- Deanery: Kristiansand domprosti
- Parish: Tveit
- Norwegian Cultural Heritage Site
- Type: Church
- Status: Automatically protected
- ID: 85690

Tveit Church (Norwegian: Tveit kirke) is a parish church of the Church of Norway in Kristiansand Municipality in Agder county, Norway. It is located on the banks of the Tovdalselva, just outside the village of Ryen in the district of Tveit in the borough of Oddernes in the northeastern part of the city of Kristiansand. It is the church for the Tveit parish which is part of the Kristiansand domprosti (arch-deanery) in the Diocese of Agder og Telemark. The white, stone church was built in a long church design around the year 1150 using plans drawn up by an unknown architect. The church seats about 350 people. The church is surrounded by a cemetery. The historic structure is protected by law.

== History ==
The earliest existing historical records of the church date back to the year 1379, but the church was likely built between the years 1050 and 1070. It is possible that there was a wooden stave church on the site prior to the construction of the stone building. The Romanesque stone church originally had a rectangular shape. The baptismal font in sandstone dated from 1250 to 1350. The Madonna figure is believed to have been made in the 13th century. The baroque altarpiece is dated to around the year 1650.

In 1814, this church served as an election church (Norwegian: valgkirke). Together with more than 300 other parish churches across Norway, it was a polling station for elections to the 1814 Norwegian Constituent Assembly which wrote the Constitution of Norway. This was Norway's first national elections. Each church parish was a constituency that elected people called "electors" who later met together in each county to elect the representatives for the assembly that was to meet at Eidsvoll Manor later that year.

Over the years there have been several additions to enlarge the church. In 1827, a sacristy was built on the north side of the chancel. In 1831, the main entrance with a tower was added and the old entry porch was incorporated into the nave. In 1867, a wooden addition to the west was added to enlarge the nave even more and provide a new entry porch.

== Media gallery ==
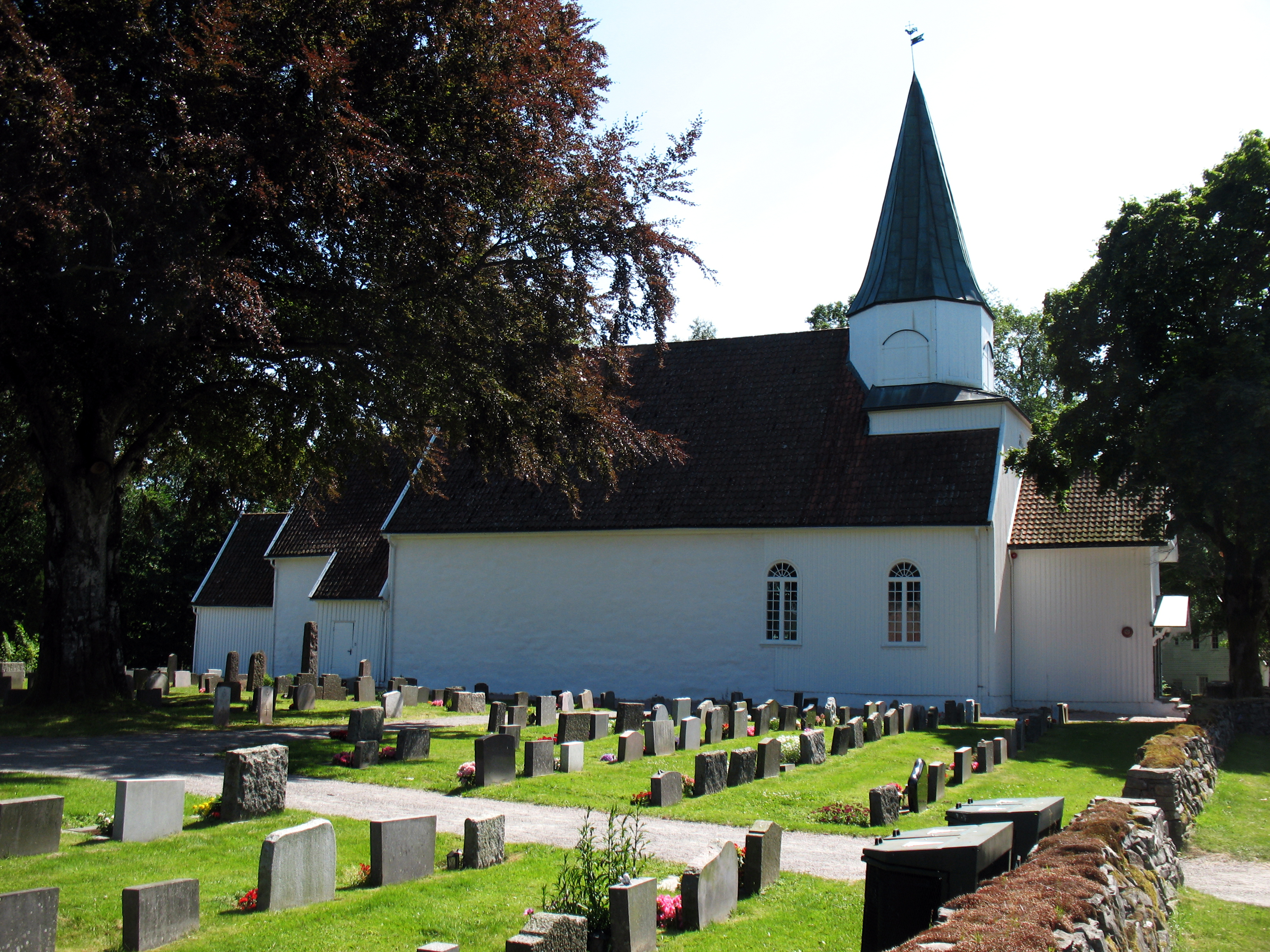
Exterior view

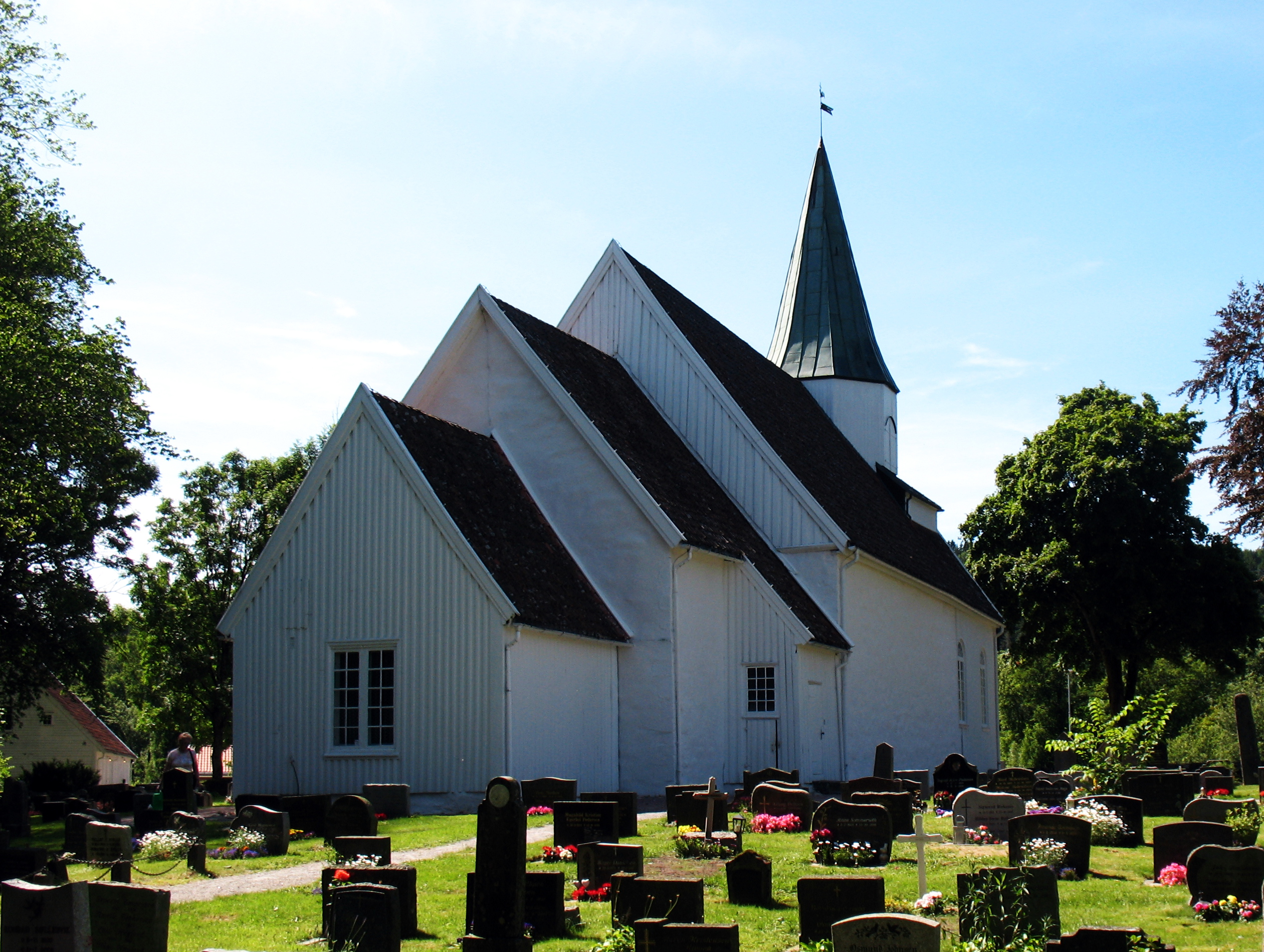
Side view

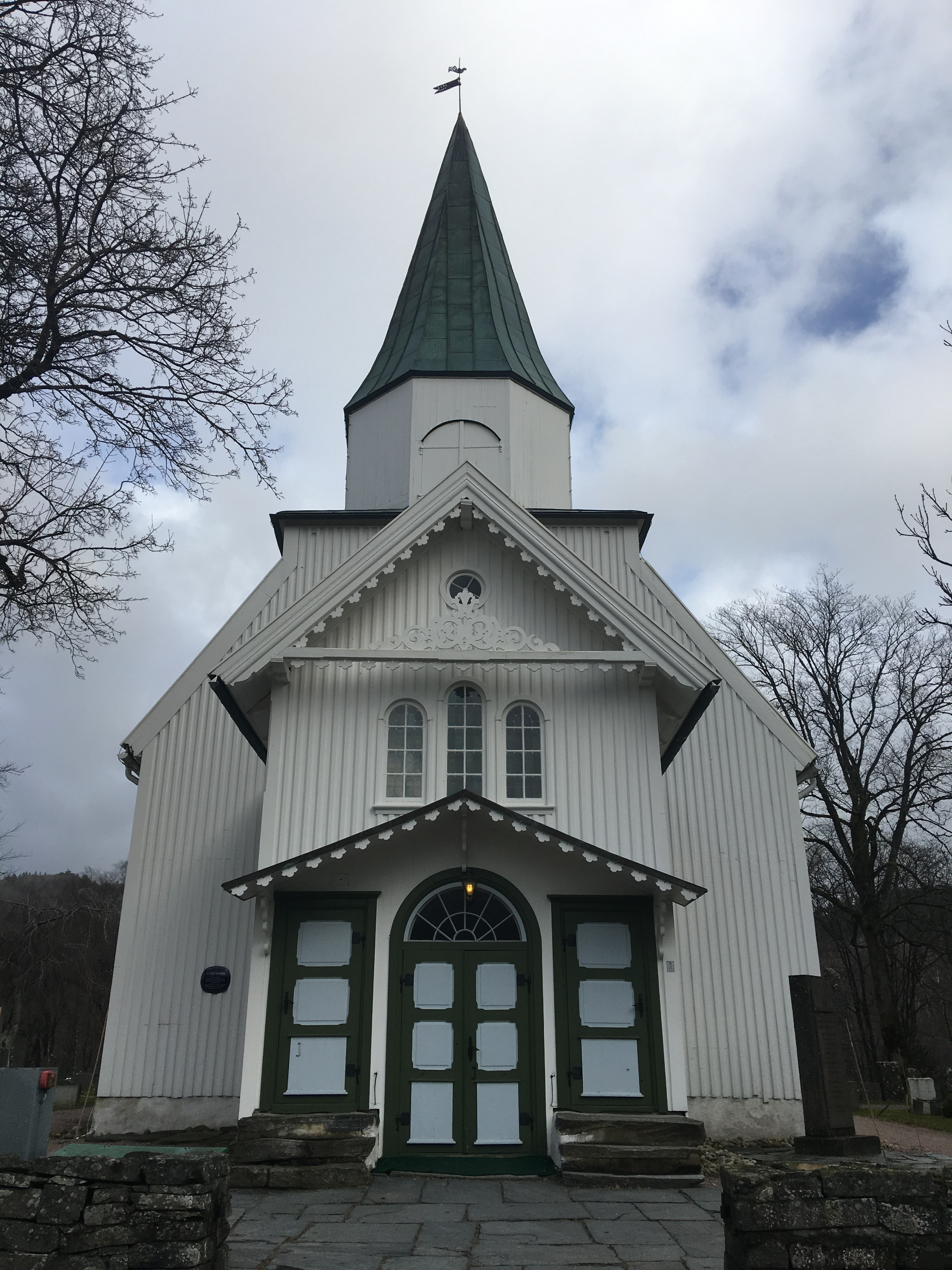
Entrance to the church

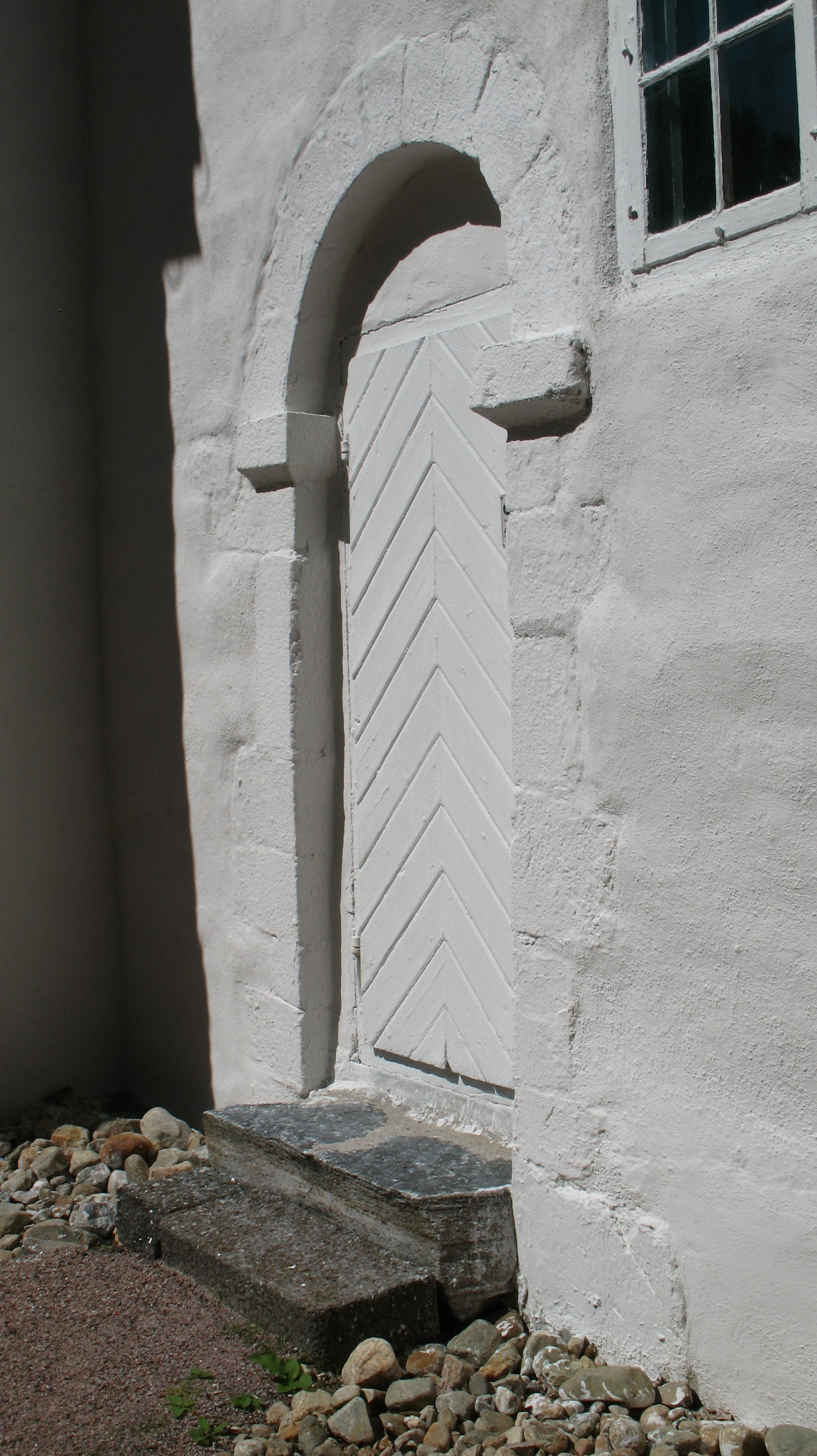
Entrance to the choir

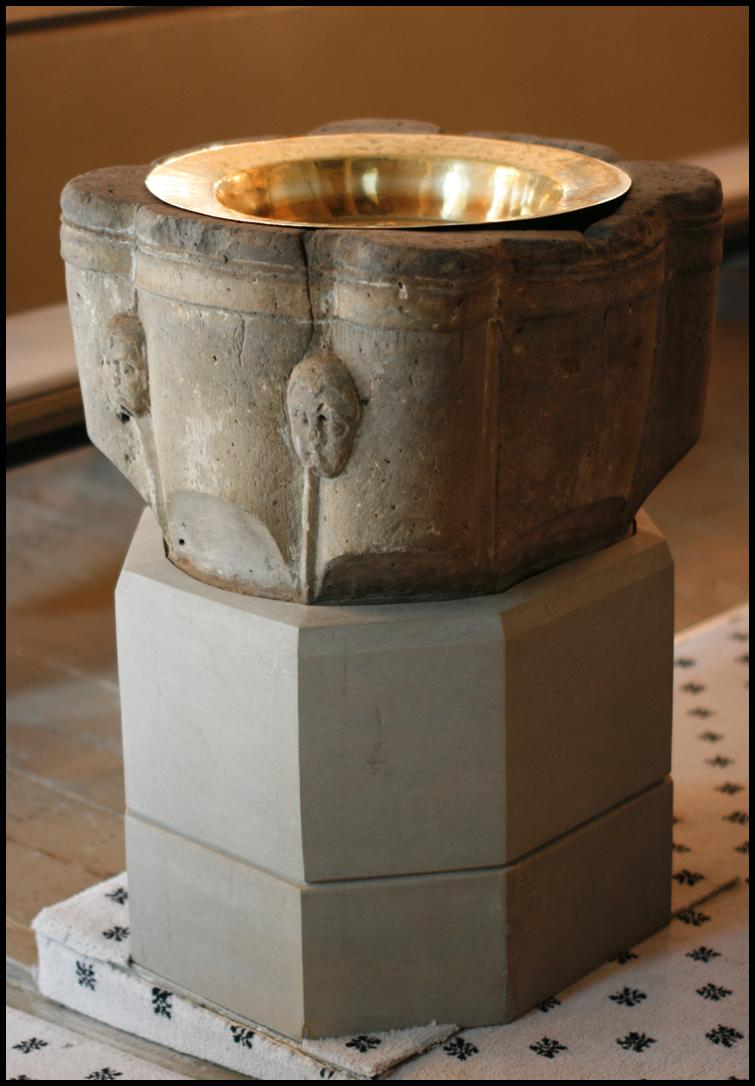
Baptismal font

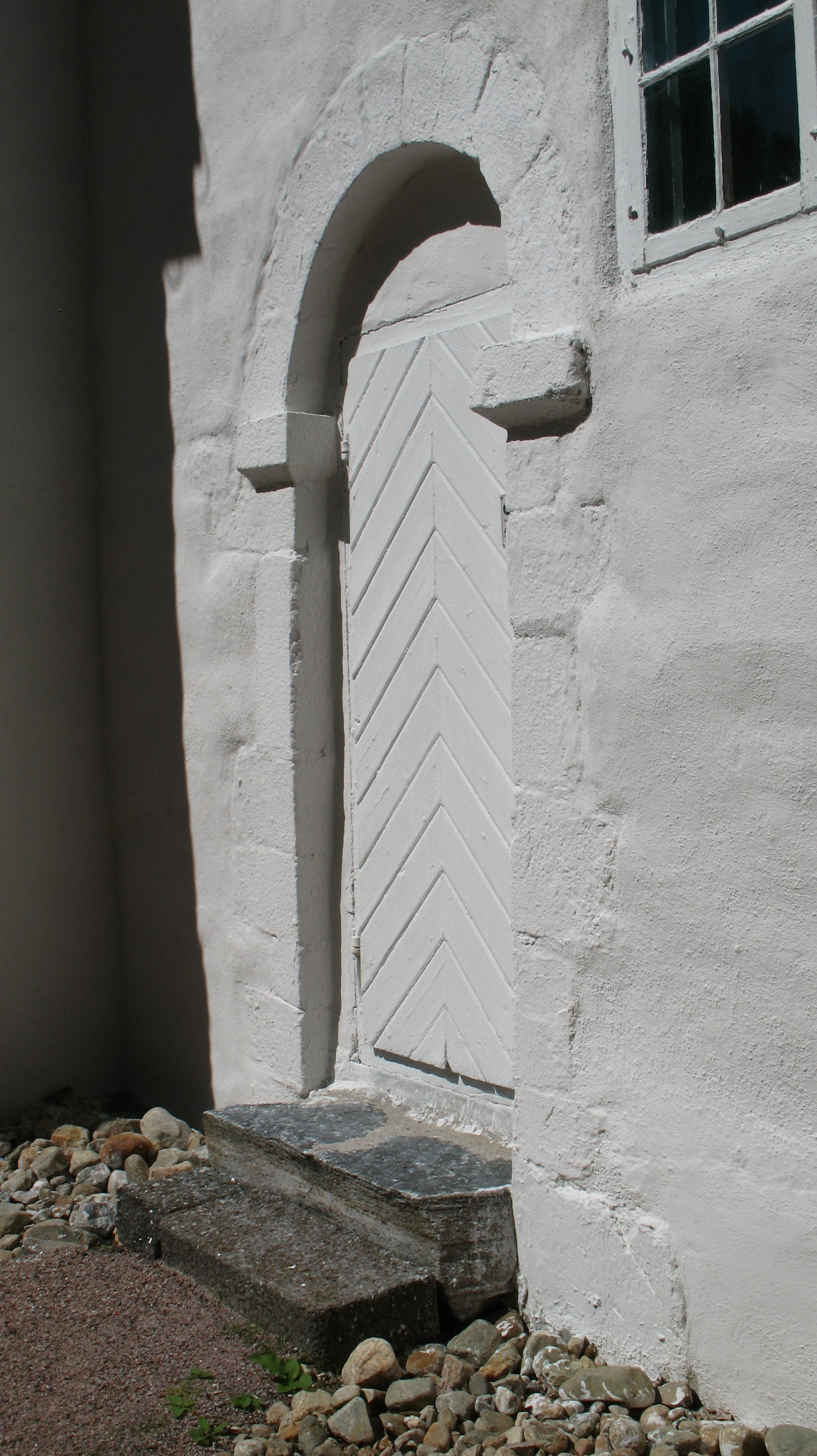
Side door

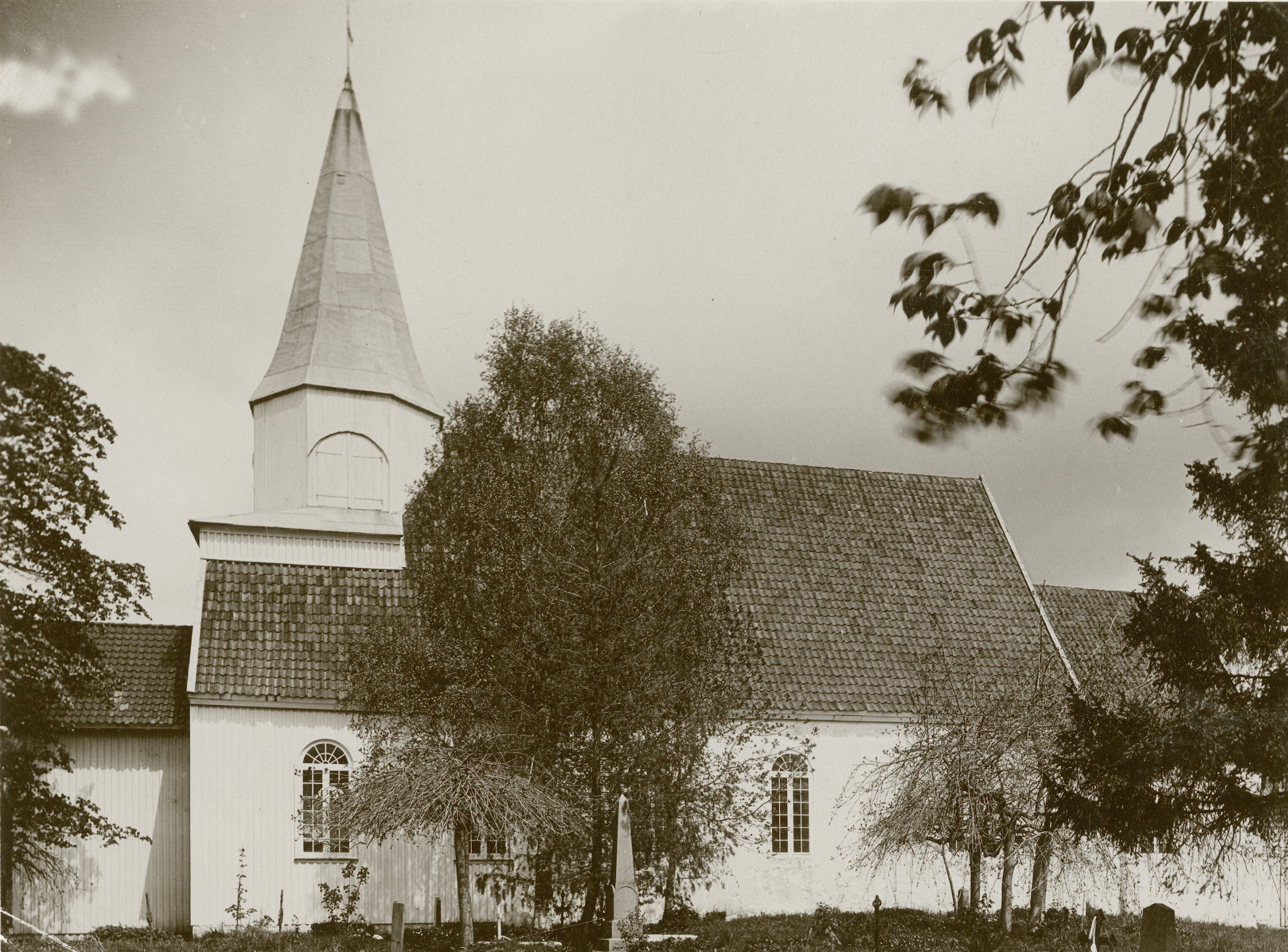
View in 1900

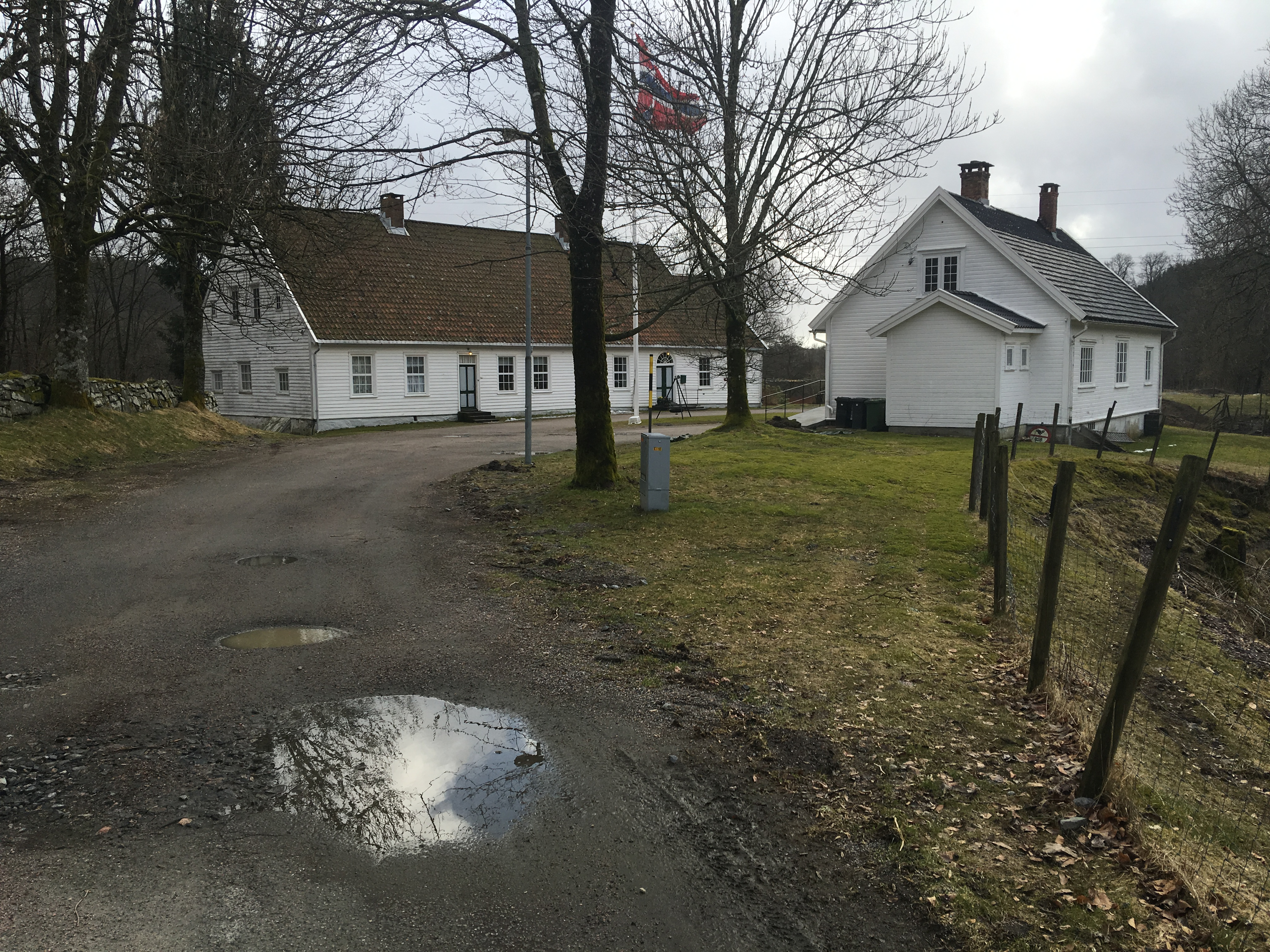
Parsonage

== See also ==
- List of churches in Agder og Telemark
