= Vågsbygd =

Borough in Kristiansand Municipality, Norway

- Borough of Kristiansand
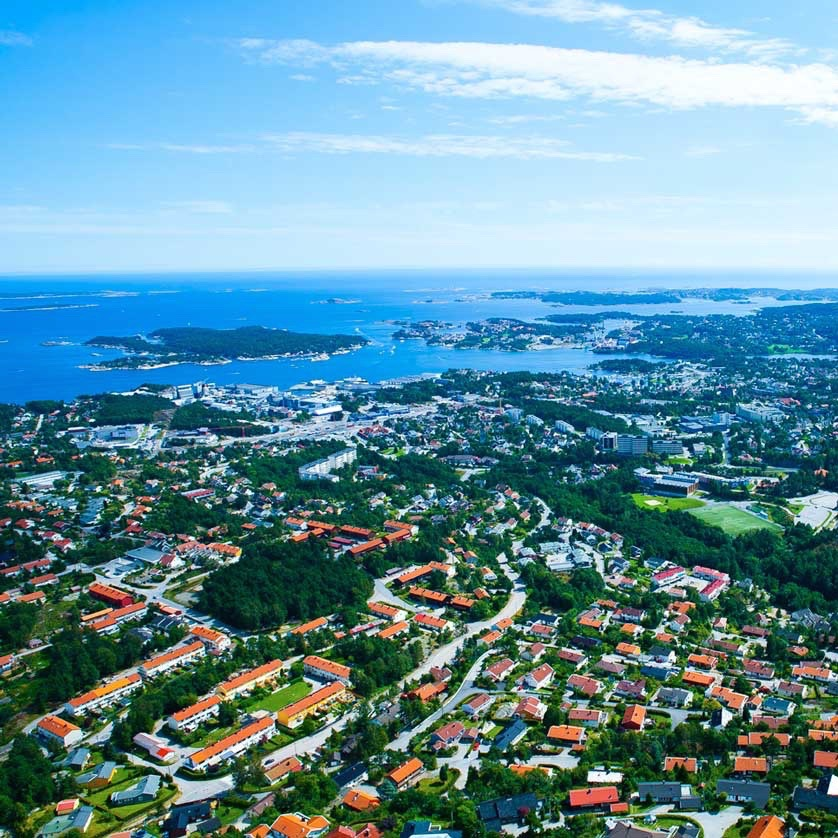
- View of the Vågsbygd from Slettheia

- Coat of arms

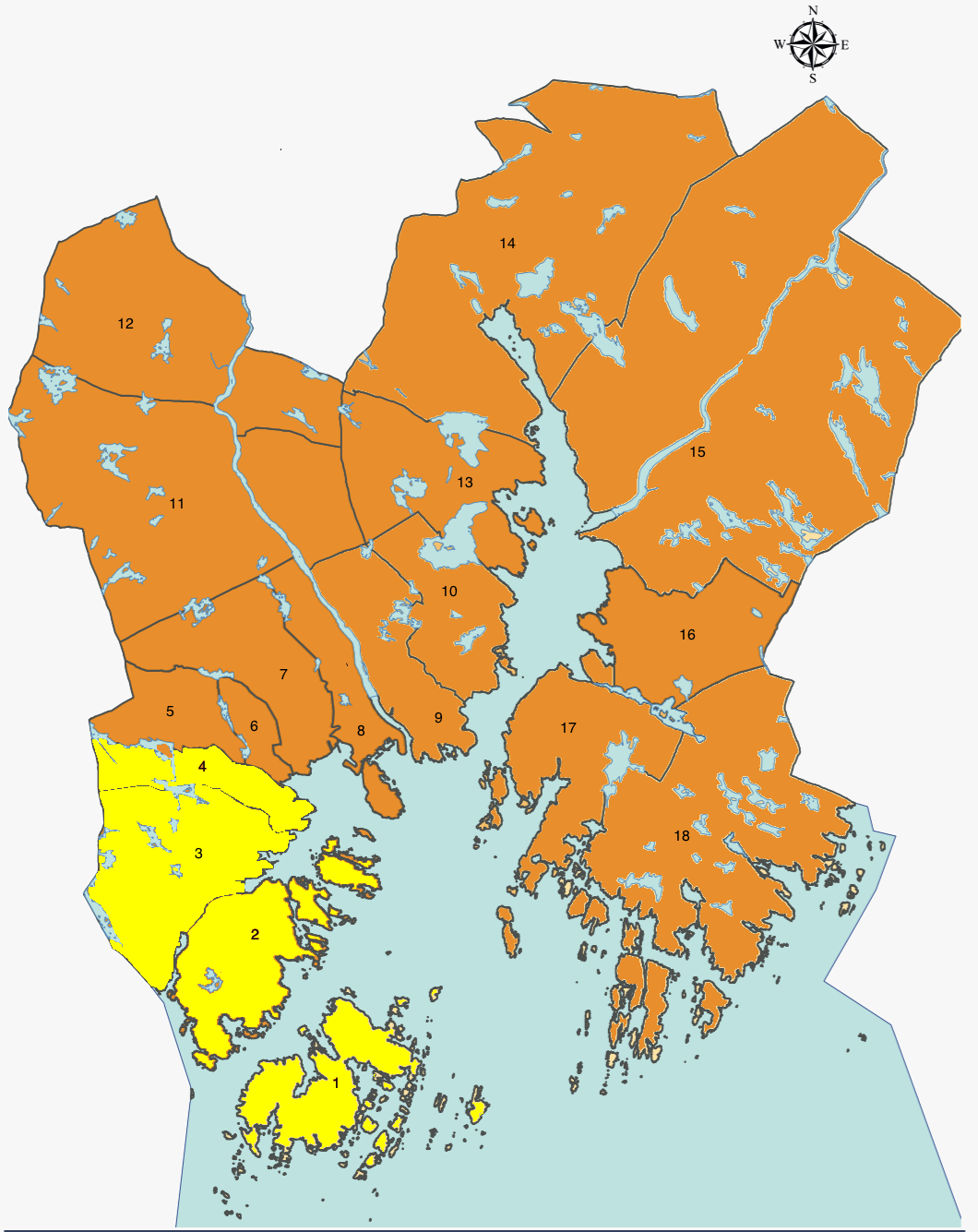
- Location of Vågsbygd, shown in yellow, in Kristiansand
- Interactive map of Vågsbygd
- Coordinates: 58.10°N 7.94°E
- Country: Norway
- Region: Southern Norway
- County: Agder
- Municipality: Kristiansand Municipality
- Elevation: 19 m (62 ft)

Population (2015)
  - Total: 36,210
- Time zone: UTC+01:00 (CET)
  - Summer (DST): UTC+02:00 (CEST)
- Post Code prefix: 462*, 467*

Vågsbygd is a borough and district in the city of Kristiansand which lies in Kristiansand Municipality in Agder county, Norway. It is the largest borough and district in Kristiansand. Until 1965, Vågsbygd was a part of Oddernes Municipality. The borough includes the districts of Flekkerøy, Voiebyen, Vågsbygd/Augland, and Slettheia. The Kristiansand Cannon Museum on Kroodden is an authentic fortress from World War II.

The Vågsbygd district includes many islands including Bragdøya, Andøya, Fredriksholm, and Flekkerøya (with Christiansø Fortress).

== Attractions ==
=== Centre for the Protection of Vessels ===
On Andøya in Vågsbygd is the Bredalsholmen Shipyard and Preservation Centre, a Centre for protection of vessels at the former Bredalsholmen yard. Bredalsholmen Shipyard and Preservation Centre is often used for maintenance of museum ships and cherish worthy coastal culture, and a drydock with considerable capacity.

=== Cannon Museum ===
Kristiansand Cannon Museum was built by the German occupational forces during World War II. This is one of Norway's best preserved cannon plants from the war, complete with 45 mm cannon turrets, ammunition and charging facilities, workshops, offices and barracks.

== Demographics and population ==
Vågsbygd borough is divided into four districts: Flekkerøy, Voiebyen, Slettheia, and Vågsbygd.

List of districts and population
Nr	District	Population	Map
1	Vågsbygd (Centrum)	22,000	
2	Voiebyen	6,000	
3	Slettheia	4,500	
4	Flekkerøy	3,500	

=== Neighborhoods ===
Neighborhoods in Vågsbygd:

Vågsbygd	Voiebyen	Slettheia	Flekkerøy
Augeland terrasse; Augelandslia; Kjerrheia; Kjos Haveby nord; Kjos Haveby sør; Nordtjønnåsen; Skyllingsheia; Vågsbygd sentrum; Vågsbygd søndre; Åsane	Andøya; Bråvann; Kroodden; Møvik; Skutevik; Voiebyen nordvest; Voiebyen nordøst; Voiebyen sørvest; Voiebyen sørøst	Fiskåtangen; Gislemyr; Kartheia; Nedre Slettheia; Slettheia sør; Slettheitoppen vest; Slettheitoppen øst; Slettheiveien; Øvre Slettheia	Kjære/Andås; Lindebø/Skålevik; Mæbø/Høyfjellet

==== Vågsbygd sentrum ====
Vågsbygd sentrum
- Neighborhood in Kristiansand
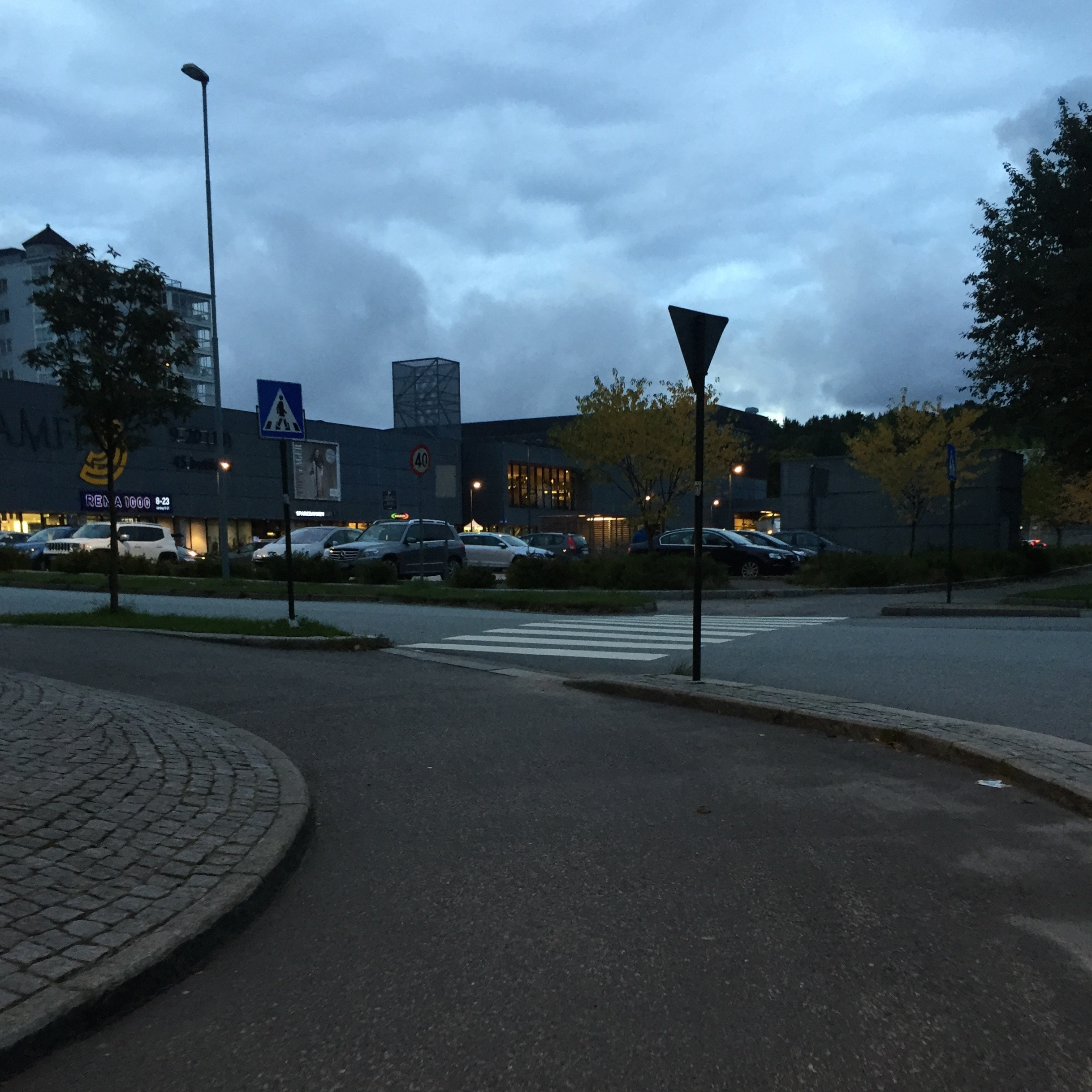
- View of the neighborhood
- Interactive map of Vågsbygd sentrum
- Coordinates: 58.124°N 7.955°E
- Country: Norway
- County: Agder
- Municipality: Kristiansand Municipality
- Borough: Vågsbygd
- District: Vågsbygd
- Time zone: UTC+01:00 (CET)
  - Summer (DST): UTC+02:00 (CEST)
- Postal code: 4621
- Area code: 38

Vågsbygd sentrum is a neighbourhood in the city of Kristiansand in Agder county, Norway. It is the centrum of the borough of Vågsbygd. Vågsbygd sentrum is north of the neighborhood of Auglandskollen, south of Kjerrheia, east of Bjørklia, and west of Skyllingsheia.

Vågsbygd Mall is located here along with Vågsbygd High School, Fiskå Junior High, and Vågsbygd Elementary School. Vågsbygd Church is located here as well near the Vågsbygdtunet retirement home and a bus terminal for Nettbuss. Vågsbygd sentrum mostly consist of apartments.

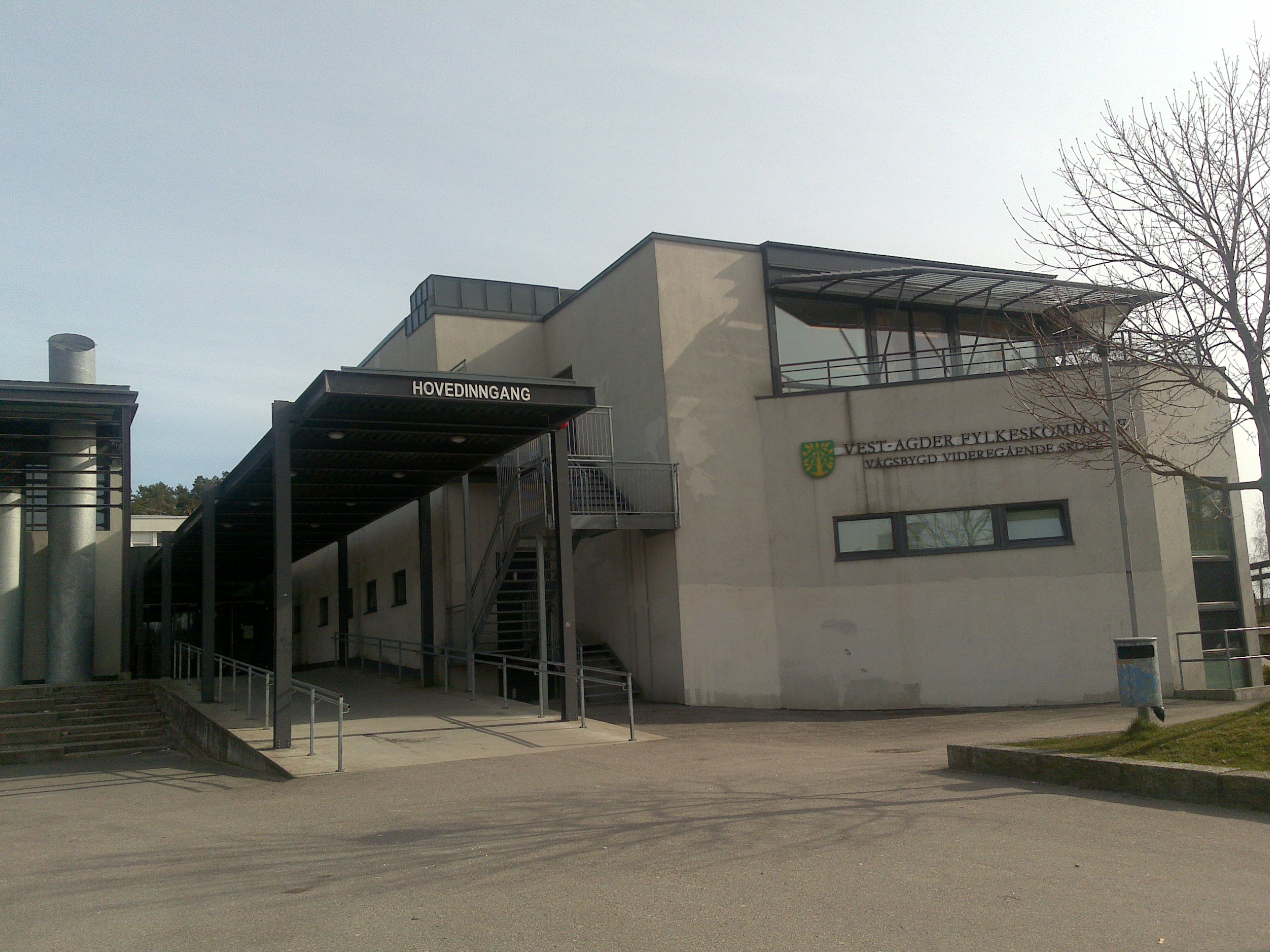
Vågsbygd High School

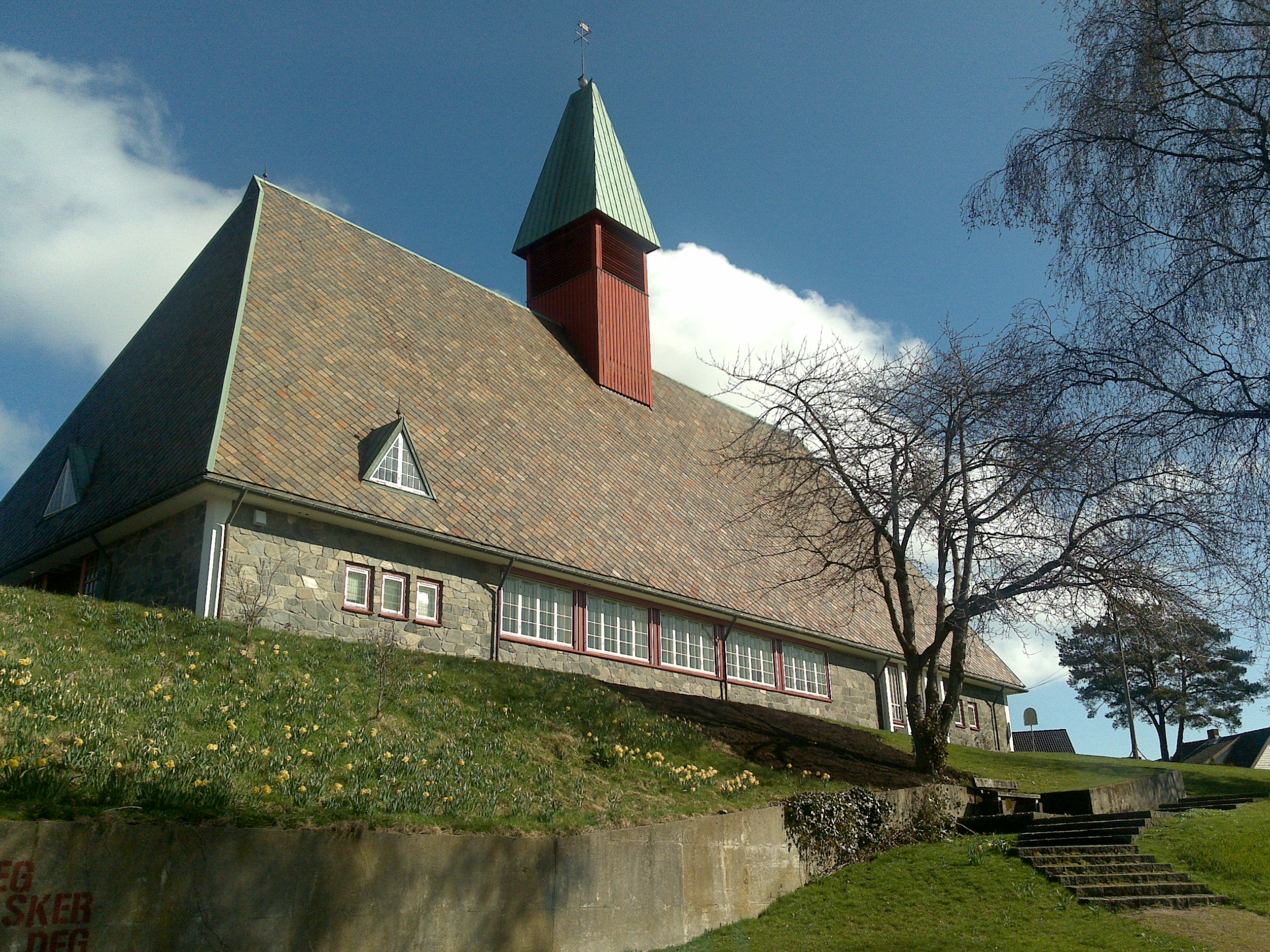
Vågsbygd Church

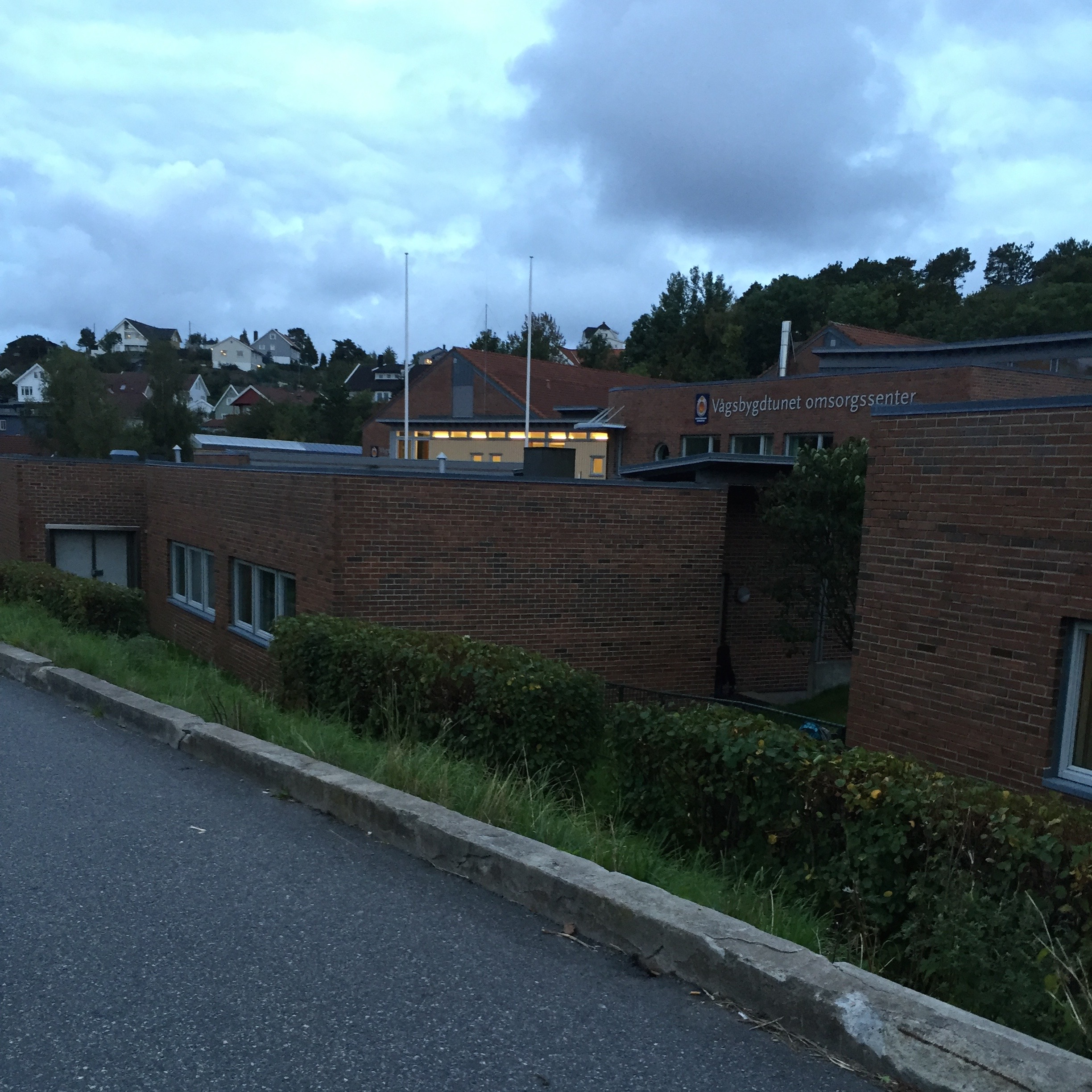
Vågsbygdtunet Retirement Home

===== Transportation =====
Roads through Vågsbygd centrum:
Road	Stretch
Fv456	Hannevika - Søgne

Bus lines through Vågsbygd centrum
Line	Destinations
M1	Flekkerøy - Sørlandsparken Dyreparken - IKEA
M1	Flekkerøy - Kvadraturen
M2	Voiebyen - Hånes
M2	Voiebyen - Hånes - Lauvåsen
M2	Voiebyen - Hånes / Kjevik - Tveit
M2	Voiebyen - Kvadraturen
M3	Vågsbygd sentrum - Slettheia - Søm
05	Andøya - Vågsbygd sentrum
05	Andøya - Kvadraturen - UiA
09	Bråvann - Vågsbygd sentrum
09	Bråvann - Kvadraturen - UiA
12	Kjos Haveby - Eg - Sykehuset
50	Søgne - Kristiansand
D2	Voiebyen - Kvadraturen - UiA
D3	Vågsbygd sentrum - Slettheia - Kvadraturen - UiA

=== Photos ===
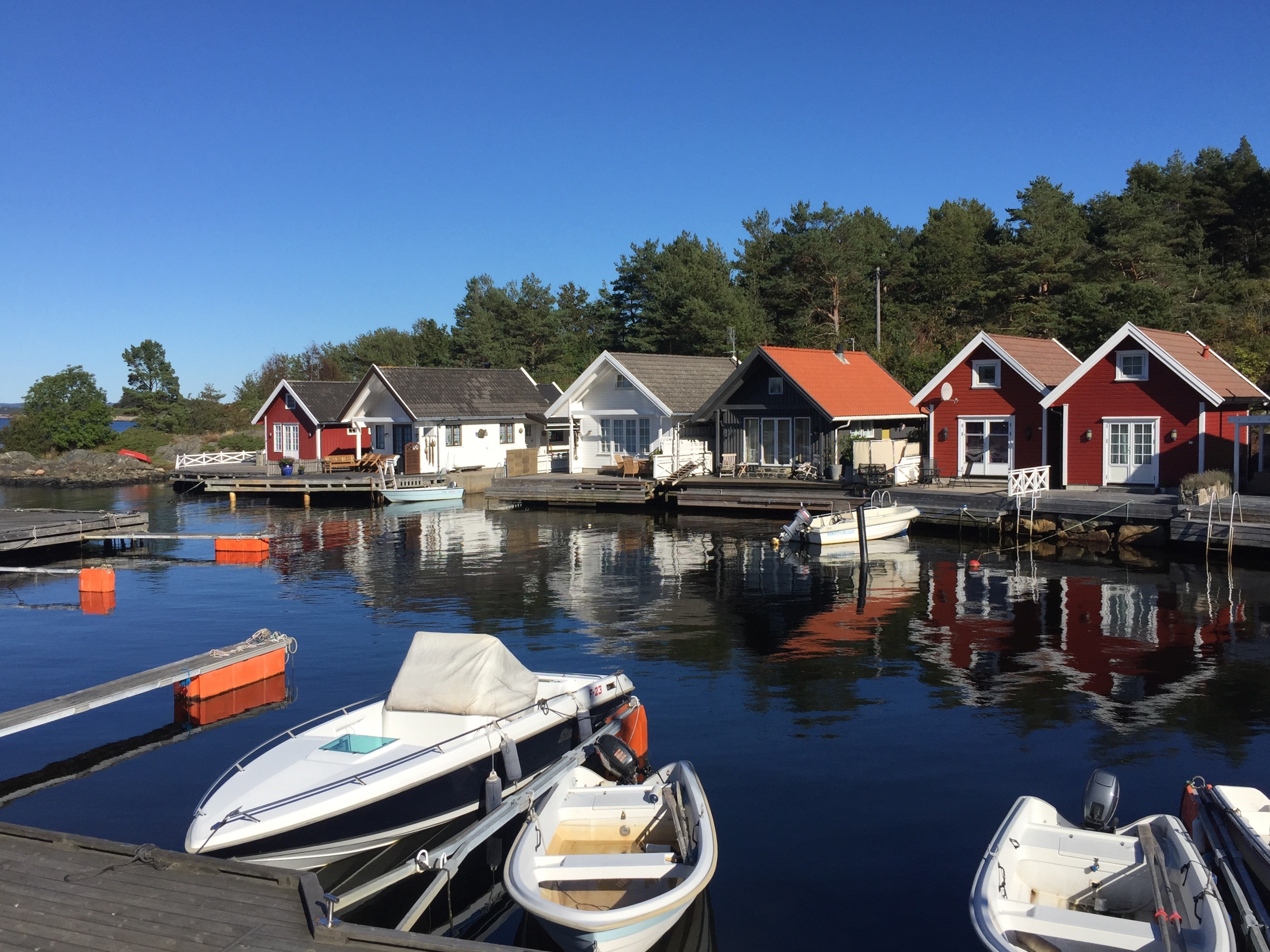
Åshavn

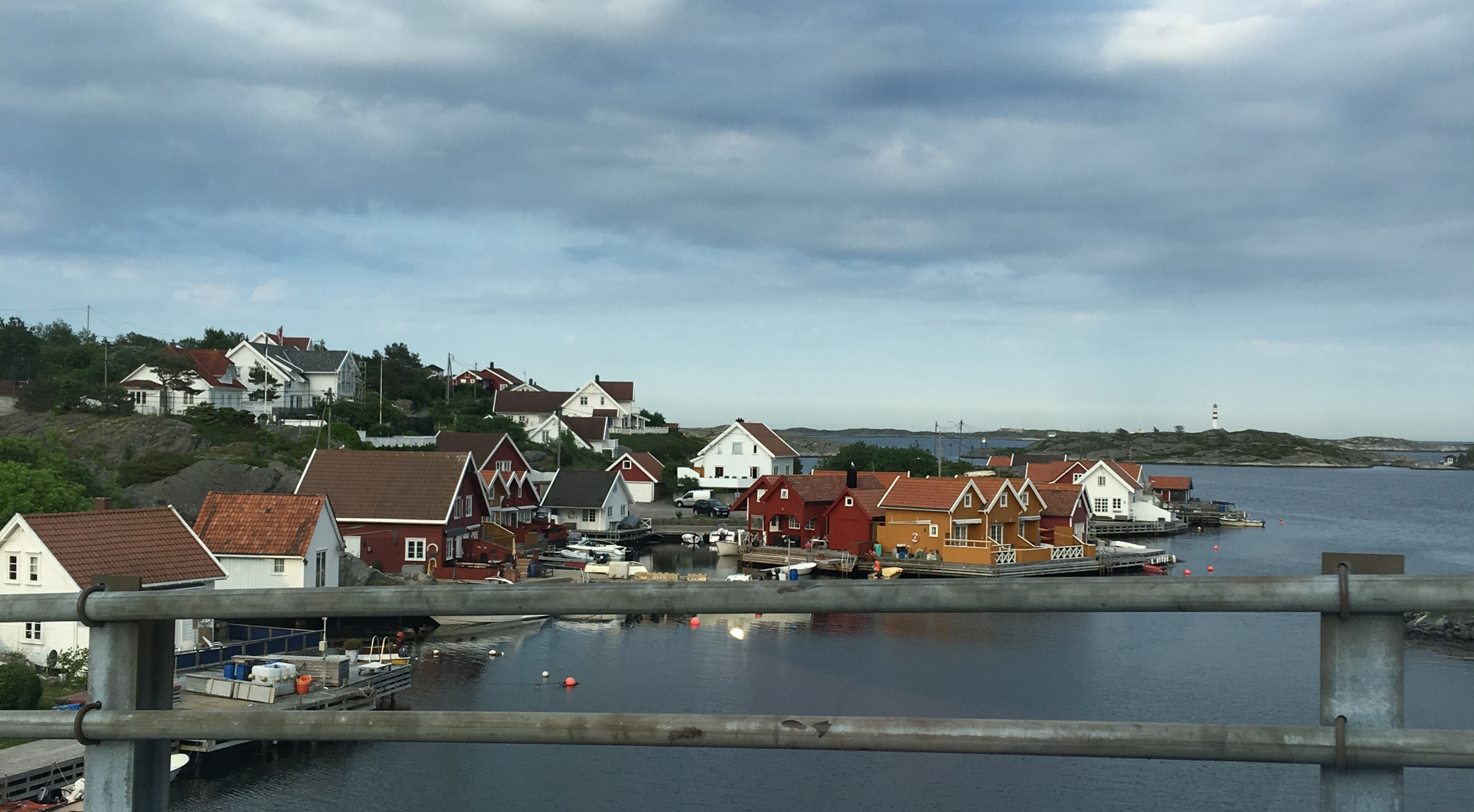
Skålevik

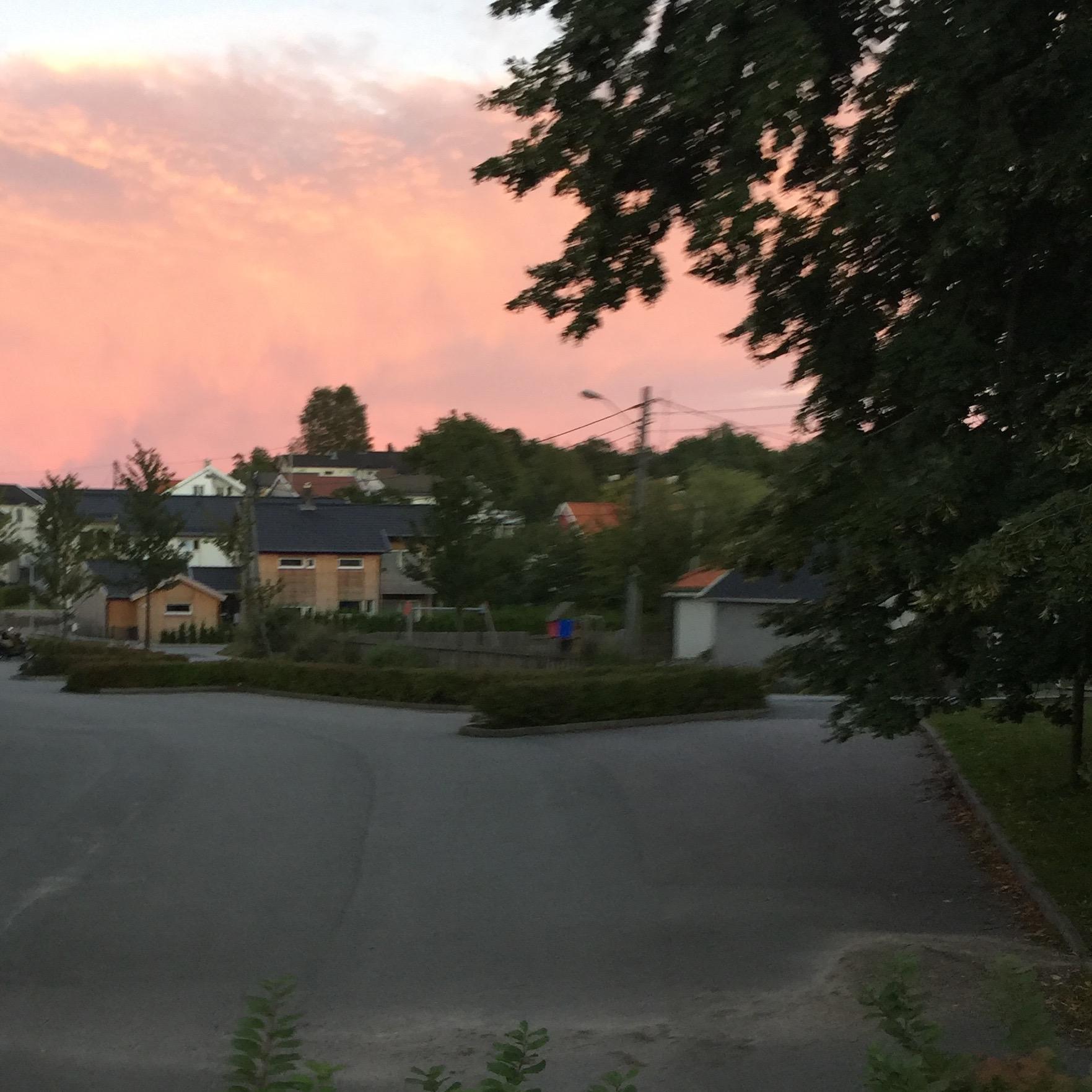
Møvik

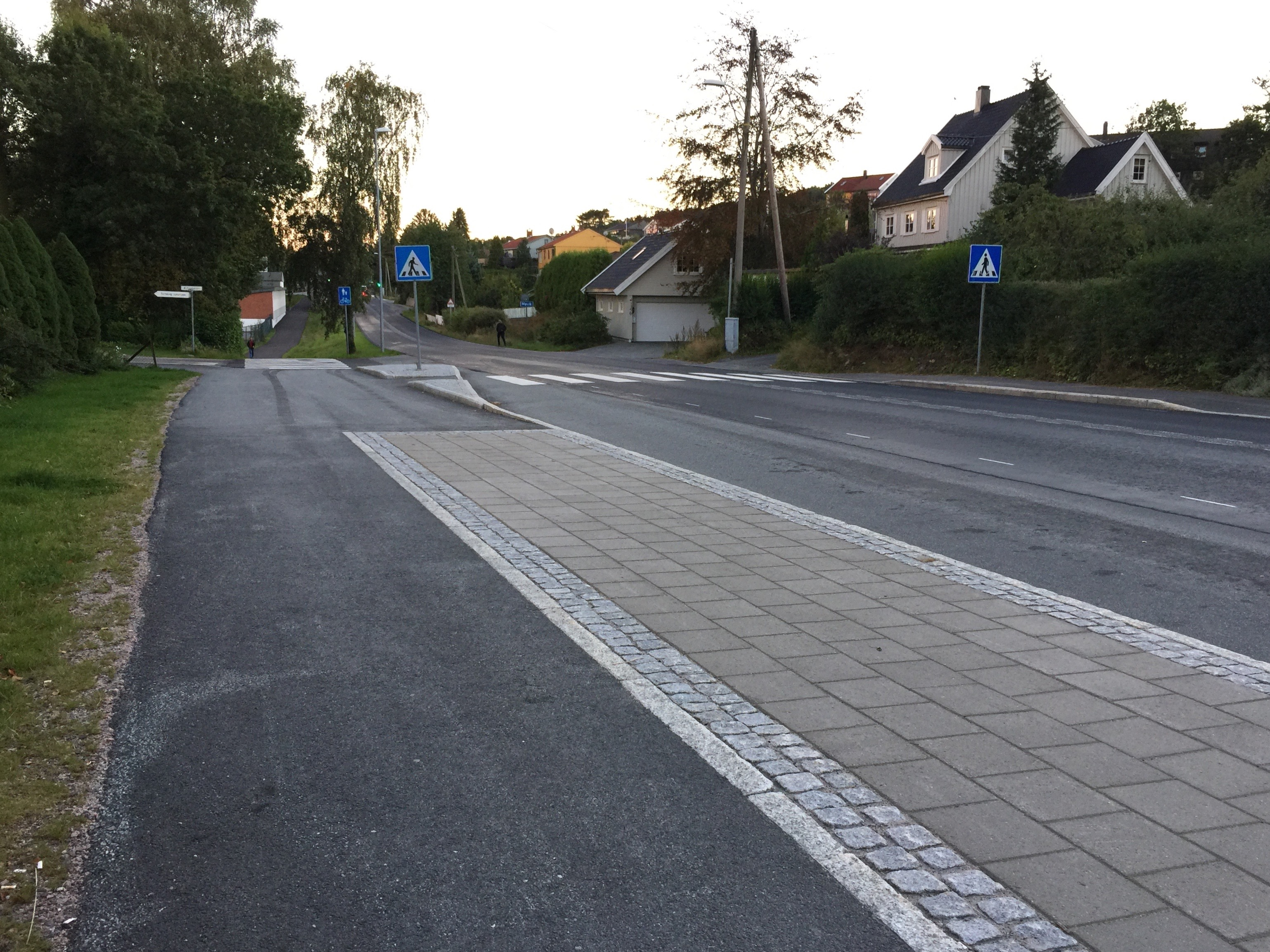
Ternevig in Møvik

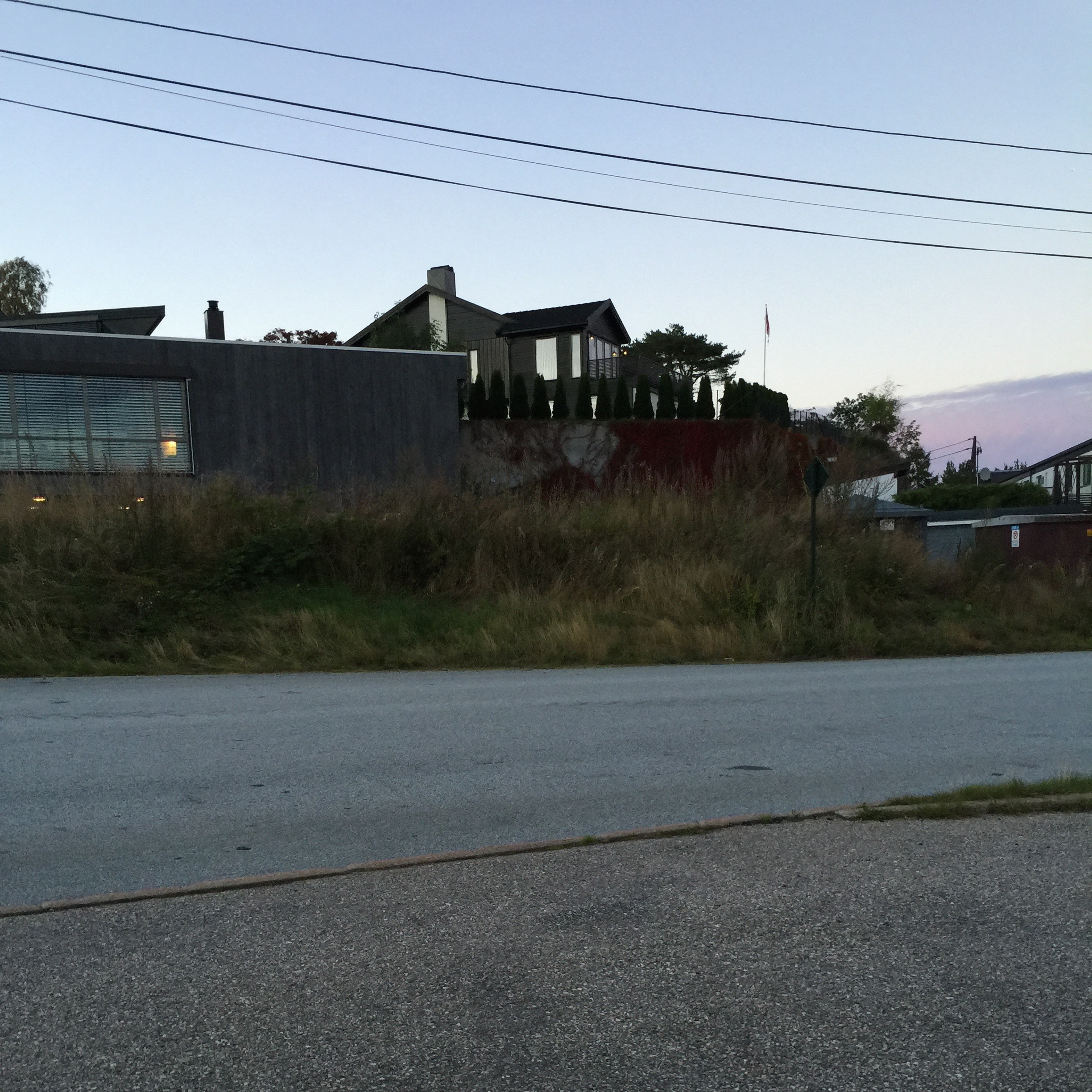
Voiebyen sørøst

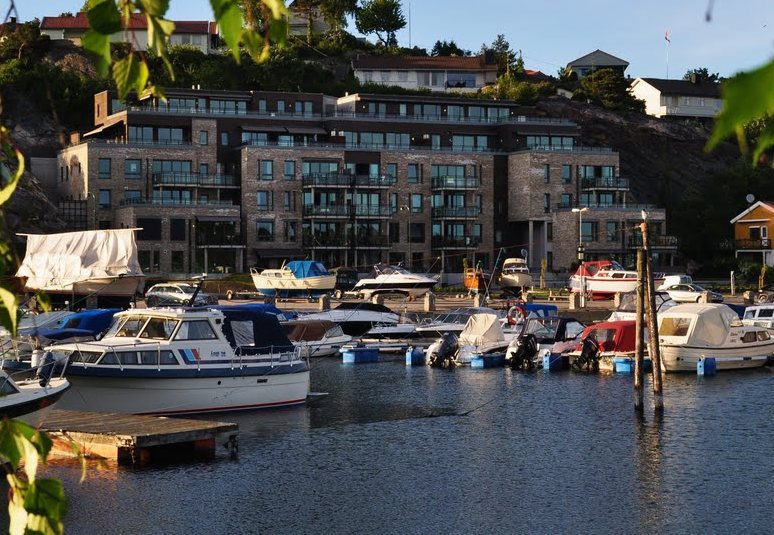
Auglandsbukta

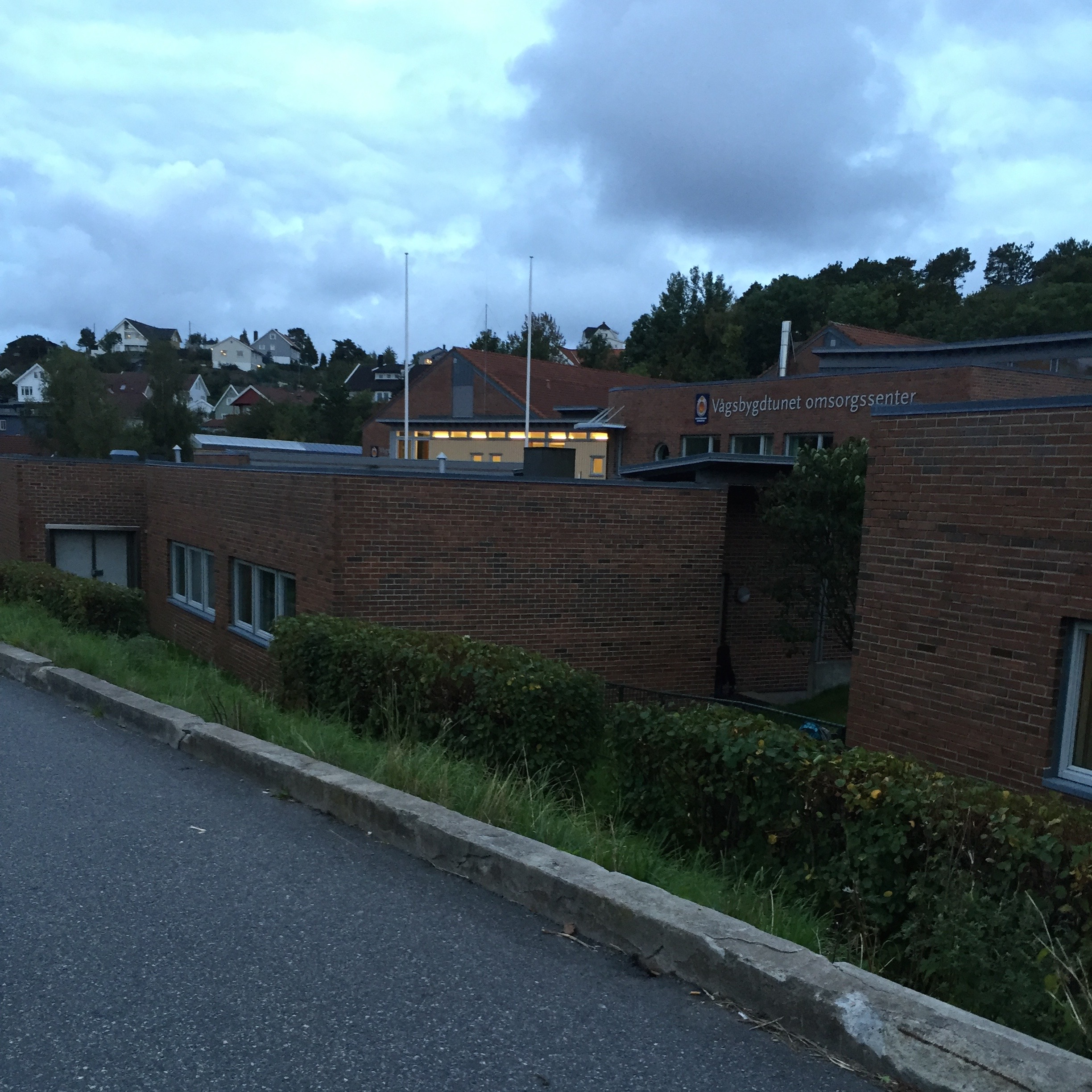
Vågsbygdtunet with Kjos in the background

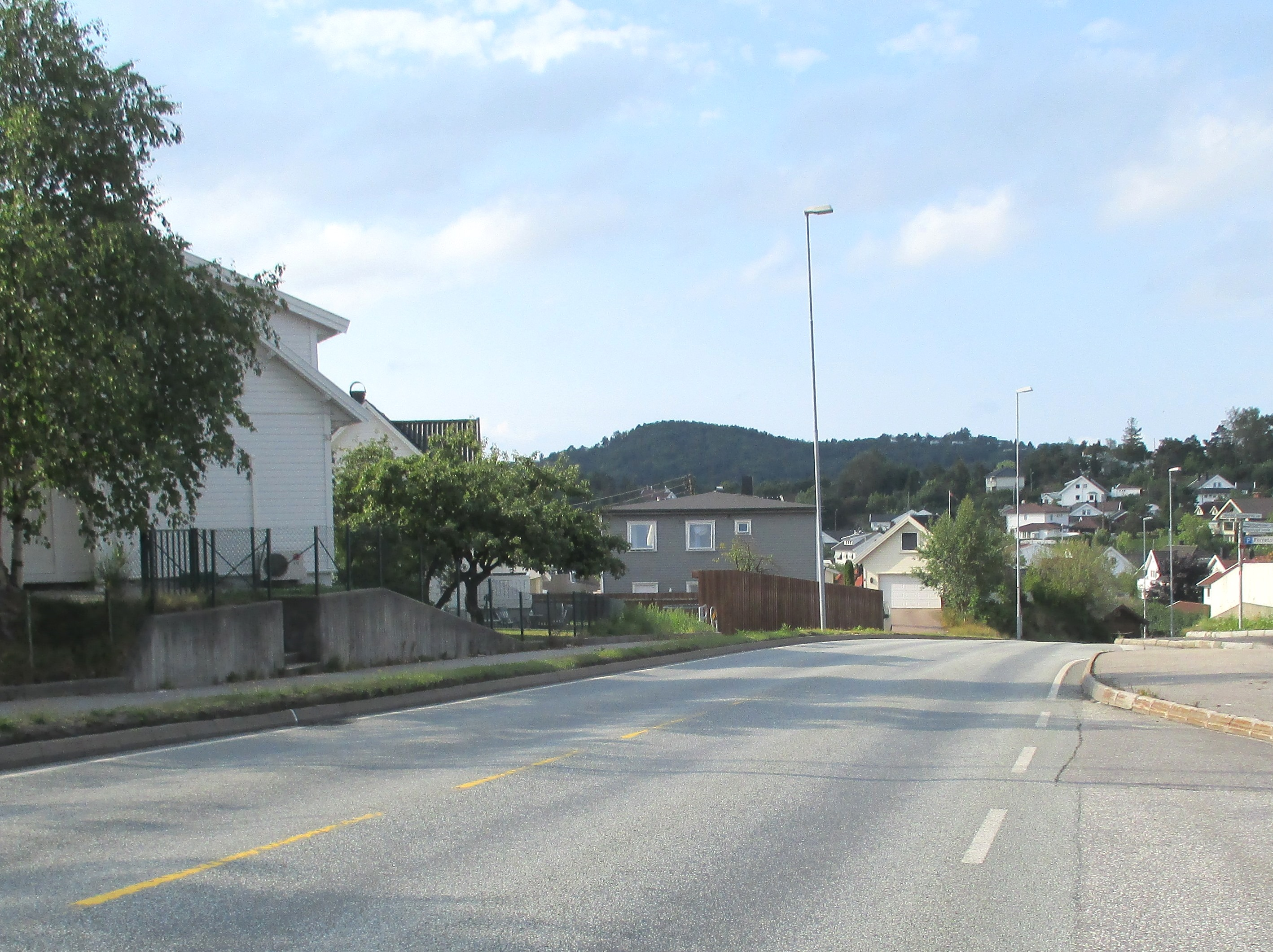
Skyllingsheia

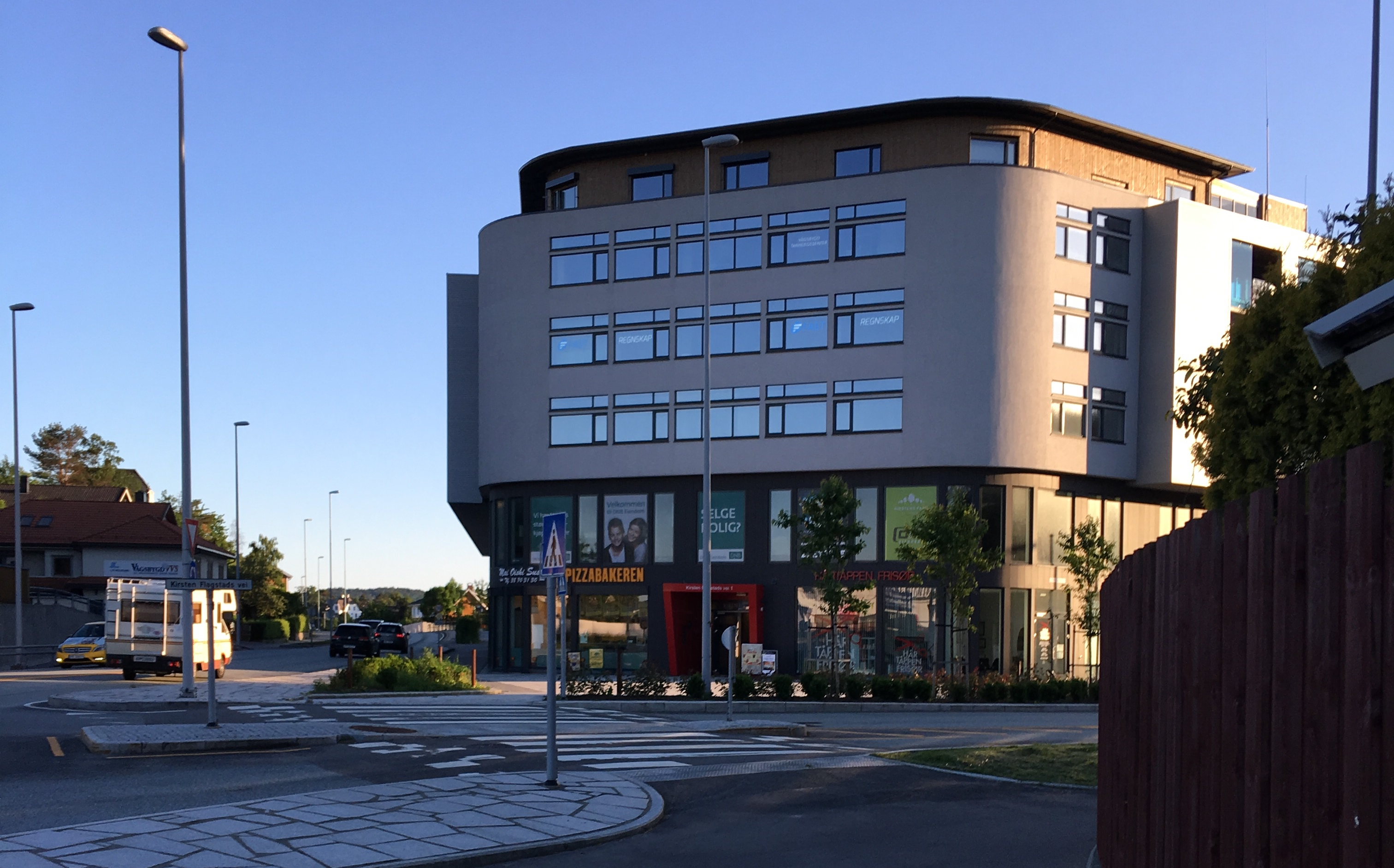
Vågsbygd sentrum

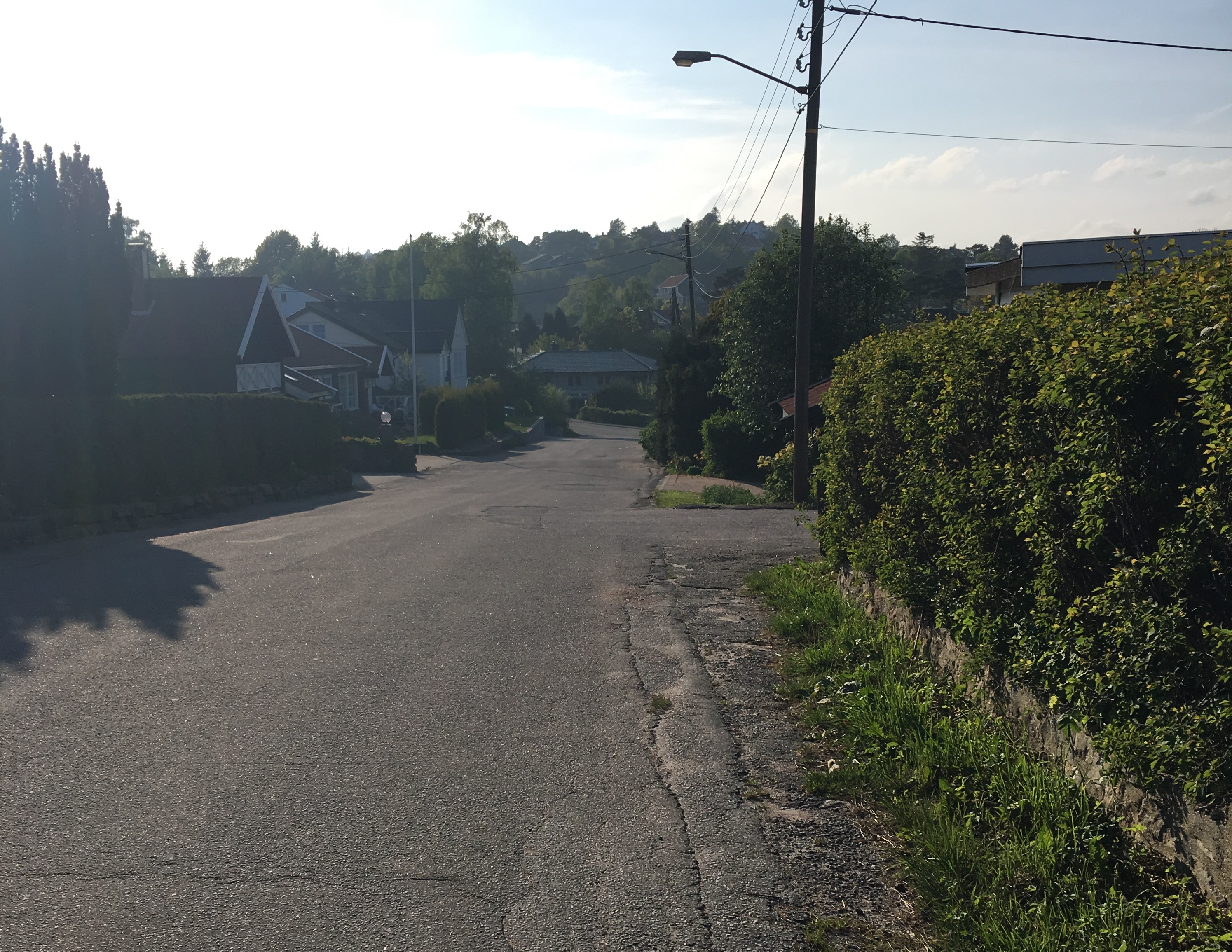
Fiskåtangen

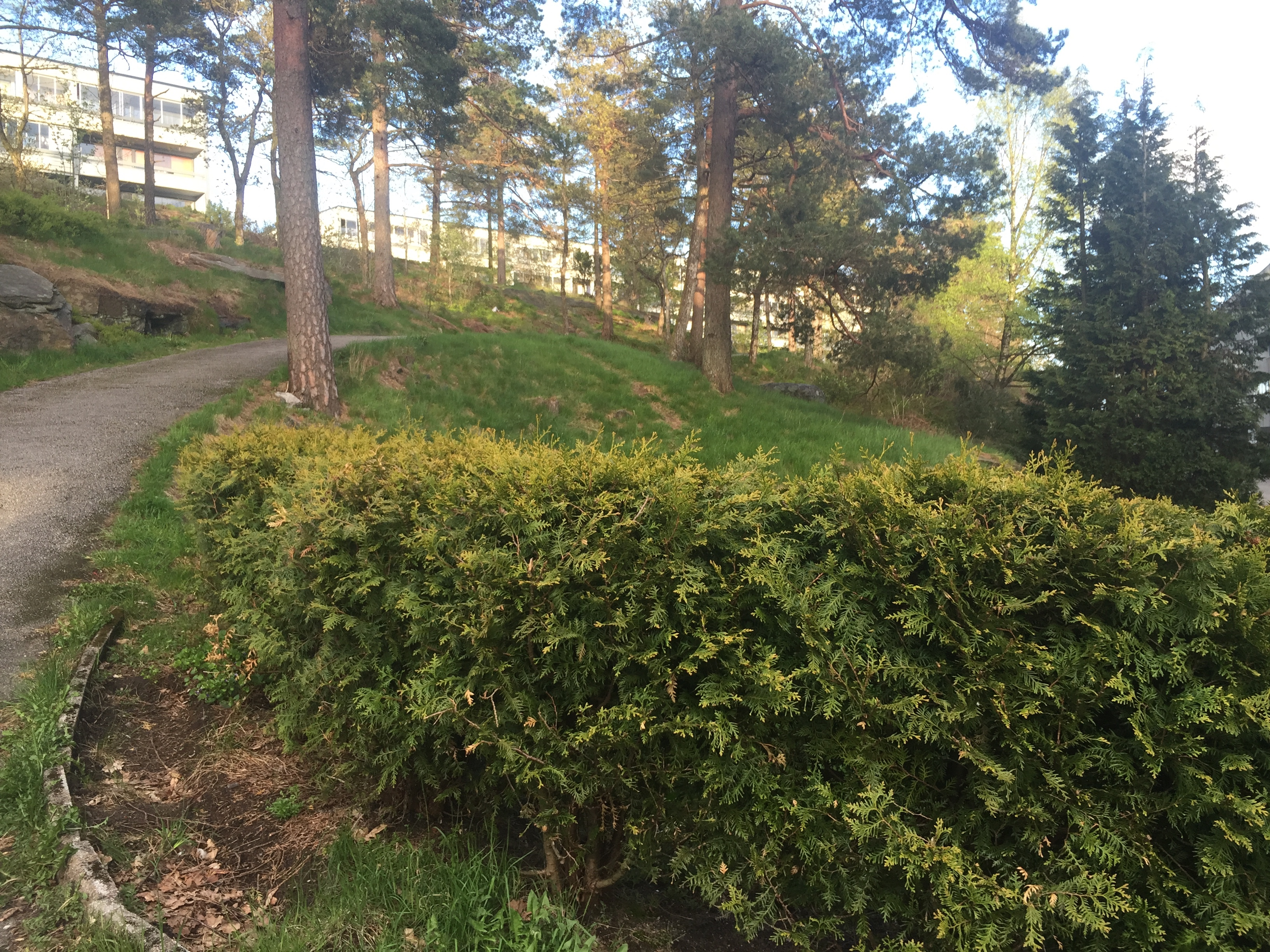
Slettheiveien

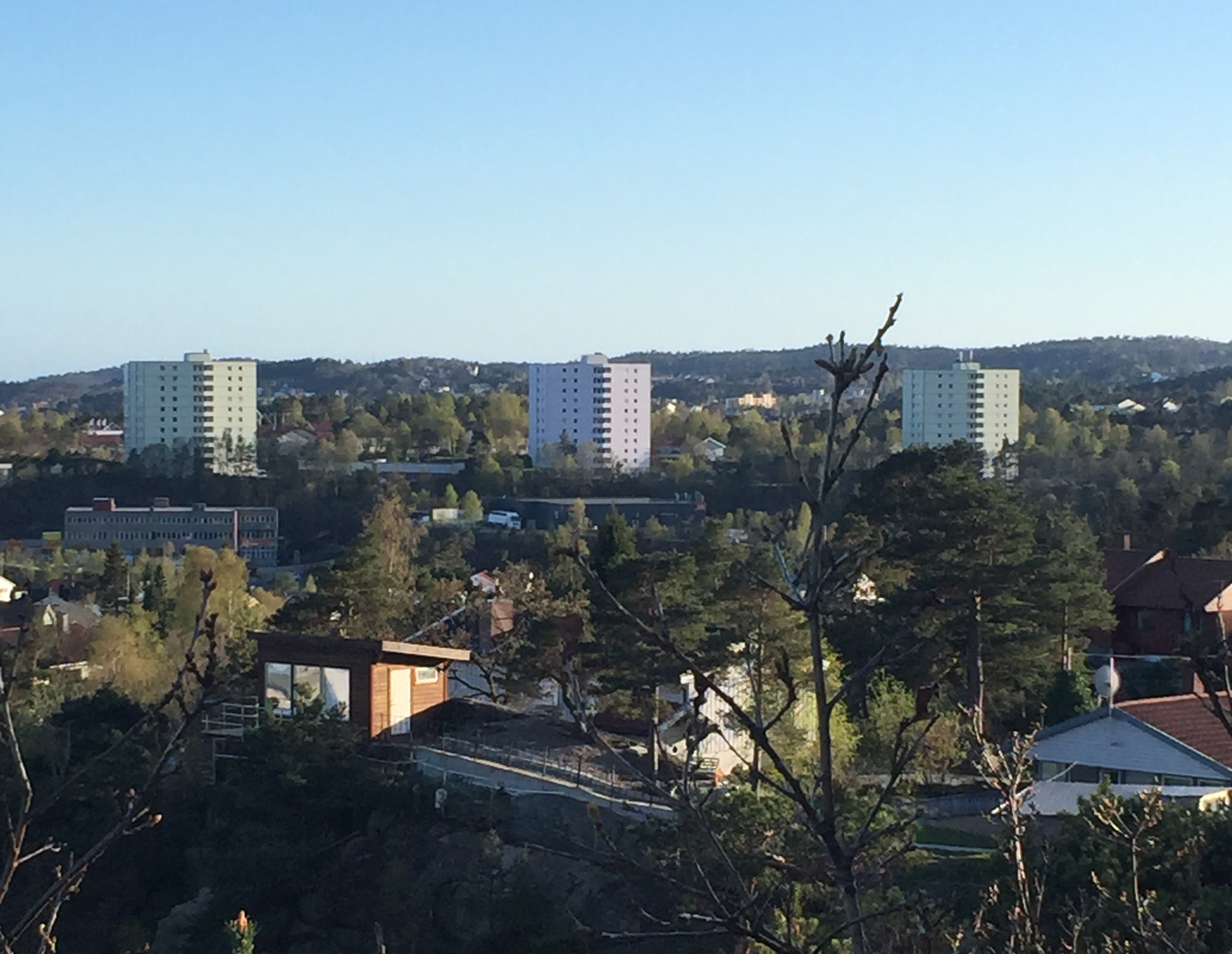
Slettheitoppen

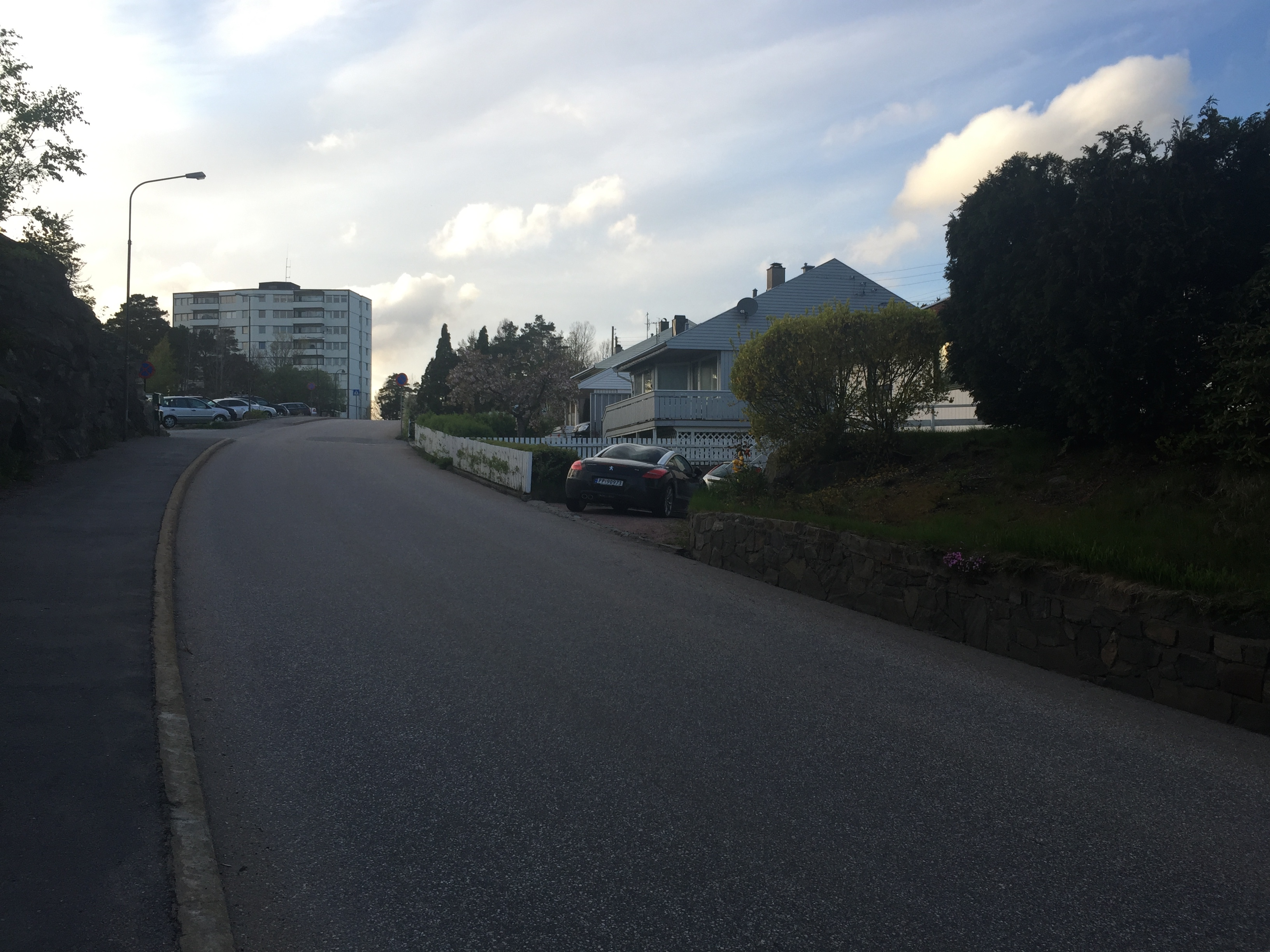
Øvre Slettheia

== Politics ==
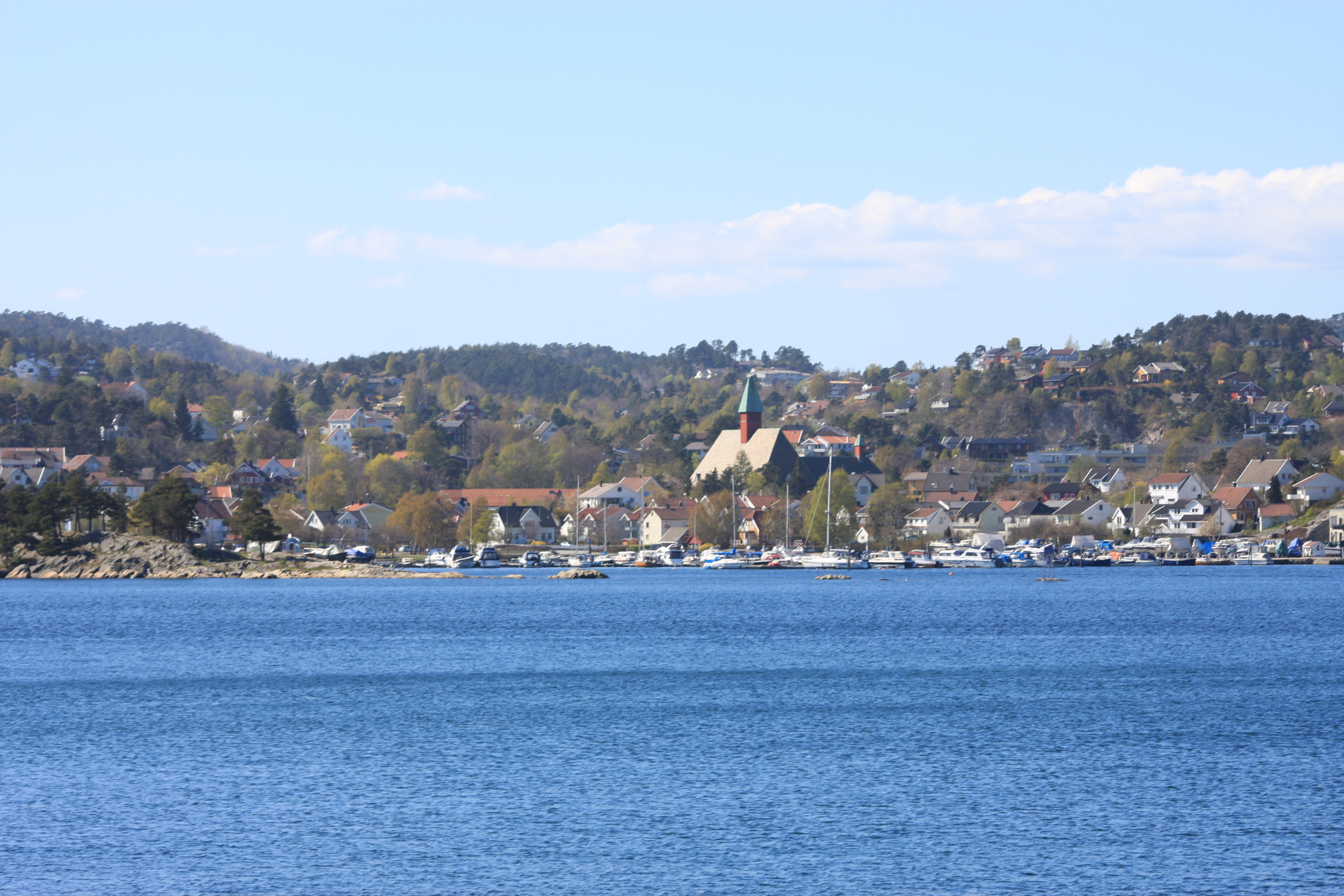
Vågsbygd from sea

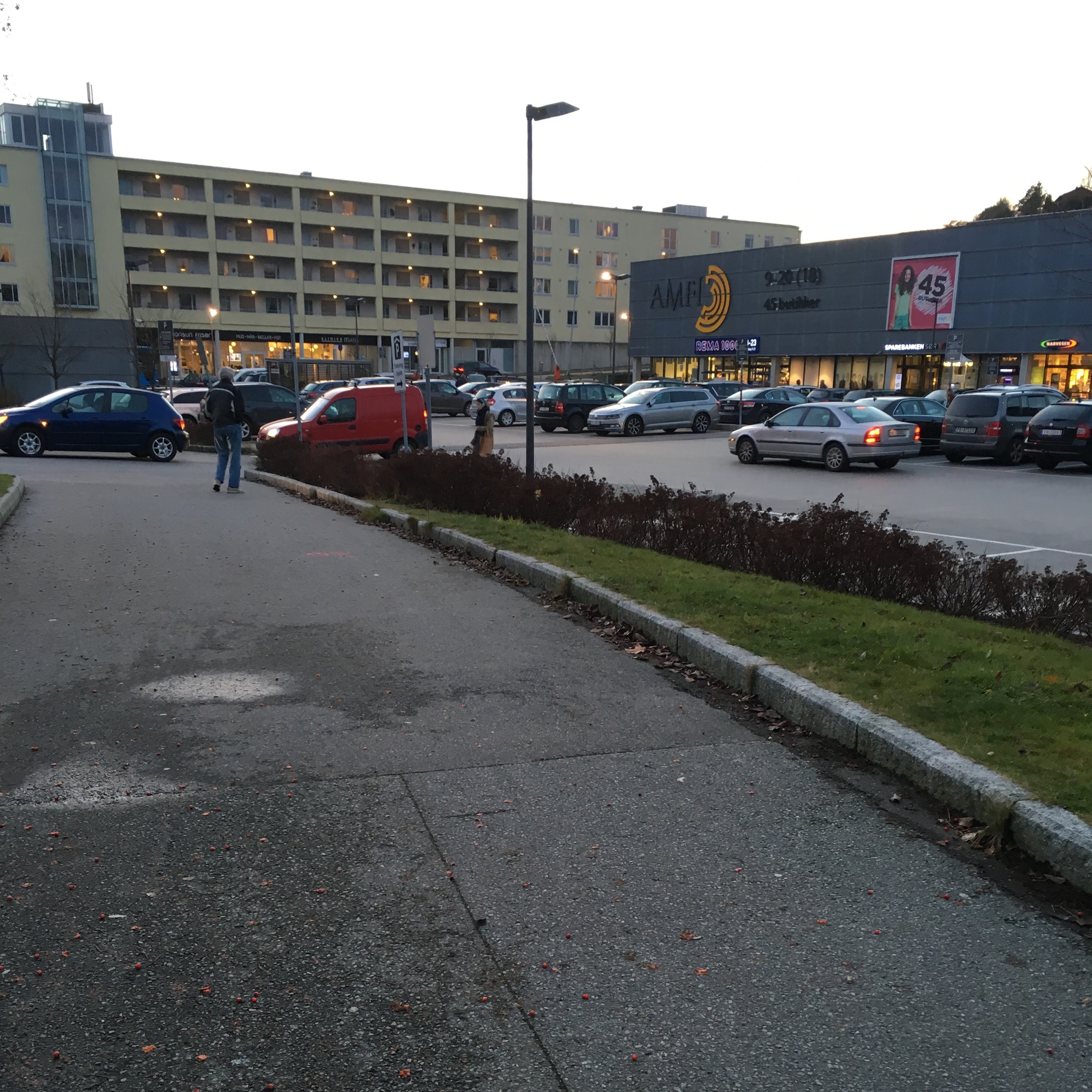
Vågsbygd Centrum

The 10 largest politics parties in Vågsbygd in 2015:

Kristiansand city council votes from Vågsbygd district 2015
Labour Party	33.6% (858 votes)
Conservative Party	20.3% (518 votes)
Christian Democratic Party	15% (382 votes)
Progress Party	8% (204 votes)
Green Party	5.1% (131 votes)
Liberal Party	4.2% (108 votes)
Socialist Left Party	3.6% (91 votes)
The Democrats	3% (77 votes)
Pensioners' Party	2.4% (62 votes)
Red	1.9% (48 votes)
Centre Party	1.5% (37 votes)
Others	1.7% (44 votes)
Total	2516 votes

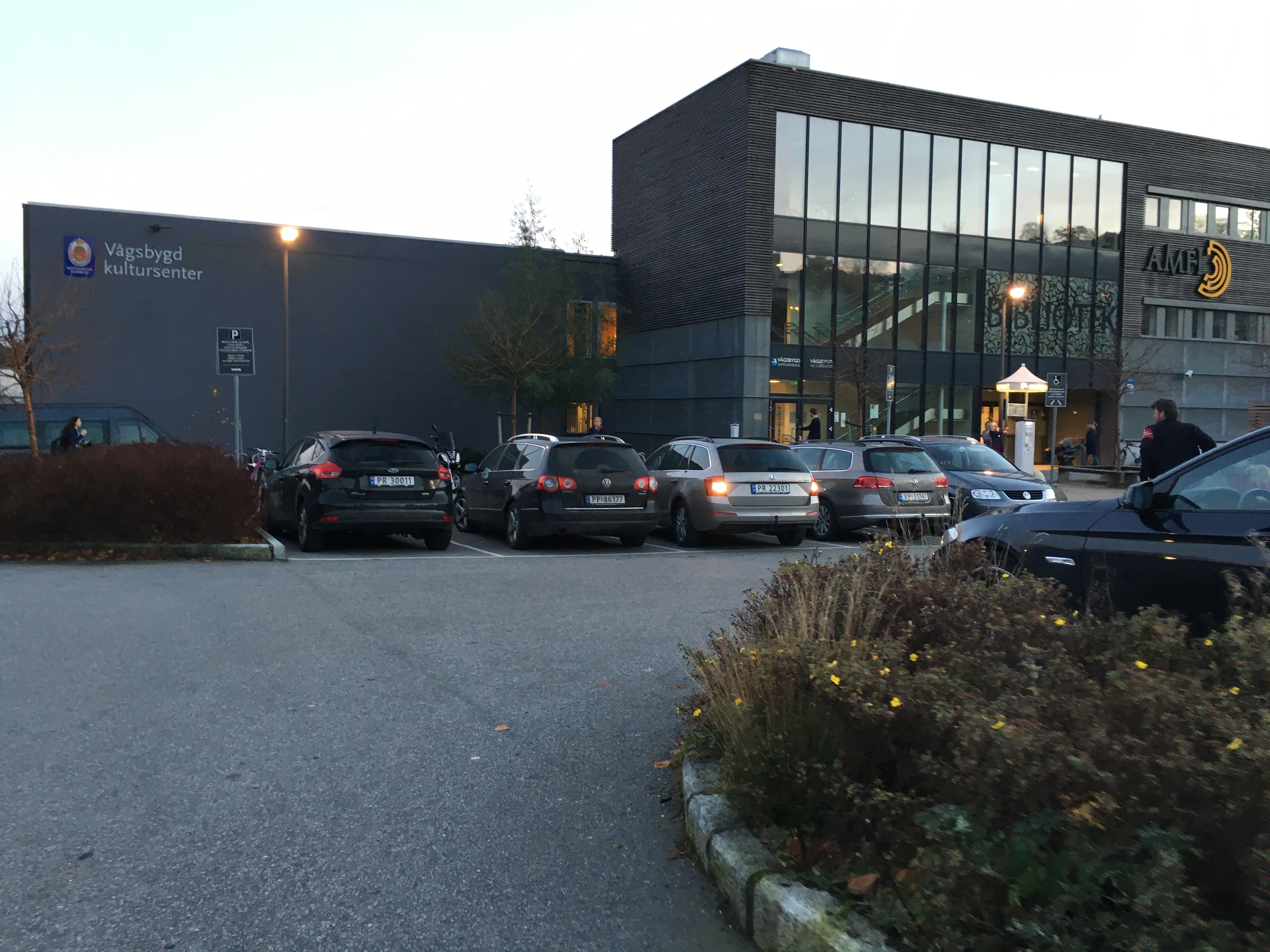
Vågsbygd Society and Culture Hall

Kristiansand city council votes from Vågsbygd borough 2015
Labour Party	2173 votes
Conservative Party	1668 votes
Christian Democratic Party	1619 votes
Progress Party	619 votes
Green Party	288 votes
Liberal Party	241 votes
Socialist Left Party	437 votes
The Democrats	418 votes
Pensioners' Party	153 votes
Red	132 votes
Centre Party	86 votes
Total	7670 votes

== Education ==
List of schools in Vågsbygd
Name	Location	Type
Fiskå skole	Vågsbygd sentrum	Junior High
Flekkerøy skole	Flekkerøy	Elementary school
Karuss skole	Karuss	Elementary and Junior High
Lindebøskauen skole	Flekkerøy	Junior High
Møvik skole	Møvik	Junior High
Sjøstranden skole	Voiebyen	Elementary
Slettheia skole	Nedre Slettheia	Elementary
Torkelsmyra skole	Steindalen	Elementary
Voiebyen skole	Voiebyen	Elementary
Vågsbygd skole	Vågsbygd sentrum	Elementary
Vågsbygd videregående skole	Vågsbygd sentrum	High School
Øvre Slettheia skole	Slettheitoppen	Elementary
Åsane skole	Åsane	Elementary

=== Photos ===
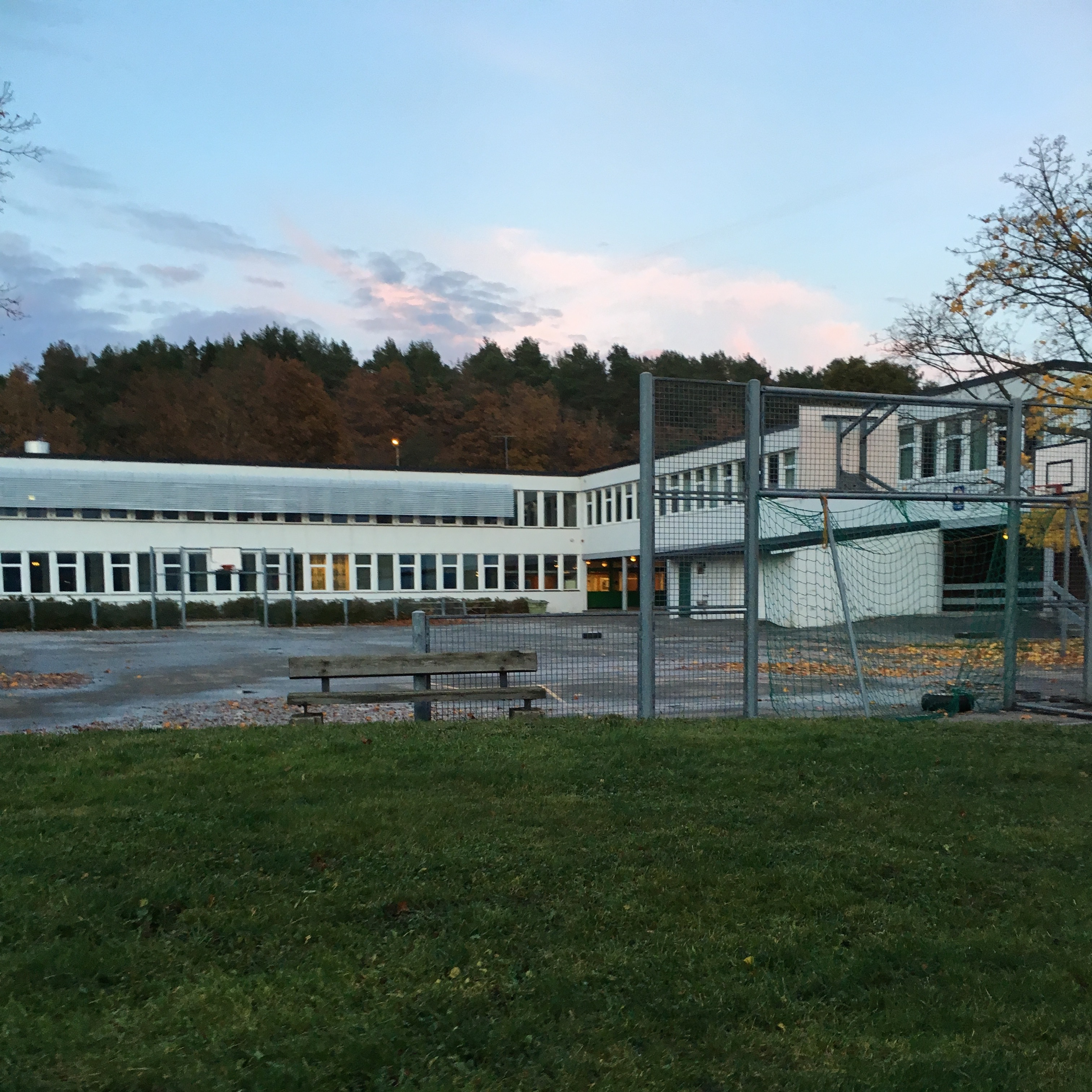
Fiskå Junior High

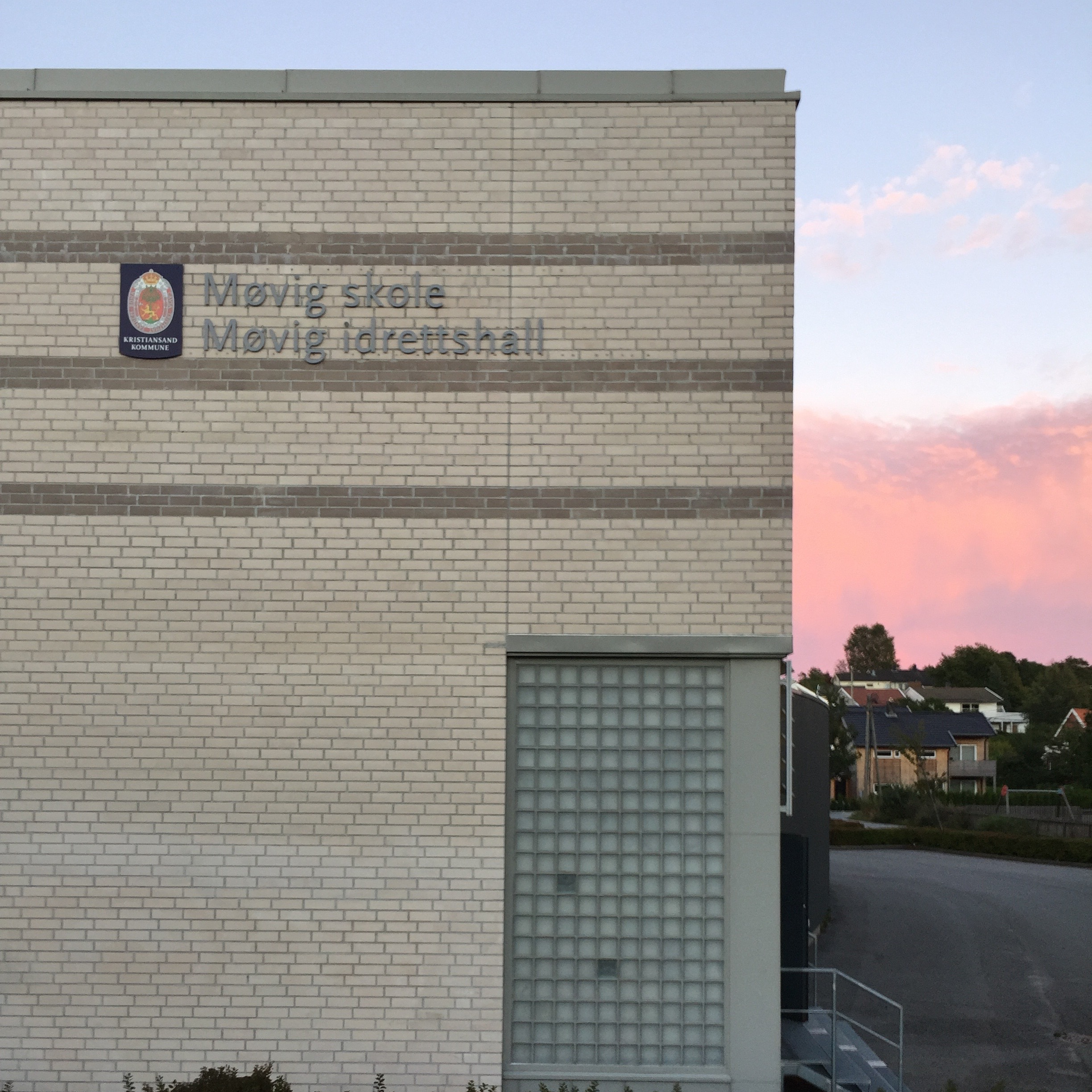
Møvig Junior High

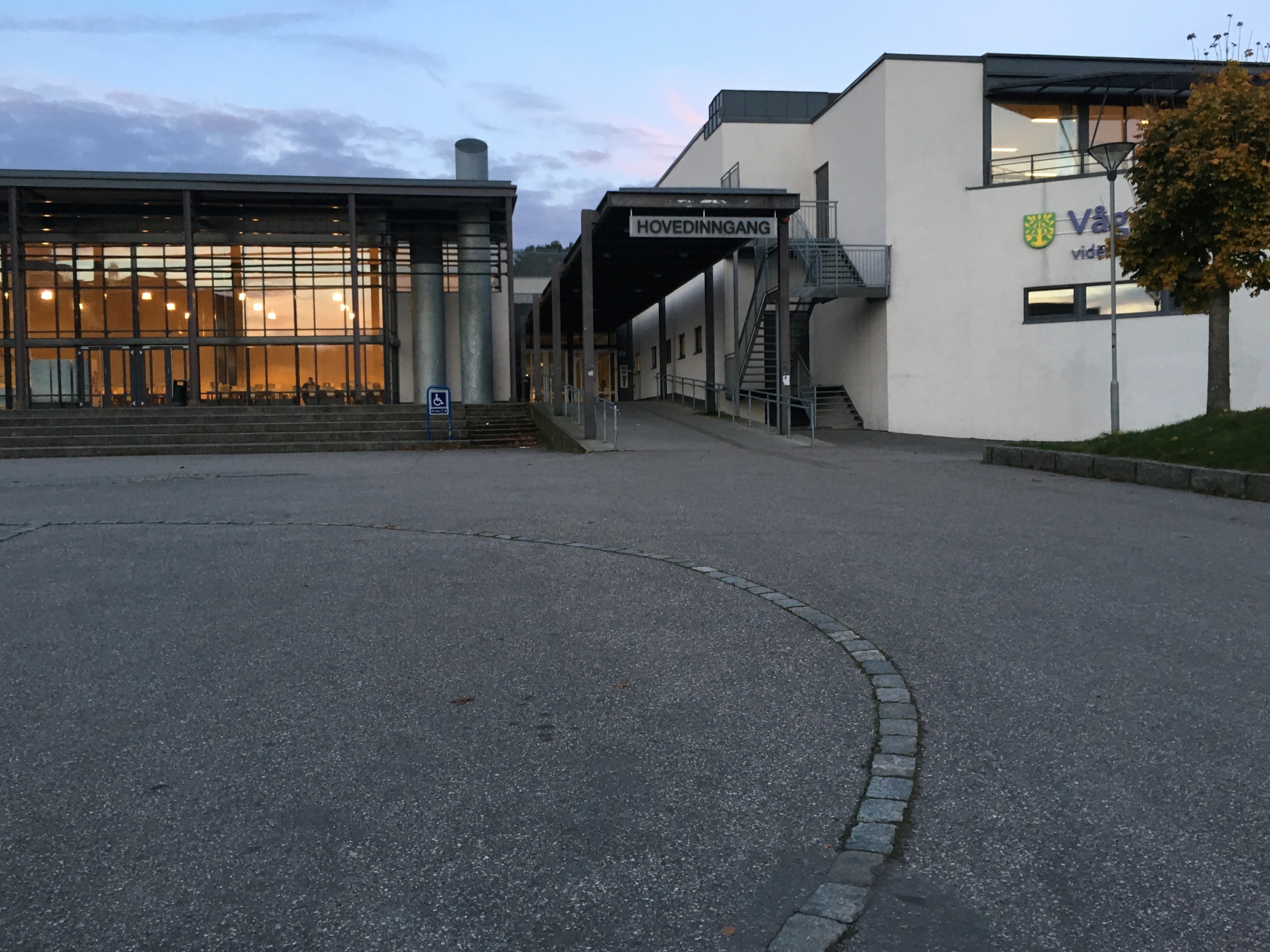
Vågsbygd High School

== Religion ==
There are 3 churches in Vågsbygd.

- Flekkerøy Church is the only church at the island Flekkerøya. It was built in 1960 with a capacity of 375 people. The church was built out of concrete, there is a graveyard with the church.
- Voie Church is located in Voiebyen, the church is the newest one in Vågsbygd, it was built in 1990 with no graveyard with the church. It has a capacity of 500 and is built by bricks.
- Vågsbygd Church is located in Vågsbygd centrum and has a capacity of 650 people. There is no graveyard with the church and was built in 1967.
- There is a Mormon church located at Slettheia.

=== Photos ===
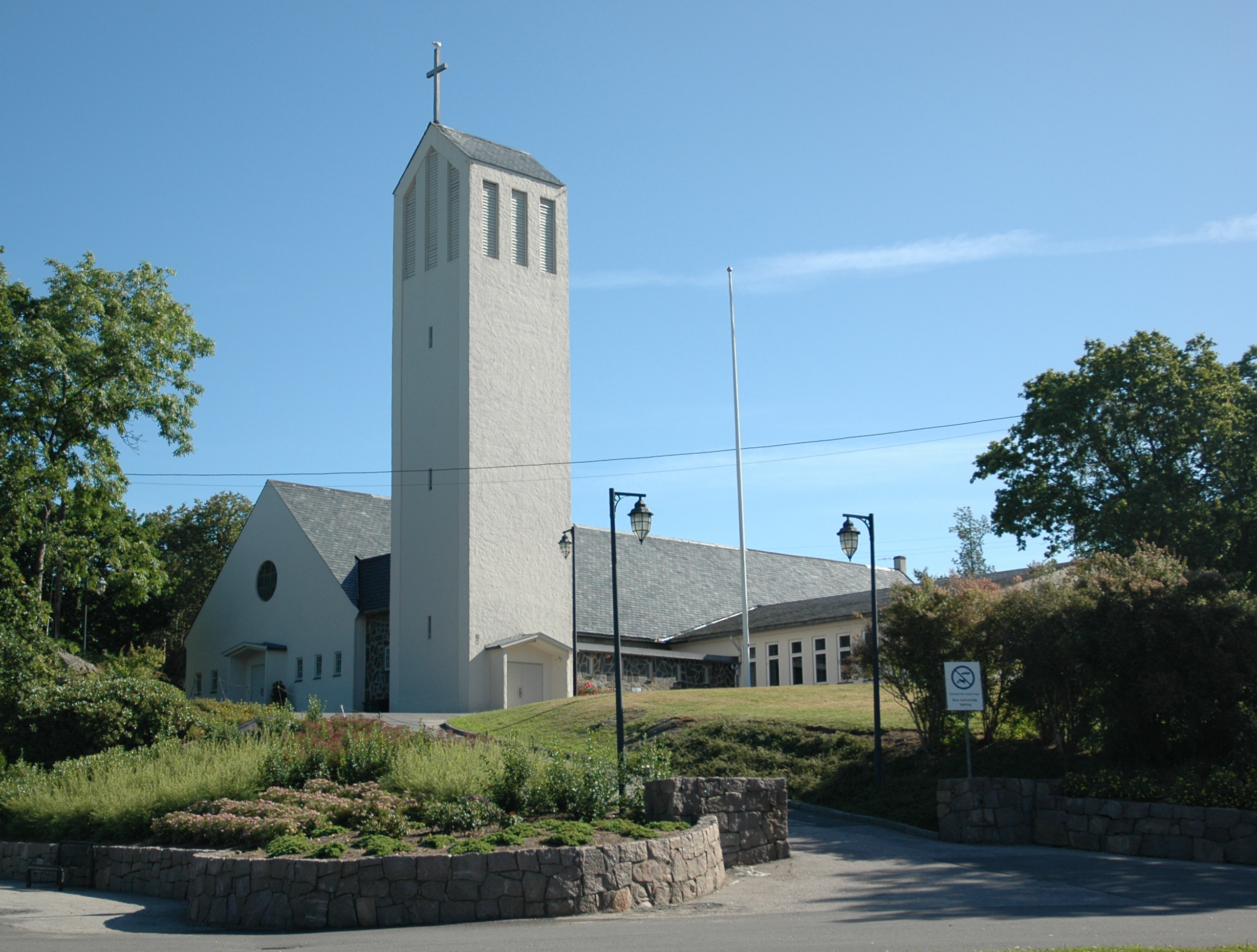
Flekkerøy Church

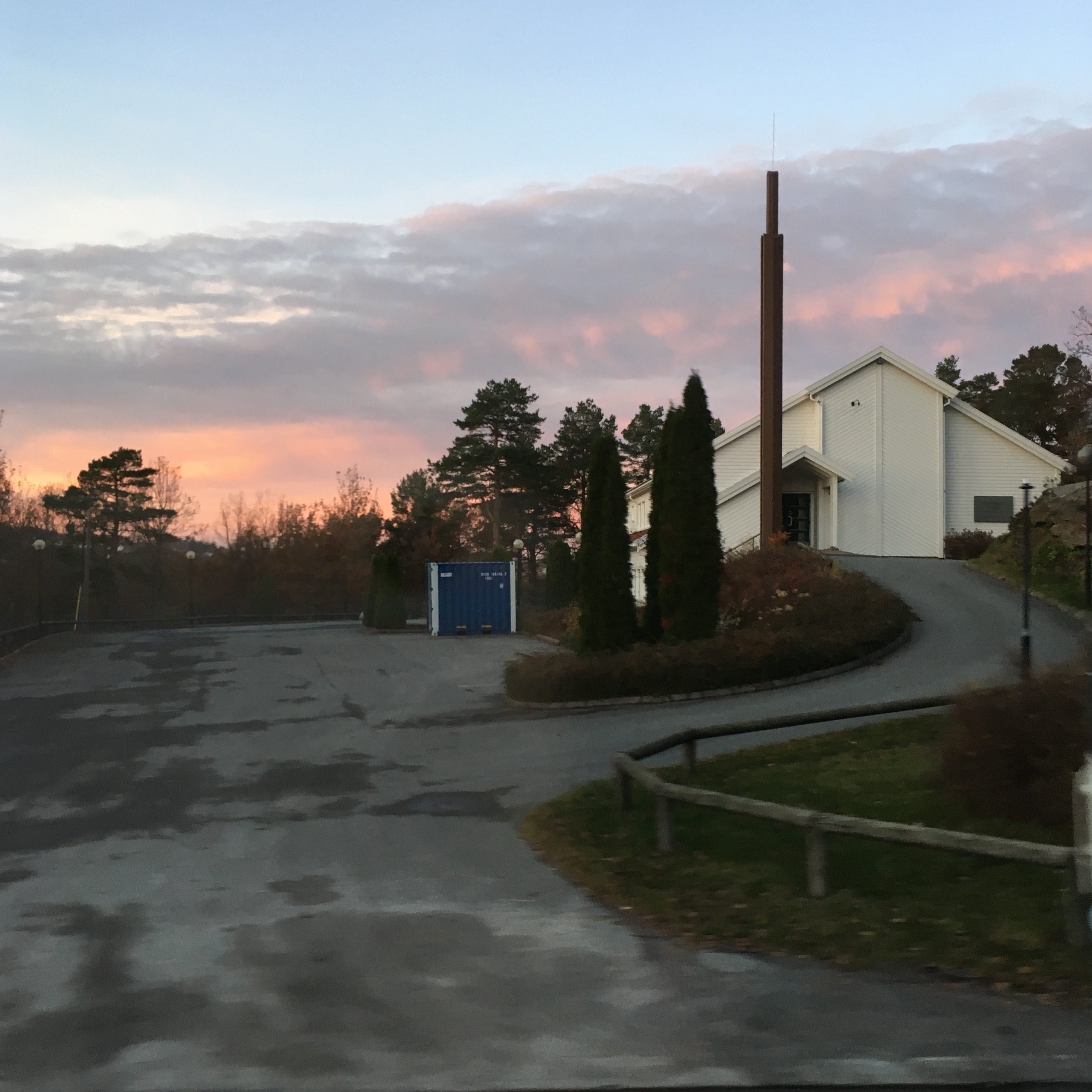
Slettheia Mormon Church is the only Mormon church in Kristiansand

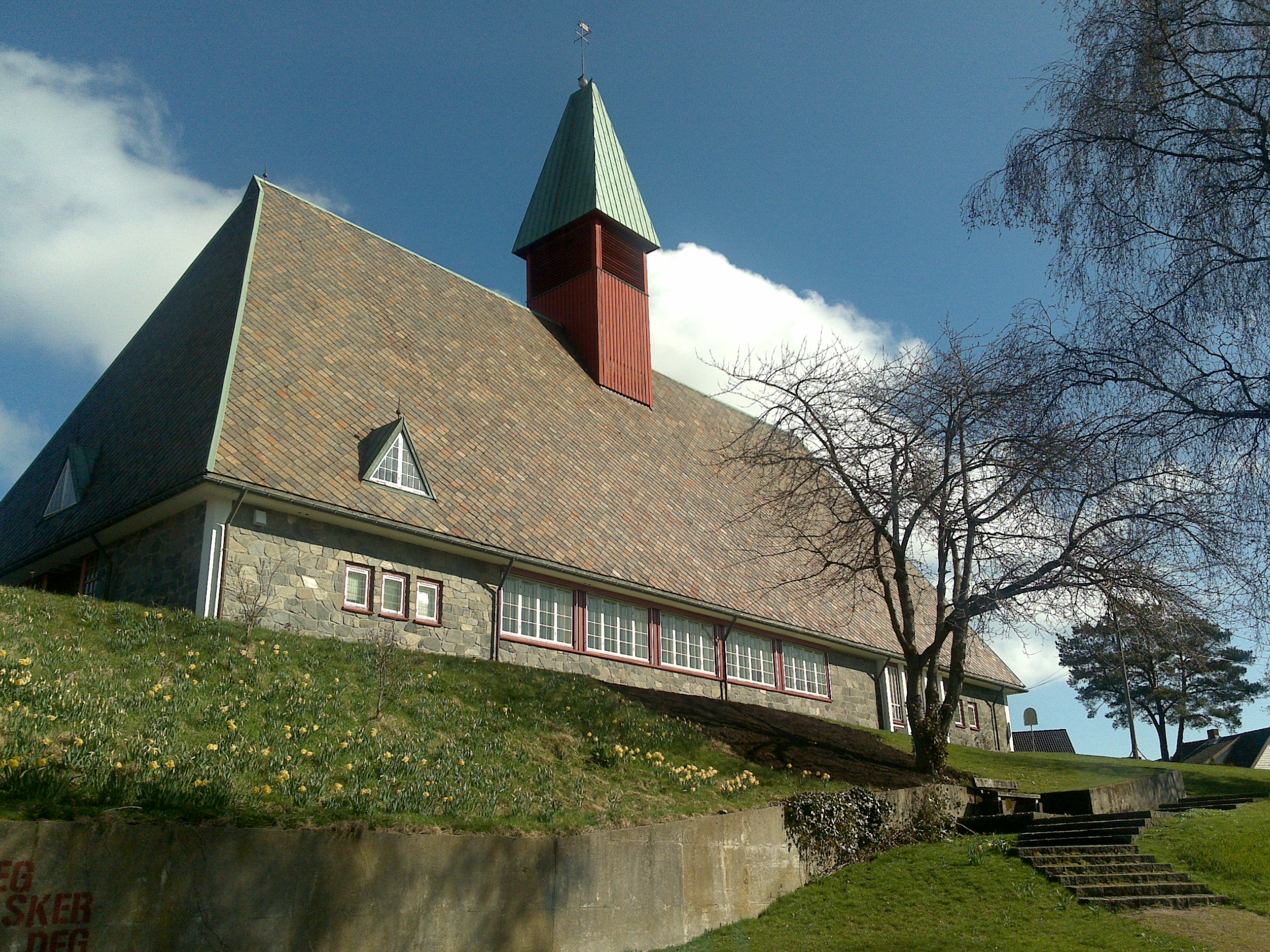
Vågsbygd Church is the largest church in the borough

== Transportation ==
=== Road ===
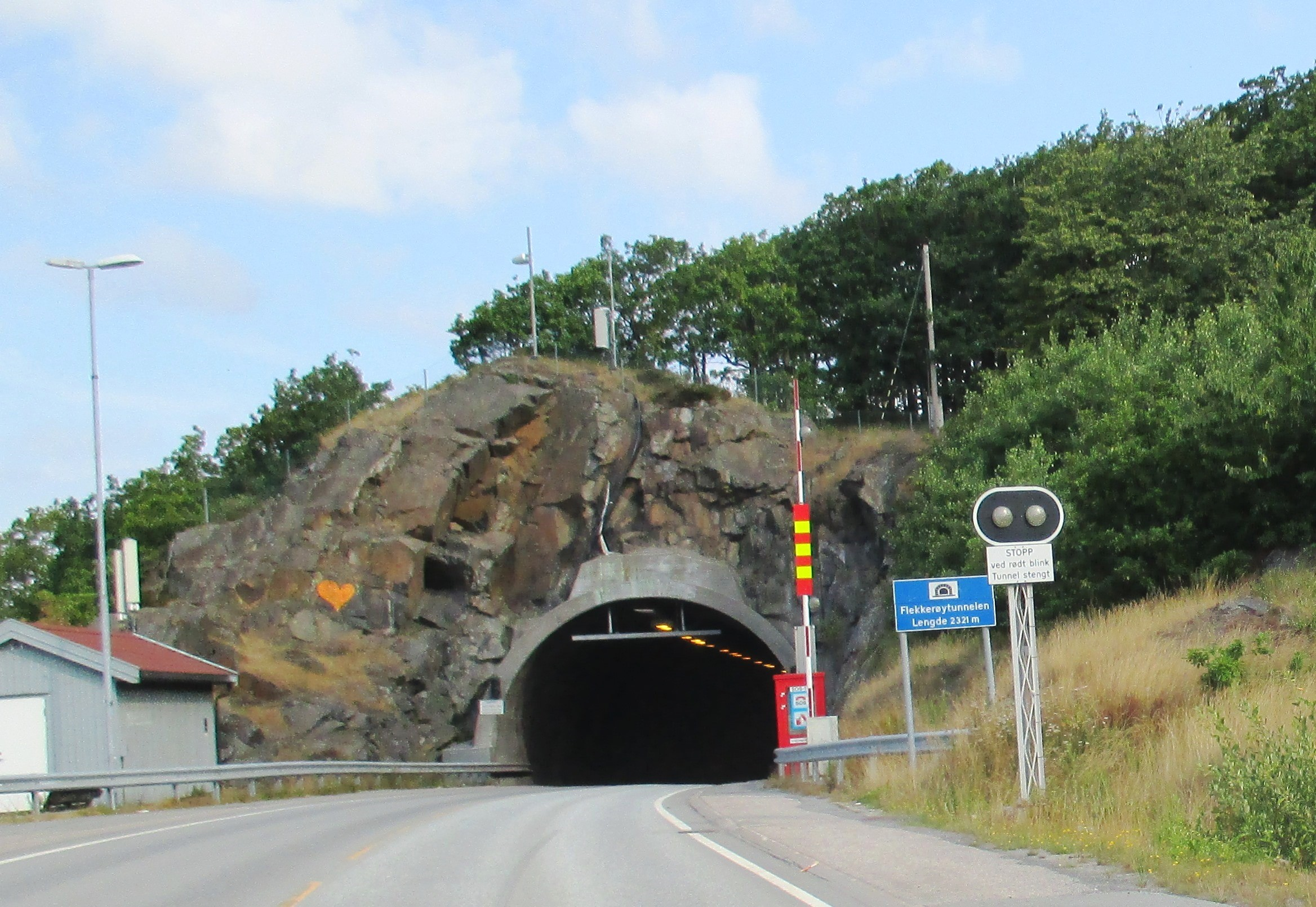
County Road 457. The Flekkerøy tunnel at the mainland

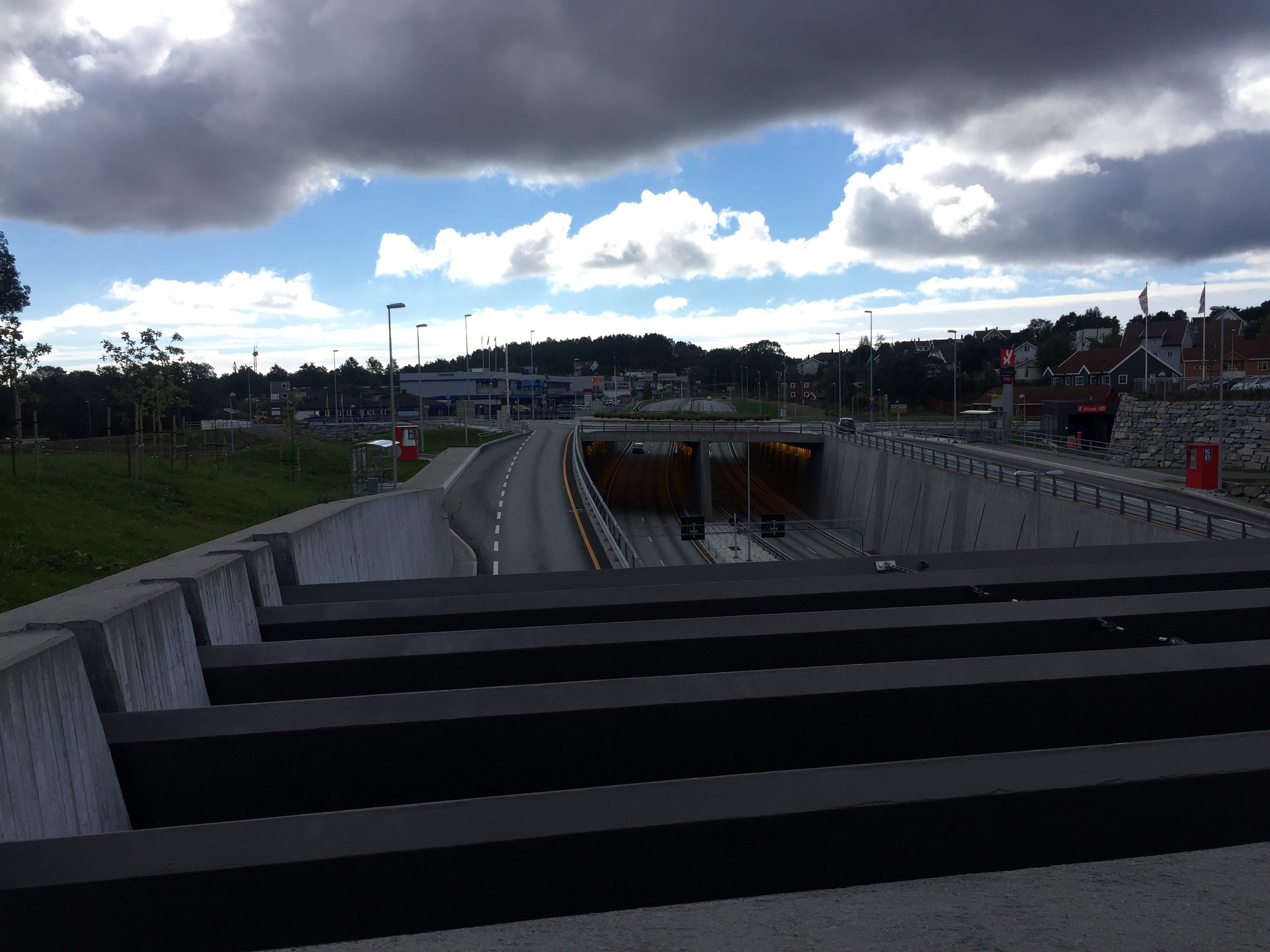
The Vågsbygdport

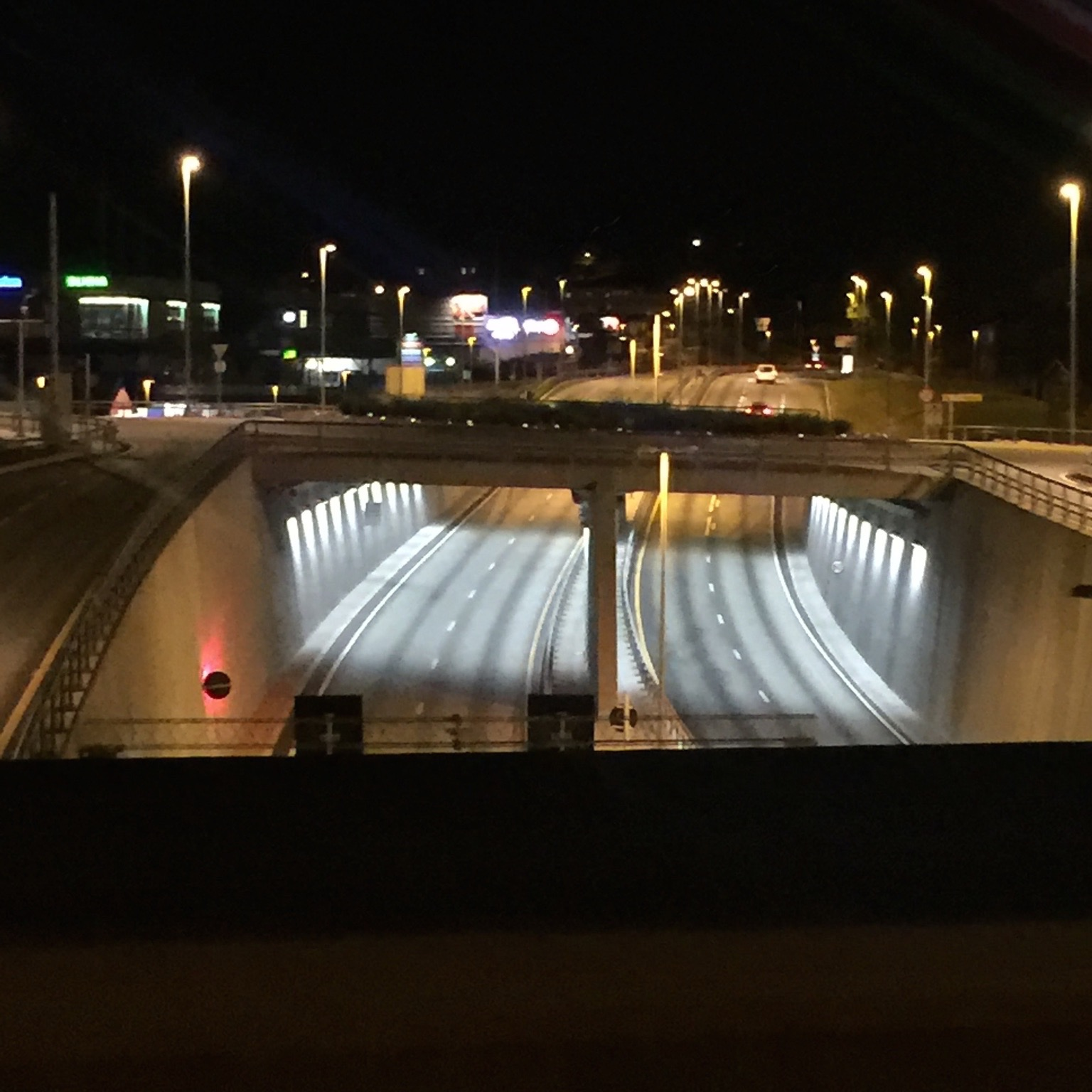
Vågsbygdveien

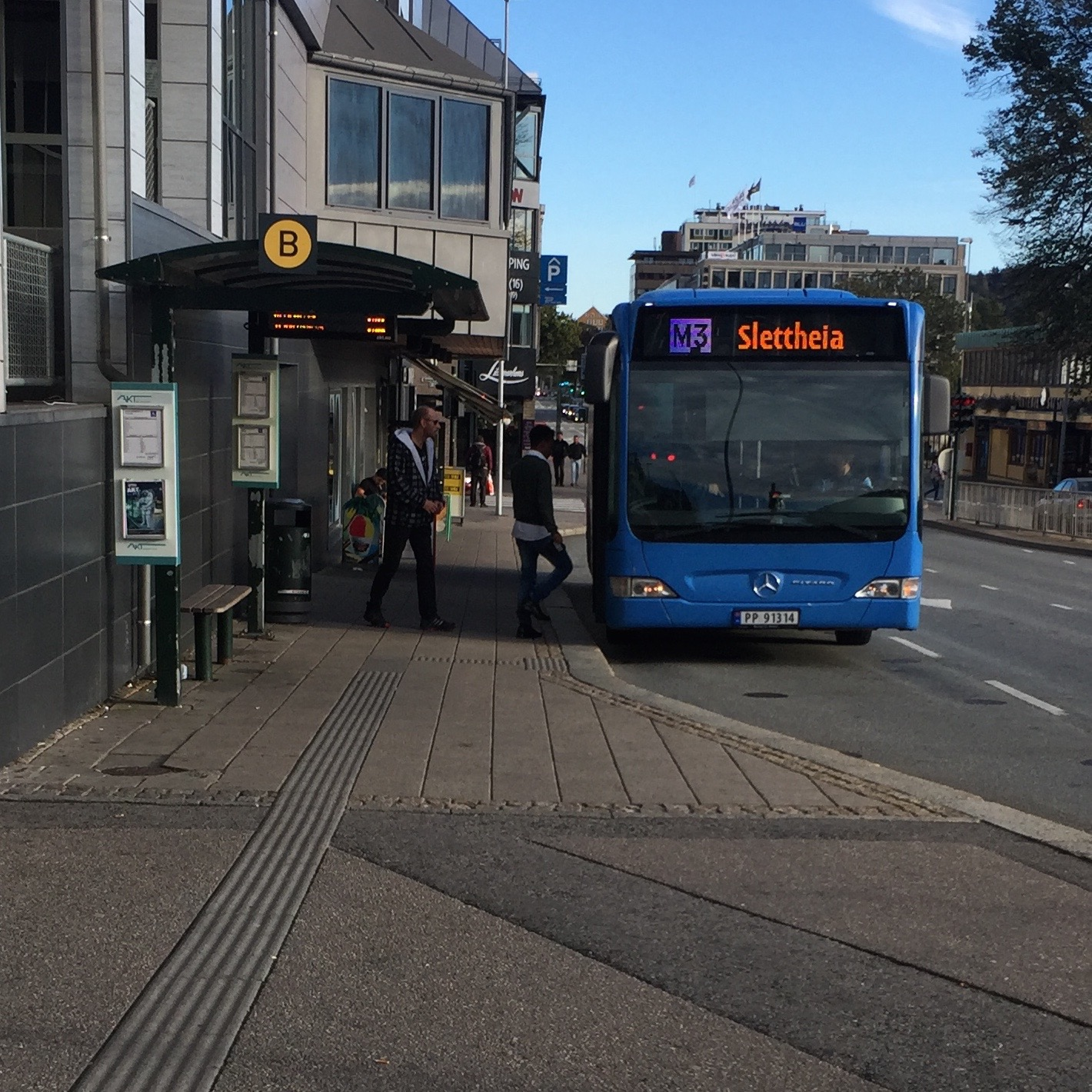
Bus bound for Slettheia

County Road 456 is the main road in to Vågsbygd, the highway part starts with European route E39 in Hannevika and ends with a roundabout in Vågsbygd centrum. That part of the road is called the Vågsbygdport cause it goes threw a tunnel between the city and Vågsbygd. It was recently upgraded to 4 files in 2014. The old 456, goes from Hannevika around Blørstad and ends with Trekanten. County Road 456 continues there with the shore till Voiebyen before it goes west and ends in Søgne. From Flekkerøya, County Road 457 goes from the island threw the Flekkerøy Tunnel to the mainland and meets County Road 456 with Voie.

European Route E39 goes between Vågsbygd and Grim before exiting into the area of the old Songdalen Municipality.

Notable roads in Vågsbygd
Line	Destination
E39	Downtown - Kartheia - Stavanger
Fv8	Åshavn - Skålevik
Fv456	Hannevika - Trekanten - Vågsbygd centrum - Voiebyen - Søgne
Fv457	Voie - Flekkerøy

=== Bus ===
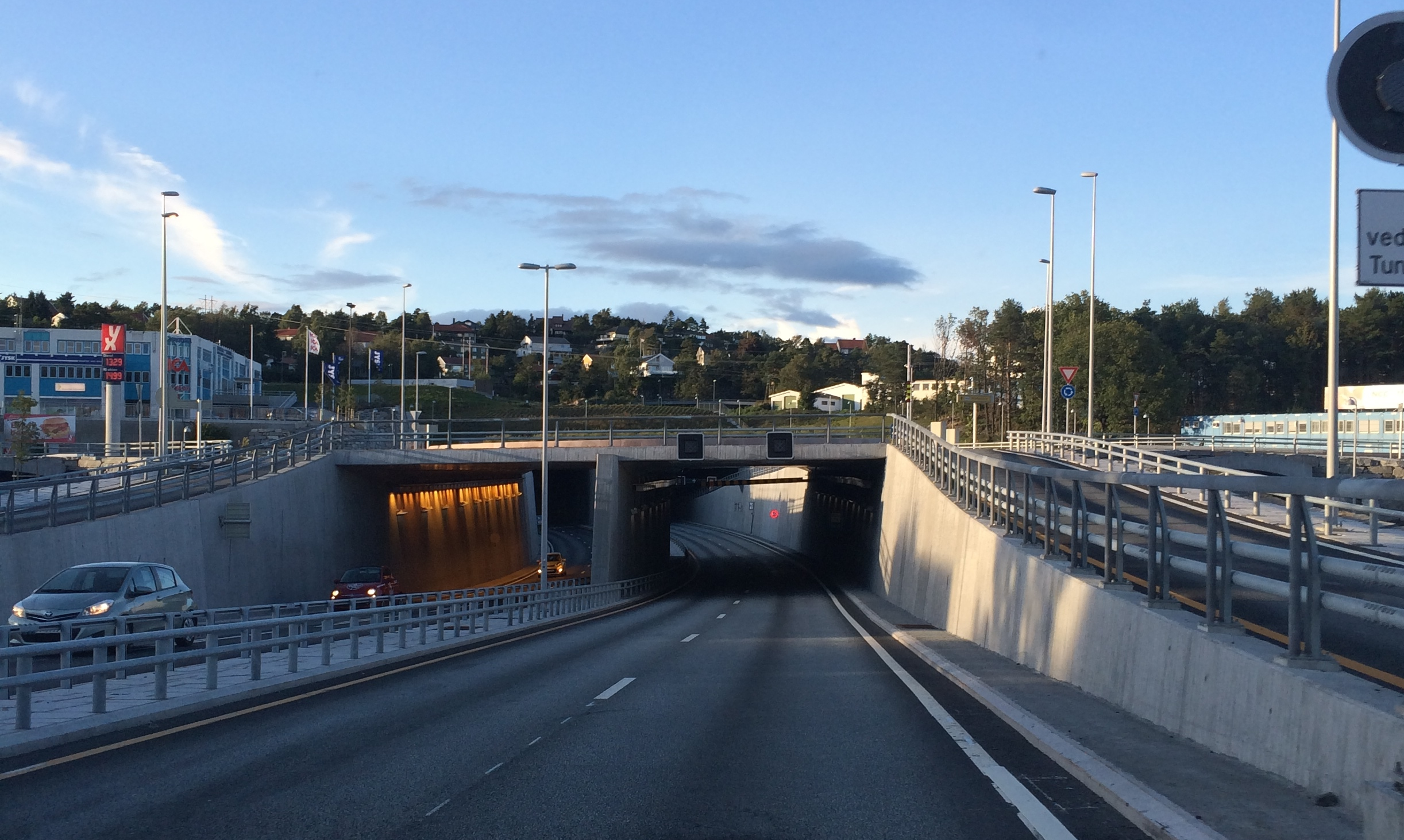
County Road 456 with Trekanten

Bus in Vågsbygd is mostly served by line: M1, M2, M3, 05, 09 and 12

Bus transportation from/through Vågsbygd
Line	Destination
M1	Flekkerøy - Sørlandsparken Dyreparken-IKEA
M1	Flekkerøy - Kvadraturen
M2	Voiebyen - Hånes
M2	Voiebyen - Hånes-Lauvåsen
D2	Voiebyen - Kvadraturen
D2	Voiebyen - Kvadraturen-UiA
N2	Flekkerøy - Voiebyen - Kvadraturen
M3	Vågsbygd kirke - Slettheia - Søm
D3	Vågsbygd kirke - Slettheia - Kvadraturen
D3	Vågsbygd kirke - Slettheia - Kvadraturen-UiA
N3	Vågsbygd kirke - Slettheia - Søm
05	Andøya - Vågsbygd kirke
05	Andøya - Kvadraturen
05	Andøya - Kvadraturen-UiA
09	Bråvann - Vågsbygd kirke
09	Bråvann - Kvadraturen
09	Bråvann - Kvadraturen-UiA
12	Kjos Haveby - Eg-Sykehuset
50	Søgne - Kristiansand
50	Søgne - Kristiansand-UiA

== Economy ==
Agriculture is largely left in Vågsbygd and replaced by residential and industrial areas. Vågsbygd has considerable industry, who has survived major changes. The largest employer is all the same Elkem Solar producing super clean Silicon for solar cells, which are located in premises that Elkem previous Ferrosilicon factory Fiskå Verk. On Andøya it established a significant and advanced mechanical industry which produces offshore and marine cranes and other marine equipment in Andøya Industrial Park.

Amfi Vågsbygd is the second largest mall in Kristiansand, after Sørlandssenteret. It is located in Vågsbygd Centrum with 45 stores and a part of the Amfi Mall chain.

Trekanten Mall is a smaller mall located in Trekanten off the highway County Road 456. It is located in Slettheia and the mall contains a grocery store, floweriest, hair salon, furniture store, gas station and a dentist office.

Fædrelandsvennen, the newspaper for Kristiansand and the Kristiansand Region used to be located on Fiskå from the 70s before it moved back to Kvadraturen in 2015.

=== Photos ===
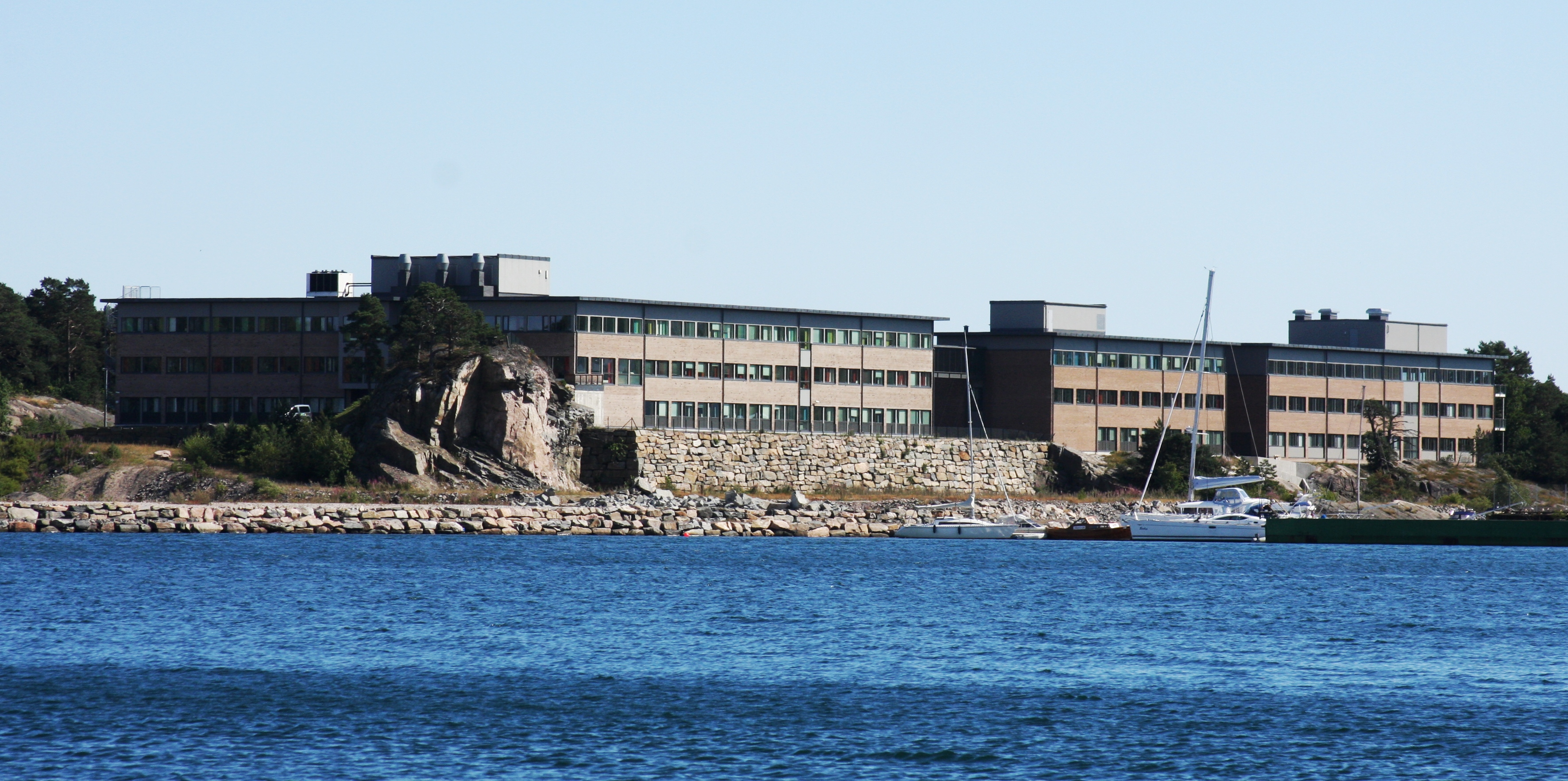
Andøya Industrial Park

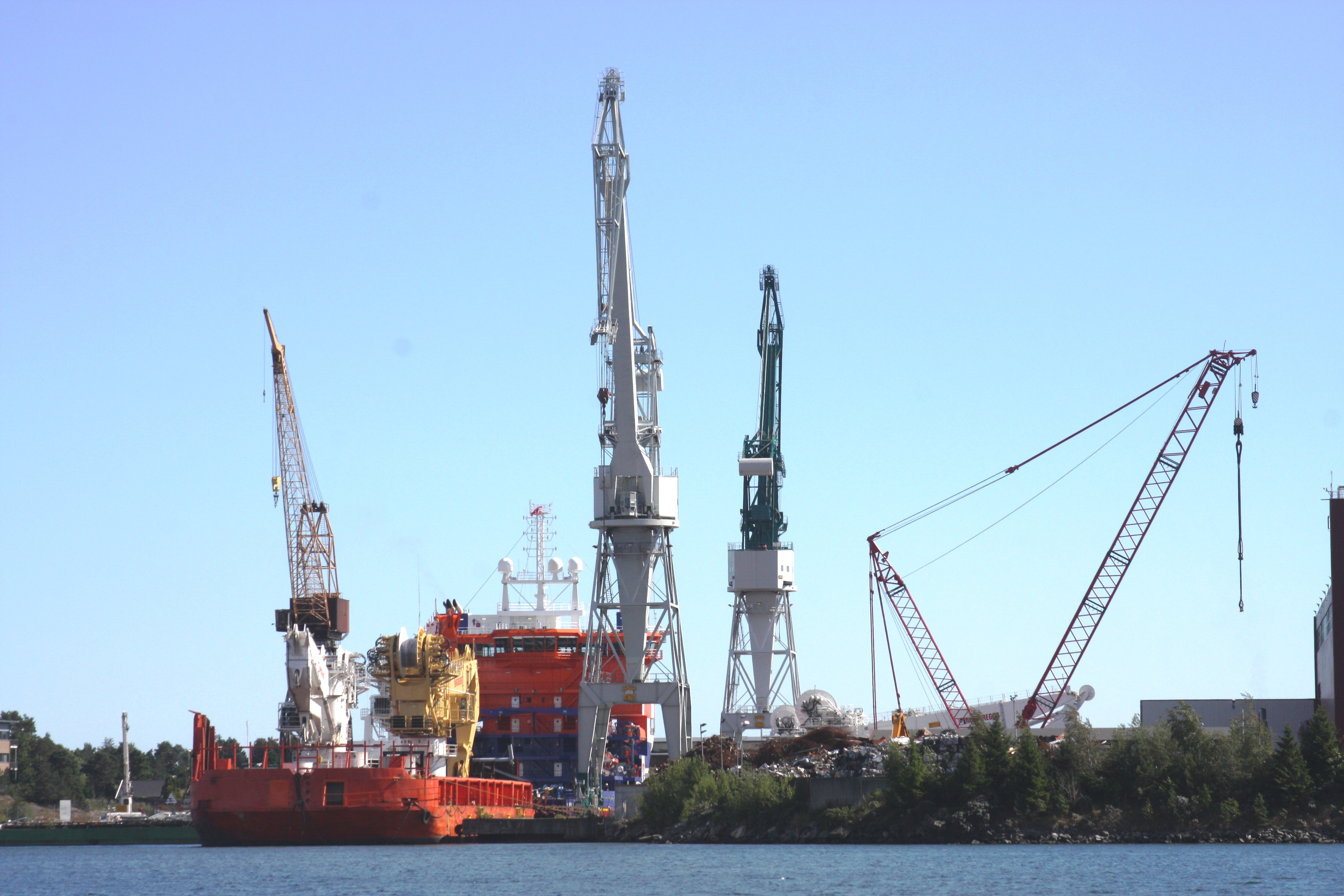
Andøya Industrial Park

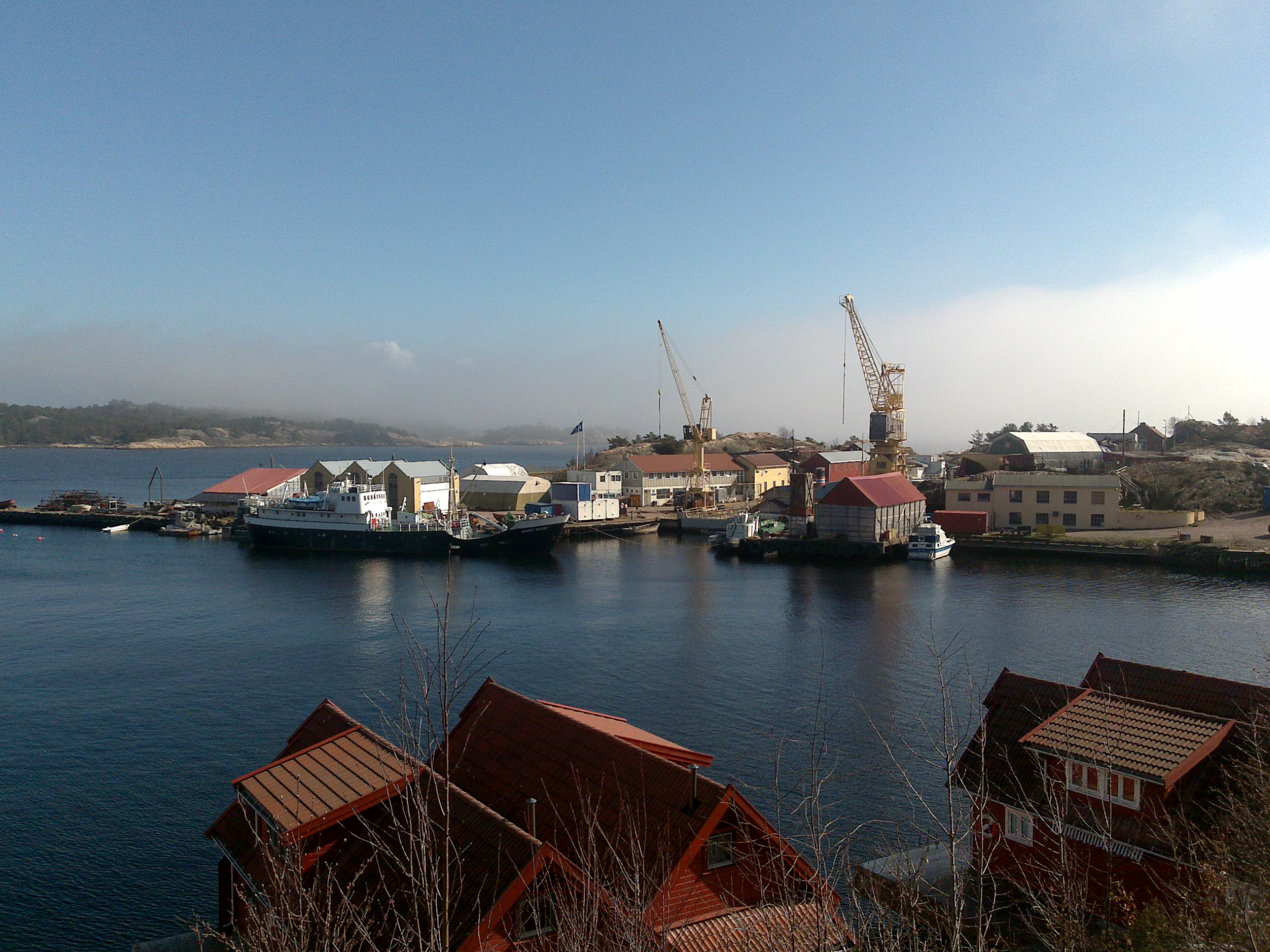
Norwegian Fartøyvernsener on Andøya

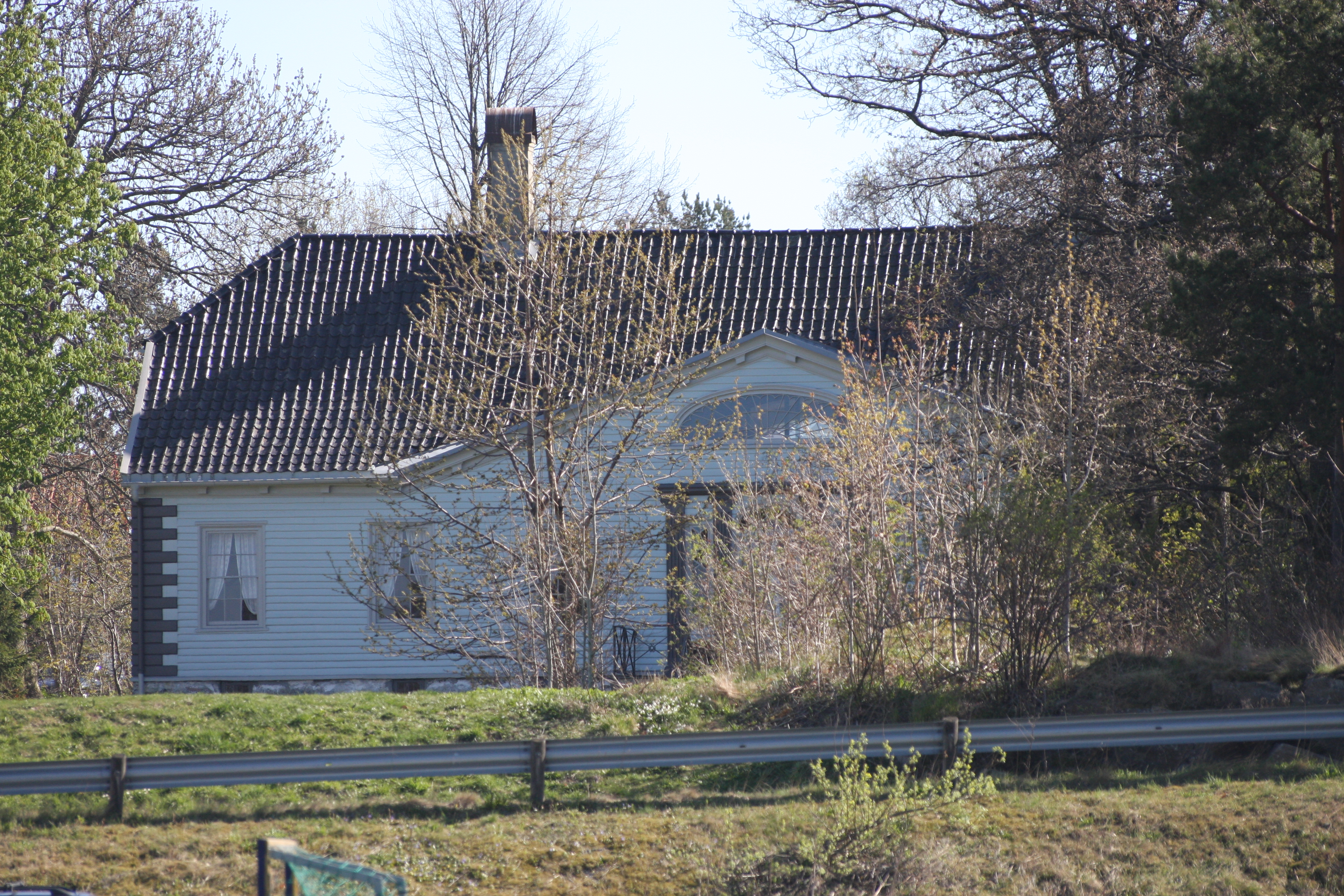
Andøya Gård

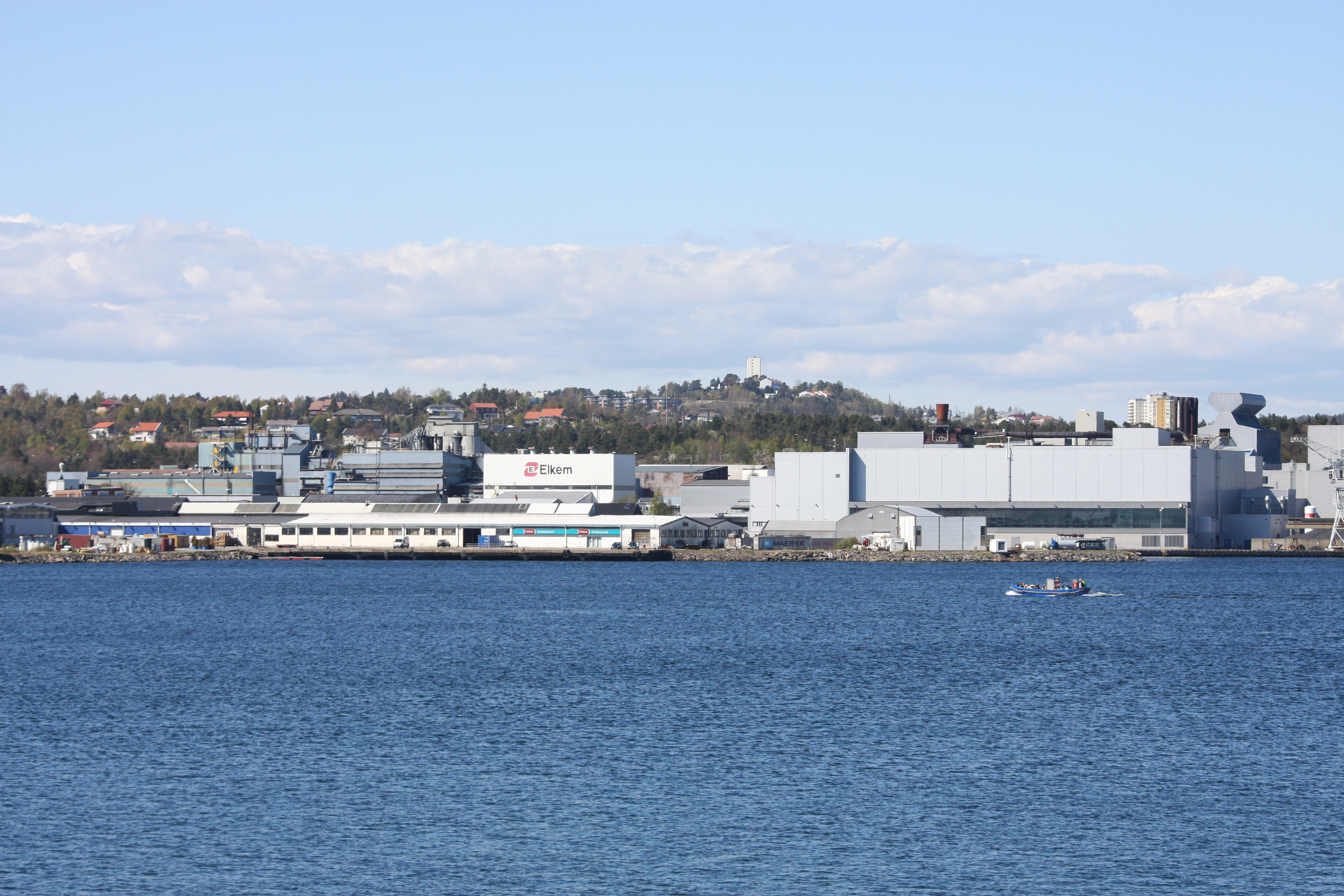
Elkem Solar at Fiskå Verk

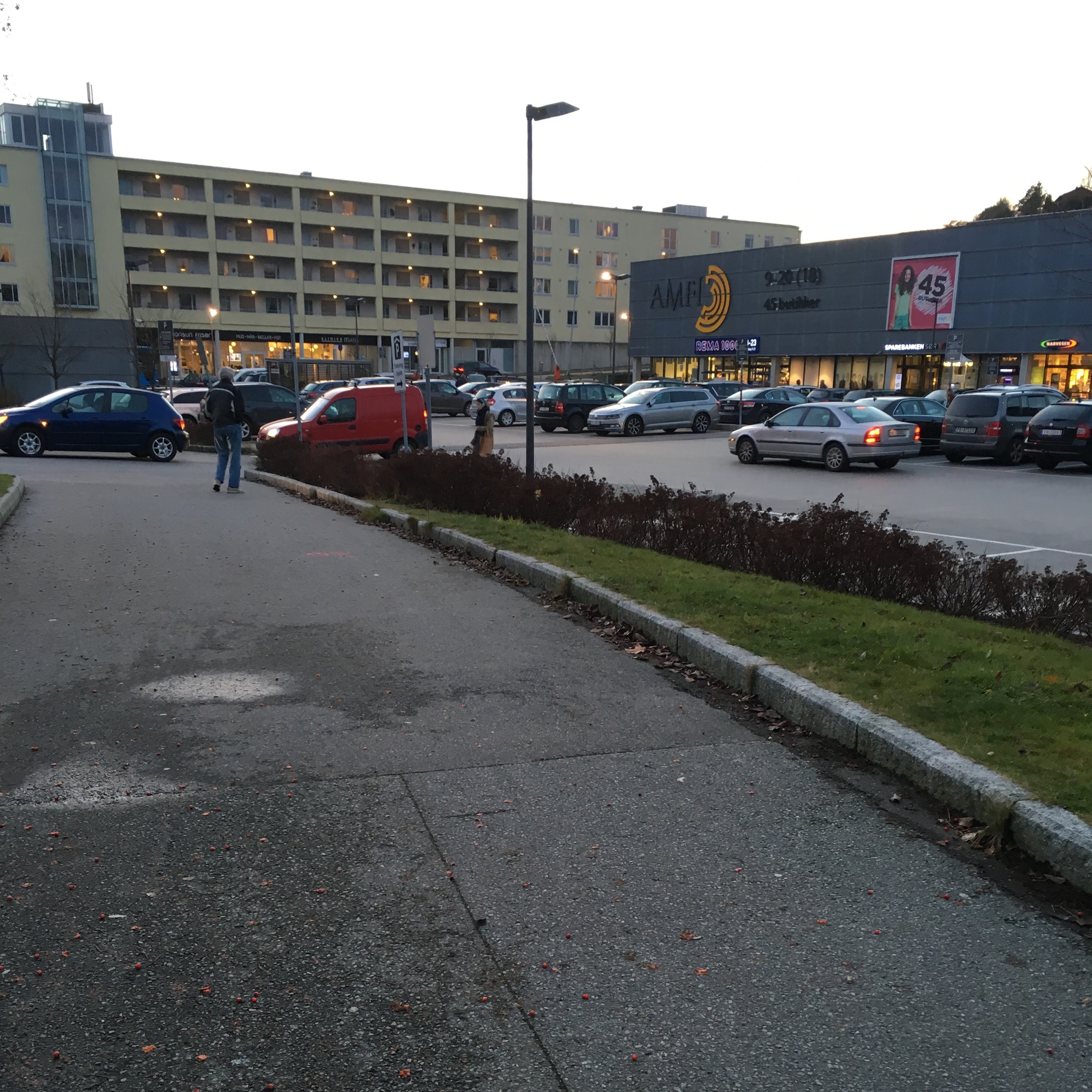
Vågsbygd Mall

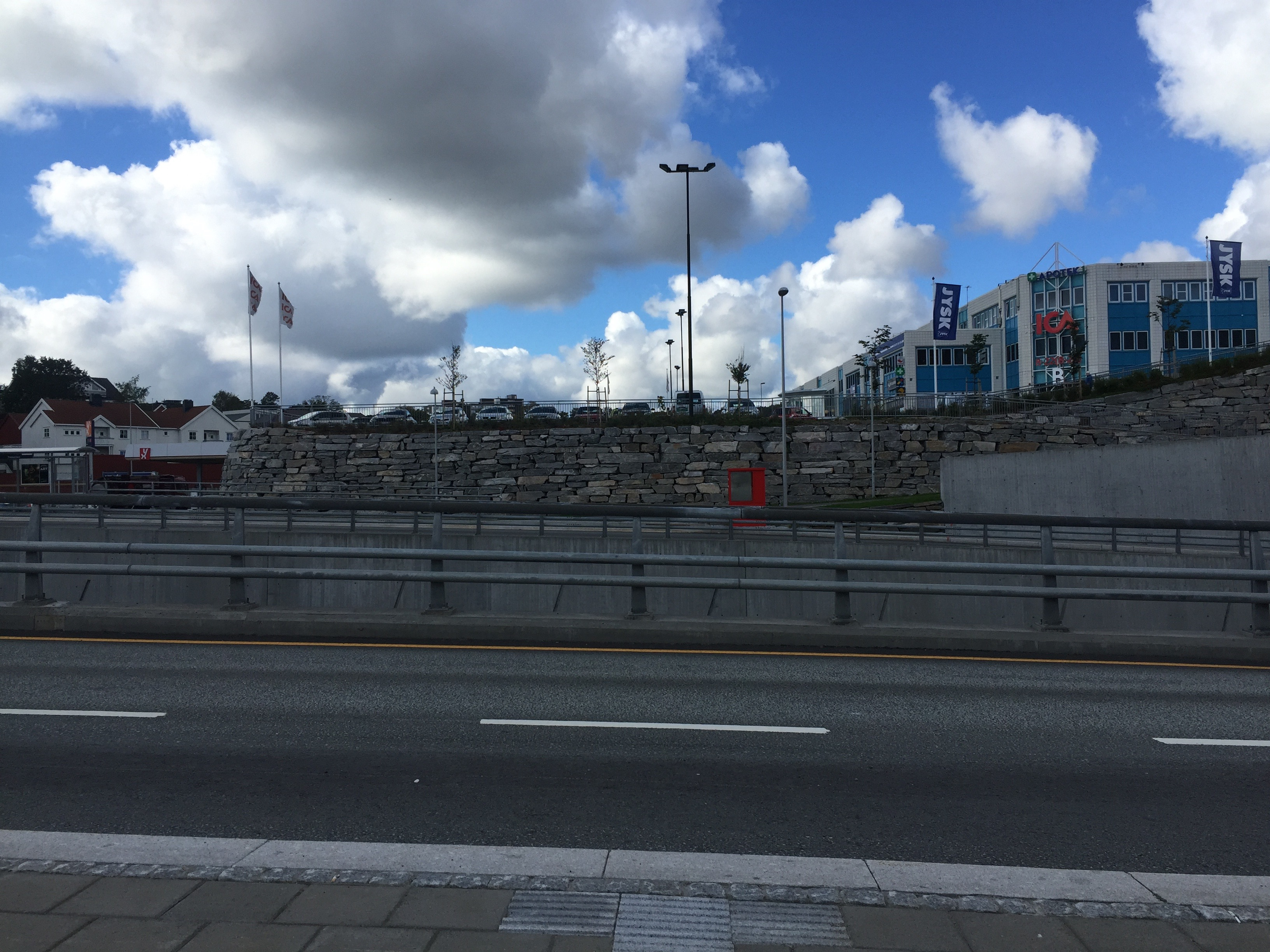
Trekanten Mall
