= Lumber (Kristiansand) =

- Neighborhood in Kristiansand
- Interactive map of Lumber
- Coordinates: 58.1242°N 07.9681°E
- Country: Norway
- County: Agder
- Municipality: Kristiansand
- Borough: Vågsbygd
- District: Vågsbygd
- Elevation: 3 m (9.8 ft)
- Time zone: UTC+01:00 (CET)
  - Summer (DST): UTC+02:00 (CEST)
- Postal code: 4621
- Area code: 38

Lumber is a neighbourhood in the city of Kristiansand in Agder county, Norway. It is located in the borough of Vågsbygd and in the district of Vågsbygd. Lumber is a large industrial area. It is north of Skyllingsheia, south of Trekanten, and east of Kjerrheia.

== Transportation ==
Roads through Lumber
Road	Stretch
Fv456	Hannevika - Søgne

Bus lines through Lumber
Line	Destinations
M1	Flekkerøy - Sørlandsparken Dyreparken - IKEA
M1	Flekkerøy - Kvadraturen
M2	Voiebyen - Hånes
M2	Voiebyen - Hånes - Lauvåsen
M2	Voiebyen - Hånes / Kjevik - Tveit
M2	Voiebyen - Kvadraturen
05	Andøya - Kvadraturen - UiA
09	Bråvann - Kvadraturen - UiA
50	Søgne - Kristiansand
D2	Voiebyen - Kvadraturen - UiA
