= Voielia =

- Neighborhood in Kristiansand
- Interactive map of Voielia
- Coordinates: 58.1080°N 07.9644°E
- Country: Norway
- County: Agder
- Municipality: Kristiansand
- Borough: Vågsbygd
- District: Voiebyen
- Elevation: 49 m (161 ft)
- Time zone: UTC+01:00 (CET)
  - Summer (DST): UTC+02:00 (CEST)
- Postal code: 4624
- Area code: 38

Voielia is a neighbourhood in the city of Kristiansand in Agder county, Norway. The neighborhood is located in the borough of Vågsbygd and in the district of Voiebyen. Voielia is north of Voietun, south of Rådyr, east of Bråvann, and west of Voieåsen.

== Transport ==
Roads through Voielia
Line	Destination
Norwegian County Road 456	Søgne - Voie

Bus lines from Voielia
Line	Destination
M2	Voiebyen - Hånes
M2	Voiebyen - Hånes - Lauvåsen
M2	Voiebyen - Hånes - Kjevik/Tveit
M2	Voiebyen - Kvadraturen
N2	Flekkerøy - Voiebyen - Kvadraturen
50	Kristiansand - Søgne
