= Rådyr (Kristiansand) =

- Neighborhood in Kristiansand
- Interactive map of Rådyr
- Coordinates: 58.1130°N 07.9498°E
- Country: Norway
- County: Agder
- Municipality: Kristiansand
- Borough: Vågsbygd
- District: Voiebyen
- Elevation: 14 m (46 ft)
- Time zone: UTC+01:00 (CET)
  - Summer (DST): UTC+02:00 (CEST)
- Postal code: 4624
- Area code: 38

Rådyr is a neighbourhood in the city of Kristiansand in Agder county, Norway. The neighborhood is located in the borough of Vågsbygd and in the district of Voiebyen. The neighborhood of Rådyr is north of Voielia, south of Kjos Haveby, east of Bråvann, and west of Kjosbukta.

== Transport ==
Roads through Rådyr
Line	Destination
Norwegian County Road 456	Søgne - Voie

Bus lines from Rådyr
Line	Destination
M2	Voiebyen - Hånes
M2	Voiebyen - Hånes - Lauvåsen
M2	Voiebyen - Hånes - Kjevik/Tveit
M2	Voiebyen - Kvadraturen
N2	Flekkerøy - Voiebyen - Kvadraturen
50	Kristiansand - Søgne
