= Voieåsen =

- Neighborhood in Kristiansand
- Interactive map of Voieåsen
- Coordinates: 58.1072°N 07.9613°E
- Country: Norway
- County: Agder
- Municipality: Kristiansand
- Borough: Vågsbygd
- District: Voiebyen
- Elevation: 56 m (184 ft)
- Time zone: UTC+01:00 (CET)
  - Summer (DST): UTC+02:00 (CEST)
- Postal code: 4623
- Area code: 38

Voieåsen is a neighbourhood in the city of Kristiansand in Agder county, Norway. The neighborhood is located in the borough of Vågsbygd and in the district of Voiebyen. Voieåsen is north of Møviklia, south of Voie, east of Voielia, and west of Møvik.

== Transport ==
Roads through Voieåsen
Line	Destination
County Road 457	Flekkerøy - Voie

Bus lines from Voieåsen
Line	Destination
M1	Flekkerøy - Sørlandsparken - Dyreparken IKEA
M1	Flekkerøy - Kvadraturen
M2	Voiebyen - Hånes
M2	Voiebyen - Hånes - Lauvåsen
M2	Voiebyen - Hånes - Kjevik/Tveit
M2	Voiebyen - Kvadraturen
N2	Flekkerøy - Voiebyen - Kvadraturen
