= Ternevig =

- Neighborhood in Kristiansand
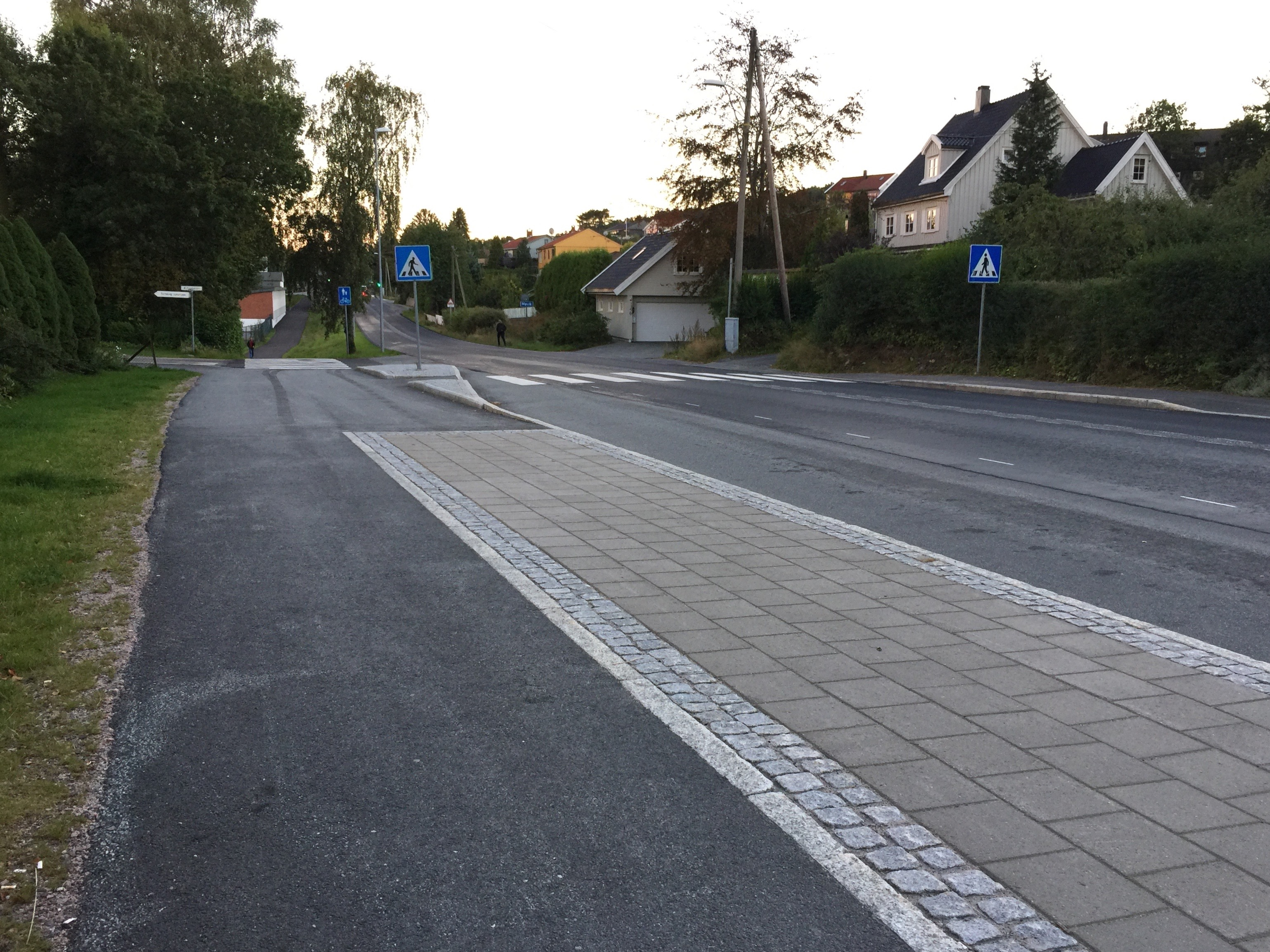
- View of the neighborhood
- Interactive map of Ternevig
- Coordinates: 58.1060°N 07.9771°E
- Country: Norway
- County: Agder
- Municipality: Kristiansand
- Borough: Vågsbygd
- District: Voiebyen
- Elevation: 0 m (0 ft)
- Time zone: UTC+01:00 (CET)
  - Summer (DST): UTC+02:00 (CEST)
- Postal code: 4623
- Area code: 38

Ternevig is a neighbourhood in the city of Kristiansand in Agder county, Norway. The neighborhood is located in the borough of Vågsbygd and in the district of Voiebyen. Ternevig is northeast of Møvik, southeast of Voie, east of Møviklia, and west of the ocean and the island of Andøya. There is a small hospital located in Ternevig serving the borough of Vågsbygd. There is also a marina located in this neighborhood.

== Transport ==
Roads through Ternevig
Line	Destination
County Road 457	Flekkerøy - Voie

Bus lines from Ternevig
Line	Destination
M1	Flekkerøy - Sørlandsparken - Dyreparken IKEA
M1	Flekkerøy - Kvadraturen
M2	Voiebyen - Hånes
M2	Voiebyen - Hånes - Lauvåsen
M2	Voiebyen - Hånes - Kjevik/Tveit
M2	Voiebyen - Kvadraturen
N2	Flekkerøy - Voiebyen - Kvadraturen
