= Hannevika =

Hannevika Hannevig / Hannevik
- Neighborhood in Kristiansand
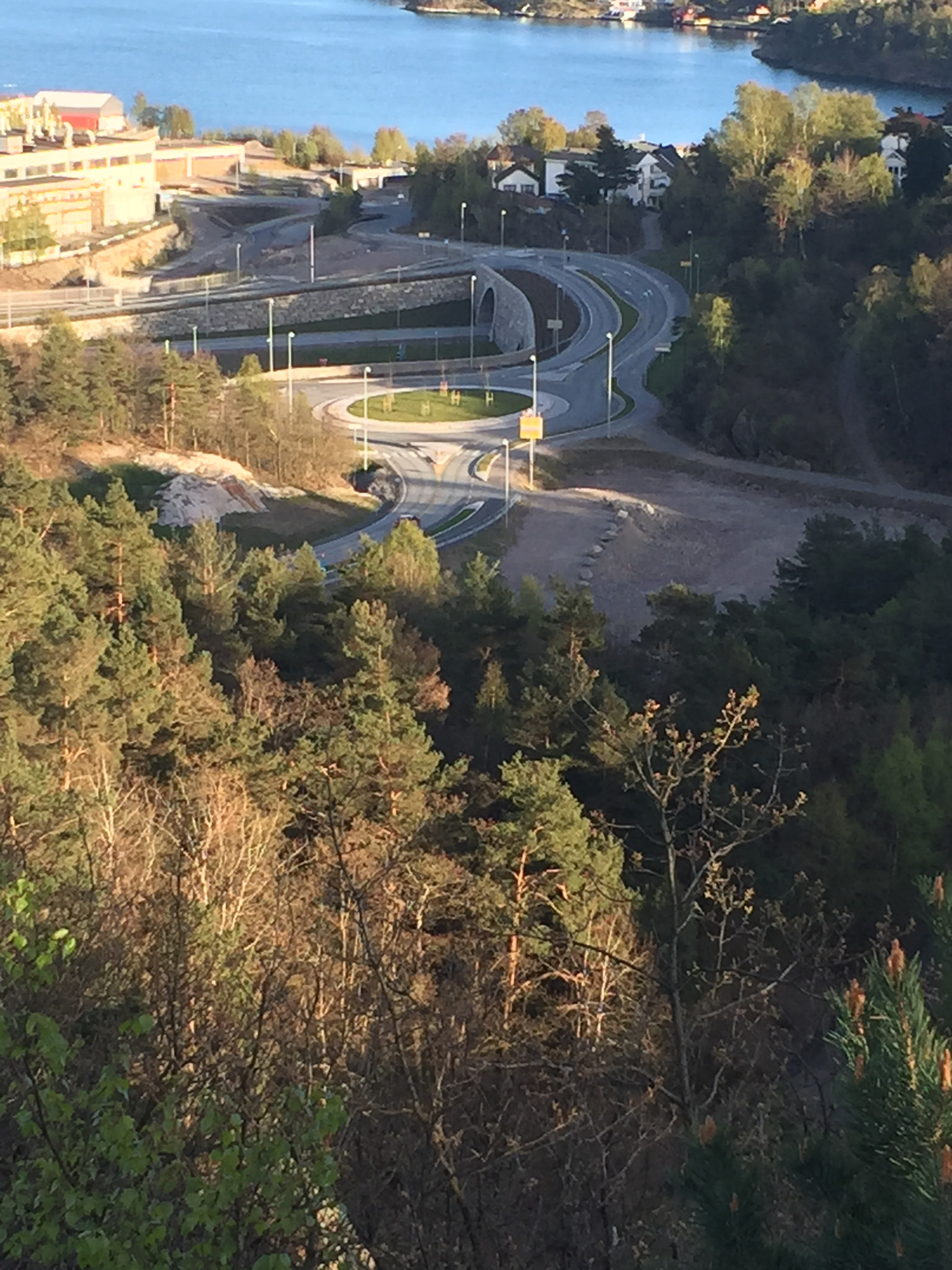
- View of the neighborhood
- Interactive map of Hannevika
- Coordinates: 58.1345°N 07.9606°E
- Country: Norway
- County: Agder
- Municipality: Kristiansand
- Borough: Grim
- District: Tinnheia
- Elevation: 56 m (184 ft)
- Time zone: UTC+01:00 (CET)
  - Summer (DST): UTC+02:00 (CEST)
- Postal code: 4629
- Area code: 38

Hannevika is a neighbourhood in the city of Kristiansand in Agder county, Norway. It is located in the borough of Grim and in the district of Tinnheia. The neighborhood is located along the European route E39 highway and the start of Norwegian County Road 456. Hannevika is a large industrial area. Glencore and Hennig-Olsen Iskremfabrikk are the two largest industries located there. Hannevika is located southeast of Eigevannskollen, northeast of Kartheia, and south of Kolsberg.

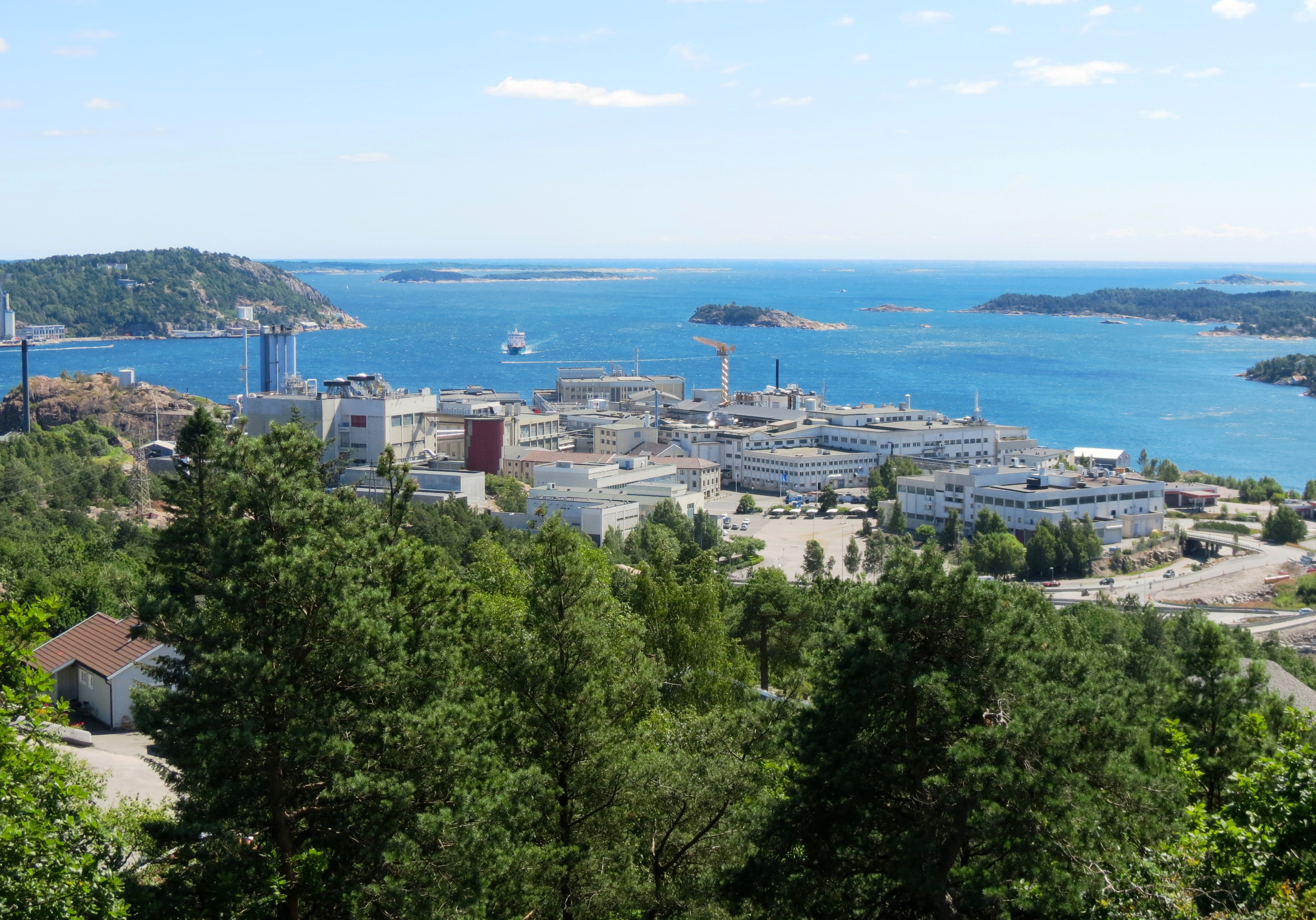
Hannevika industrial area

== Transportation ==
Roads through Hannevika
Line	Destination
E39	Denmark - Downtown - Stavanger
Fv456	Hannevika - Vågsbygd - Søgne

Hannevika is an important place for bus lines in Kristiansand, as it is a place to change bus for many.

Buses through Hannevika
Line	Destination	Info
D2	Voiebyen - Kvadraturen	Direct route
D3	Slettheia - Kvadraturen	Direct route
M1	Flekkerøy - Sørlandsparken-Dyreparken-IKEA	
M1	Flekkerøy - Kvadraturen	
M1	Flekkerøy - Dyreparken	Summer-season only
M2	Voiebyen - Hånes	
M2	Voiebyen - Hånes-Lauvåsen	
M2	Voiebyen - Hånes-Kjevik/Tveit	Sundays only
M2	Voiebyen - Kvadraturen	The last route
M3	Slettheia - Søm	
05	Andøya - Kvadraturen	
05	Andøya - Kvadraturen-UiA	Rush-hour
09	Bråvann - Kvadraturen	
09	Bråvann - Kvadraturen-UiA	Rush-hour
12	Kjos Haveby - Eg-Sykehuset	
17	Hellemyr - Tømmerstø	
17	Hellemyr - Tømmerstø-Frikstad	
17	Hellemyr - Kvadraturen	
18	Hellemyr - Tømmerstø-Odderhei Holte	
40	Kristiansand - Søgne (Høllen-Årosskogen)	
42	Kristiansand - Søgne (Langenes)	
45	Kristiansand - Nodelandsheia	
45	Kristiansand - Nodelansheia-Stokkeland	
46	Kristiansand - Nodeland-Finsland	
900	Kristiansand - Mandal	
900	Kristiansand - Mandal and Møll	
900	Kristiansand - Mandal-Lindesnes-Lyngdal-Farsund-Lista	Collaborate with bus to Flekkefjord and Kvinesdal
