= Løvika (Kristiansand) =

- Neighborhood in Kristiansand
- Interactive map of Løvika
- Coordinates: 58.1132°N 07.9864°E
- Country: Norway
- County: Agder
- Municipality: Kristiansand
- Borough: Vågsbygd
- District: Voiebyen
- Elevation: 9 m (30 ft)
- Time zone: UTC+01:00 (CET)
  - Summer (DST): UTC+02:00 (CEST)
- Postal code: 4623
- Area code: 38

Løvika is a neighbourhood in the city of Kristiansand in Agder county, Norway. The neighborhood is located in the borough of Vågsbygd and in the district of Voiebyen. It is located on the northeastern part of the island of Andøya. Løvika is east of Voie and northeast of Ternevig.

== Transport ==
Bus lines from Løvika
| Line | Destination |
|---|---|
| 05 | Andøya - Vågsbygd |
| 05 | Andøya - Kvadraturen |
| 05 | Andøya - Kvadraturen - UiA |
