= Trekanten (Kristiansand) =

- Neighborhood in Kristiansand
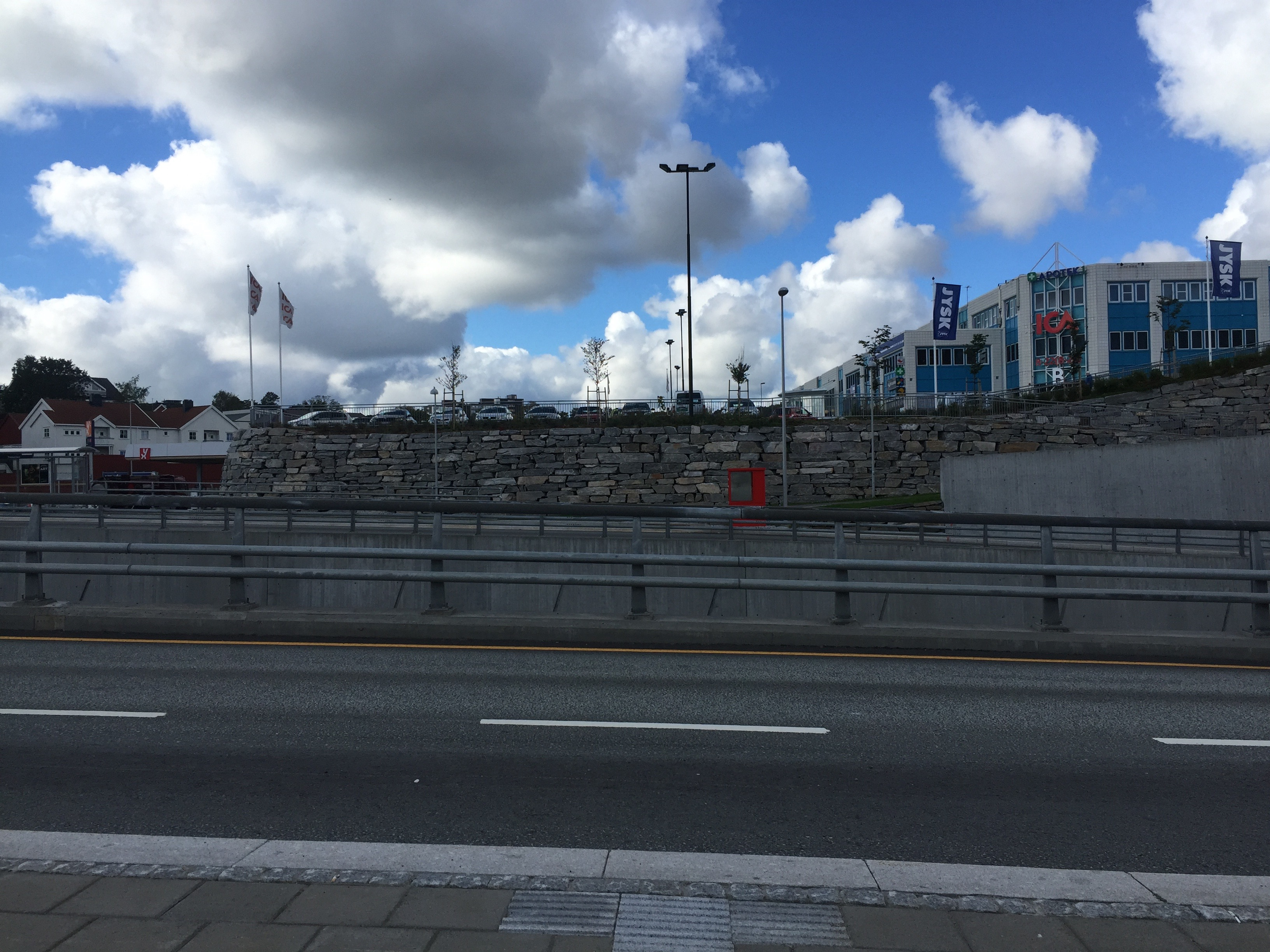
- View of the Fv456 road and Trekanten centre
- Interactive map of Trekanten
- Coordinates: 58.1292°N 07.9619°E
- Country: Norway
- County: Agder
- Municipality: Kristiansand
- Borough: Vågsbygd
- District: Slettheia
- Elevation: 19 m (62 ft)
- Time zone: UTC+01:00 (CET)
  - Summer (DST): UTC+02:00 (CEST)
- Postal code: 4621
- Area code: 38

Trekanten is a neighbourhood in the city of Kristiansand in Agder county, Norway. It is located in the borough of Vågsbygd and in the district of Slettheia. The neighborhood includes a large commercial area.

It is located around a triangle formed by the junction of three arterial roads within Vågsbygd borough in Slettheia (its name means The Triangle in English). Trekanten is next to Norwegian County Road 456, which in June 2014 was transferred into a new 1.3-kilometre (0.81 mi) dual carriageway tunnel emerging at Trekanten.

The centre contains various shops, offices, child welfare, and healthcare facilities.

== Transportation ==
Bus lines from Trekanten
Line	Destination
M1	Flekkerøy - Sørlandsparken-Dyreparken-IKEA
M1	Flekkerøy - Kvadraturen
M2	Voiebyen - Hånes
M2	Voiebyen - Hånes-Lauvåsen
M3	Slettheia - Søm
