= Skutevika =

- Neighborhood in Kristiansand
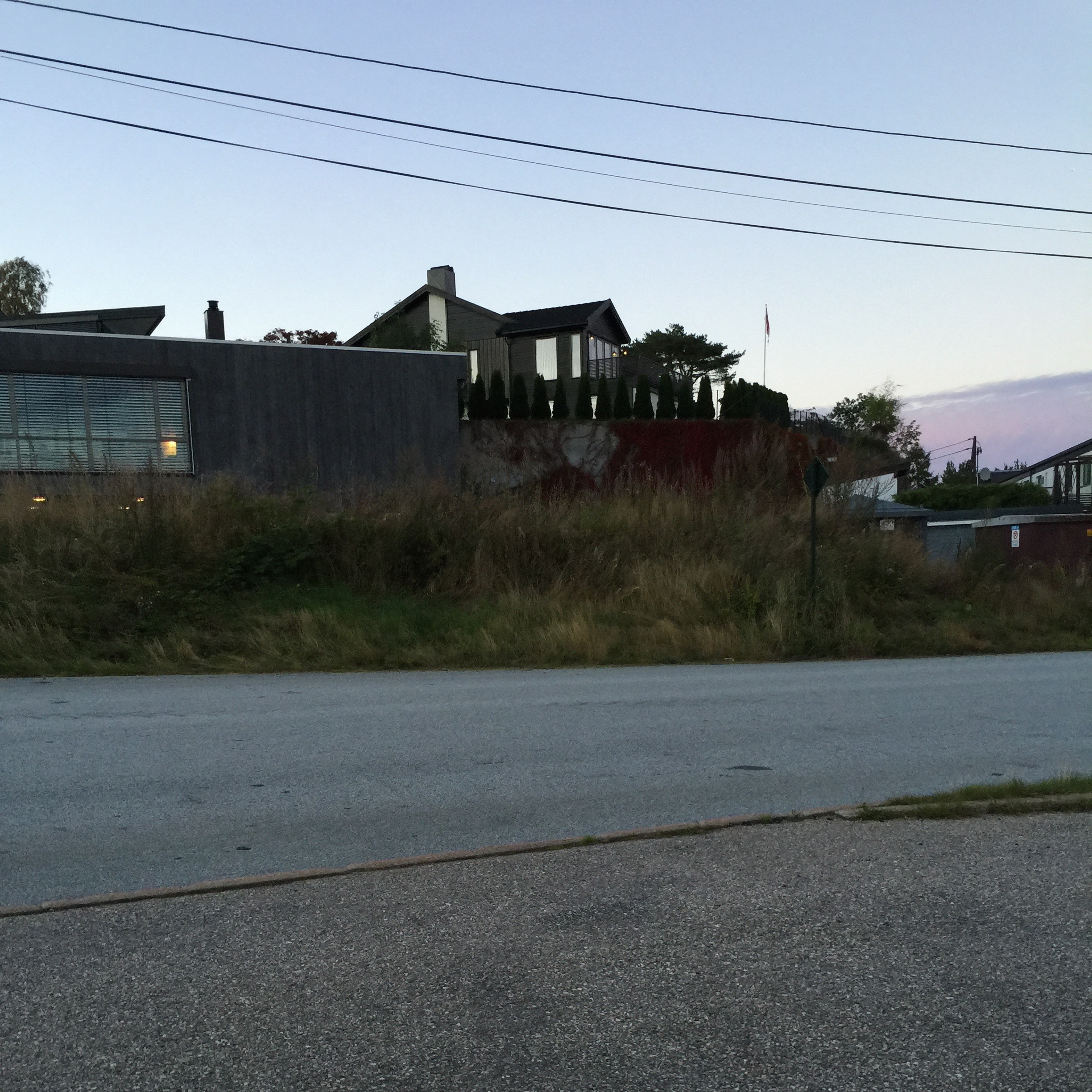
- View of the neighborhood
- Interactive map of Skutevika
- Coordinates: 58.1067°N 07.9448°E
- Country: Norway
- County: Agder
- Municipality: Kristiansand
- Borough: Vågsbygd
- District: Voiebyen
- Time zone: UTC+01:00 (CET)
  - Summer (DST): UTC+02:00 (CEST)
- Postal code: 4623
- Area code: 38

Skutevika is a neighbourhood in the city of Kristiansand in Agder county, Norway. The neighborhood is located in the borough of Vågsbygd and in the district of Voiebyen. Skutevika is north of Kroodden, south of Møviklia, east of Steindalen, and west of Spinneren.

== Transport ==
Roads through Skutevika
Line	Destination
County Road 457	Flekkerøy - Voie

Bus lines from Skutevika
Line	Destination
M1	Flekkerøy - Sørlandsparken - Dyreparken IKEA
M1	Flekkerøy - Kvadraturen
M2	Voiebyen - Hånes
M2	Voiebyen - Hånes - Lauvåsen
M2	Voiebyen - Hånes - Kjevik/Tveit
M2	Voiebyen - Kvadraturen
N2	Flekkerøy - Voiebyen - Kvadraturen
