= Steindalen =

- Neighborhood in Kristiansand
- Interactive map of Steindalen
- Coordinates: 58.1017°N 07.9498°E
- Country: Norway
- County: Agder
- Municipality: Kristiansand
- Borough: Vågsbygd
- District: Voiebyen
- Elevation: 51 m (167 ft)
- Time zone: UTC+01:00 (CET)
  - Summer (DST): UTC+02:00 (CEST)
- Postal code: 4624
- Area code: 38

Steindalen is a neighbourhood in the city of Kristiansand in Agder county, Norway. The neighborhood is located in the borough of Vågsbygd and in the district of Voiebyen. Steindalen is north of Kroodden, south of Voieåsen, east of Voietun, and west of Møviklia.

== Transport ==
Roads through Steindalen
Line	Destination
County Road 457	Flekkerøy - Voie

Bus lines from Steindalen
Line	Destination
M1	Flekkerøy - Sørlandsparken - Dyreparken IKEA
M1	Flekkerøy - Kvadraturen
M2	Voiebyen - Hånes
M2	Voiebyen - Hånes - Lauvåsen
M2	Voiebyen - Hånes - Kjevik/Tveit
M2	Voiebyen - Kvadraturen
N2	Flekkerøy - Voiebyen - Kvadraturen
