= Voietun =

- Neighborhood in Kristiansand
- Interactive map of Voietun
- Coordinates: 58.1053°N 07.9594°E
- Country: Norway
- County: Agder
- Municipality: Kristiansand
- Borough: Vågsbygd
- District: Voiebyen
- Time zone: UTC+01:00 (CET)
  - Summer (DST): UTC+02:00 (CEST)
- Postal code: 4624
- Area code: 38

Voietun is a neighbourhood in the city of Kristiansand in Agder county, Norway. The neighborhood is located in the borough of Vågsbygd and in the district of Voiebyen. Voietun is south of Voielia and west of Steindalen.

== Transport ==
Bus lines from Voietun
Line	Destination
M2	Voiebyen - Hånes
M2	Voiebyen - Hånes - Lauvåsen
M2	Voiebyen - Hånes - Kjevik/Tveit
M2	Voiebyen - Kvadraturen
N2	Flekkerøy - Voiebyen - Kvadraturen
