= Grovikheia =

- Neighborhood in Kristiansand
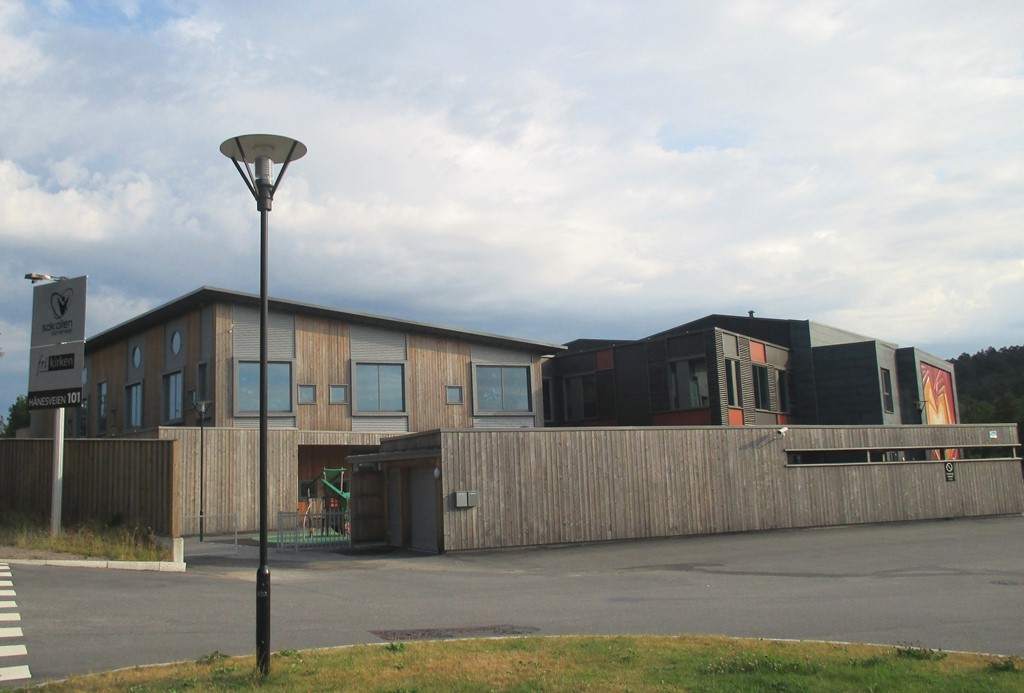
- View of the Hånes Free Church at Grovikheia
- Interactive map of Grovikheia
- Coordinates: 58.1841°N 08.0905°E
- Country: Norway
- County: Agder
- Municipality: Kristiansand
- Borough: Oddernes
- District: Hånes
- Elevation: 60 m (200 ft)
- Time zone: UTC+01:00 (CET)
  - Summer (DST): UTC+02:00 (CEST)
- Postal code: 4635
- Area code: 38

Grovikheia is a neighbourhood in the city of Kristiansand in Agder county, Norway. It is a part of the borough of Oddernes and in the district of Hånes. It is located along the Norwegian National Road 41 and it is north of the Hånni neighborhood and northwest of Lauvåsen. The name Grovikheia comes from the cove Grovika.

There is a Bible school located at Grovikheia and the closest school is Heståsen skole which is an elementary school. Bus line M2 goes through Vigvoll continuing to Hånes, Voiebyen, and Sørlandsparken.
