= Vigvoll =

- Neighborhood in Kristiansand
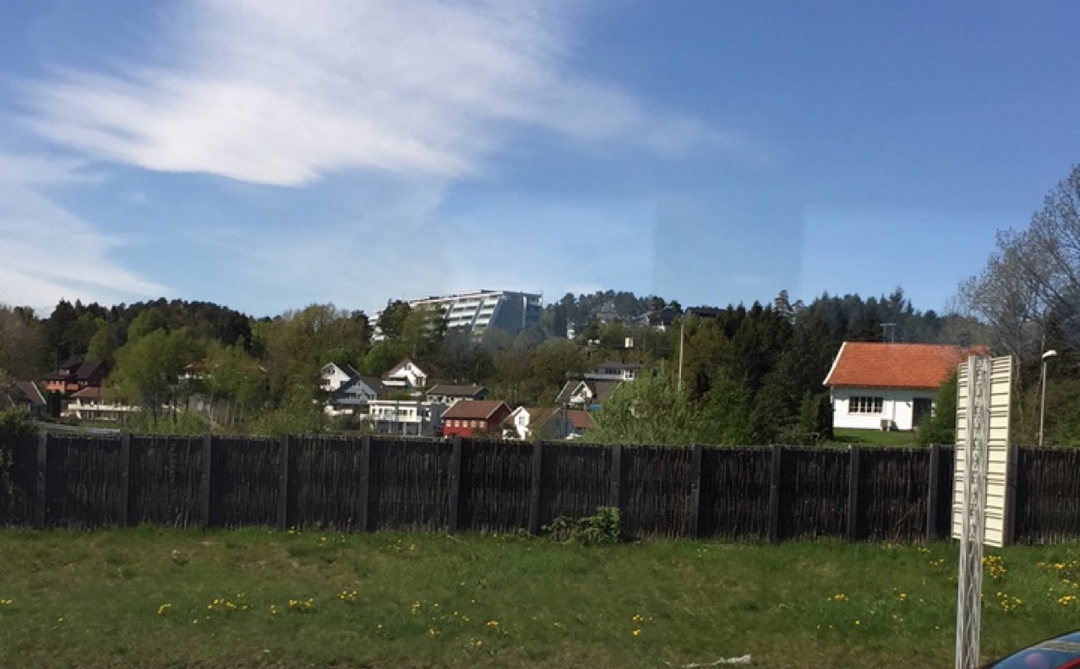
- View of the neighborhood
- Interactive map of Vigvoll
- Coordinates: 58.1758°N 08.0895°E
- Country: Norway
- County: Agder
- Municipality: Kristiansand
- Borough: Oddernes
- District: Hånes
- Elevation: 39 m (128 ft)
- Time zone: UTC+01:00 (CET)
  - Summer (DST): UTC+02:00 (CEST)
- Postal code: 463*
- Area code: 38

Vigvoll is a neighborhood in the city of Kristiansand in Agder county, Norway. It is a part of the Oddernes borough and the district of Hånes. The neighborhood lies north of the European route E18 highway, west of the Norwegian National Road 41, and east of the Topdalsfjorden. Vigvoll skole is the only junior high at Hånes. Bus line M2 goes through Vigvoll continuing to Hånes, Voiebyen, or Sørlandsparken. It includes a small shopping area known locally as Hånni.

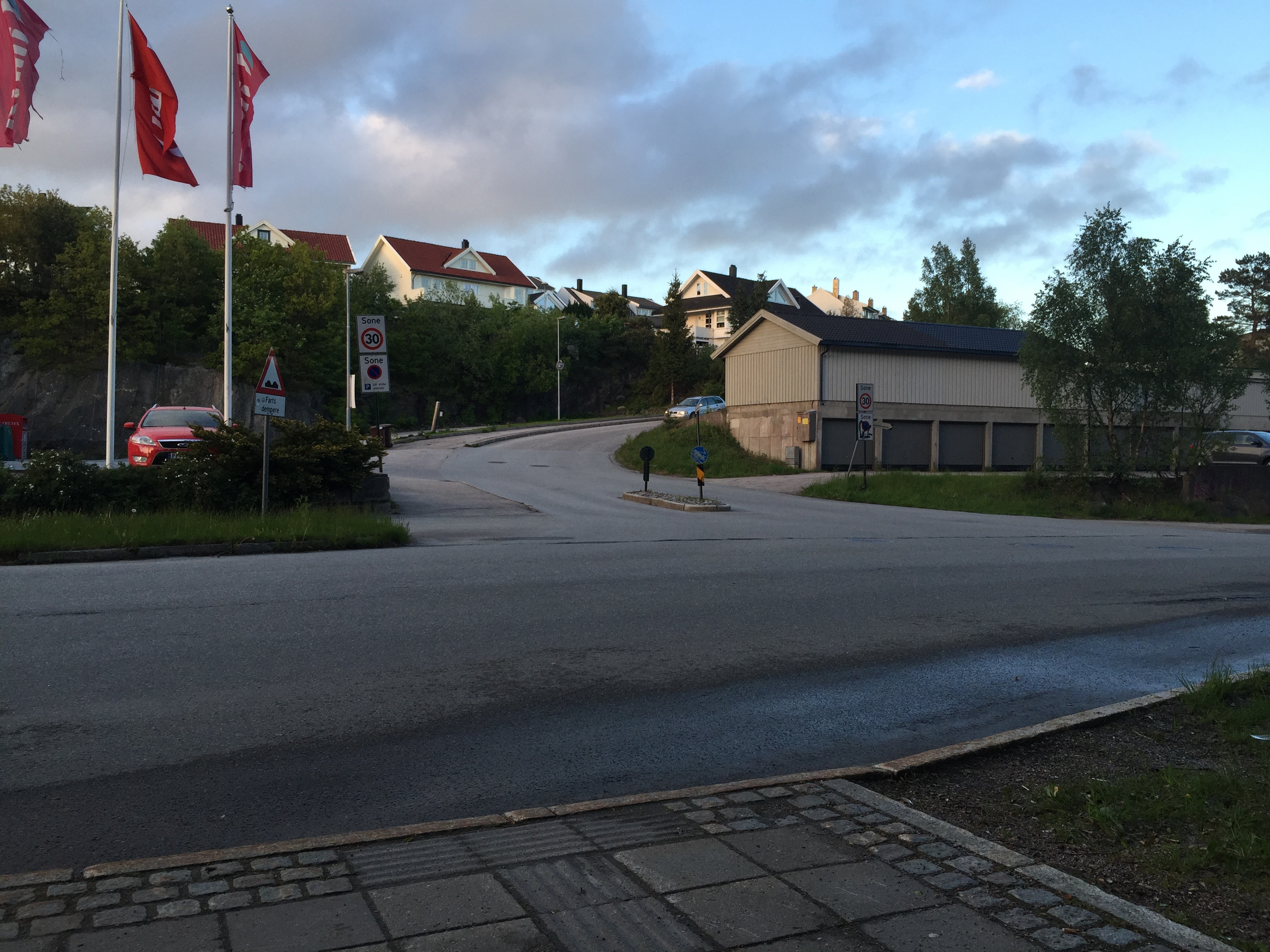
A view of the area outside the local supermarket
