= Voie Church =

Church in Agder, Norway

- Voie kirke
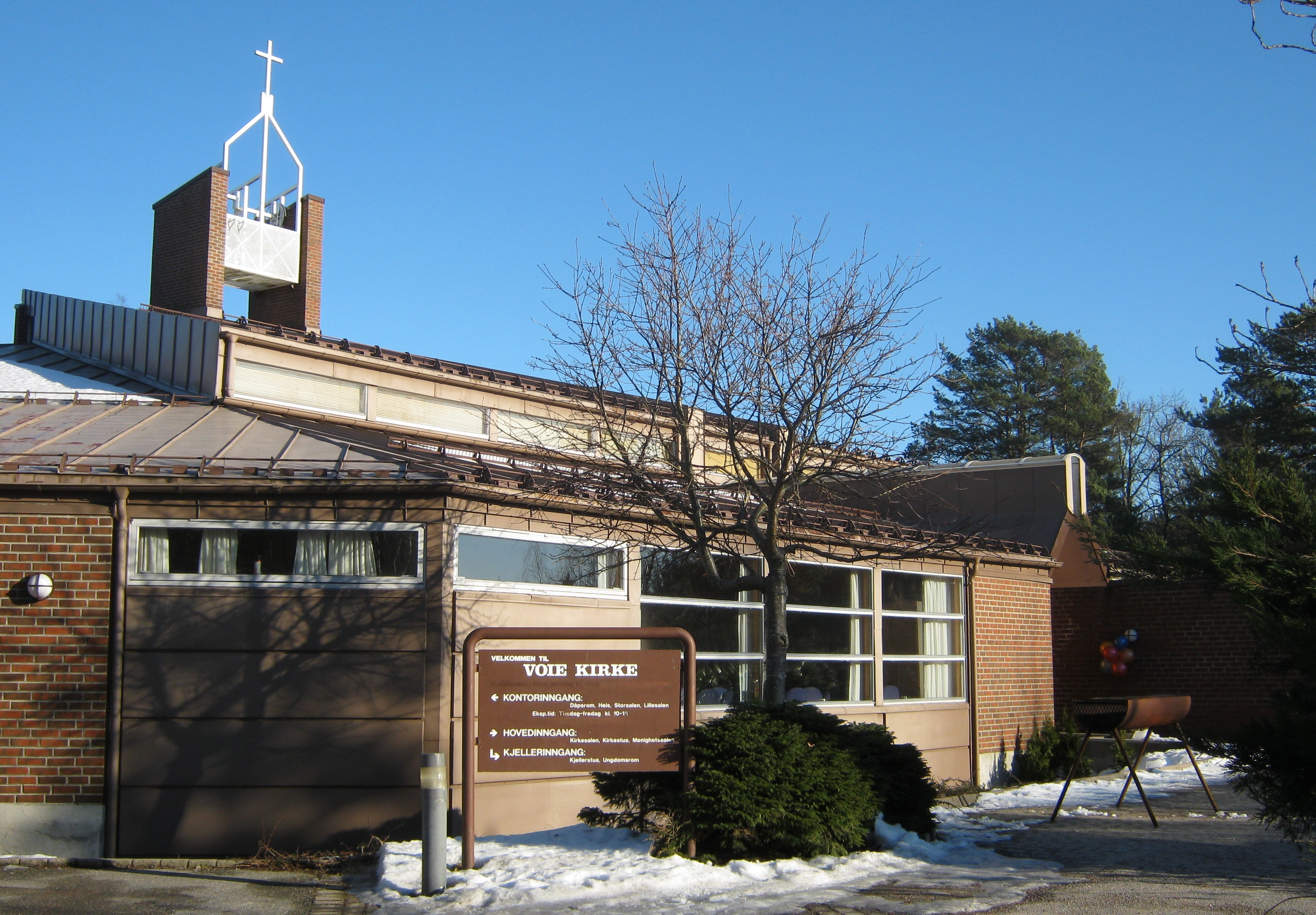
- View of the church
- Voie Church
- 58.100434°N 07.95537°E
- Location: Kristiansand Municipality, Agder
- Country: Norway
- Denomination: Church of Norway
- Churchmanship: Evangelical Lutheran

History
- Status: Parish church
- Founded: 1982
- Consecrated: 10 June 1990

Architecture
- Functional status: Active
- Architect: Arild Lauvland
- Architectural type: Fan-shaped
- Completed: 1990 (36 years ago)

Specifications
- Capacity: 300
- Materials: Brick

Administration
- Diocese: Agder og Telemark
- Deanery: Kristiansand domprosti
- Parish: Voie
- Norwegian Cultural Heritage Site
- Type: Church
- Status: Not protected

Voie Church (Norwegian: Voie kirke) is a parish church of the Church of Norway in Kristiansand Municipality in Agder county, Norway. It is located in the Møvik neighborhood in the district of Voiebyen in the borough of Vågsbygd in the city of Kristiansand. It is the church for the Voie parish which is part of the Kristiansand domprosti (arch-deanery) in the Diocese of Agder og Telemark. The red, brick church was built in a fan-shaped design in 1990 using plans drawn up by the architect Arild Lauvland. The church seats about 300 people, but it can be expanded to about 500 people.

== History ==
Voie parish was separated from Vågsbygd parish in 1978. The foundation stone was laid on 8 May 1982. The first construction phase was to complete a temporary church on the site and this was consecrated on 12 December 1982. By 1989, enough funds had been raised to begin the second construction phase which was to construct the permanent (much larger) church. The new building was consecrated on 10 June 1990. In 2012, the church was expanded to include more office space as well as a new parking area to the east and a new cemetery to the south.

== See also ==
- List of churches in Agder og Telemark
