= Hånes Church =

Church in Agder, Norway

- Hånes kirke
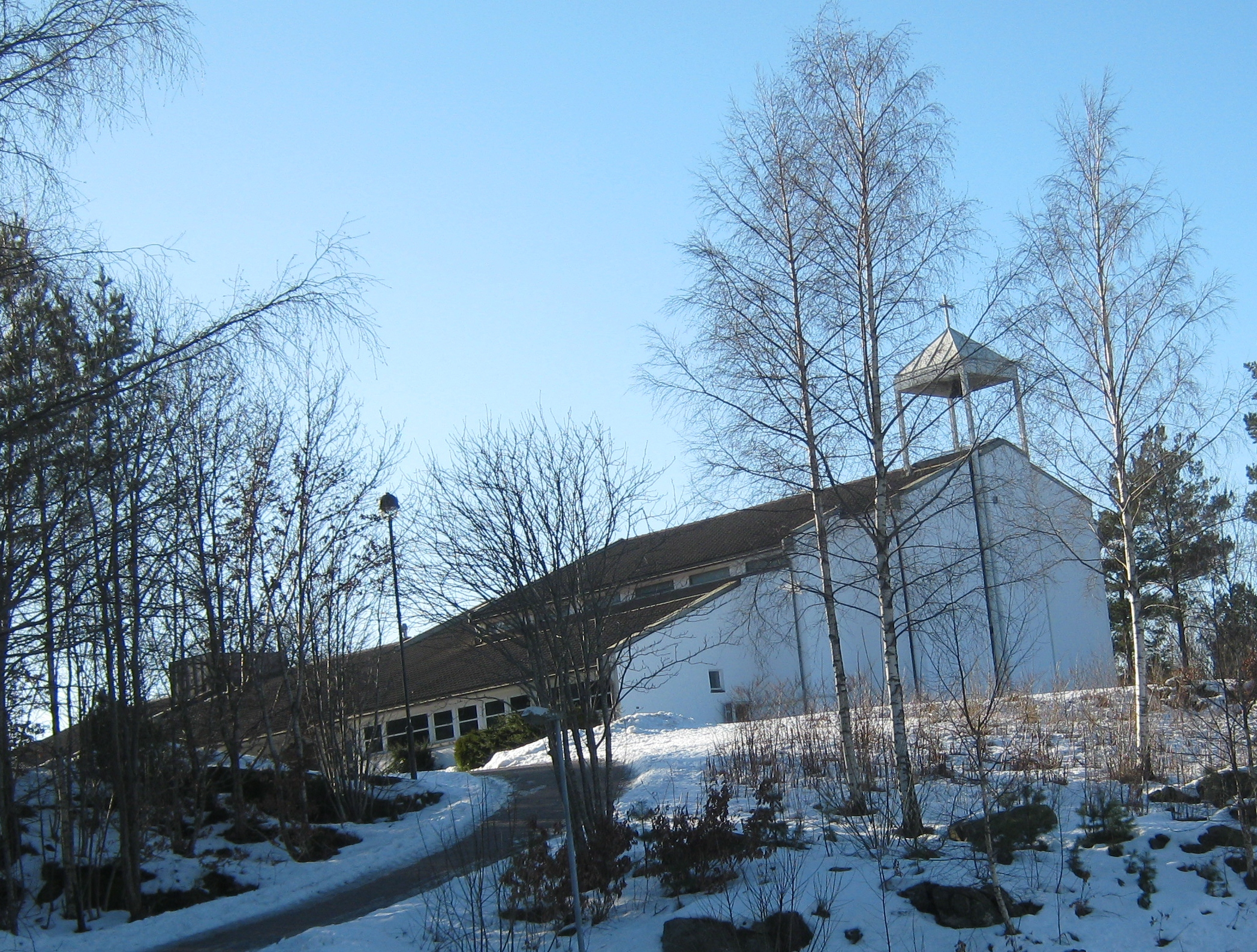
- View of the church
- Hånes Church
- 58.177079°N 08.092219°E
- Location: Kristiansand Municipality, Agder
- Country: Norway
- Denomination: Church of Norway
- Churchmanship: Evangelical Lutheran

History
- Status: Parish church
- Founded: 1986
- Consecrated: 1986

Architecture
- Functional status: Active
- Architect: Arild Lauvland
- Architectural type: Rectangular
- Completed: 1986 (40 years ago)

Specifications
- Capacity: 200
- Materials: Concrete

Administration
- Diocese: Agder og Telemark
- Deanery: Kristiansand domprosti
- Parish: Hånes

Hånes Church (Norwegian: Hånes kirke) is a parish church of the Church of Norway in Kristiansand Municipality in Agder county, Norway. It is located in the district of Hånes in the borough of Oddernes in the eastern part of the city of Kristiansand. It is the church for the Hånes parish which is part of the Kristiansand domprosti (arch-deanery) in the Diocese of Agder og Telemark. The white, concrete church was built in a rectangular design in 1986 using plans drawn up by the architect Arild Lauvland. The church seats about 200 people.

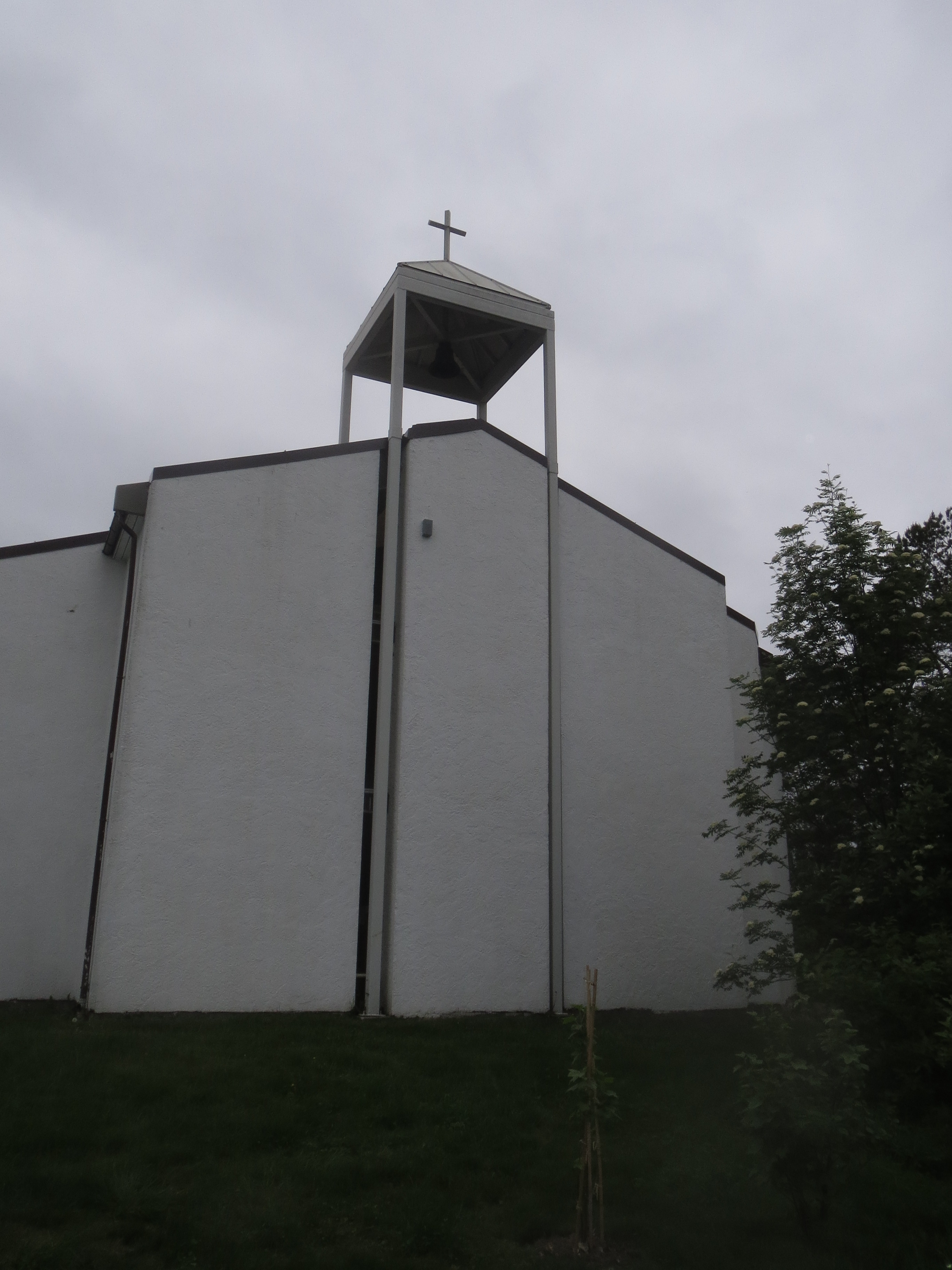
View of the church tower

The church was founded in 1986. In 2004, the church was expanded to include several more office spaces. In 2010, the sanctuary was renovated.

== See also ==
- List of churches in Agder og Telemark
