= Hennig-Olsen Iskremfabrikk =

Ice cream factory in Kristiansand, Norway

Coordinates: 58°8′8.93″N 7°57′54.33″E

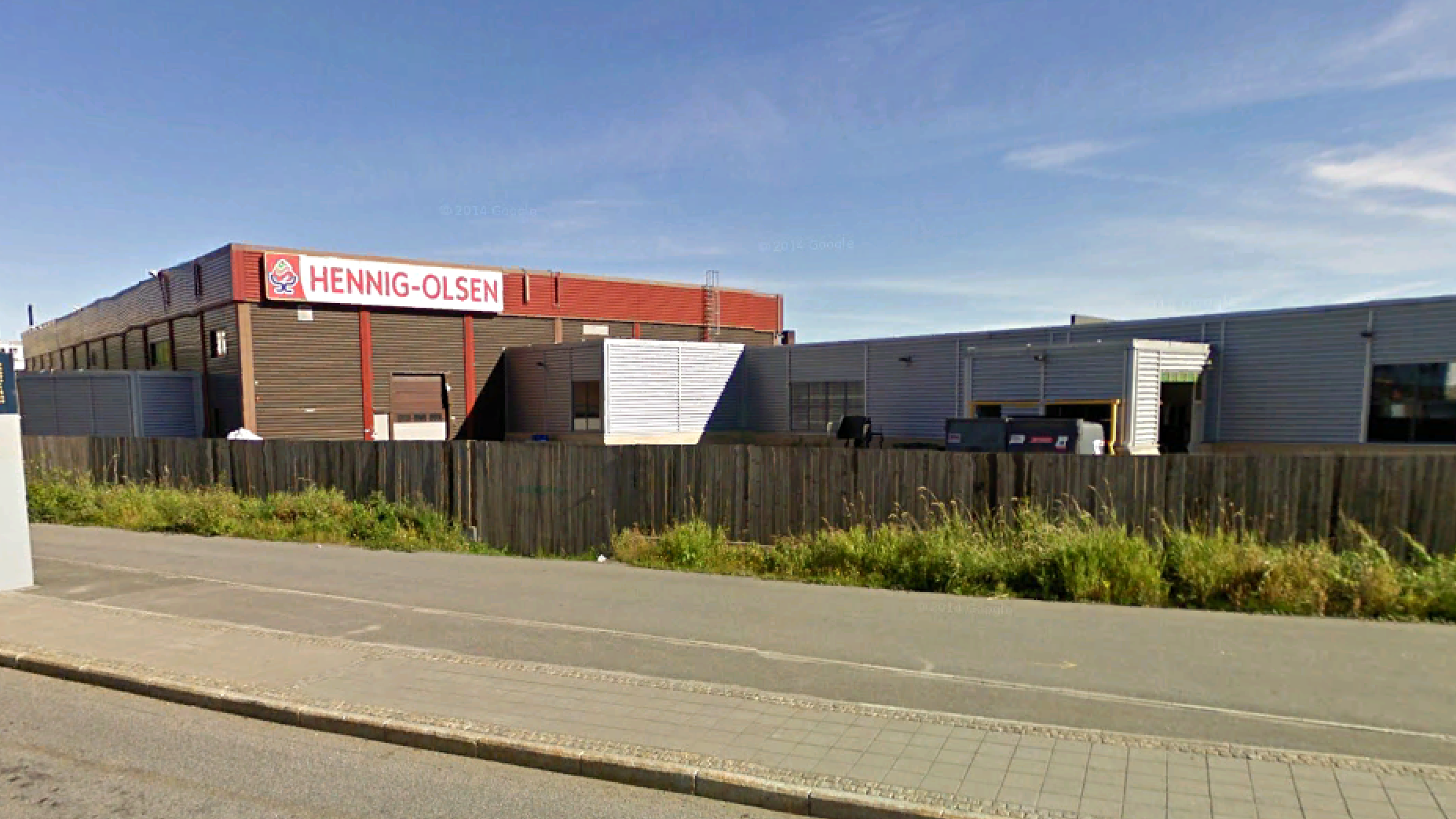
Hennig-Olsen ice cream factory, Hannevika in Kristiansand

Hennig-Olsen Is AS is a family-owned and operated ice cream factory in Kristiansand, Norway. The main product is ice cream, of which it produces more than 20 different types.

Ice cream from Hennig-Olsen has its roots back to 1924. Kristiansand resident Sven Hennig-Olsen (1899–1945) learned the art of making ice cream during a stay in Chicago. When he returned to his hometown in 1924, he brought with him equipment and recipes. Ice cream production began in the tobacco kiosk he started in Kristiansand. The ice cream factory was opened in 1960.

Management of the company was later passed on to Otto Johan Hennig-Olsen, Sven's son. Hennig-Olsen is now in its third generation, with Paal Hennig-Olsen as president and Espen Hennig-Olsen as marketing director. It is one of the few family businesses that has survived within the Norwegian food industry. In 2005, Hennig-Olsen had a total market share in Norway of around 46%.
