= Voie =

- Neighborhood in Kristiansand
- Interactive map of Voie
- Coordinates: 58.1122°N 07.9648°E
- Country: Norway
- County: Agder
- Municipality: Kristiansand
- Borough: Vågsbygd
- District: Voiebyen
- Elevation: 21 m (69 ft)
- Time zone: UTC+01:00 (CET)
  - Summer (DST): UTC+02:00 (CEST)
- Postal code: 4623
- Area code: 38

Voie is a neighbourhood in the city of Kristiansand in Agder county, Norway. The neighborhood is located in the borough of Vågsbygd and in the district of Voiebyen. Voie lies along Norwegian County Road 456 and County Road 457. The only road to the island of Andøya goes past the neighborhood of Voie. It lies northwest of Møvik and northeast of Steindalen.

Bus lines from Voie
Line	Destination
M1	Flekkerøy–Sørlandsparken–Dyreparken–IKEA
M1	Flekkerøy–Kvadraturen
M2	Voiebyen–Hånes
M2	Voiebyen–Hånes–Lauvåsen
50	Kristiansand–Søgne
