= Bråvann =

- Neighborhood in Kristiansand
- Interactive map of Bråvann
- Coordinates: 58.1098°N 07.9347°E
- Country: Norway
- County: Agder
- Municipality: Kristiansand
- Borough: Vågsbygd
- District: Voiebyen
- Elevation: 63 m (207 ft)
- Time zone: UTC+01:00 (CET)
  - Summer (DST): UTC+02:00 (CEST)

Bråvann is a neighbourhood in the city of Kristiansand in Agder county, Norway. The neighborhood is located in the borough of Vågsbygd and in the district of Voiebyen. The neighbourhood is located in the western part of the district at the top of a hill and consists mostly of large households. It lies to the west of Rådyr and northwest of Skutevika.
