= Norwegian County Road 456 =

Road in Agder county, Norway

County Road 456
- Bokmål: Fylkesvei 456; Nynorsk: Fylkesveg 456

Route information
- Maintained by Norwegian Public Roads Administration
- Length: 19.8 km (12.3 mi)
- Existed: 2010–present

Major junctions
- North end: E39 in Hannevika, Kristiansand
- Fv457 in Voiebyen, Kristiansand
- South end: E39 in Tangvall, Søgne

Location
- Country: Norway

Highway system
- Roads in Norway; National Roads; County Roads
← Fv455	→ Fv457

Norwegian County Road 456 (Fv456) is a Norwegian county road in Agder, Norway. The road takes over for European route E39 in Hannevika, Kristiansand, in to the borough Vågsbygd. Therefore this part is called the Vågsbygdporten and goes through a tunnel under Slettheia. The road continues south through Vågsbygd and goes west when it comes to Voiebyen. It then goes past Bråvann and into Søgne. In Søgne, the road goes through Langenes and is therefore called Langenesveien or Langenessletta. County Road 456 goes past places like the church in Søgne and the only high school in Søgne. The road ends in Søgne centrum, Tangvall. It leads through the centre and stops with E39 again.

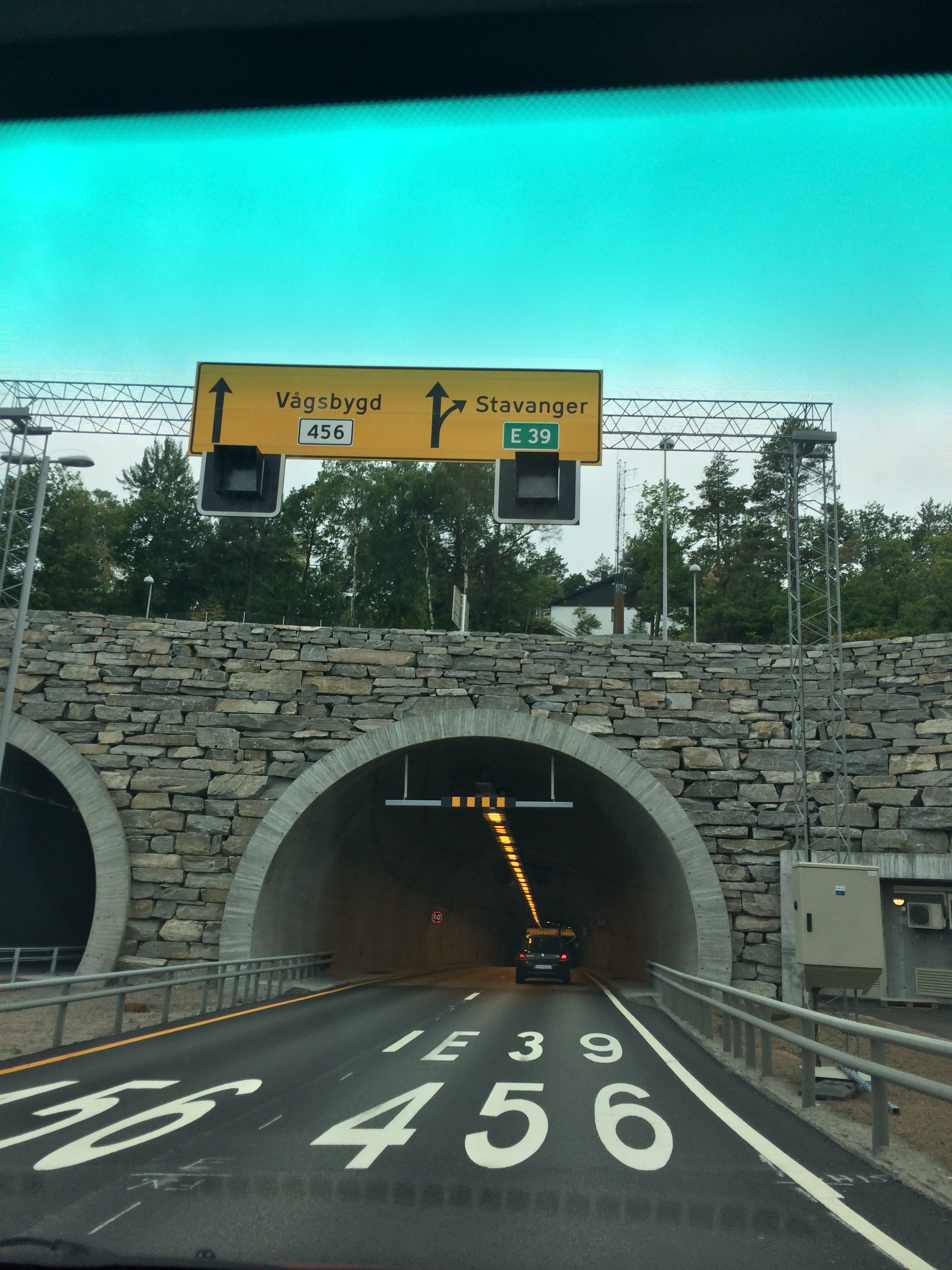
Where E39 meets Fv456

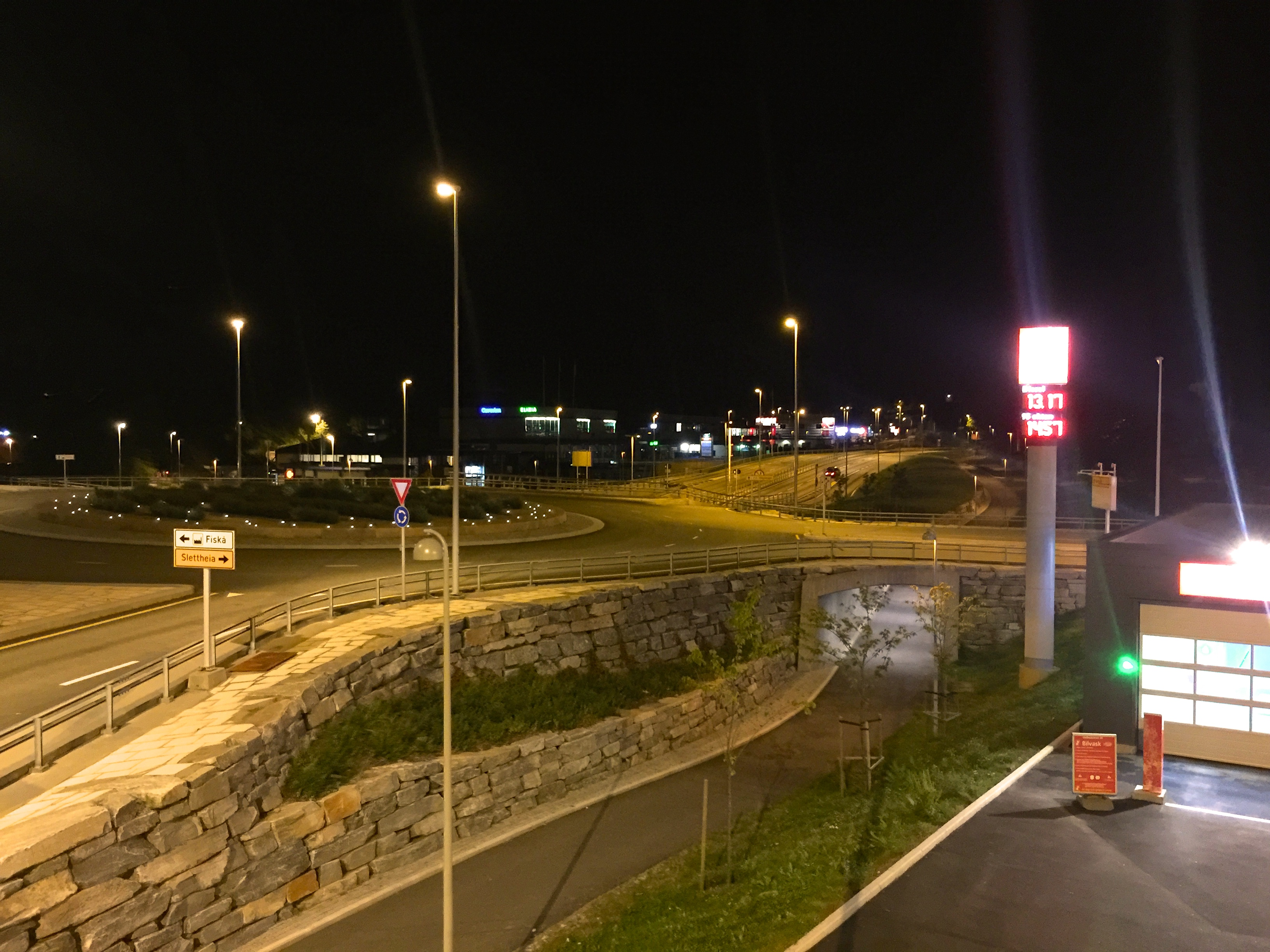
Trekantkrysset, the start of the road in Vågsbygd

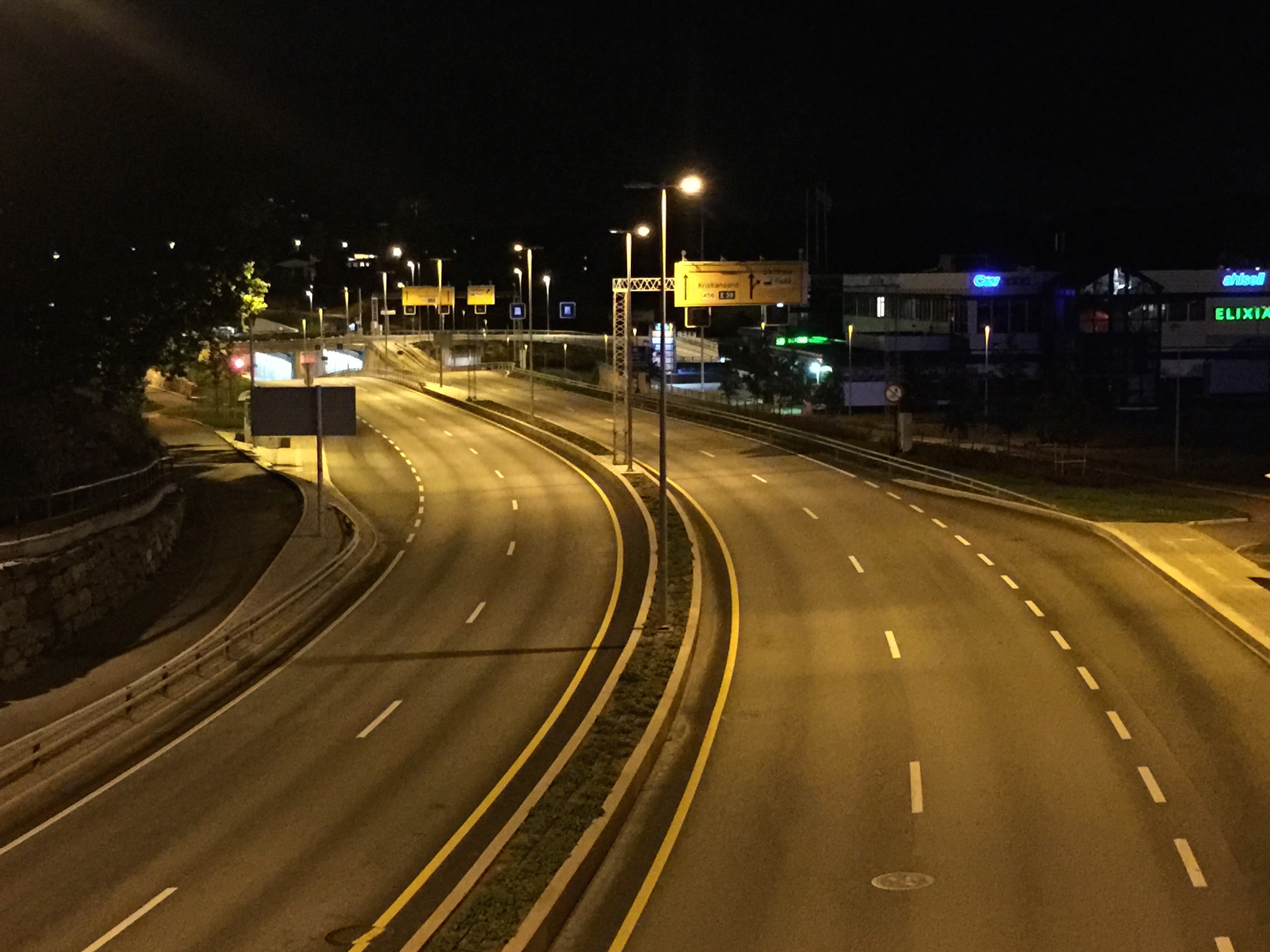
Vågsbygdveien with Lumberkrysset

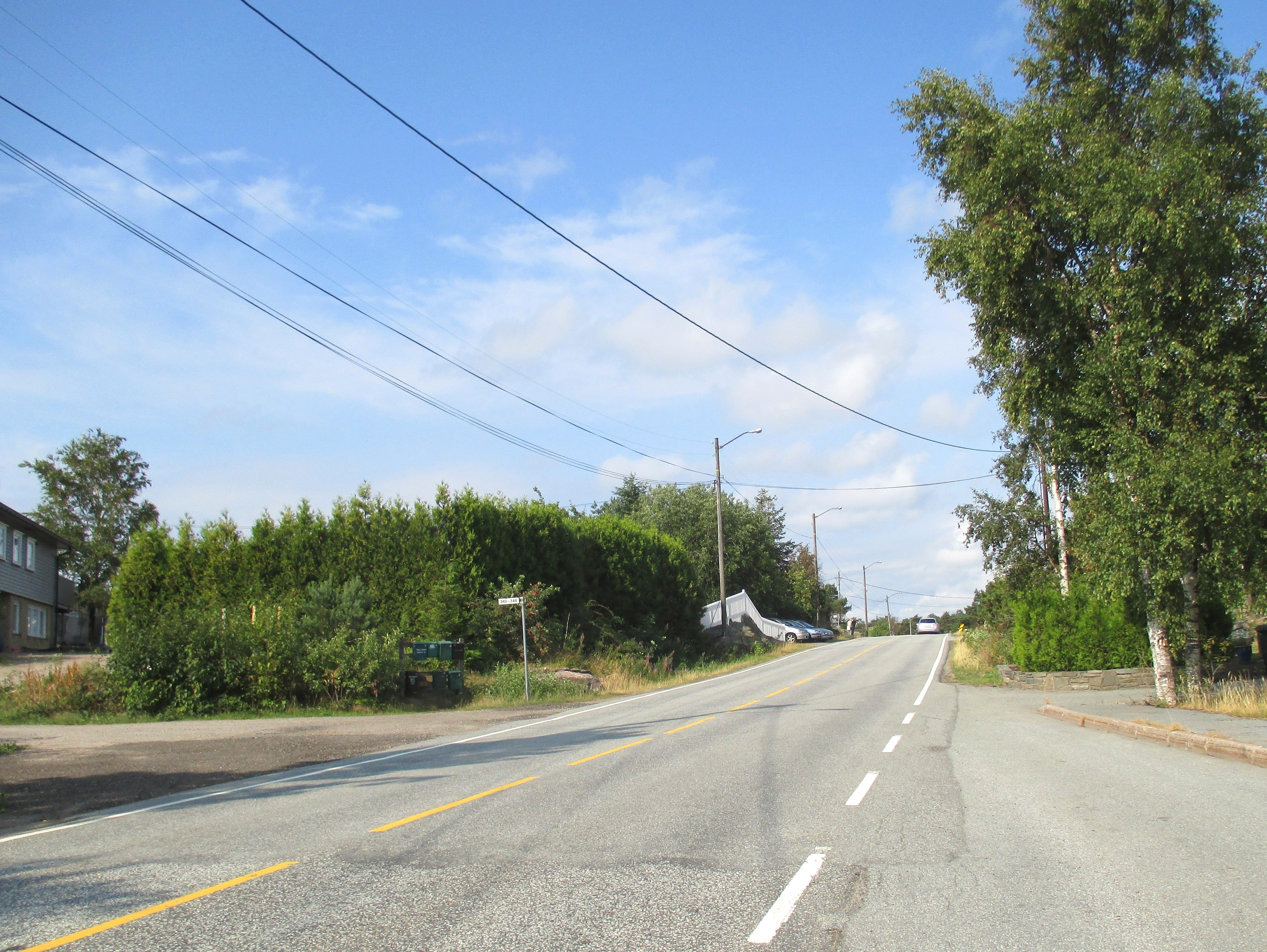
Fv456 in Langenes
