= Andøya, Agder =

Island in Agder, Norway

Andøya
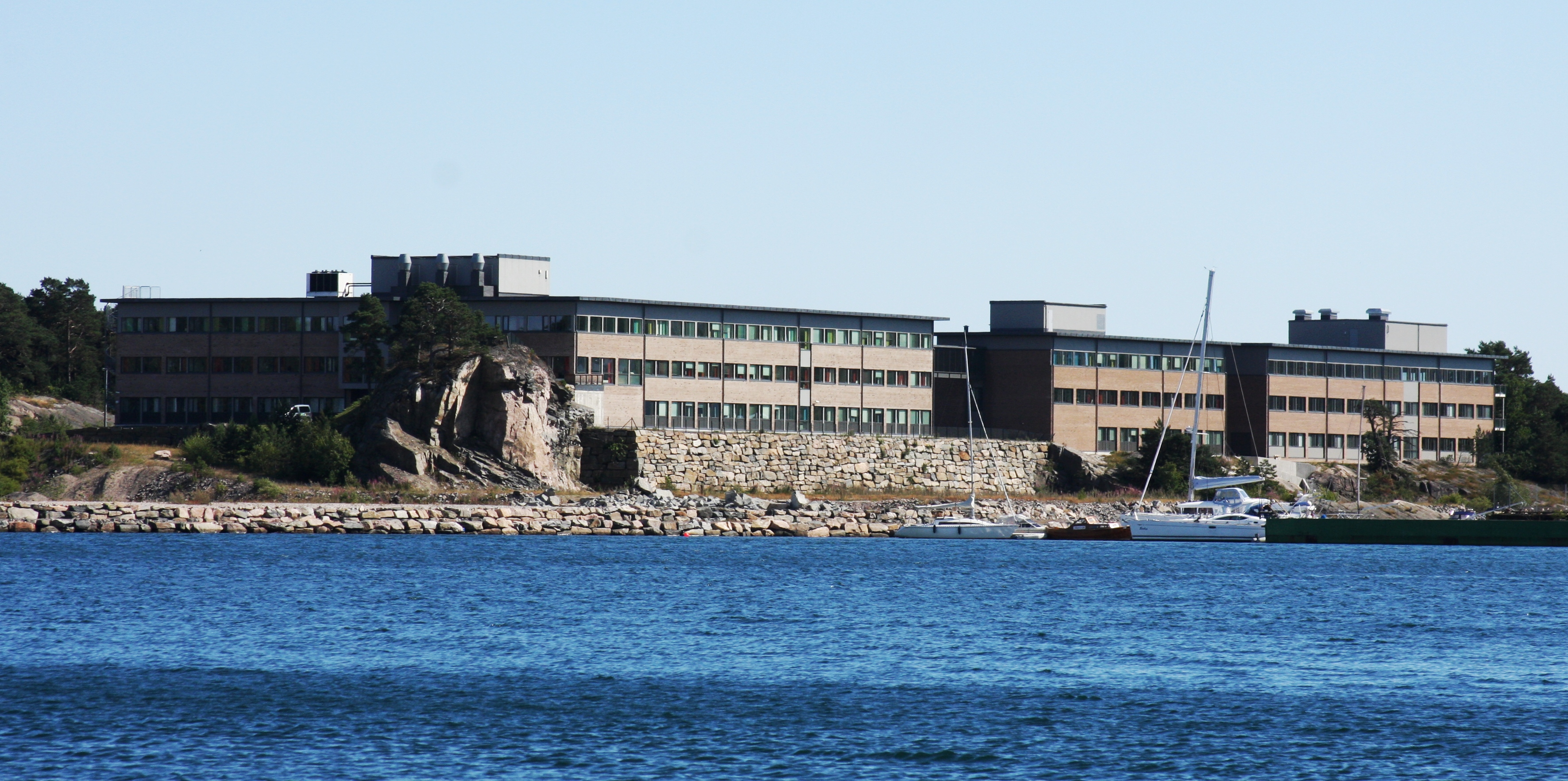
- Interactive map of the island

Geography
- Location: Agder, Norway
- Coordinates: 58.11247°N 7.97889°E
- Area: 0.61 km^{2} (0.24 sq mi)
- Length: 1.5 km (0.93 mi)
- Width: 500 m (1600 ft)
- Coastline: 5 km (3.1 mi)

Administration
- Norway
- County: Agder
- Municipality: Kristiansand Municipality

Demographics
- Population: 1000 (2014)

Andøya is an island in the city of Kristiansand which is located in Kristiansand Municipality in Agder county, Norway. The island (and its residential neighborhood) is part of the district of Voie in the borough of Vågsbygd within the city. The island is connected to the mainland via a short bridge. The island is mostly villas and harbors, and it has a population around 1,000 people (2014).

There are no schools or shops located on the island, but there are a number of businesses and offices located on the island. Buses are available to Vågsbygd a few times a day.

== See also ==
- List of islands of Norway
