= Lauvåsen =

- Neighborhood in Kristiansand
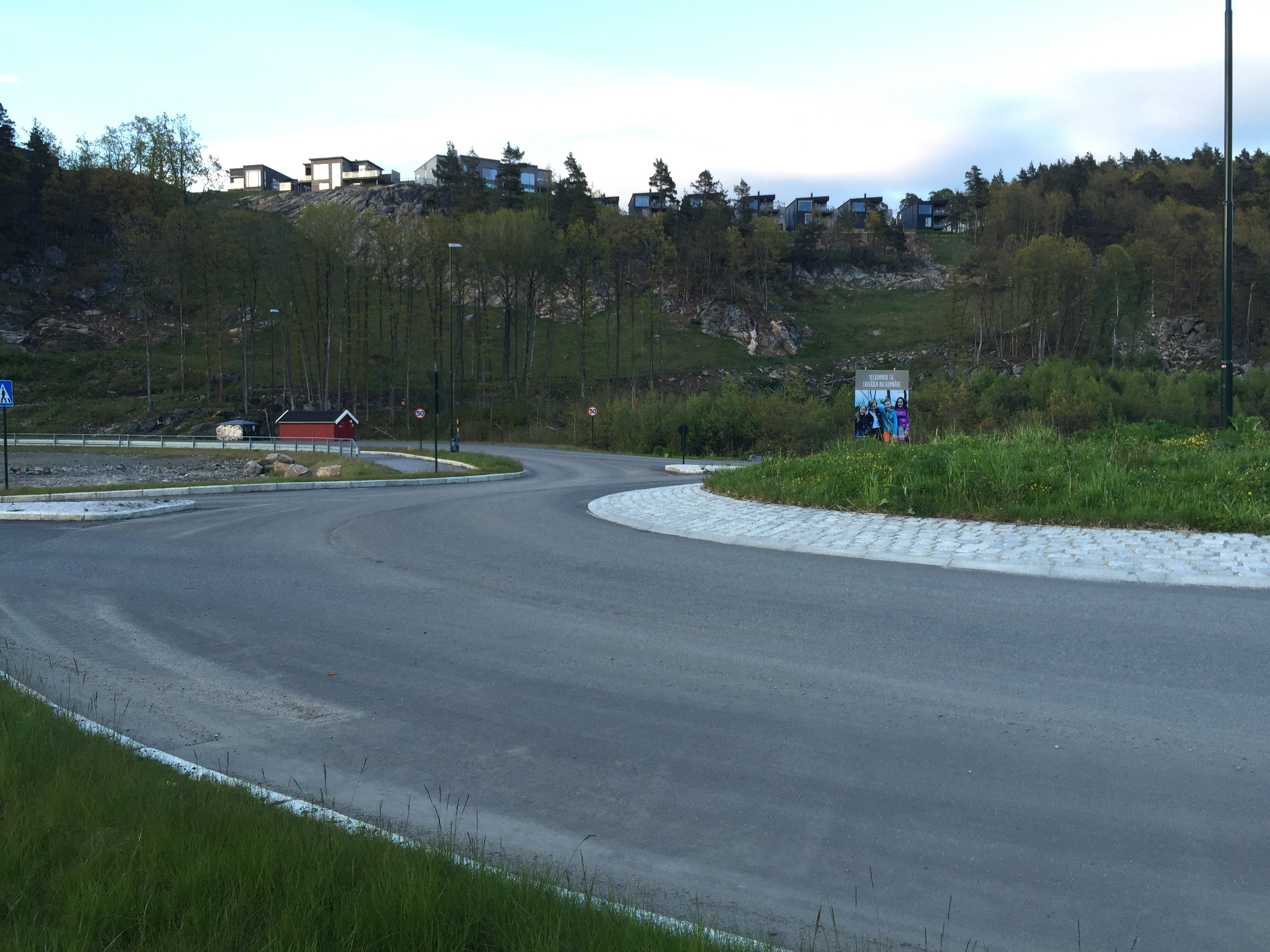
- View of the neighborhood
- Interactive map of Lauvåsen
- Coordinates: 58.1818°N 08.1025°E
- Country: Norway
- County: Agder
- Municipality: Kristiansand
- Borough: Oddernes
- District: Hånes
- Time zone: UTC+01:00 (CET)
  - Summer (DST): UTC+02:00 (CEST)
- Postal code: 4619
- Area code: 38

Lauvåsen is a neighbourhood in the city of Kristiansand in Agder county, Norway. It is a part of the borough of Oddernes and it is in the district of Hånes. The neighbourhood lies between European route E18 and Norwegian National Road 41, just east of the neighborhood of Hånni and southeast of the neighborhood of Grovikheia.

== History ==
It is a new neighbourhood and the first building plots were released in 2011. The first phase of building comprising 127 dwellings was built by the end of 2012. The development is planned to take place over a 15-year period and to total approximately 1200 dwellings.

== Facilities and transport ==
The closest schools are at Hånes and the area is served by bus route M2 "Voiebyen - Hånes" which goes to Lauvåsen once an hour and continues to Sørlandsparken.
