= Voiebyen =

District Voiebyen
- District in Kristiansand
- Coat of arms

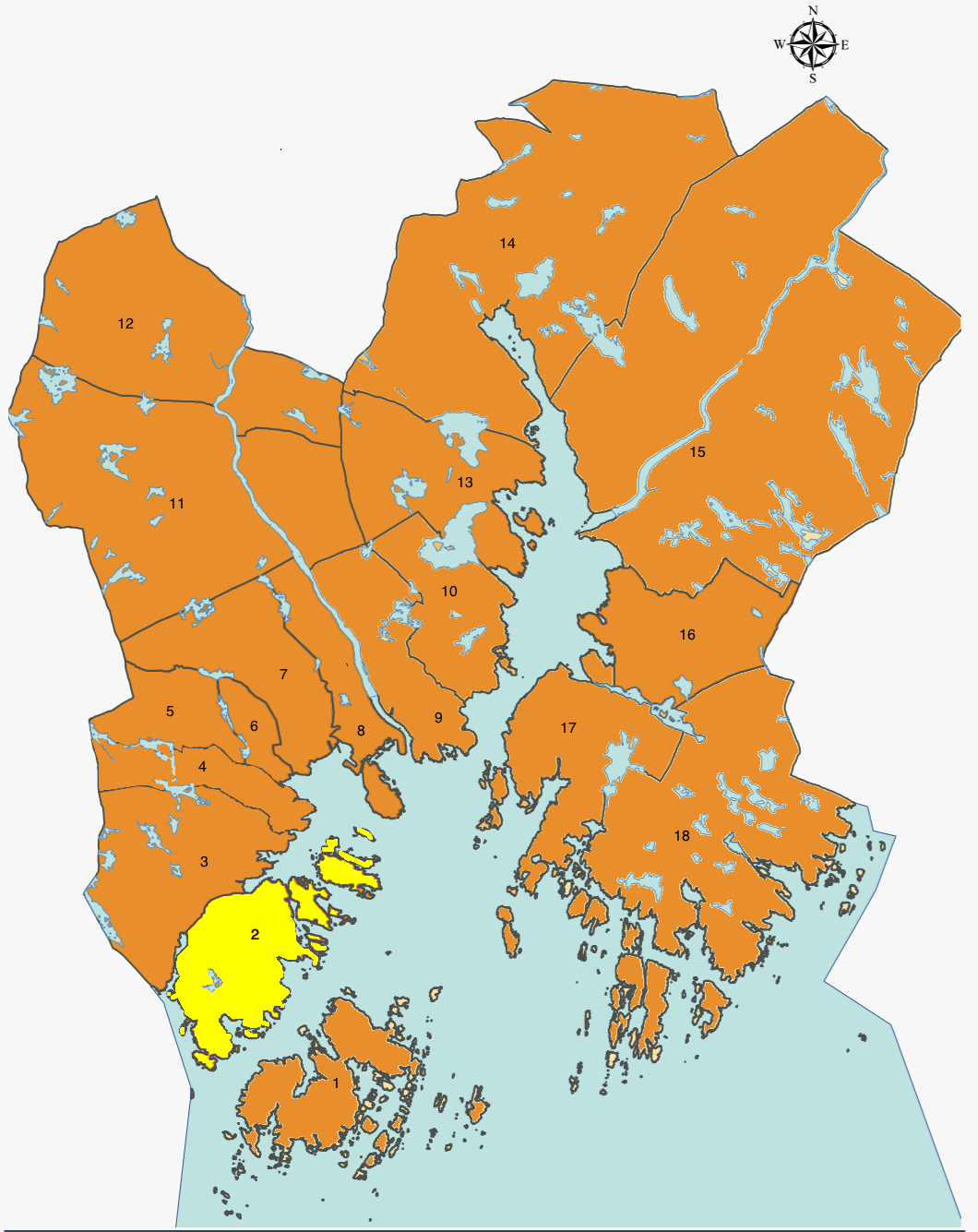
- Interactive map of District Voiebyen
- Coordinates: 58.1058°N 07.9557°E
- Country: Norway
- Region: Southern Norway
- County: Agder
- Municipality: Kristiansand
- Borough: Vågsbygd
- Elevation: 33 m (108 ft)

Population (2014)
  - Total: 6,000
- Time zone: UTC+01:00 (CET)
  - Summer (DST): UTC+02:00 (CEST)
- ISO 3166 code: NO-030112
- Website: kristiansand.kommune.no

Voiebyen is a district in the city of Kristiansand in Agder county, Norway. The district has a population of about 6,000 people in 2014 and it is a part of the borough of Vågsbygd in the southwestern part of the city. The district of Vågsbygd lies to the north, and the district of Flekkerøy lies to the south on the island of Flekkerøya.

Voie Church is located in the district. Voiebyen has one junior high school, Møvik Skole and two elementary schools: Torkelsmyra skole and Voie skole.

== Politics ==
The 10 largest political parties in Voiebyen in 2015:

Kristiansand city council votes from Voiebyen 2015
Labour	27.5% (654 votes)
Conservative	27% (642 votes)
Christian Democratic	15.5% (368 votes)
Progress	7.7% (183 votes)
Norway Democrats	5.6% (134 votes)
Green	3.5% (84 votes)
Socialist Left	2.3% (55 votes)
Pensioners' Party	2% (48 votes)
Red	1.8% (42 votes)
Centre	0.8% (31 votes)
Others	1.8% (44 votes)
Total	2383 votes

== Transportation ==
Local city buses are available from 5:00 am until 1:00 am. Bus line M2 follows the Voie ringvei road and ends in the district of Hånes 3-5 times during the day. Lines 05 and 02 go only a few times in the morning and afternoon. Line 50 follows County road 456 out of Voiebyen to Søgne.

Bus transportation from/through Voiebyen
Line	Destination
M1	Flekkerøy - Sørlandsparken Dyreparken-IKEA
M1	Flekkerøy - Kvadraturen
M2	Voiebyen - Hånes
M2	Voiebyen - Hånes-Lauvåsen
D2	Voiebyen - Kvadraturen
D2	Voiebyen - Kvadraturen-UiA
N2	Flekkerøy - Voiebyen - Kvadraturen
05	Andøya - Vågsbygd kirke
05	Andøya - Kvadraturen
05	Andøya - Kvadraturen-UiA
09	Bråvann - Vågsbygd kirke
09	Bråvann - Kvadraturen
09	Bråvann - Kvadraturen-UiA
50	Søgne - Kristiansand
50	Søgne - Kristiansand-UiA

=== Roads ===
County Road 456 goes through Voiebyen before exiting Kristiansand municipality on its way to Søgne. It is the old main road out of Kristiansand westbound. County Road 457 starts where 456 takes a turn for the west. 457 ends at Flekkerøy after going through a 2,000 meters (6,600 feet) long tunnel. The Voie ringvei road follows a path around Voiebyen.

== Neighbourhoods ==
- Andøya
- Bråvann
- Flekkerøyhavn
- Møvik
- Skutevika
- Steindalen
- Ternevig
- Voie
- Voiebyen nordvest
- Voiebyen nordøst
- Voiebyen sørvest
- Voiebyen sørøst

== Media gallery ==
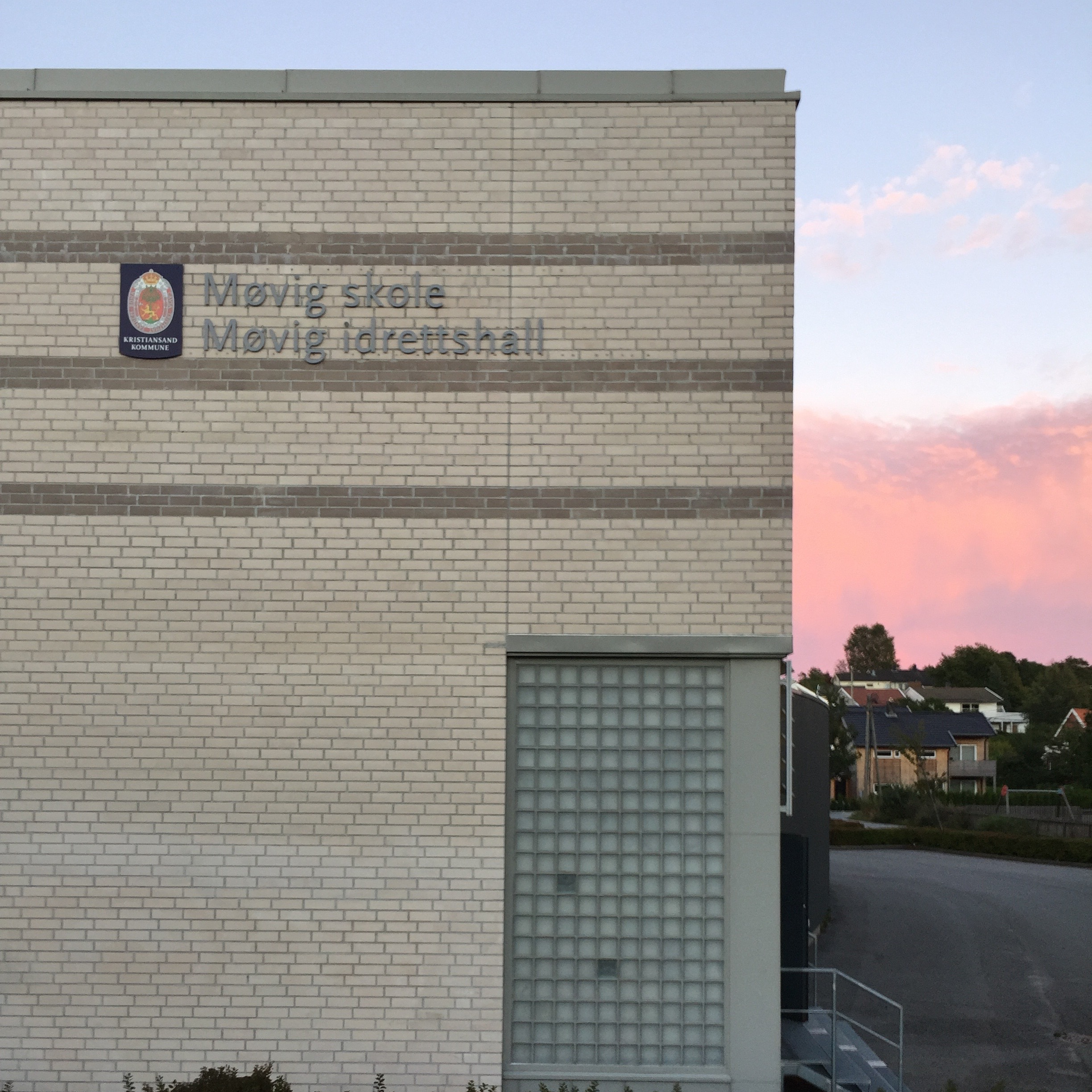
Møvig Junior High

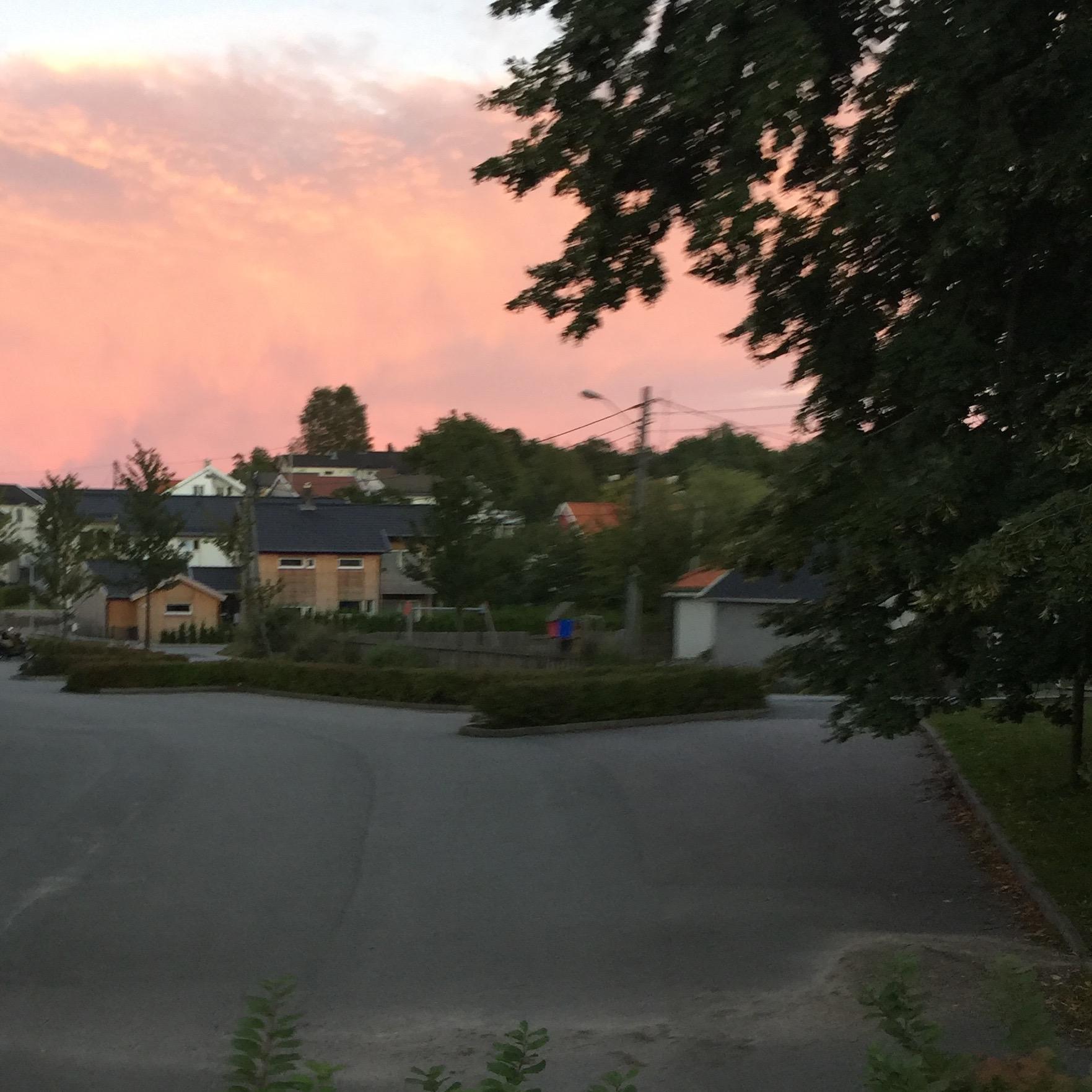
Møvik

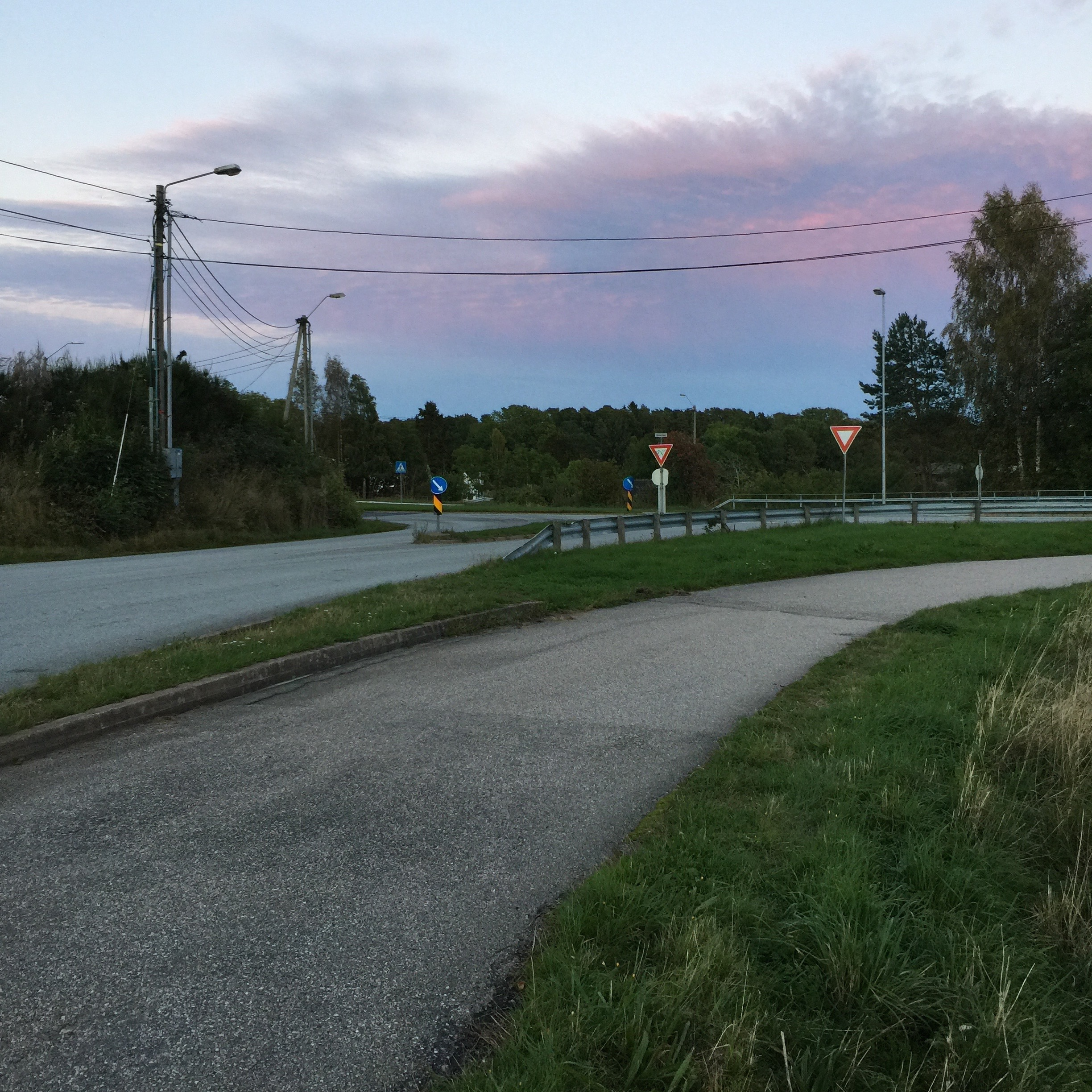
Flekkerøyhavn

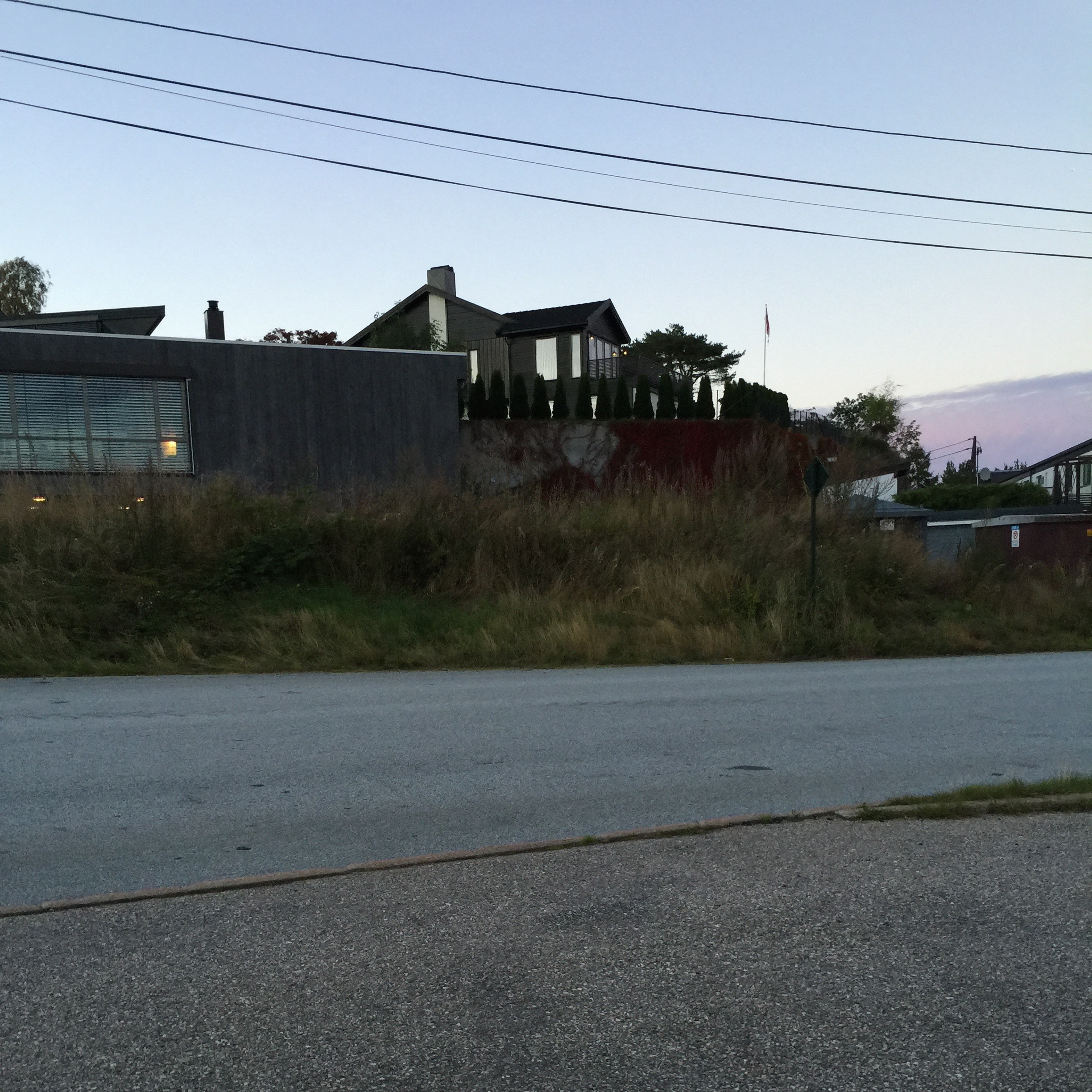
Skonnertveien

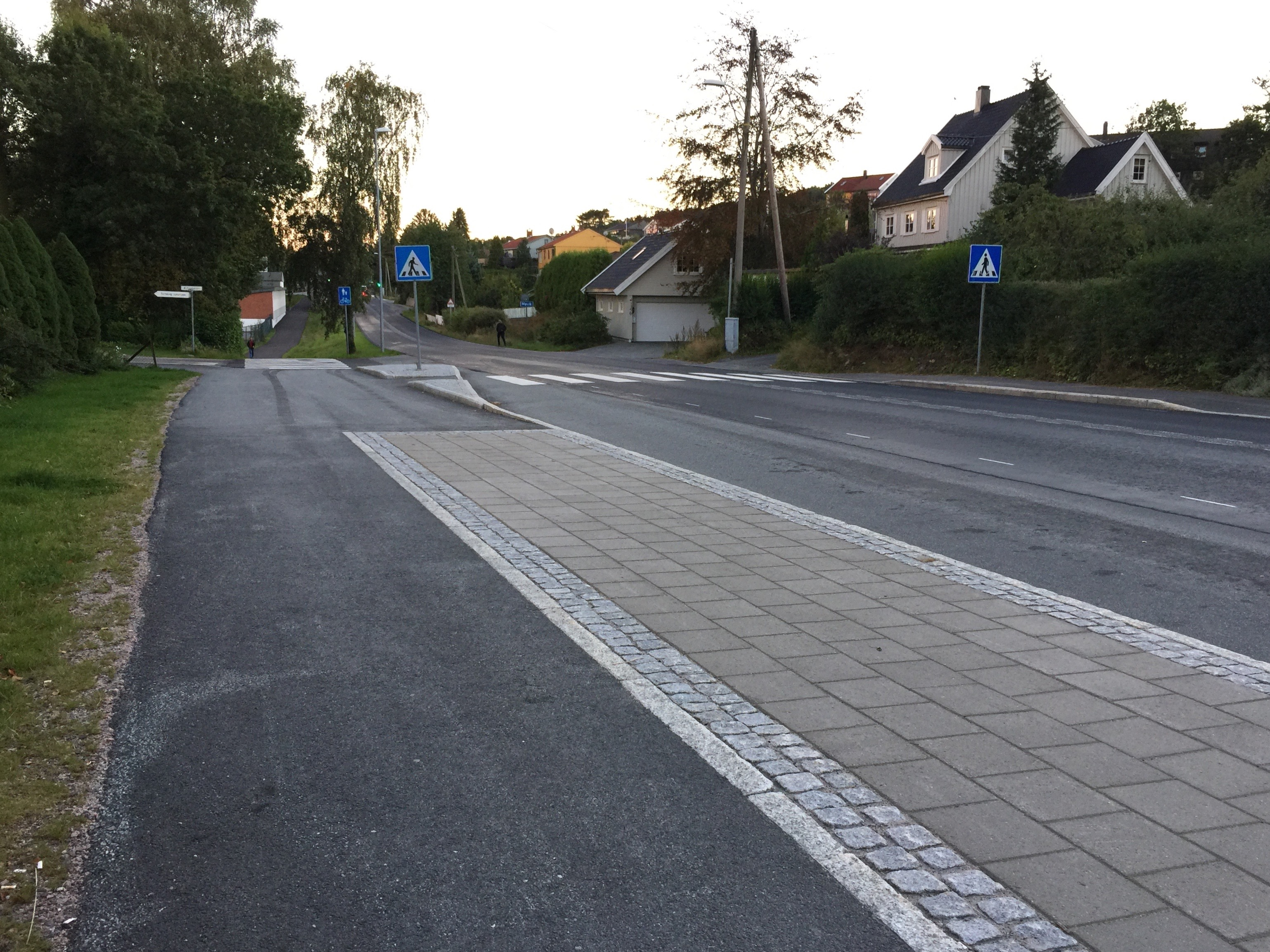
Ternevig
