= Hånes =

District Hånes
- District of Kristiansand
- Coat of arms

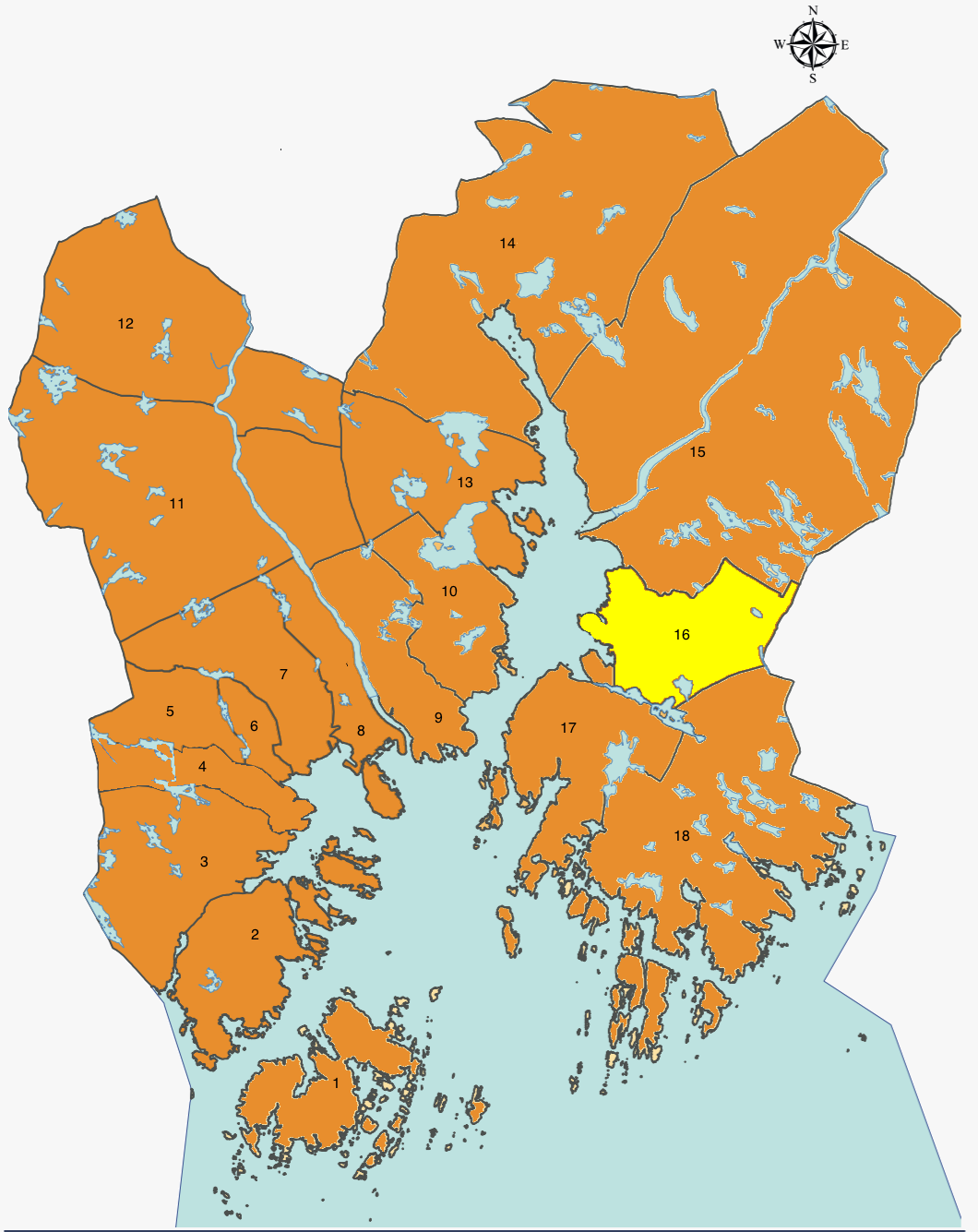
- Interactive map of District Hånes
- Coordinates: 58.1772°N 08.0904°E
- Country: Norway
- Region: Southern Norway
- County: Agder
- Municipality: Kristiansand
- Borough: Oddernes
- Elevation: 39 m (128 ft)

Population (2014)
  - Total: 4,000
- Time zone: UTC+01:00 (CET)
  - Summer (DST): UTC+02:00 (CEST)
- ISO 3166 code: NO-030112
- Website: kristiansand.kommune.no

Hånes is a district in the city of Kristiansand in Agder county, Norway. It has a population of about 4,000 (2014). Hånes is a part of the borough of Oddernes and it borders the districts of Søm and Randesund to south, the district of Tveit to north, Lillesand Municipality to east, and the Topdalsfjorden to west. Hånes Church is located in this district.

== Neighbourhoods ==
- Berhus
- Brattbakken
- Grovikheia
- Hånes
- Hånes nordvest
- Hånes nordøst
- Hånestangen
- Vigevollåsen

== Transportation ==
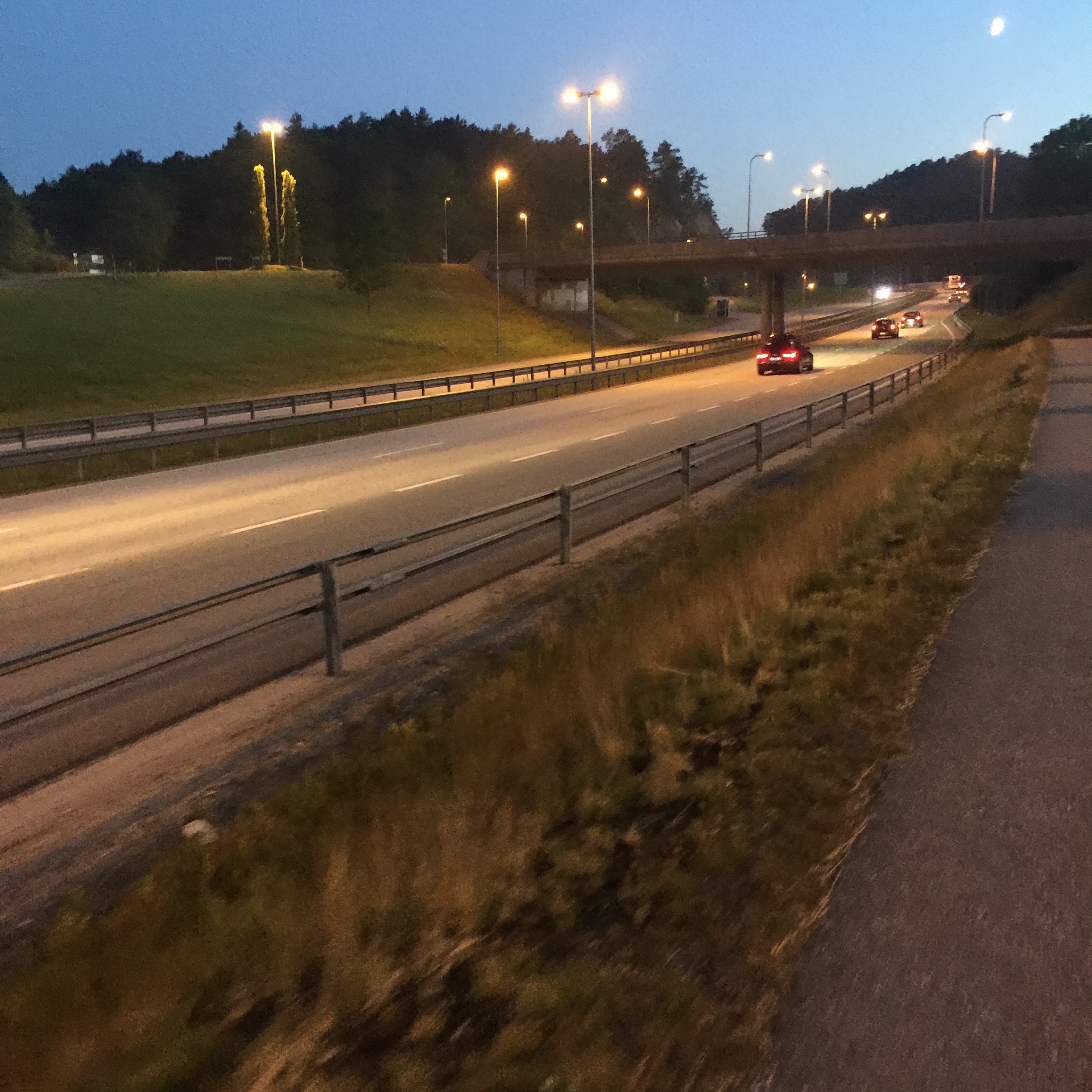
E18 highway at Håneskrysset

European route E18 goes south for Hånes while Norwegian National Road 41 goes east for Hånes.

Bus transportation from/through Hånes
Line	Destination
M2	Hånes - Voiebyen
M2	Hånes - Lauvåsen - Sørlandsparken
A2	Hånes - Kvadraturen
N2	Hånes - Kvadraturen
35	Kjevik-Brattvollshei - Kristiansand
35	Kjevik-Brattvollshei o/ Grødum - Kristiansand
36	Tveit-Grødum - Kristiansand
36	Tveit-Grødum o/ Kjevik - Rona
37	Birkeland - Kristiansand
FLY	Kristiansand Airport, Kjevik - Kristiansand

== Politics ==
The 10 largest political parties in Hånes in 2015:

Kristiansand city council votes from Hånes 2015
Labour Party	34,7% (554 votes)
Conservative Party	18,3% (292 votes)
Christian Democratic Party	14,9% (238 votes)
Progress Party	10,7% (170 votes)
Socialist Left Party	4,1% (65 votes)
Green Party	3,5% (56 votes)
Socialist Left Party	2,9% (46 votes)
Pensioners' Party	2% (32 votes)
The Christians	1,8% (29 votes)
Red	1,2% (19 votes)
Others	1,28% (29 votes)
Total	1531 votes

== Photos ==
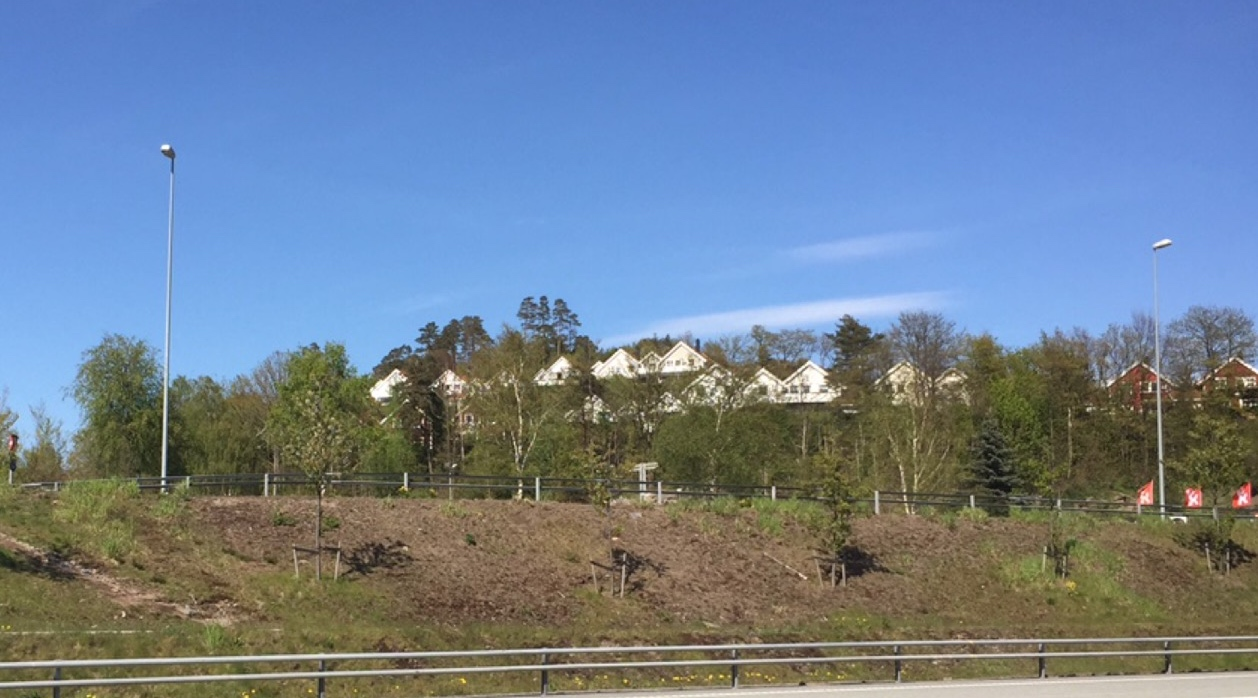
Vigvollåsen

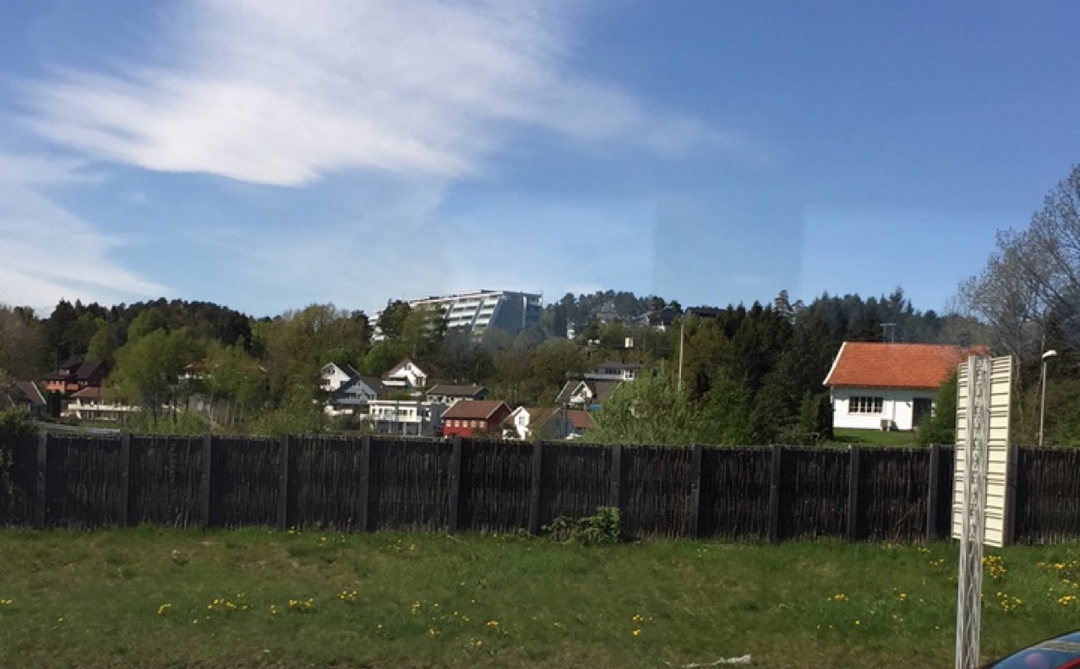
Vigvoll

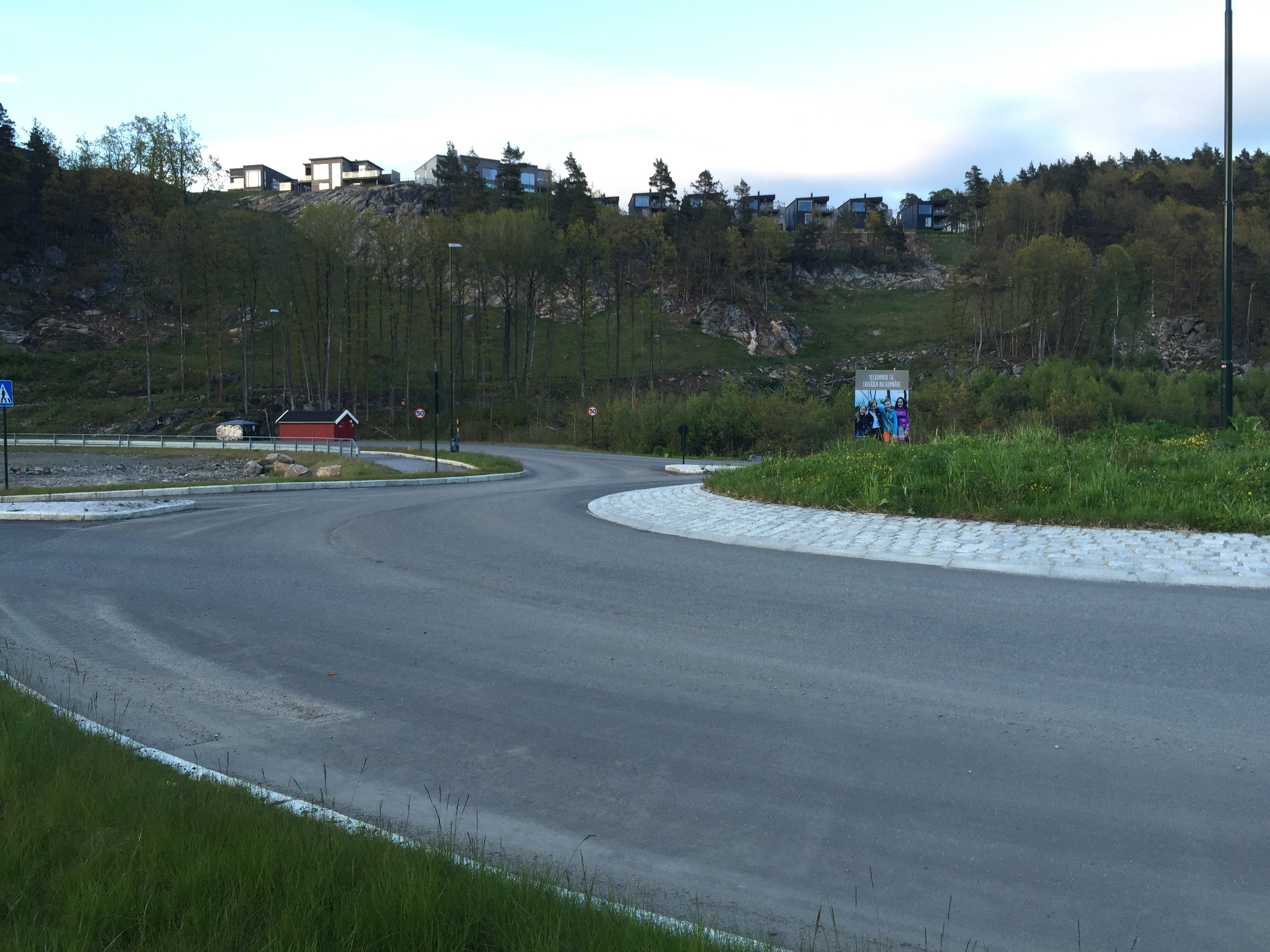
Lauvåsen

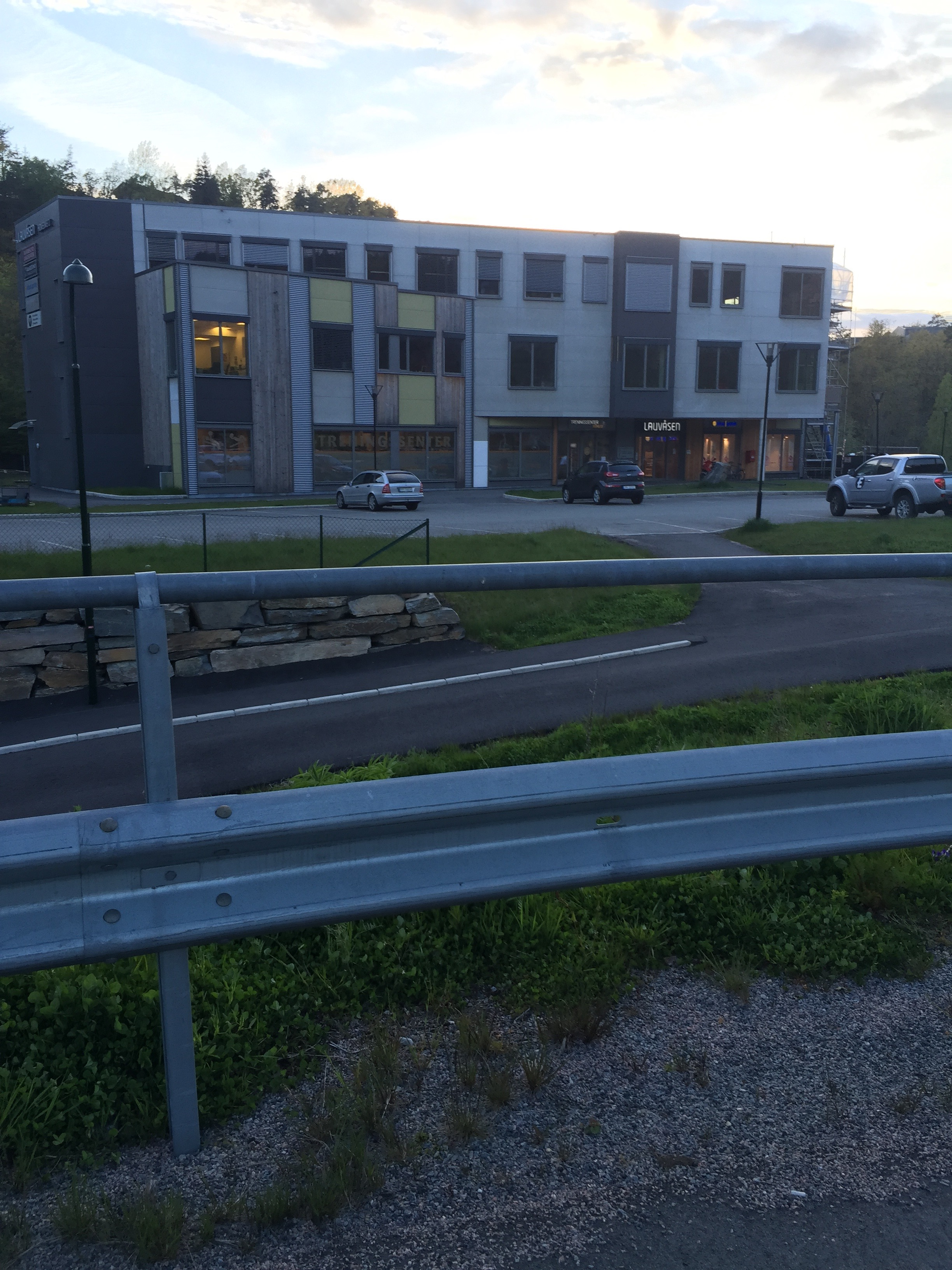
Lauvåsen senter
