= Sørlandsparken =

Building complex in Kristiansand, Norway

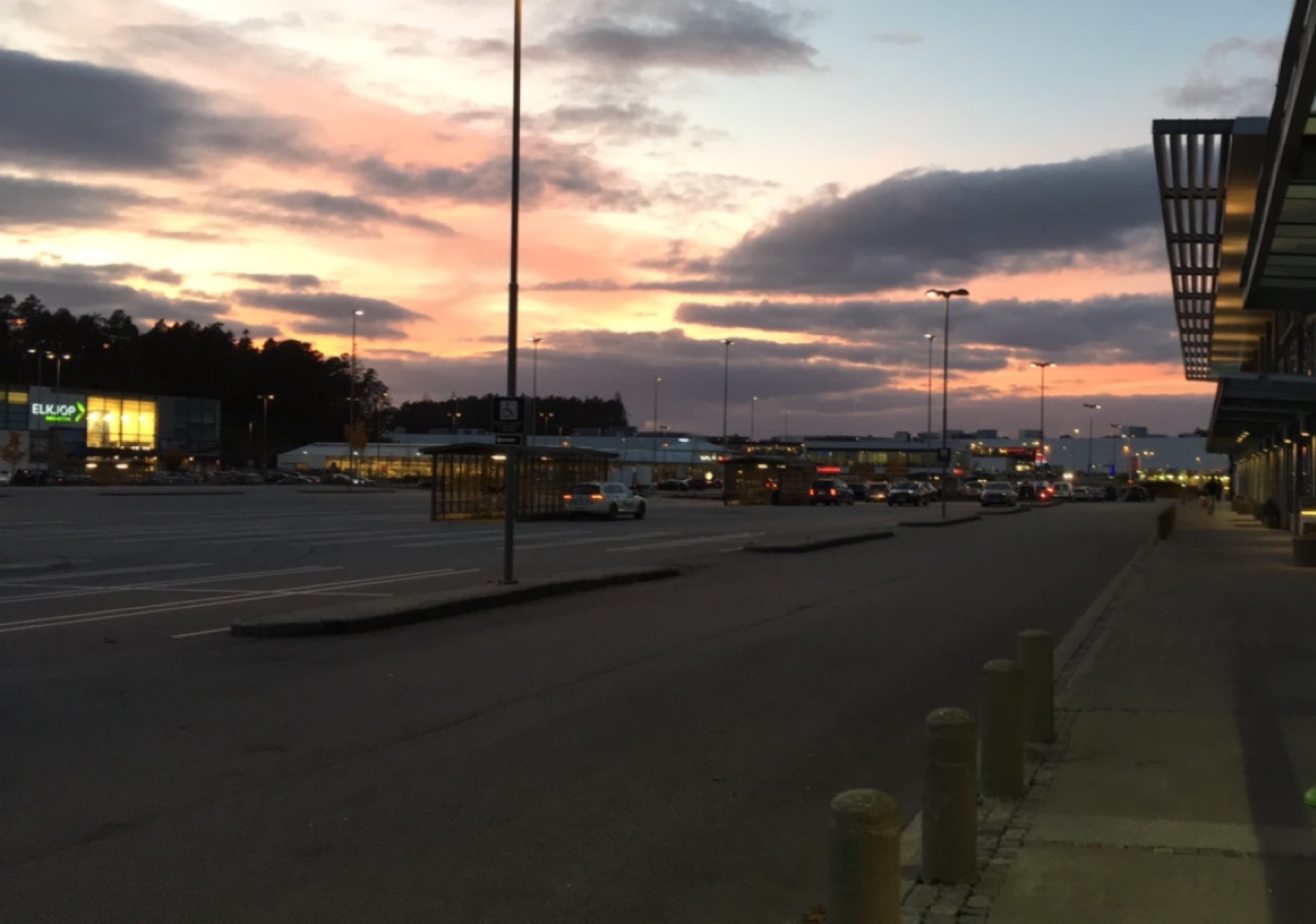
Avenyen of Sørlandsparken

Sørlandsparken is a power center in Kristiansand Municipality in Agder county, Norway. The business park covers an area of about 670,000 square metres (170 acres) and it has over 5,000 work positions. The park area is located just off the European route E18 highway in the district of Tveit and it includes Norway's largest shopping mall, Sørlandssenteret as well as the Kristiansand Zoo and Amusement Park.

== Facilities ==
=== Sørlandssentert ===
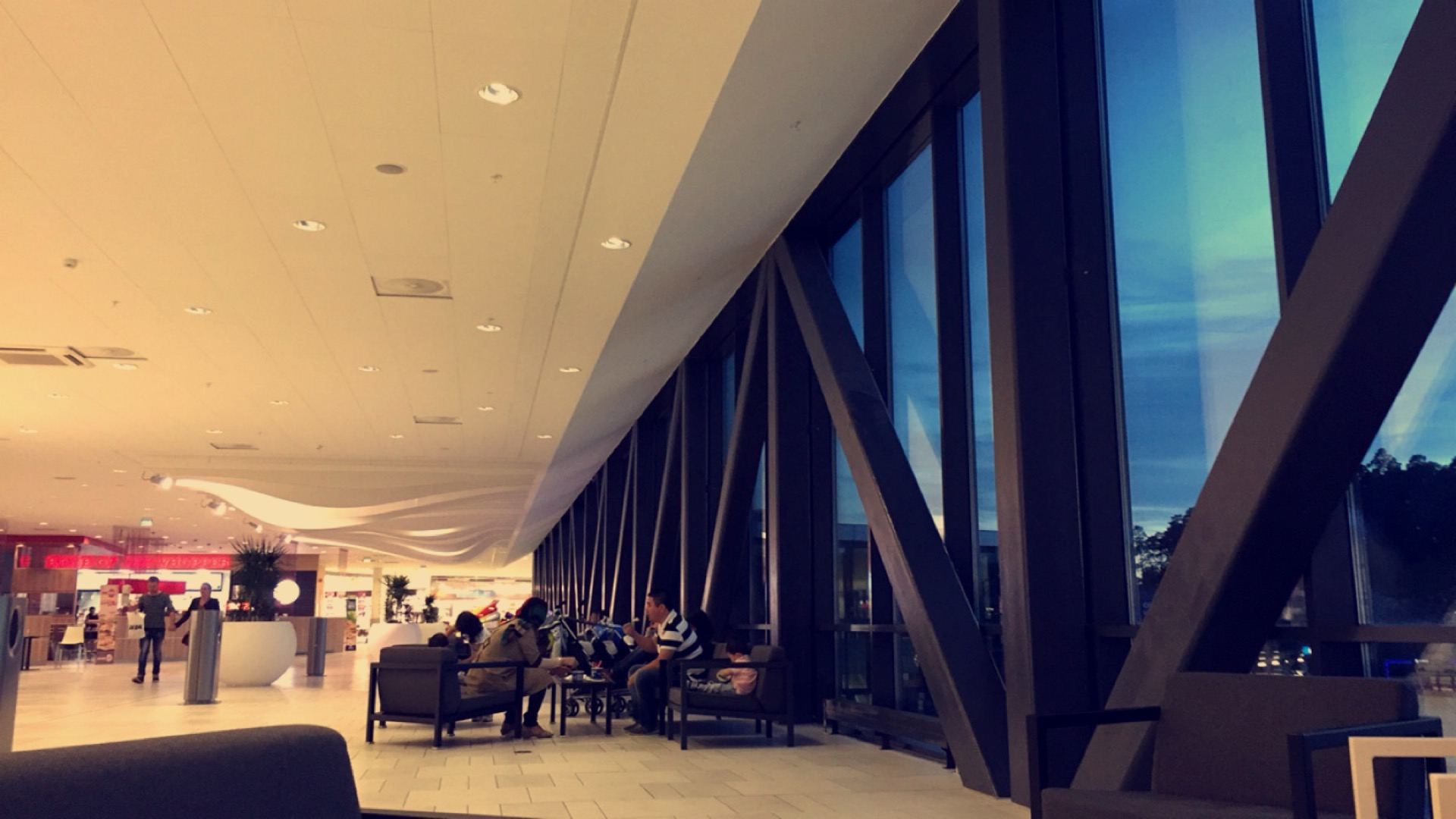
Inside of Sørlandssenteret

Sørlandssenteret is the largest mall in Norway at over 110,000 square metres (1,200,000 sq ft). It has over 165 stores.

=== Kristiansand Zoo and Amusement Park ===
Kristiansand Zoo and Amusement Park is Norway's largest zoo, it's also an amusement park and waterpark during the summer season.

=== Speedway ===
Motorcycle speedway is held at the Sørlandsparken Speedwaybane adjacent to the motocross track. It was built on the Skibåsen by the speedway club NMK Kristiansand. The venue has held the Norwegian Individual Speedway Championship in 2012, 2016, and 2024.

== Transportation ==
There are local city buses goes from Kvadraturen and Flekkerøy through the park, to the zoo, and then to IKEA four times each hour. The European route E18 highway passes by Sørlandsparken.
