= List of boroughs of Kristiansand =

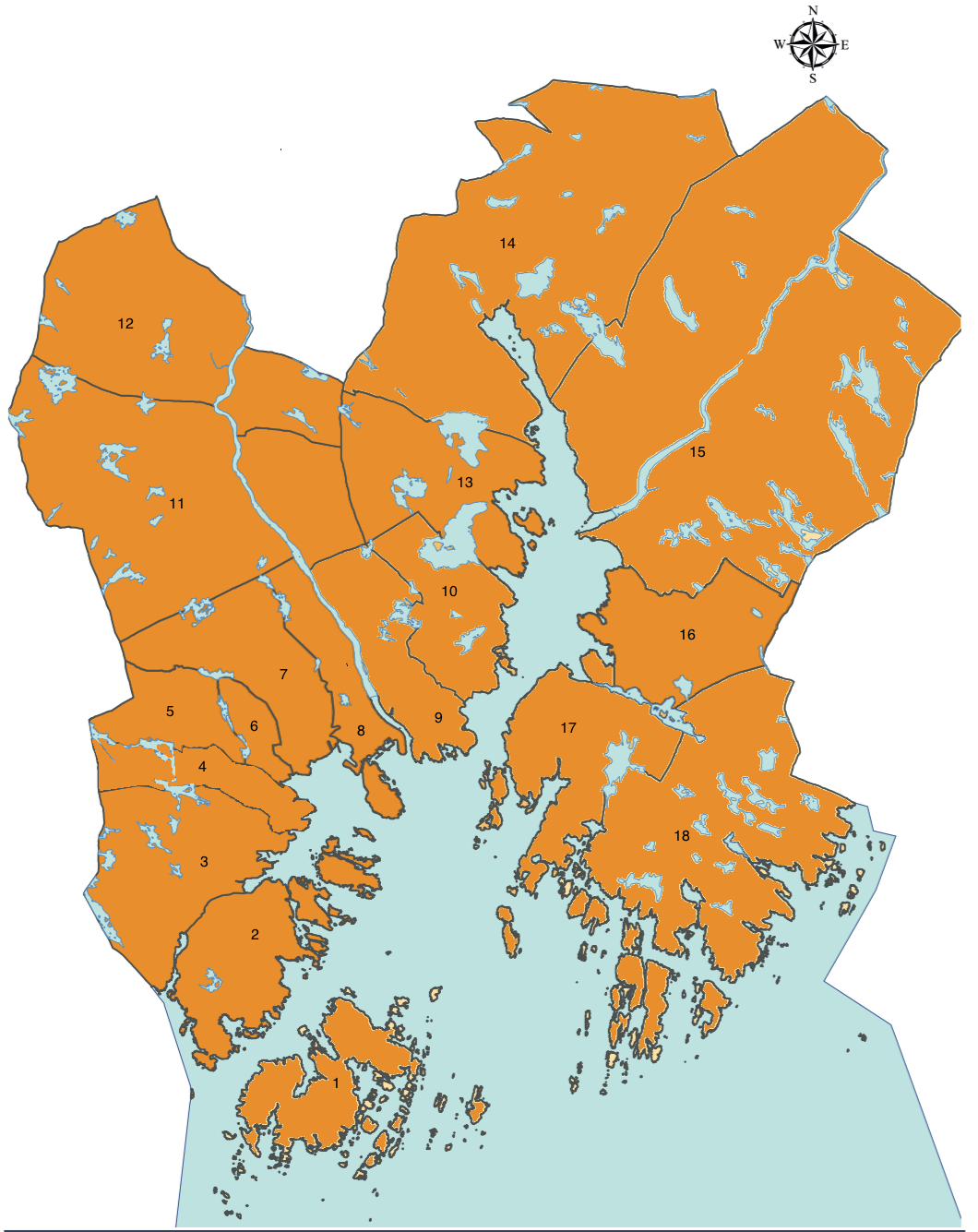
Map of boroughs in Kristiansand, Norway, in 2015

This is a list of districts of Kristiansand Municipality which is located in Agder county, Norway. The municipality is divided into 7 districts (or boroughs) and each district is further divided into several sub-districts. In total, there are 24 sub-districts.

List of districts and population
No.	District	Population	Map	Photo
1	Vågsbygd	36,210 (2015)		
2	Grim	16,000 (2015)		
3	Kvadraturen (Centrum)	6,750 (2015)		
4	Lund	30,000 (2015)		
5	Oddernes	19,800 (2015)		
6	Søgne	11,321 (2020)		
7	Songdalen	6,568 (2020)		

Sub-Districts
Number (map)	District	Sub-District	SSB Code
1	Vågsbygd	Flekkerøy	42040100
2	Vågsbygd	Voie-Møvig	42040200
3	Vågsbygd	Midtre Vågsbygd	42040300
4	Vågsbygd	Slettheia	42040400
5	Grim	Hellemyr-Fjellro	42040500
6	Grim	Tinnheia	42040600
7	Grim	Grim-Møllevann-Dalane	42040700
11	Grim	Stray	42041200
12	Grim	Mosby	42041300
8	Kvadraturen	Kvadraturen-Eg	42040800
9	Lund	Lund-Sødal	42040900
10	Lund	Kongsgård øvre-Gimlekollen	42041100
13	Lund	Justvik	42041400
14	Lund	Ålefjær	42041500
15	Oddernes	Tveit	42041600
16	Oddernes	Hånes-Timenes	42041700
17	Oddernes	Søm-Torsvikheia	42041800
18	Oddernes	Ytre Randesund	42041900
19	Søgne	Søgne Østre	42042000
20	Søgne	Søgne Vestre	42042100
21	Songdalen	Finsland	42042200
22	Songdalen	Stokkeland	42042300
23	Songdalen	Nodeland	42042400
24	Songdalen	Brennåsen	42042500
