= Nedre Slettheia =

- Neighborhood in Kristiansand
- Interactive map of Nedre Slettheia
- Coordinates: 58.1335°N 07.9451°E
- Country: Norway
- County: Agder
- Municipality: Kristiansand
- Borough: Vågsbygd
- District: Slettheia
- Time zone: UTC+01:00 (CET)
  - Summer (DST): UTC+02:00 (CEST)
- Postal code: 4626
- Area code: 38

Nedre Slettheia is a neighbourhood in the city of Kristiansand in Agder county, Norway. It is located in the borough of Vågsbygd and in the district of Slettheia. Nedre Slettheia is south of Rugde, northeast of Gislemyr, west of Blørstad, and east of Øvre Slettheia.

== Transportation ==
Bus lines through Nedre Slettheia
Line	Destinations
M3	Slettheia - Søm
D3	Slettheia - Søm
