= Karuss =

- Neighborhood in Kristiansand
- Interactive map of Karuss
- Coordinates: 58.1287°N 07.9479°E
- Country: Norway
- County: Agder
- Municipality: Kristiansand
- Borough: Vågsbygd
- District: Slettheia
- Elevation: 39 m (128 ft)
- Time zone: UTC+01:00 (CET)
  - Summer (DST): UTC+02:00 (CEST)
- Postal code: 4620
- Area code: 38

Karuss is a neighbourhood in the city of Kristiansand in Agder county, Norway. It is located in the borough of Vågsbygd and in the district of Slettheia. Karuss is northwest of Kjerrheia, southwest of Gislemyr, west of Trekanten, and east of Nordtjønnåsen.

== Transportation ==
Bus lines through Bjørklia
Line	Destinations
M3	Vågsbygd sentrum - Slettheia - Søm
D3	Vågsbygd sentrum - Slettheia - Kvadraturen (-UiA)
12	Kjos Haveby - Eg-Sykehuset
