= Kartheia =

- Neighborhood in Kristiansand
- Interactive map of Kartheia
- Coordinates: 58.13784°N 7.9531°E
- Country: Norway
- County: Agder
- Municipality: Kristiansand
- Borough: Vågsbygd
- District: Slettheia
- Elevation: 23 m (75 ft)
- Time zone: UTC+01:00 (CET)
  - Summer (DST): UTC+02:00 (CEST)
- Postal code: 4623
- Area code: 38

Kartheia is a neighbourhood in the city of Kristiansand in Agder county, Norway. It is located in the northern part of the borough of Vågsbygd and in the district of Slettheia. The neighborhood lies southwest of the junction of the European route E39 highway and the County Road 456. The district of Hellemyr lies to the north. Kartheia contains residential areas as well as a large industrial area. Gislemyr lies to the south, Trane lies to the west, and Hannevika lies to the east.

Only local bus lines from Kartheia
| Line | Destination |
|---|---|
| 17 | Hellemyr - Tømmerstø |
| 17 | Hellemyr - Tømmerstø-Frikstad |
| 17 | Hellemyr - Kvadraturen |
| 18 | Hellemyr - Tømmerstø-Odderhei Holte |
