= Blørstad =

- Neighborhood in Kristiansand
- Interactive map of Blørstad
- Coordinates: 58.1303°N 07.9617°E
- Country: Norway
- County: Agder
- Municipality: Kristiansand
- Borough: Vågsbygd
- District: Slettheia
- Elevation: 36 m (118 ft)
- Time zone: UTC+01:00 (CET)
  - Summer (DST): UTC+02:00 (CEST)
- Postal code: 4626
- Area code: 38

Blørstad is a neighbourhood in the city of Kristiansand in Agder county, Norway. It is located in the borough of Vågsbygd and in the district of Slettheia. Blørstad has residential and industrial areas. It lies north and west of Fiskåtangen, southeast of Kartheia, and south of Hannevika.

Bus lines from Blørstad
Line	Destination
12	Kjos Haveby - Eg - Sykehuset
