= Fiskå =

Fiskå may refer to:

- Fiskå, Rogaland, a village in Strand municipality, Rogaland county, Norway
- Fiskåbygd, or simply Fiskå, a village in Vanylven municipality, Møre og Romsdal county, Norway
- Fiskåtangen, or simply Fiskå, a borough in the city of Kristiansand in Agder county, Norway
