= Gislemyr =

- Neighborhood in Kristiansand
- Interactive map of Gislemyr
- Coordinates: 58.1305°N 07.9523°E
- Country: Norway
- County: Agder
- Municipality: Kristiansand
- Borough: Vågsbygd
- District: Slettheia
- Elevation: 33 m (108 ft)
- Time zone: UTC+01:00 (CET)
  - Summer (DST): UTC+02:00 (CEST)
- Postal code: 4626
- Area code: 38

Gislemyr is a neighbourhood in the city of Kristiansand in Agder county, Norway. It is located in the borough of Vågsbygd and in the district of Slettheia. Gislemyr is north of Karuss, and south of Trane, and west of Blørstad and Fiskåtangen.

== Transportation ==
Bus lines through Gislemyr
| Line | Destinations |
|---|---|
| M3 | Slettheia - Søm |
| D3 | Slettheia - Søm |
