= Trane (Kristiansand) =

Trane Rugde
- Neighborhood in Kristiansand
- Interactive map of Trane
- Coordinates: 58°08′09″N 7°56′29″E
- Country: Norway
- County: Agder
- Municipality: Kristiansand
- Borough: Vågsbygd
- District: Slettheia
- Elevation: 127 m (417 ft)
- Time zone: UTC+01:00 (CET)
  - Summer (DST): UTC+02:00 (CEST)
- Postal code: 4626
- Area code: 38

Trane or Rugde is a neighbourhood in the city of Kristiansand in Agder county, Norway. It is located in the northern part of the borough of Vågsbygd and in the district of Slettheia. Trane/Rugde is northwest of Gislemyr, north of Nedre Slettheia, south of Rige, and east of Øvre Slettheia.

== Transportation ==
Bus lines serving Trane
| Line | Destinations |
|---|---|
| M3 | Slettheia - Søm |
| D3 | Slettheia - Søm |
