= Hellemyr Church =

Church in Agder, Norway

- Hellemyr kirke
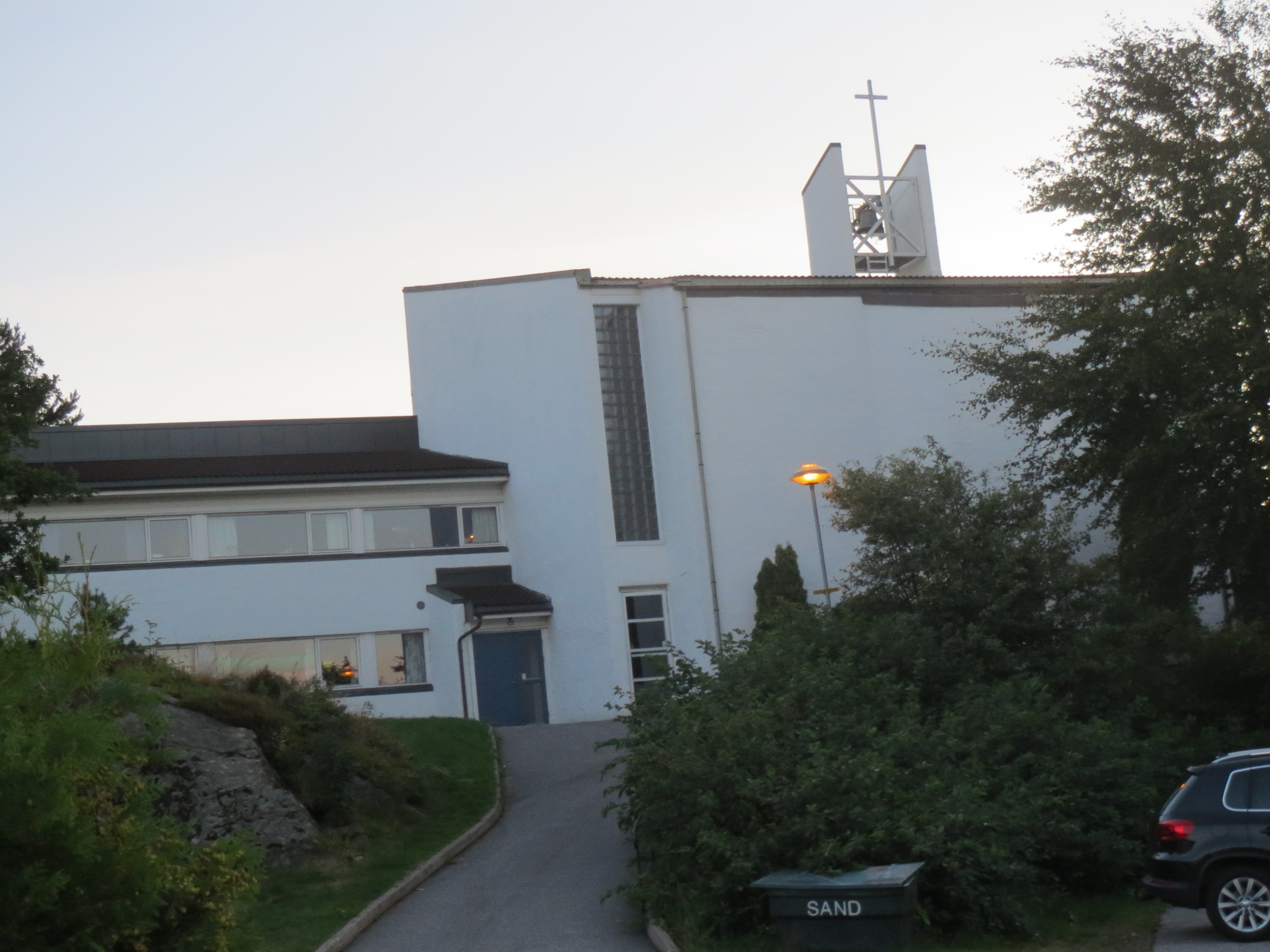
- View of the church
- Hellemyr Church
- 58.14809°N 07.92212°E
- Location: Kristiansand Municipality, Agder
- Country: Norway
- Denomination: Church of Norway
- Churchmanship: Evangelical Lutheran

History
- Former name: Vestheiene kirke
- Status: Parish church
- Founded: 1988
- Consecrated: 1988

Architecture
- Functional status: Active
- Architect: Arild Lauvland
- Architectural type: Rectangular
- Completed: 1988 (38 years ago)

Specifications
- Capacity: 220
- Materials: Concrete

Administration
- Diocese: Agder og Telemark
- Deanery: Kristiansand domprosti
- Parish: Hellemyr

Hellemyr Church (Norwegian: Hellemyr kirke) is a parish church of the Church of Norway in Kristiansand Municipality in Agder county, Norway. It is located in the district of Hellemyr in the borough of Grim in the city of Kristiansand. It is the church for the Hellemyr parish which is part of the Kristiansand domprosti (arch-deanery) in the Diocese of Agder og Telemark. The white church was constructed out of concrete and expanded clay aggregate. It was built in a rectangular design in 1988 using plans drawn up by the architect Arild Lauvland. The church seats about 220 people.

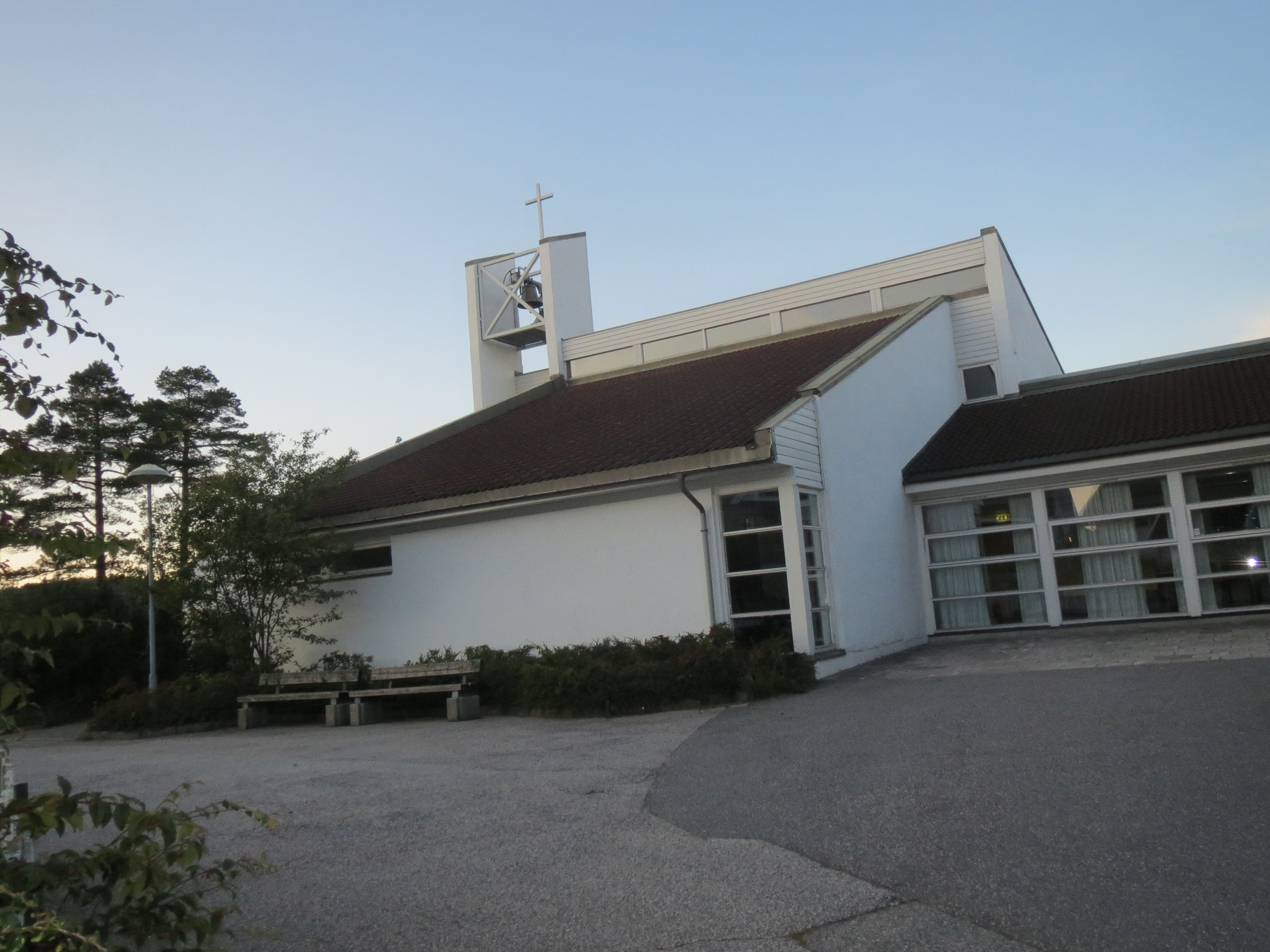
View of the church

The church was founded in 1988 to serve this area of the city. In 2002, the church was expanded to include several offices and other parish rooms.

== See also ==
- List of churches in Agder og Telemark
