= Hellemyr =

District Hellemyr
- District in Kristiansand
- Coat of arms

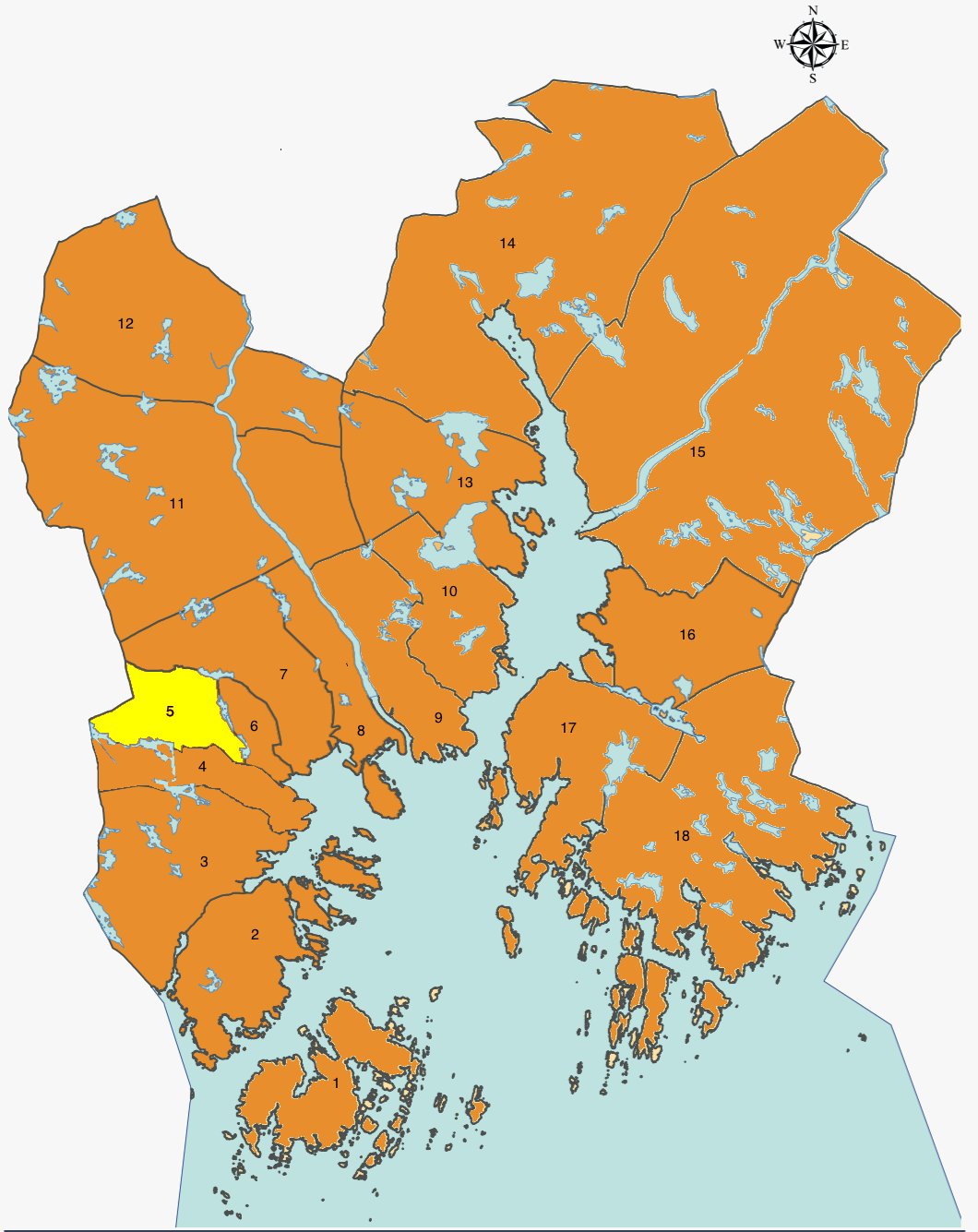
- Interactive map of District Hellemyr
- Coordinates: 58.1462°N 07.9330°E
- Country: Norway
- Region: Southern Norway
- County: Agder
- Municipality: Kristiansand
- Borough: Grim
- Elevation: 117 m (384 ft)

Population (2014)
  - Total: 2,990
- Time zone: UTC+01:00 (CET)
  - Summer (DST): UTC+02:00 (CEST)
- ISO 3166 code: NO-030112
- Website: kristiansand.kommune.no

Hellemyr is a district in the city of Kristiansand in Agder county, Norway. It has a population of 2,990 (in 2014). The district is located in the borough of Grim. The district of Tinnheia lies to the east, the district of Slettheia lies to the south and the district of Grim lies to the north. Hellemyr is the last district to drive through before exiting Kristiansand via the European route E39 highway.

Hellemyr has one elementary school, and the junior high students attend Grim skole. Public transportation is available by bus, Nettbuss connects the district to the city centre in Kvadraturen. Buses from Hellemyr also connect to Tømmerstø. Hellemyr is mostly typical Norwegian residential suburb. Hellemyr Church is located in this district.

== Transportation ==
Bus transportation from Tinnheia
Line	Destination
17	Hellemyr - Tømmerstø
17	Hellemyr - Tømmerstø-Frikstad
18	Hellemyr - Tømmerstø Odderhei-Holte
18	Hellemyr - Dvergsnes
N16	Hellemyr - Tinnheia - Kvadraturen

== Politics ==
The 10 largest political parties in Hellemyr in 2015:

Kristiansand City Council	Percent of votes	Votes
Labour Party	34,9%	447
Conservative Party	21,9%	281
Christian Democratic Party	16,1%	207
Progress Party	8,6%	110
Liberal Party	3,7%	48
The Democrats	3,6%	46
Green Party	3%	46
Socialist Left Party	2,7%	39
Red Party	1,6%	34
Centre Party	1,5%	20

== Neighbourhoods ==
- Breimyr
- Fidjemoen
- Fjellro
- Hellemyr nordøst
- Hellemyr vest

== Photos ==
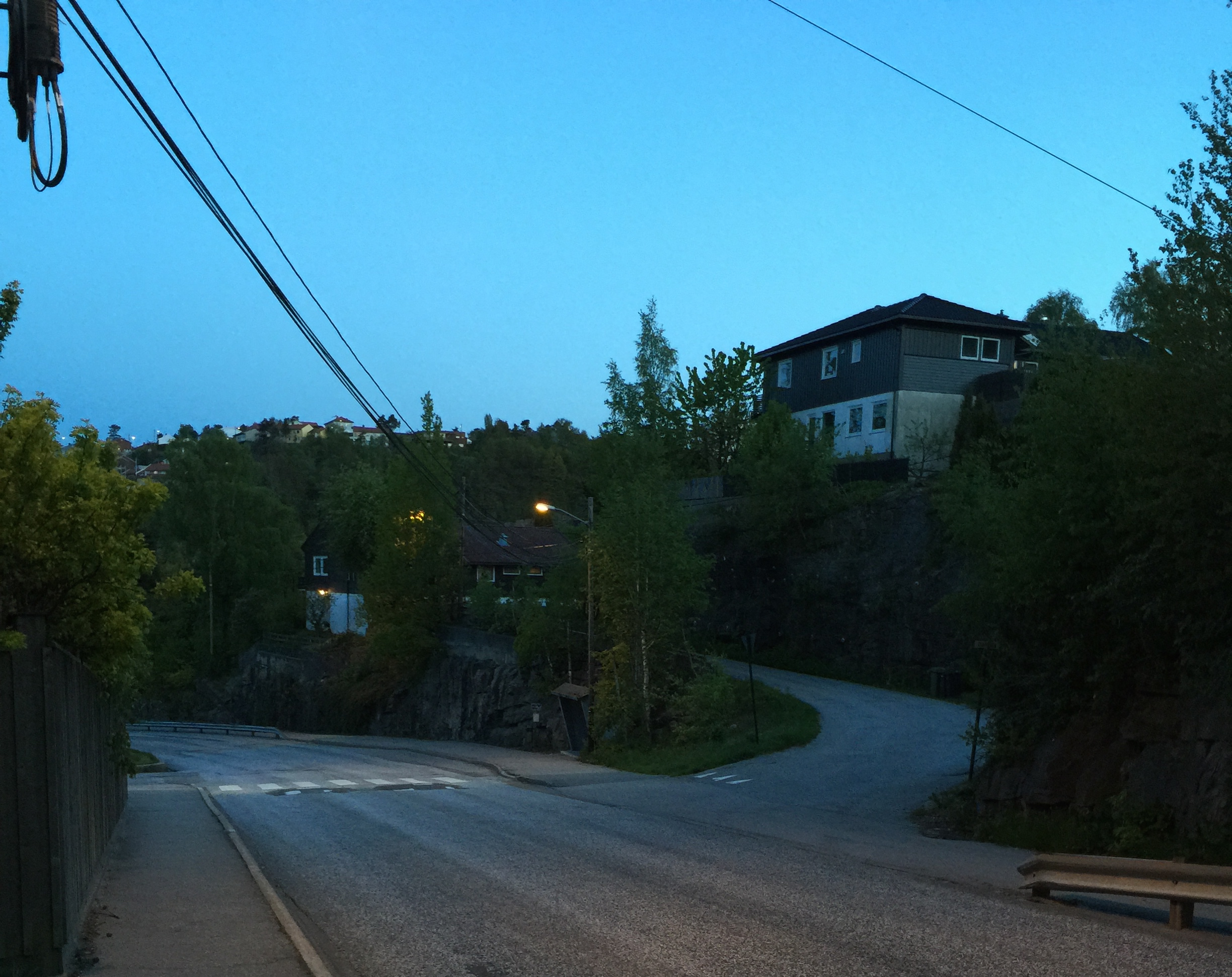
Dalbolia

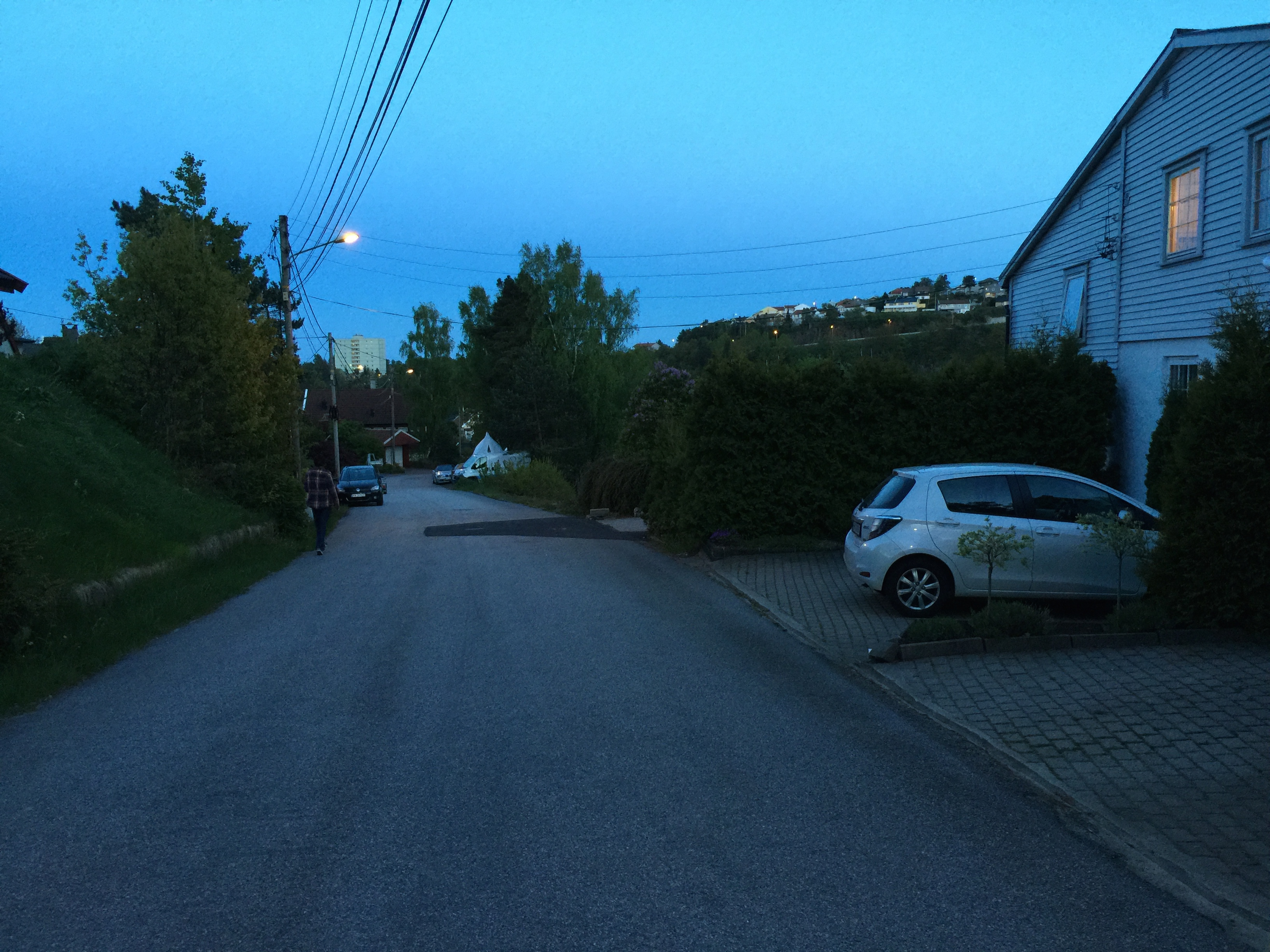
Svingen with Slettheia in the background

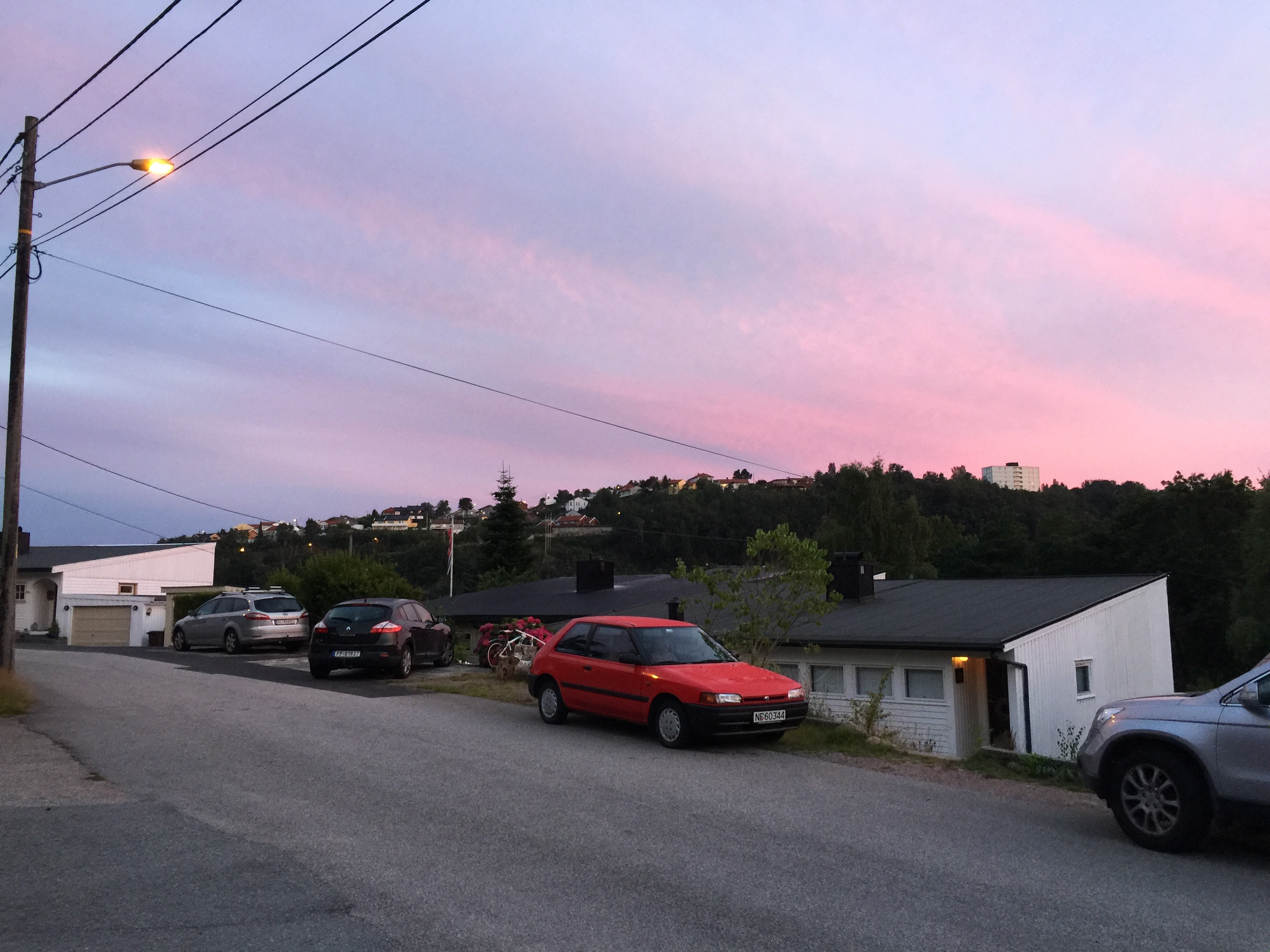
Fjellro

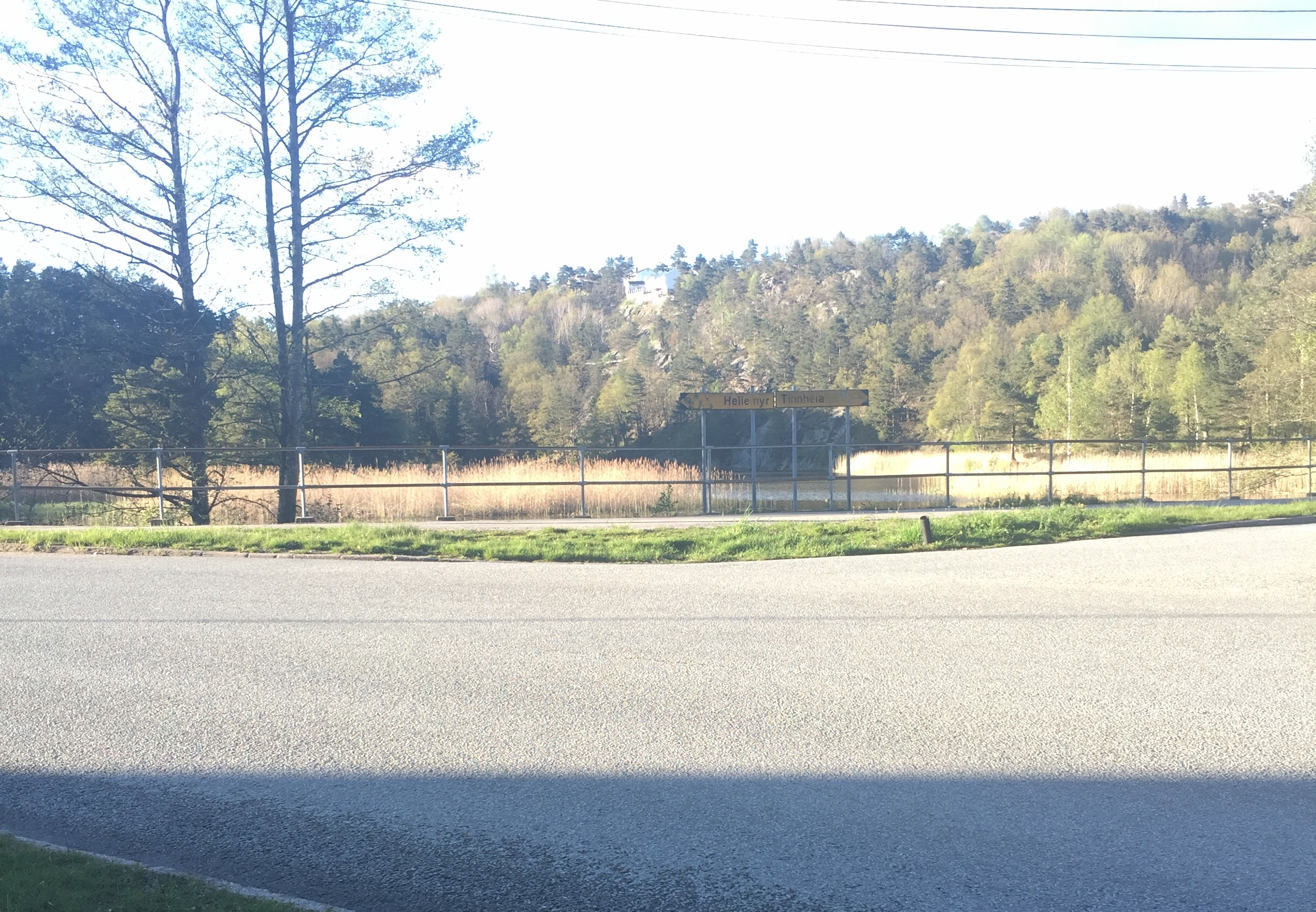
Eigevann and the Tinnheia/Hellemyr cross

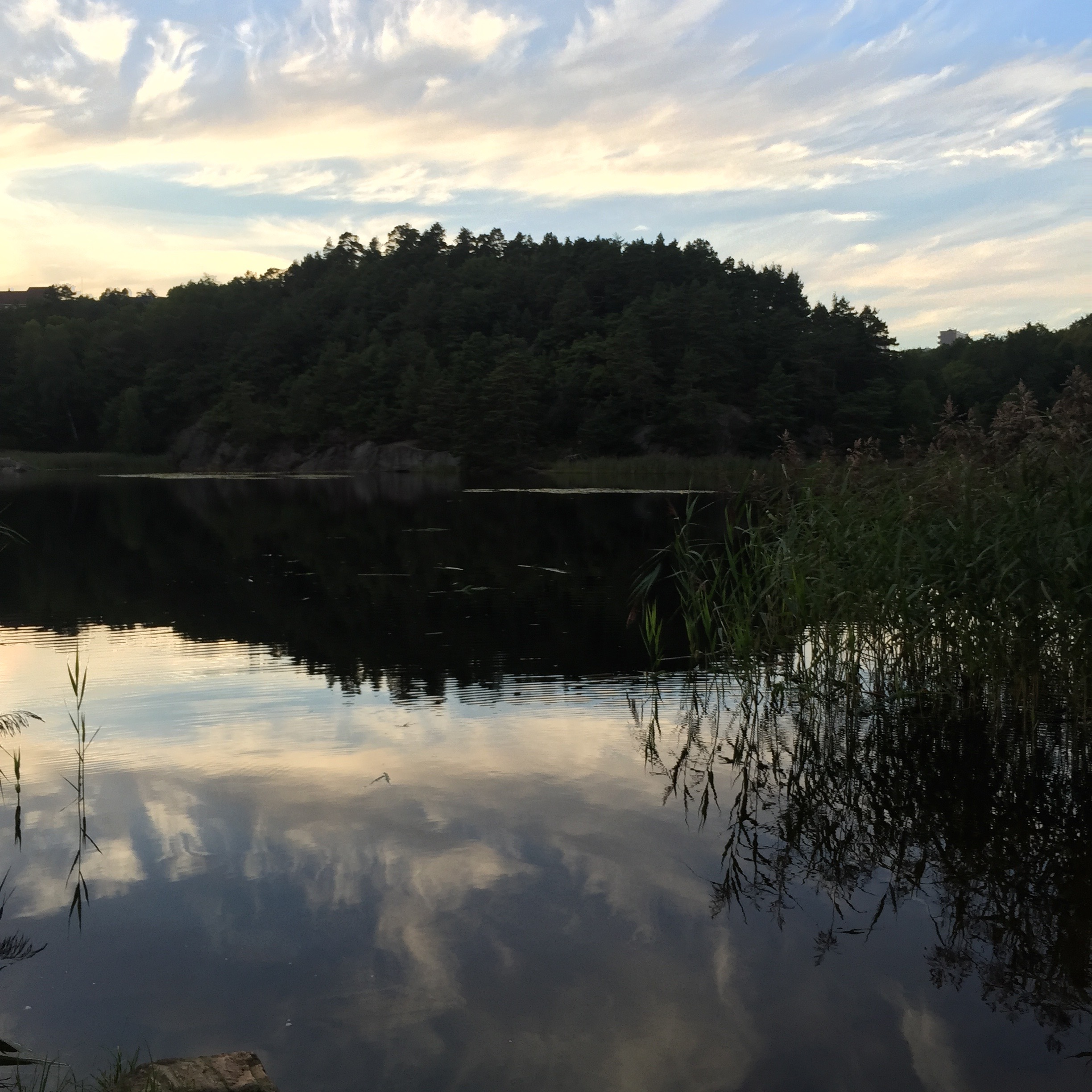
Eigevann
