= Tinnheia =

District Tinnheia
- District in Kristiansand
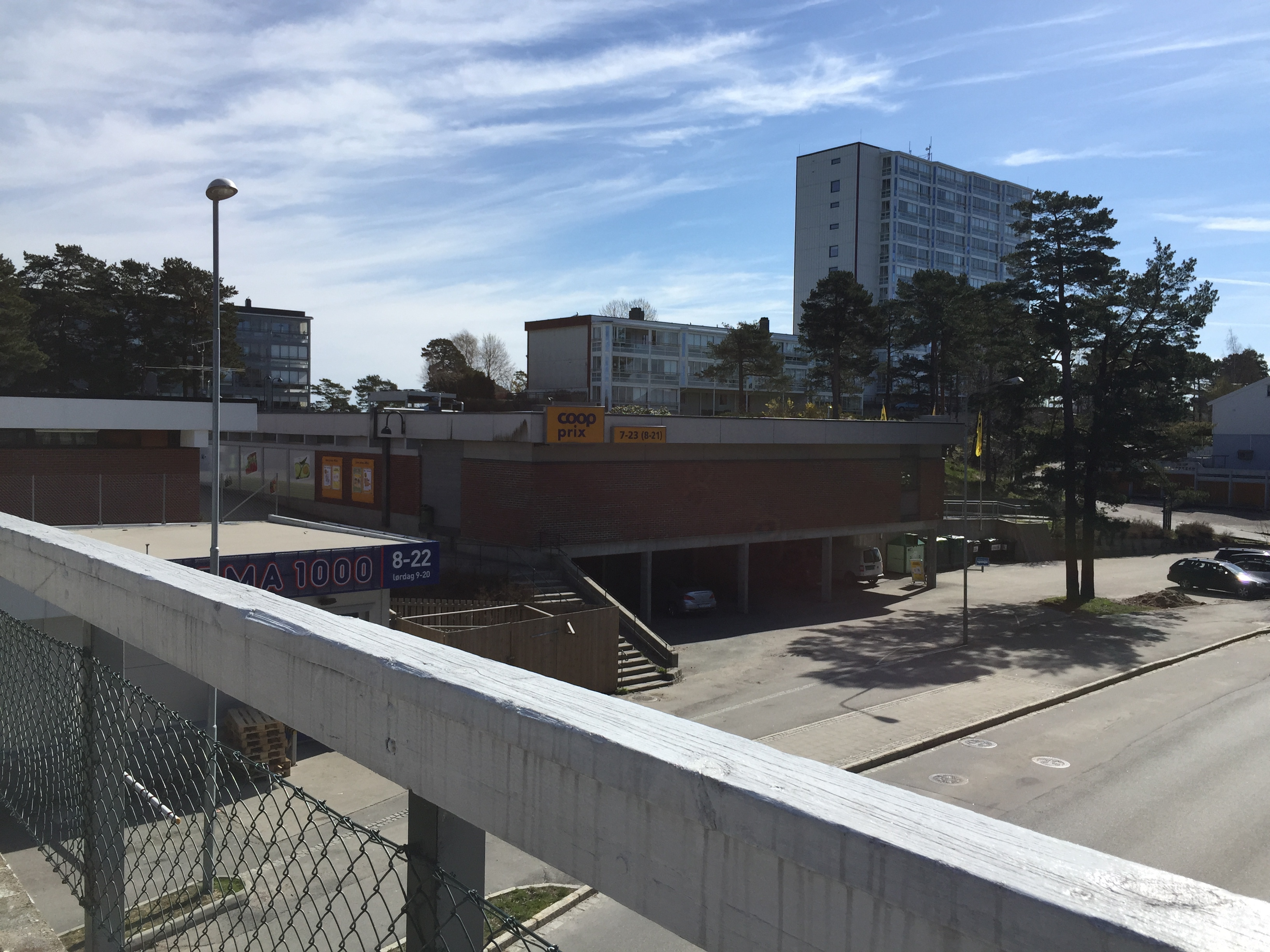
- View of the Tinnheia torv

- Coat of arms

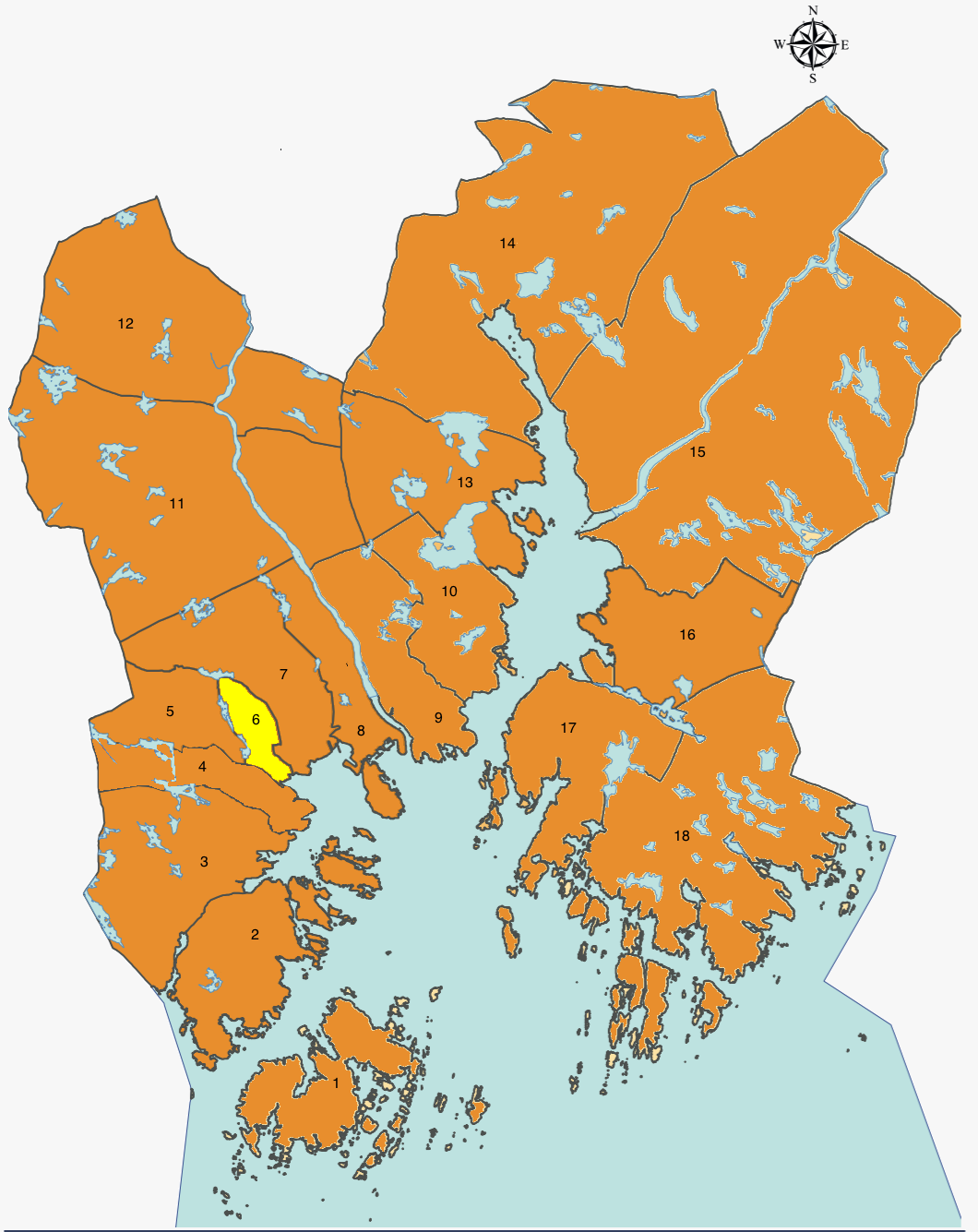
- Interactive map of District Tinnheia
- Coordinates: 58.1456°N 07.9555°E
- Country: Norway
- Region: Southern Norway
- County: Agder
- Municipality: Kristiansand
- Borough: Grim
- Elevation: 100 m (330 ft)

Population (2014)
  - Total: 3,660
- Time zone: UTC+01:00 (CET)
  - Summer (DST): UTC+02:00 (CEST)
- ISO 3166 code: NO-030112
- Website: kristiansand.kommune.no

Tinnheia is a district in the city of Kristiansand in Agder county, Norway. The population is around 3,660 (2014). It is part of the borough of Grim, and it is generally populated with mostly apartment homes, with a high percentage of immigrants. West of Tinnheia is the district of Hellemyr, to the east is the district of Grim (centrum), and to the south is the district of Slettheia.

The district of Tinnheia includes an industrial area called Hannevika. Tinnheia has one elementary school, "Karl Johan Minneskole" (Karl Johan memory school). Public transport is available by Agder Kollektivtrafikk, stops at Tinnheia are located along Line 15 which goes from Kvadraturen-Tinnheia-Kvadraturen 4 times every hour. All the streets in Tinnheia is named after metal, "Tin"-Heia. Tinnheia has the second-most apartment buildings in Kristiansand after Kvadraturen (the city centrum). Tinnheia is the smallest district in area and the 10th largest in population.

== Politics ==
The 10 largest political parties in Tinnheia (2015):

Kristiansand city council votes from Tinnheia 2015
Labour Party	38.9% (386 votes)
Conservative Party	18.7% (186 votes)
Christian Democratic Party	12.4% (116 votes)
Progress Party	9% (89 votes)
The Democrats	4.8% (48 votes)
Green Party	4.2% (42 votes)
Liberal Party	3.4% (34 votes)
Socialist Left Party	2.7% (27 votes)
Pensioners' Party	2.5% (25 votes)
Red	1.9% (19 votes)
The Christians	0.8% (8 votes)
Others	0.6% (7 votes)
Total	980 votes

== Neighbourhoods ==
- Hannevikåsen
- Hannevika
- Kolsberg
- Tinnheia nordvest
- Tinnheia sørøst

== Transportation ==
Bus transportation from Tinnheia
Line	Destination
15	Tinnheia - Kvadraturen
15	Tinnheia - Kvadraturen - UiA
N16	Hellemyr - Tinnheia - Kvadraturen

== Media gallery ==
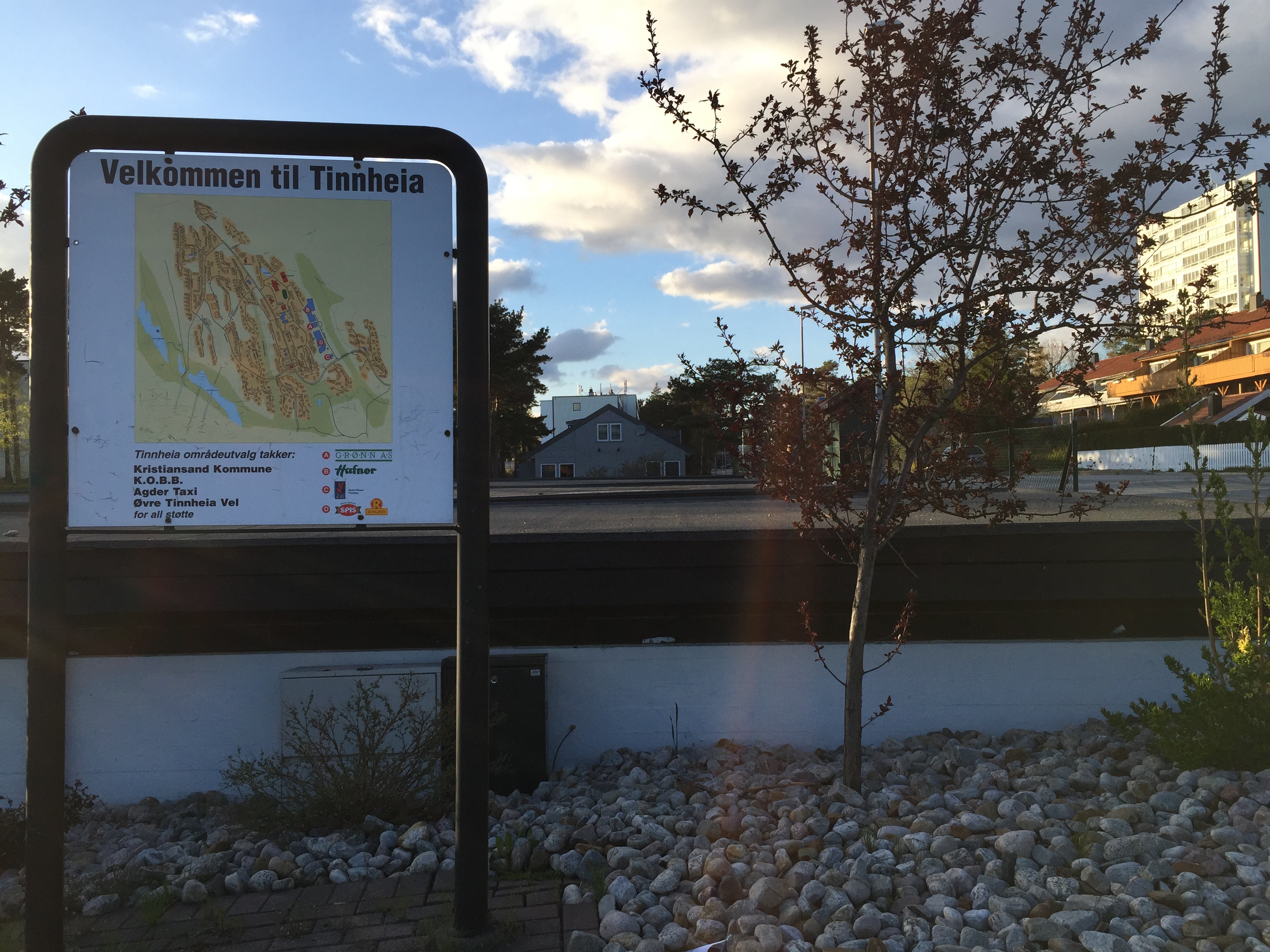
Welcome sign

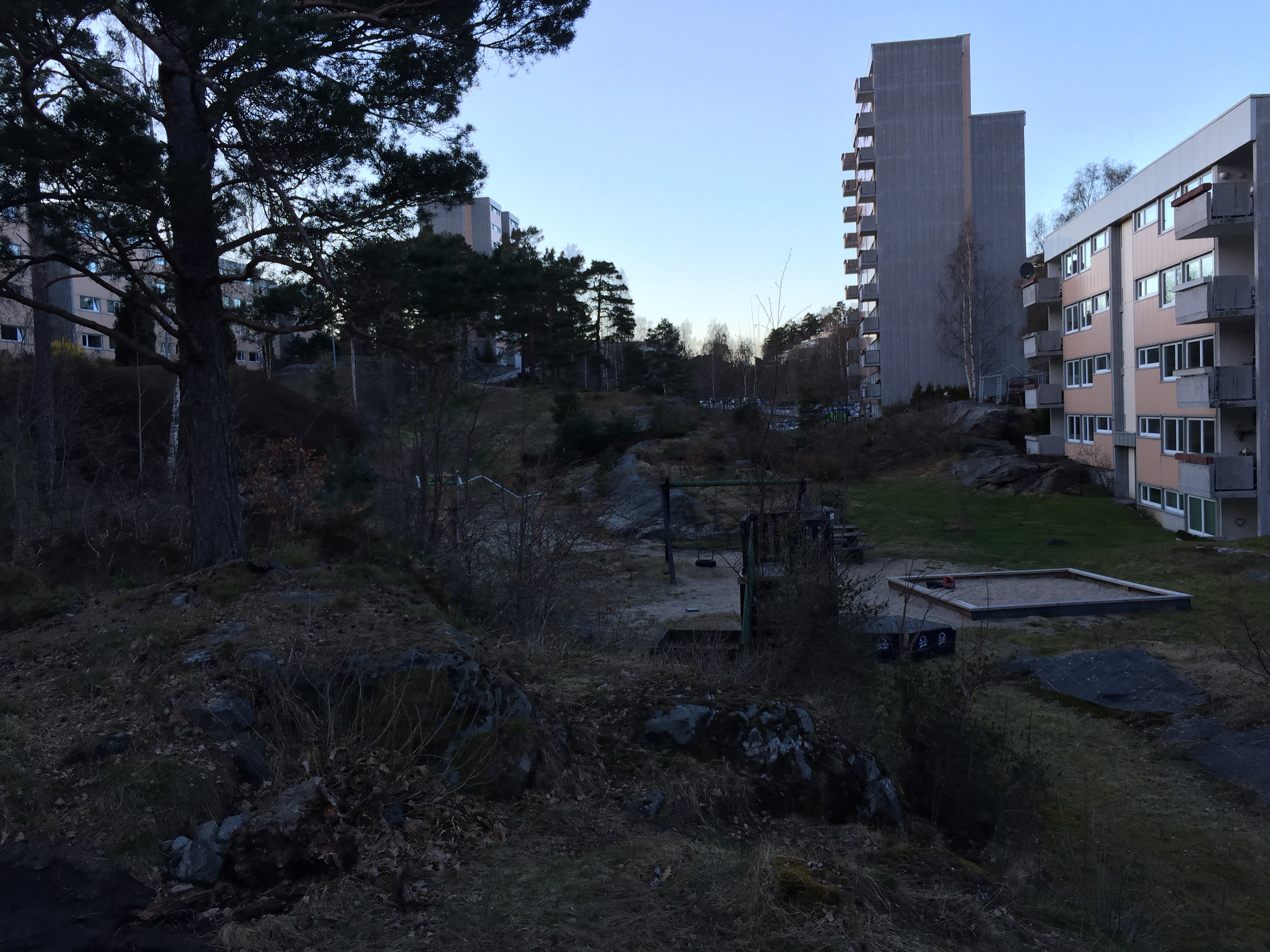
Koboltveien

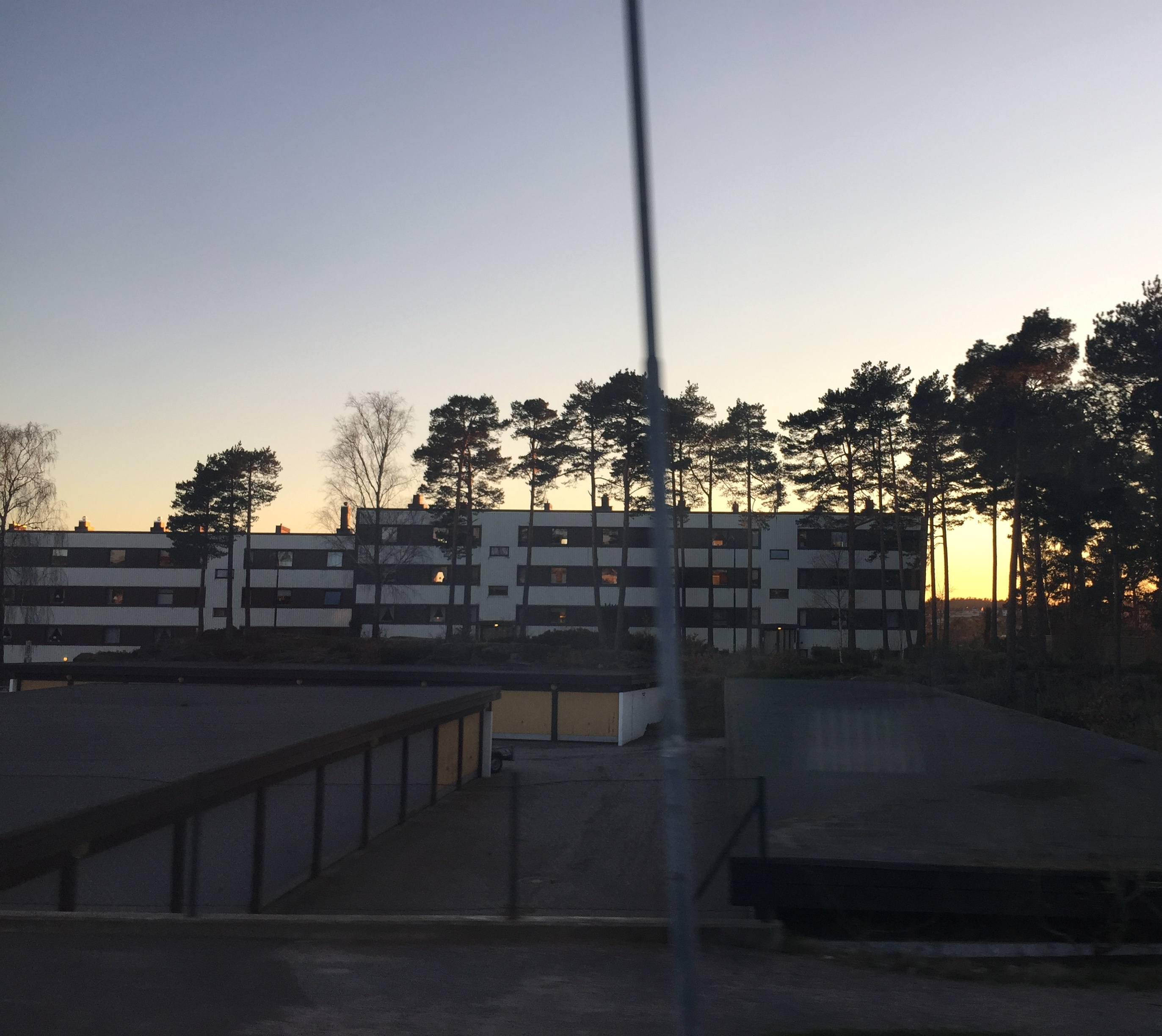
Messingveien

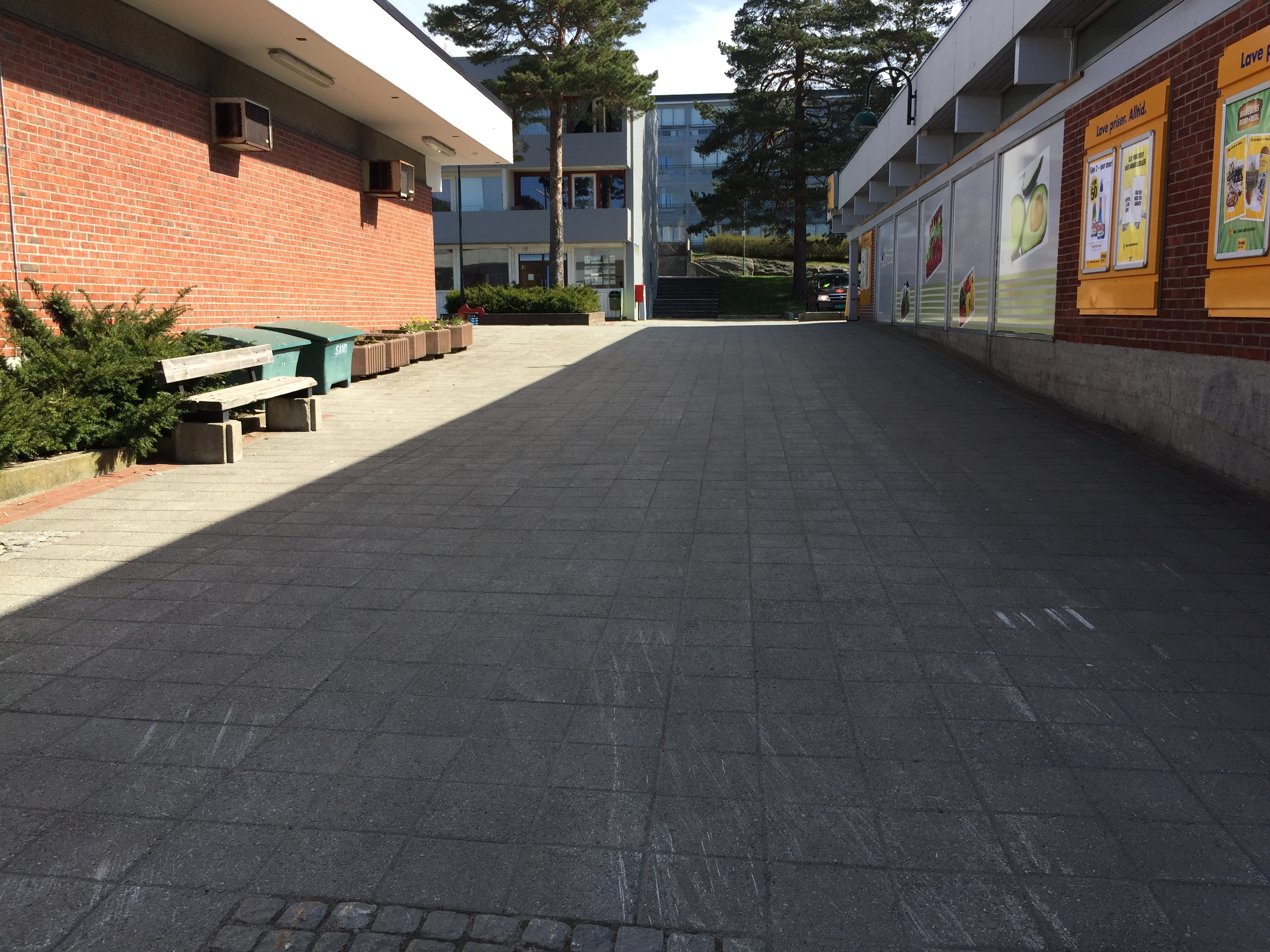
Tinnheia torv

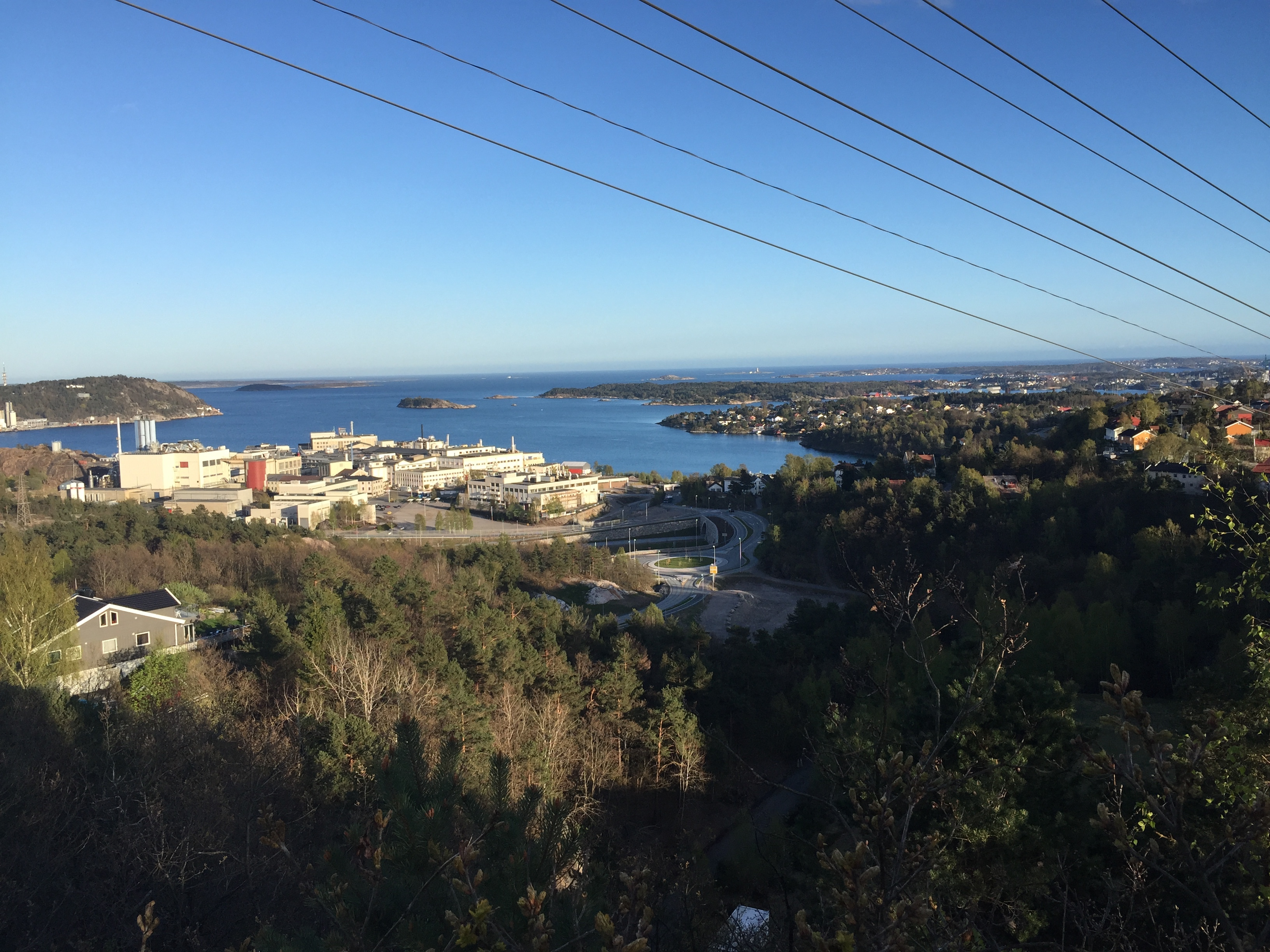
View from Tinnheia to Hannevika

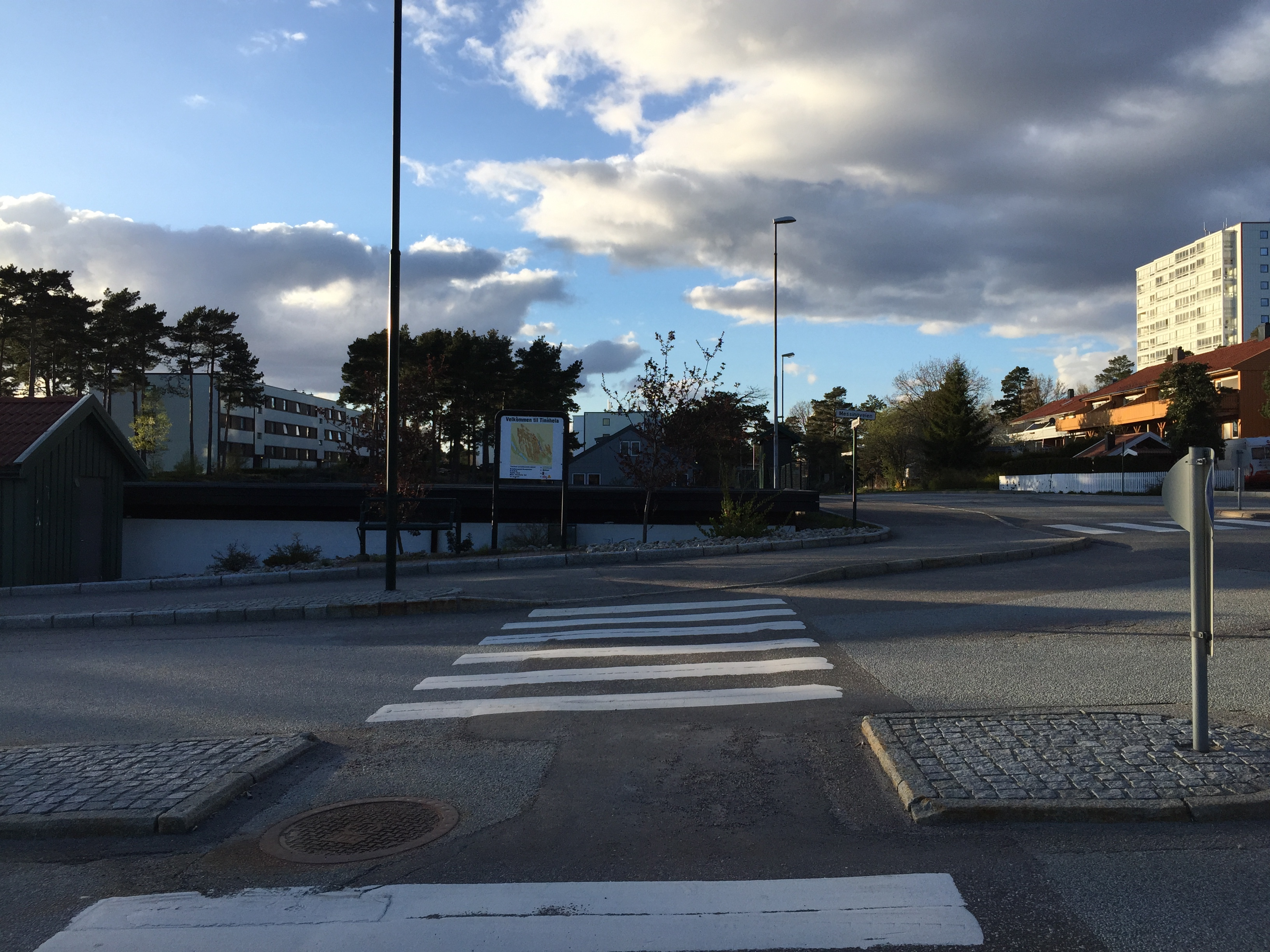
Tinnheiatoppen

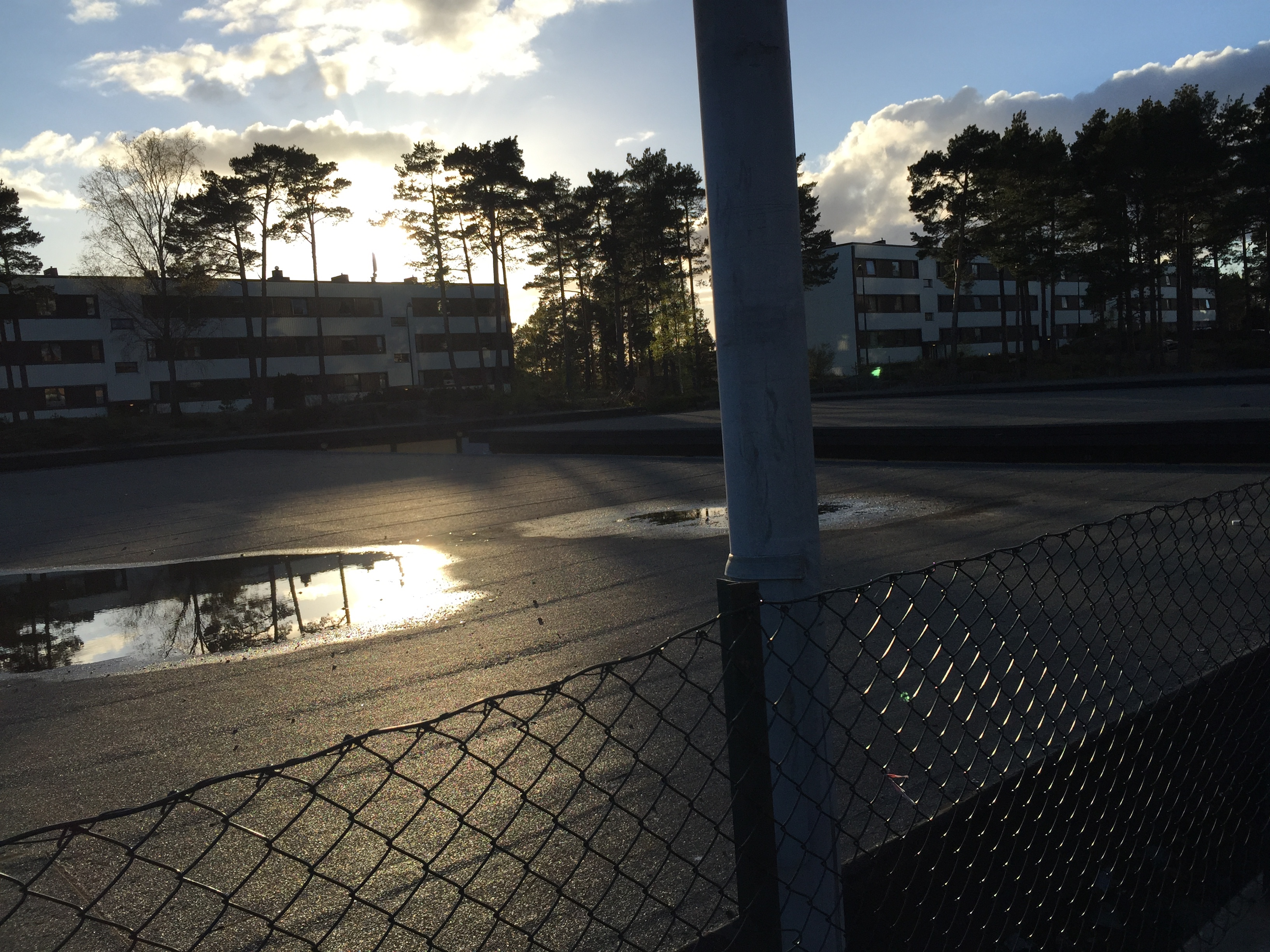
Kolsberg

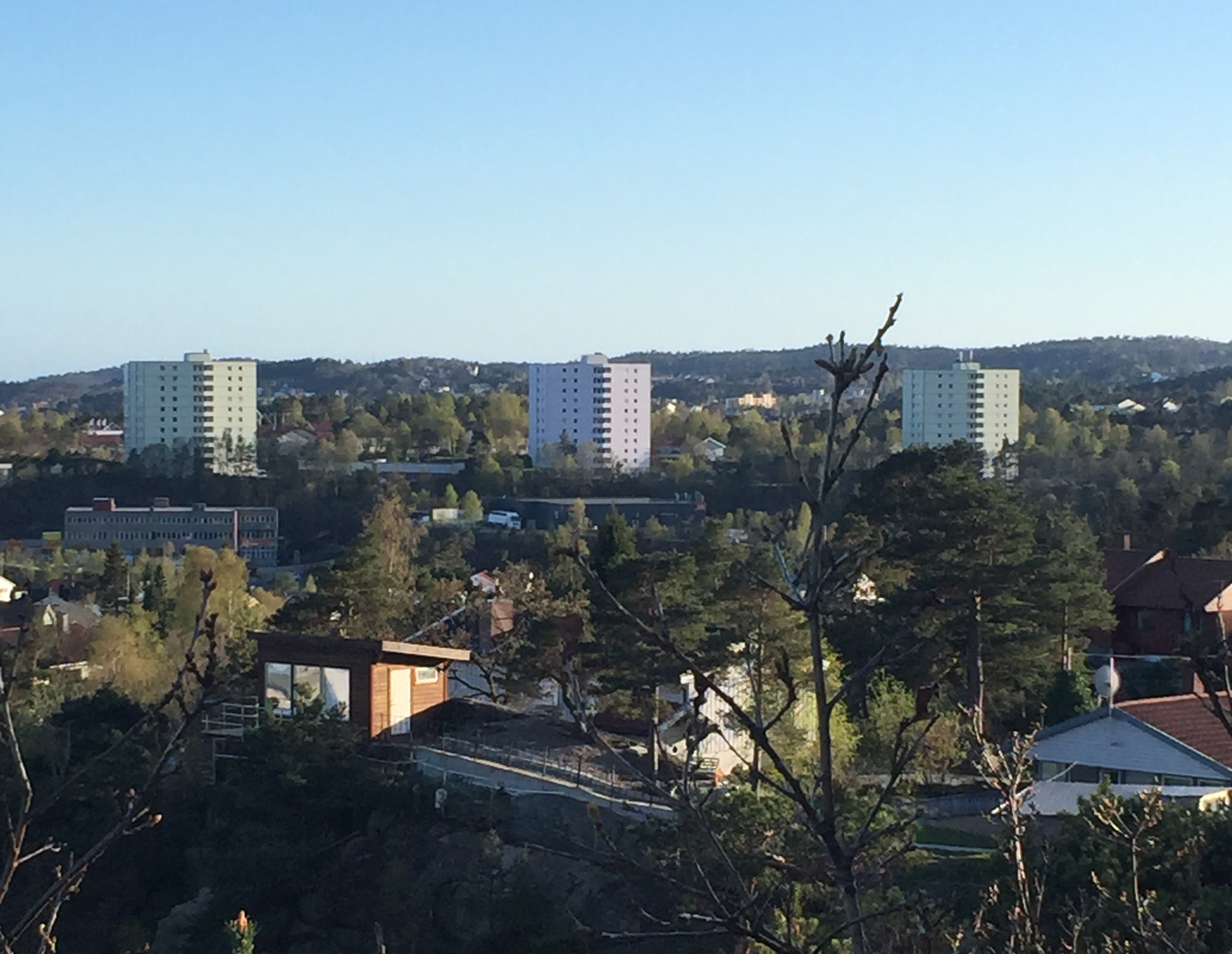
View from Tinnheia to Slettheia

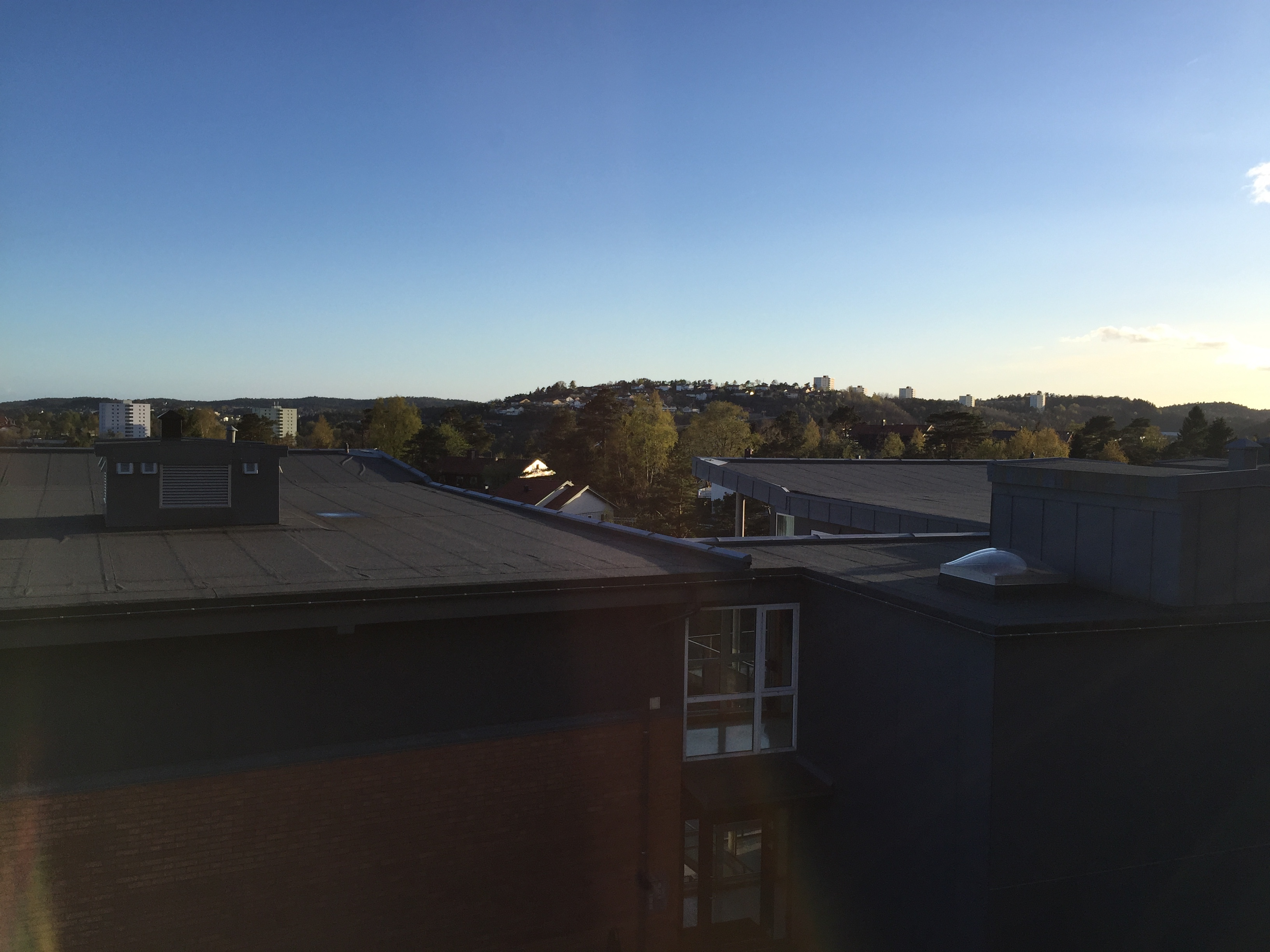
Hannevikåsen

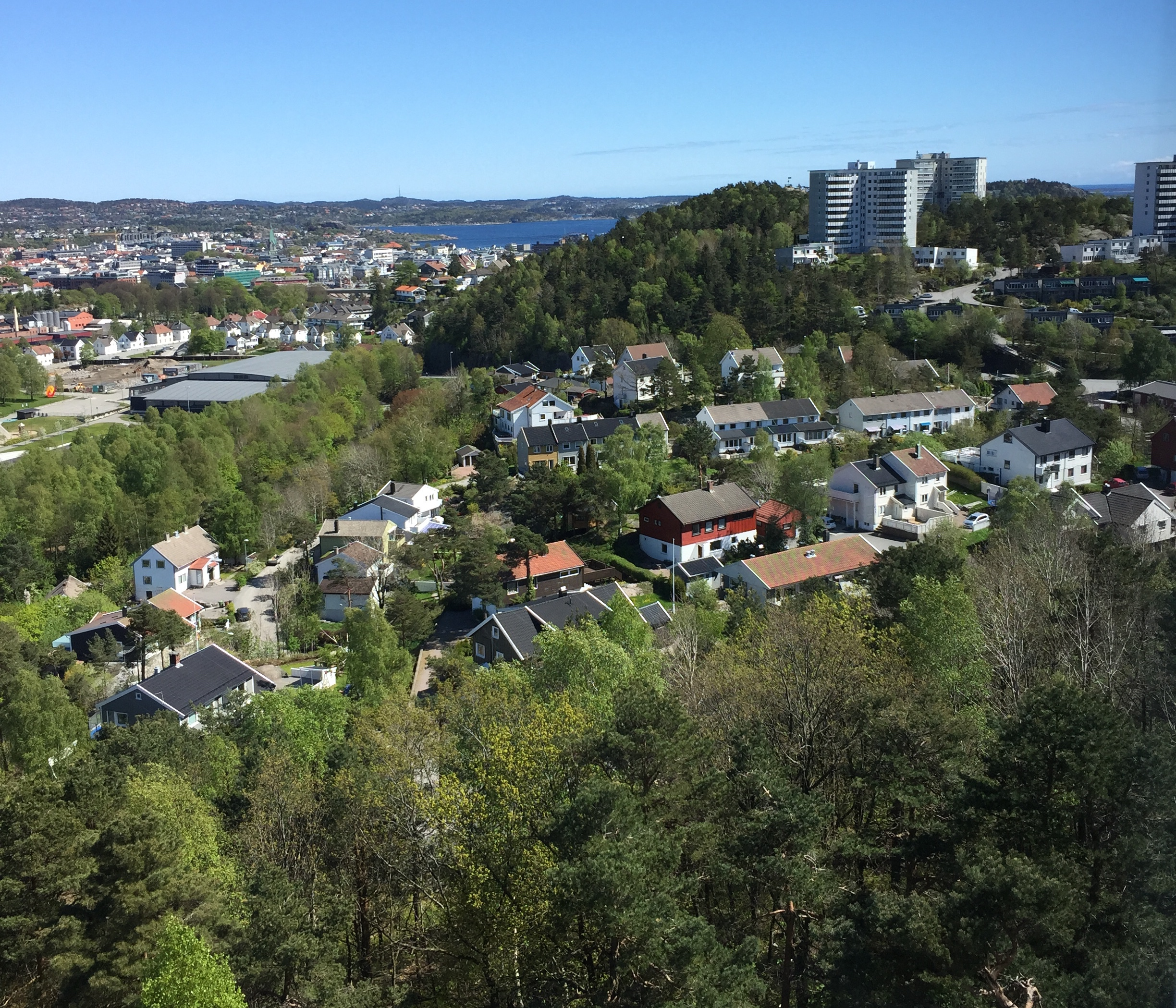
Tinnheiatoppen

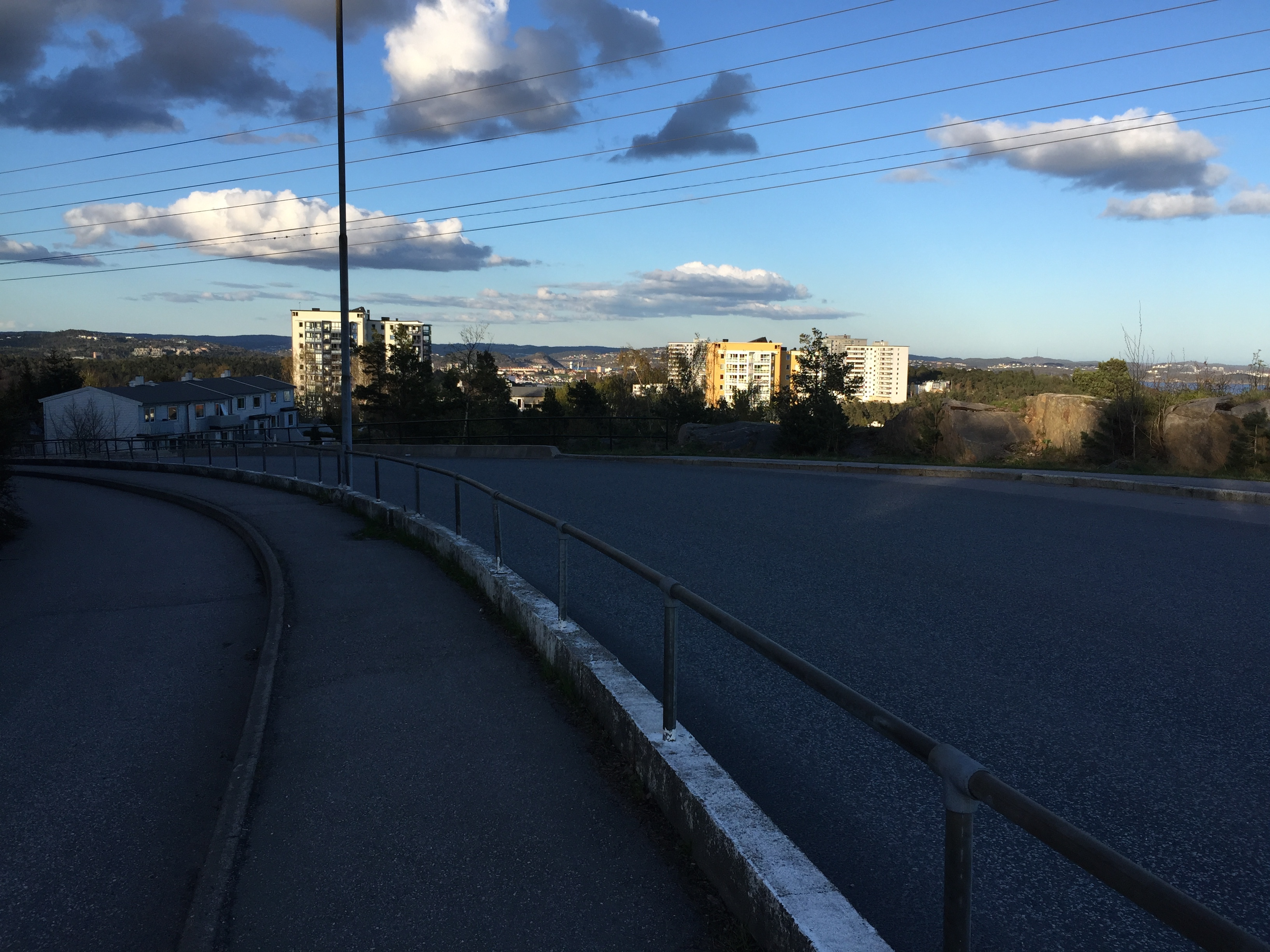
Kolsåsen

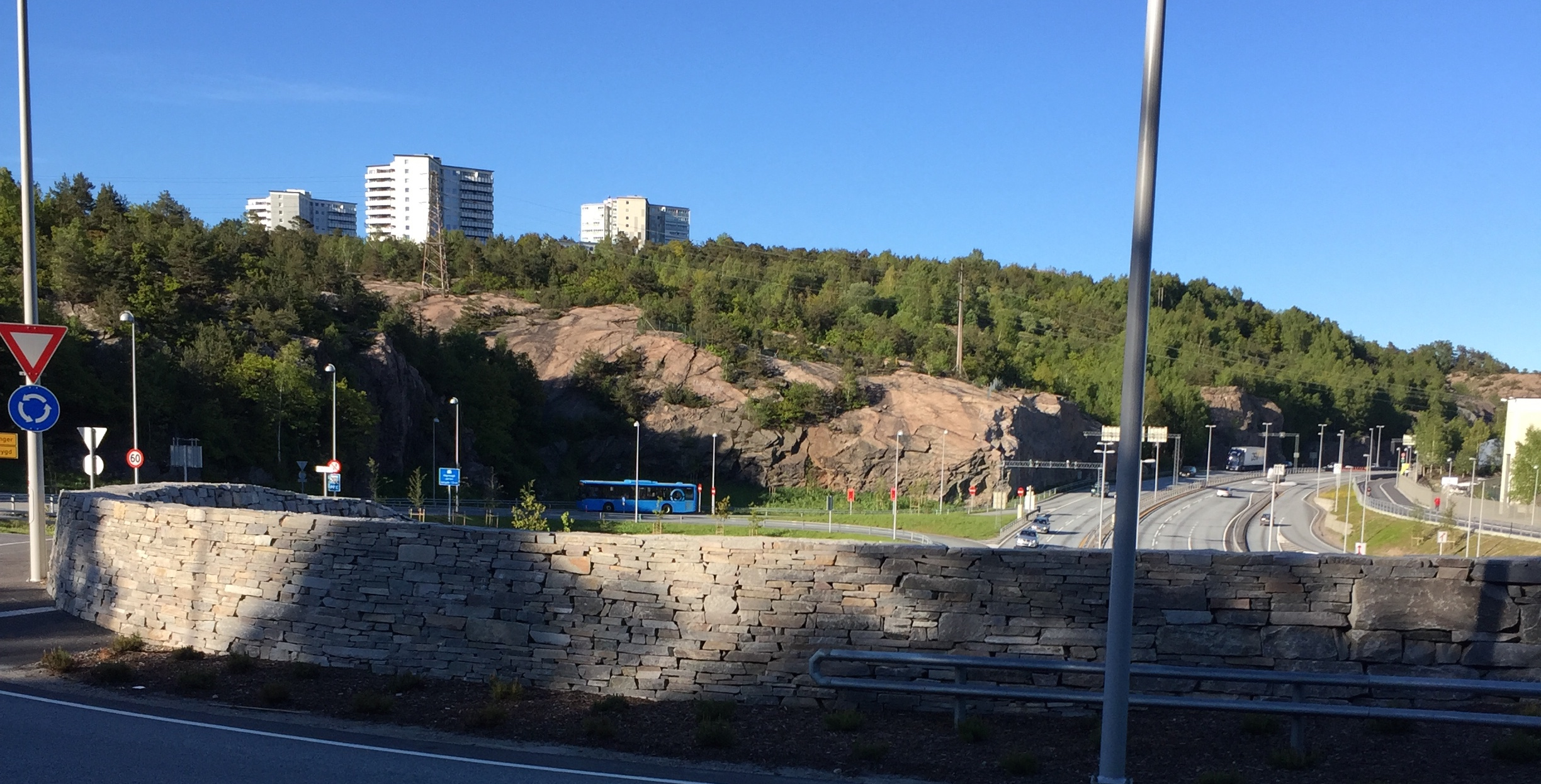
Kolsberg from Hannevika

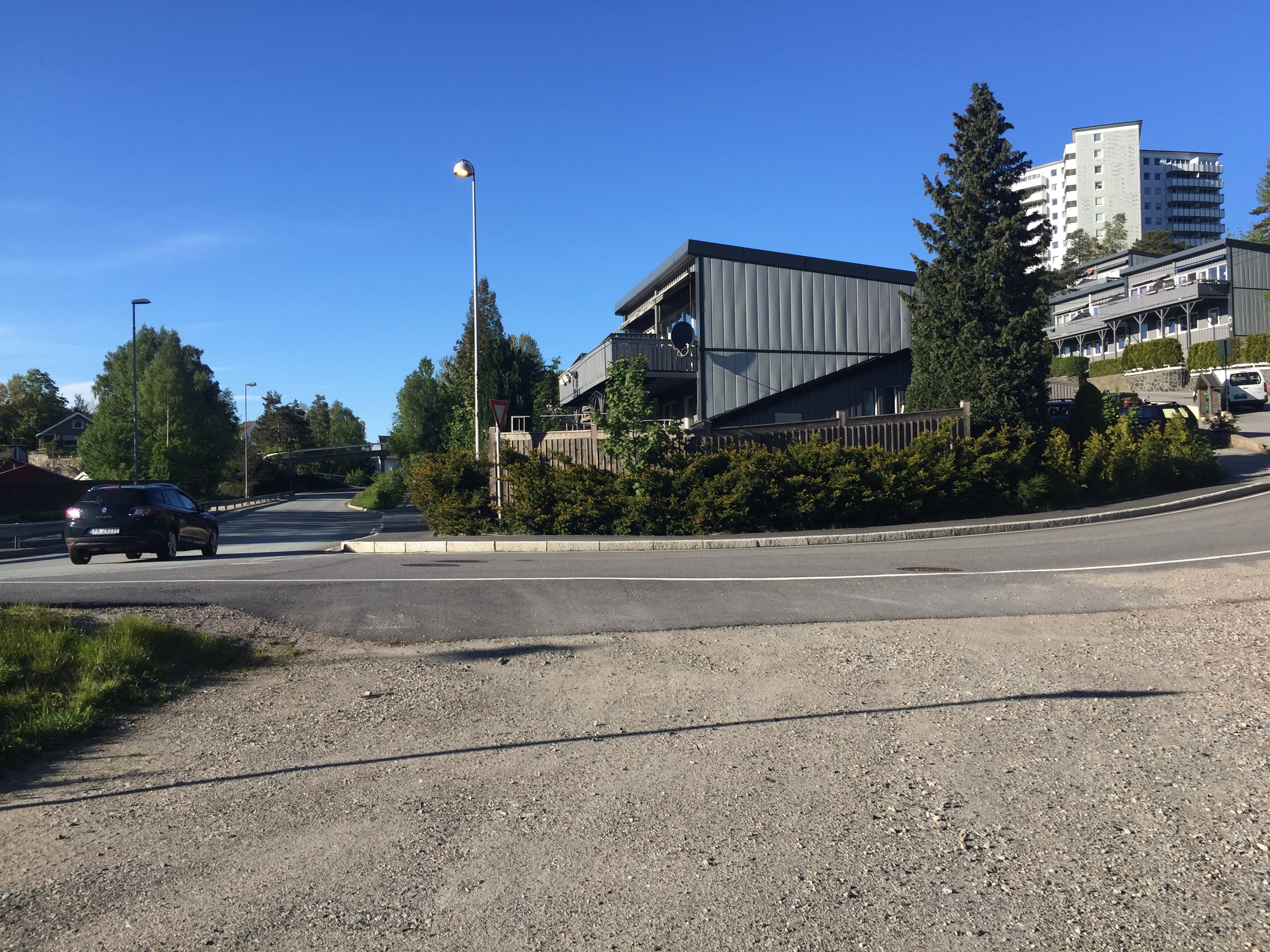
Kolsberg

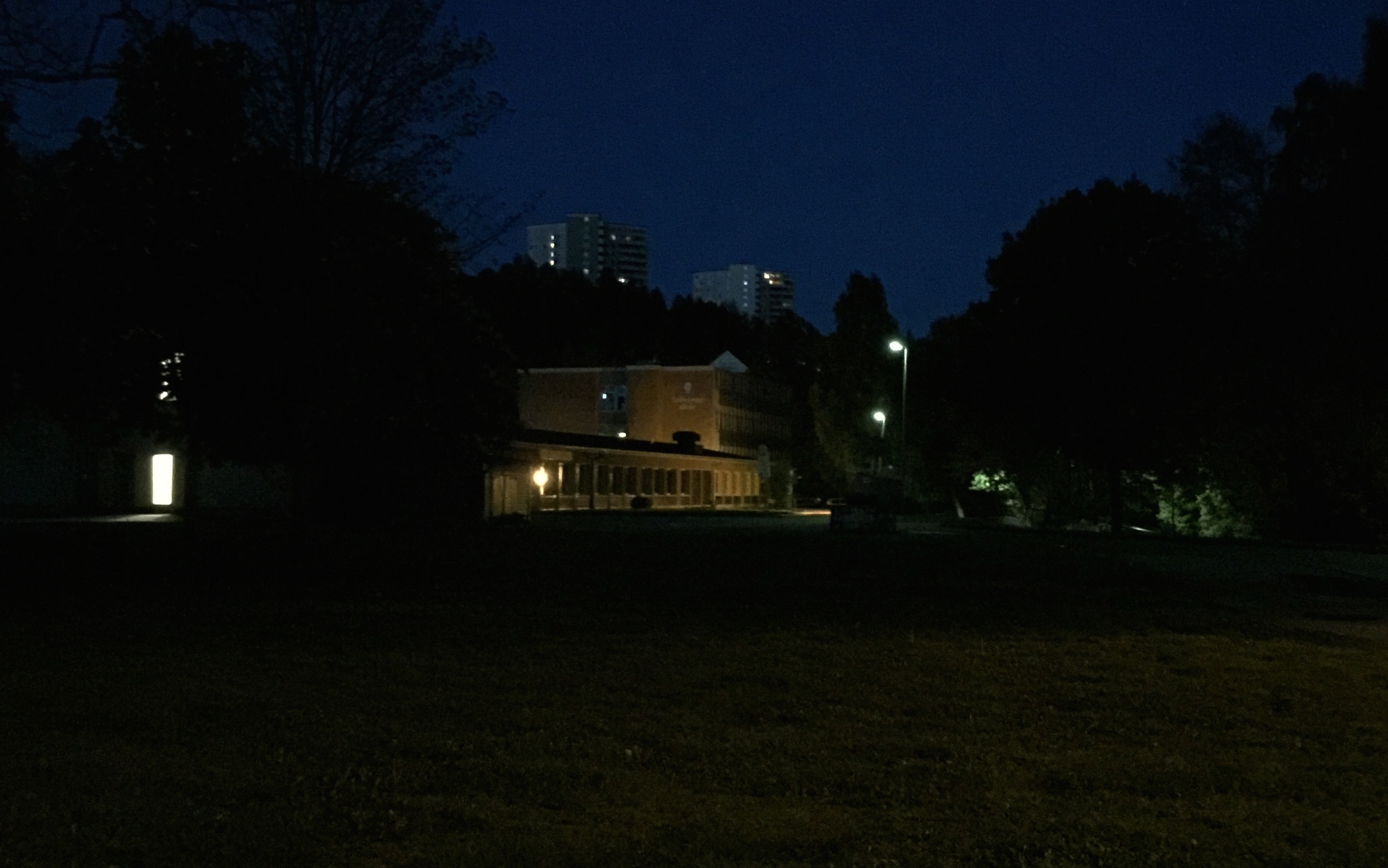
Kolsberg from Grim
