= Slettheitoppen =

Slettheitoppen Øvre Slettheia
- Neighborhood in Kristiansand
- Interactive map of Slettheitoppen
- Coordinates: 58.1372°N 07.9282°E
- Country: Norway
- County: Agder
- Municipality: Kristiansand
- Borough: Vågsbygd
- District: Slettheia
- Elevation: 137 m (449 ft)
- Time zone: UTC+01:00 (CET)
  - Summer (DST): UTC+02:00 (CEST)
- Postal code: 4626
- Area code: 38

Slettheitoppen or Øvre Slettheia is a neighbourhood in the city of Kristiansand in Agder county, Norway. It is located in the borough of Vågsbygd and in the district of Slettheia. The neighborhood lies west of Trane and northwest of Nedre Slettheia. The Øvre Slettheia skole is an elementary school in the neighbourhood.

== Transportation ==
Bus line M3 stops at Øvre Slettheia and continues to Vågsbygd Church, Søm, or Kvadraturen.

Bus lines through Slettheitoppen
Line	Destinations
M3	Slettheia - Søm
D3	Slettheia - Søm
