= Bragdøya =

Island in Agder, Norway

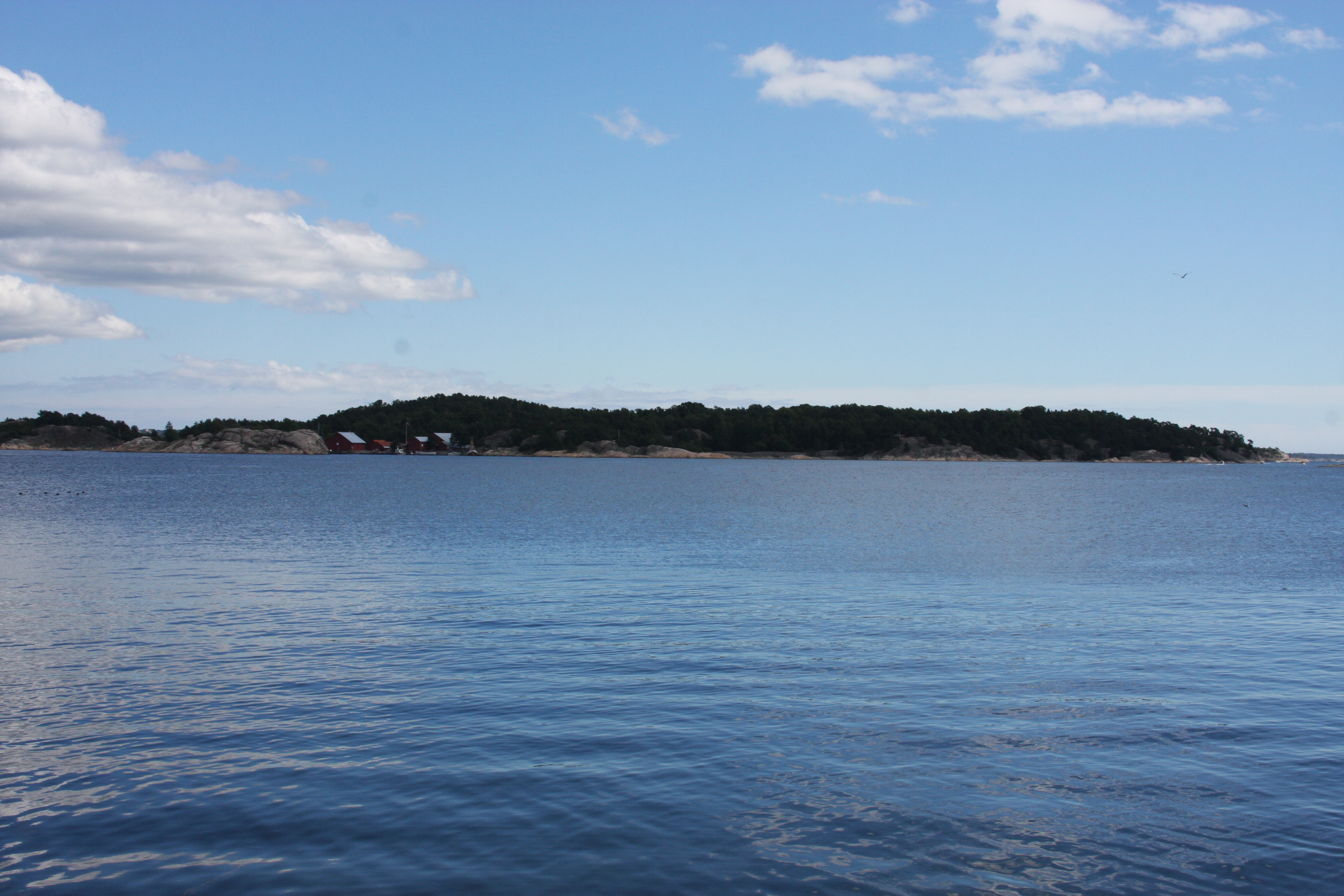
- Bragdøya as seen from the west
- Interactive map of the island

Geography
- Location: Agder, Norway
- Coordinates: 58.11862°N 7.99259°E
- Area: 0.7 km^{2} (0.27 sq mi)
- Length: 1.5 km (0.93 mi)
- Width: 600 m (2000 ft)
- Coastline: 5.3 km (3.29 mi)
- Highest elevation: 35 m (115 ft)

Administration
- Norway
- County: Agder
- Municipality: Kristiansand Municipality

Demographics
- Population: 0 (2015)

Bragdøya is an uninhabited island in Kristiansand Municipality in Agder county, Norway. The 0.7-square-kilometre (0.27 sq mi) island is in the archipelago in the Kristiansandsfjorden, just south of the city of Kristiansand. The island is surrounded by the smaller islands of Svensholmen and Langøya to the north (across the narrow Bragdøyrenna strait) and the island of Hestehaue to the southeast. The heavily populated island of Andøya lies to the southwest.

Bragdøya has been owned by Kristiansand Municipality since 1969 when they bought it with a government grant as a public open space. It was purchased with the requirement that the islands would be a recreational space for the city. During the summer, the island is also used as grazing land for sheep.

== History ==
For centuries, Bragdøya has been inhabited. "Siffuord Bragdøen" is mentioned in written sources as owner from 1610 and onwards. The first manor house in Kristiansand was built in Bragdøya around 1770 for the family of Henrik Arnold Thaulow. Thaulow was the grandfather of Oscar Wergeland, Henrik Wergeland, and Camilla Collett, and his grandchildren spent time on the island during the summers. There are several older cottages on the island.

In 1915, two large warehouses were built on the west side of Bragdøya where mackerel was salted and packed for export. The business did not go particularly well, however, and in the interwar period the business was ended.

The Nazi German occupiers committed executions of at least 28 Soviet POWs on Bragdøya during World War II.

== Leisure ==
Bragdøya Kystlag, a voluntary association which aims to preserve local maritime culture along the coast, is now the owner of the warehouse complex named Bragdøya Coastal Heritage Centre. From 1996-2012, the centre hosted an annual blues festival. On certain days there are organized boat trips to the island. There is a special boat from the city centre of Kristiansand during the Norwegian school holidays which makes a round trip of Bragdøya and several other islands.

== See also ==
- List of islands of Norway
