= Kjerrheia =

- Neighborhood in Kristiansand
- Interactive map of Kjerrheia
- Coordinates: 58.1275°N 07.9554°E
- Country: Norway
- County: Agder
- Municipality: Kristiansand
- Borough: Vågsbygd
- District: Vågsbygd
- Elevation: 30 m (98 ft)
- Time zone: UTC+01:00 (CET)
  - Summer (DST): UTC+02:00 (CEST)

Kjerrheia is a neighbourhood in the city of Kristiansand in Agder county, Norway. It is located in the borough of Vågsbygd and in the district of Vågsbygd. The neighborhood is located west of Fiskåtangen, north of Augland, and east of Hasselbakken.
