= Fiskåtangen =

Fiskåtangen Fiskå
- Neighborhood in Kristiansand
- Interactive map of Fiskåtangen
- Coordinates: 58.1304°N 07.9718°E
- Country: Norway
- County: Agder
- Municipality: Kristiansand
- Borough: Vågsbygd
- District: Slettheia
- Elevation: 16 m (52 ft)
- Time zone: UTC+01:00 (CET)
  - Summer (DST): UTC+02:00 (CEST)
- Postal code: 4623
- Area code: 38

Fiskåtangen or Fiskå is a neighbourhood and small peninsula in the city of Kristiansand in Agder county, Norway. It is located in the borough of Vågsbygd and in the district of Slettheia. The islands of Svensholmen and Bragdøya lie to the southeast off the coast of Fiskåtangen. The neighborhood is located to the west of Kjerrheia and north of Lumber. Fiskåtangen has the only junior high for the district of Slettheia. Fiskåtangen has a large industrial area serving Vågsbygd and Kristiansand. The local newspaper Fædrelandsvennen was headquartered at Fiskå before it relocated to Kvadraturen in the summer of 2015.
