= Slettheia =

District Slettheia
- District in Kristiansand
- Coat of arms

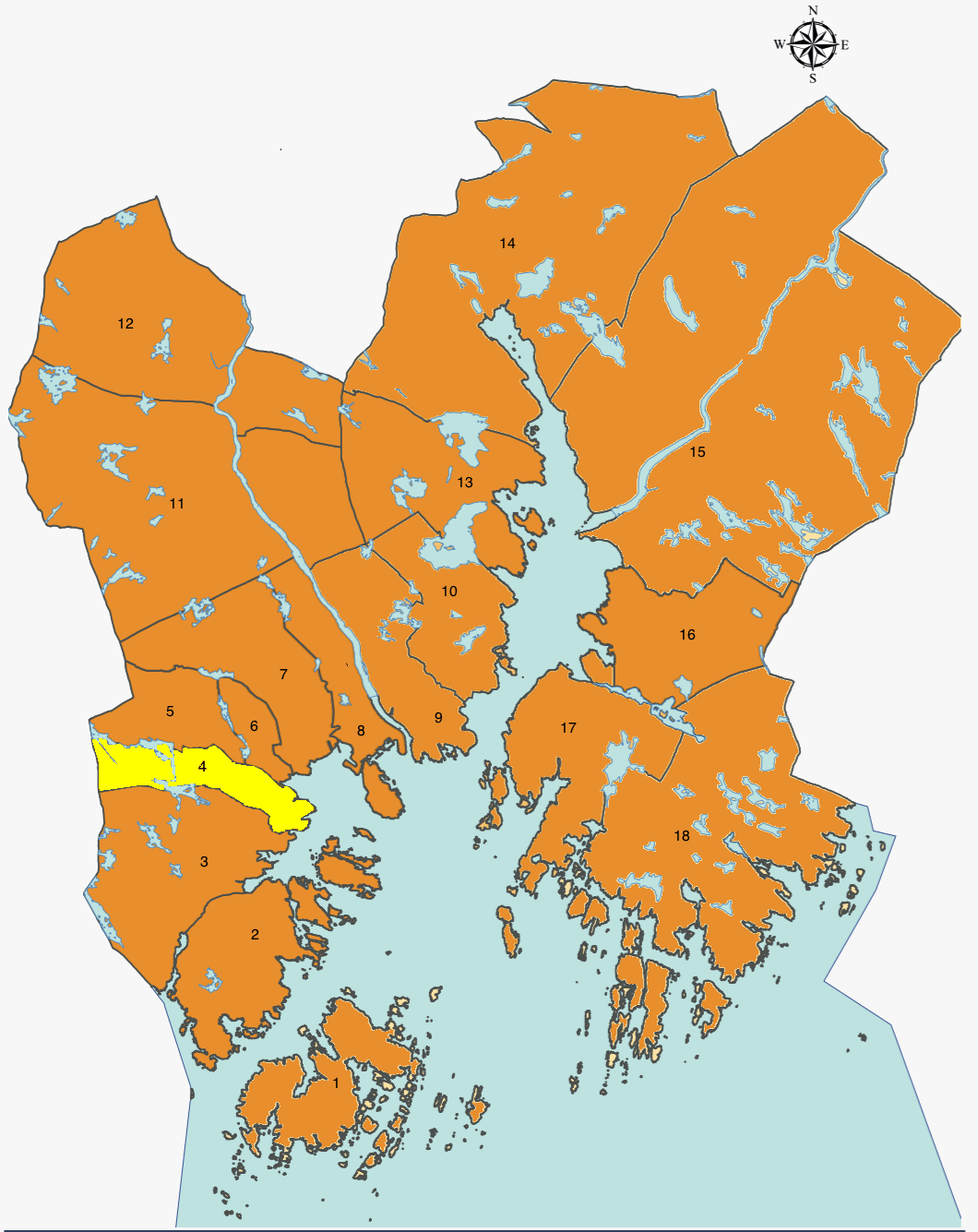
- Interactive map of District Slettheia
- Coordinates: 58.1374°N 07.9346°E
- Country: Norway
- Region: Southern Norway
- County: Agder
- Municipality: Kristiansand
- Borough: Vågsbygd
- Elevation: 109 m (358 ft)

Population (2014)
  - Total: 4,000
- Time zone: UTC+01:00 (CET)
  - Summer (DST): UTC+02:00 (CEST)
- ISO 3166 code: NO-030112
- Website: kristiansand.kommune.no

Slettheia is a district in the borough of Vågsbygd in the city of Kristiansand in Agder county, Norway. The population was about 4,000 in 2014. It is the most populated immigrant settlement in Kristiansand. The district was the childhood home of Crown Princess Mette-Marit of Norway. Public transportation is available with local city buses every day. Slettheia has one elementary and one junior high, the closest high school is "Vågsbygd High School".

== Demographic ==
Slettheia has about 4,000 residents (in 2014) and it is the district in Kristiansand with the highest percentage of immigrants in the city with about 36% of residents being immigrants. Approximately 31% are from Africa and Asia while another 4% are from Europe and North-America.

== Transportation ==
Bus transportation from Slettheia
Line	Destination
M3	Slettheia – Søm
M3	Slettheia – Vågsbygd kirke
D3	Slettheia – Kvadraturen
D3	Slettheia – Kvadraturen – UiA

== Politics ==
The 10 largest political parties in Slettheia in 2015:

Kristiansand City Council	Percent votes	Votes
Labour Party	35,8%	478
Conservative Party	19,3%	258
Christian Democratic Party	12,4%	165
Progress Party	9,4%	125
The Democrats	5,6%	75
Socialist Left Party	4,2%	56
Liberal Party	4%	53
Green Party	3%	40
Red	2,6%	35
The Pensioners'	2,1%	28
Others	1,8%	27
Total	100%	1340

== Neighbourhoods ==
- Fiskåtangen
- Gislemyr
- Kartheia
- Nedre Slettheia
- Slettheia sør
- Slettheitoppen vest
- Slettheitoppen øst
- Slettheiveien

== Media gallery ==
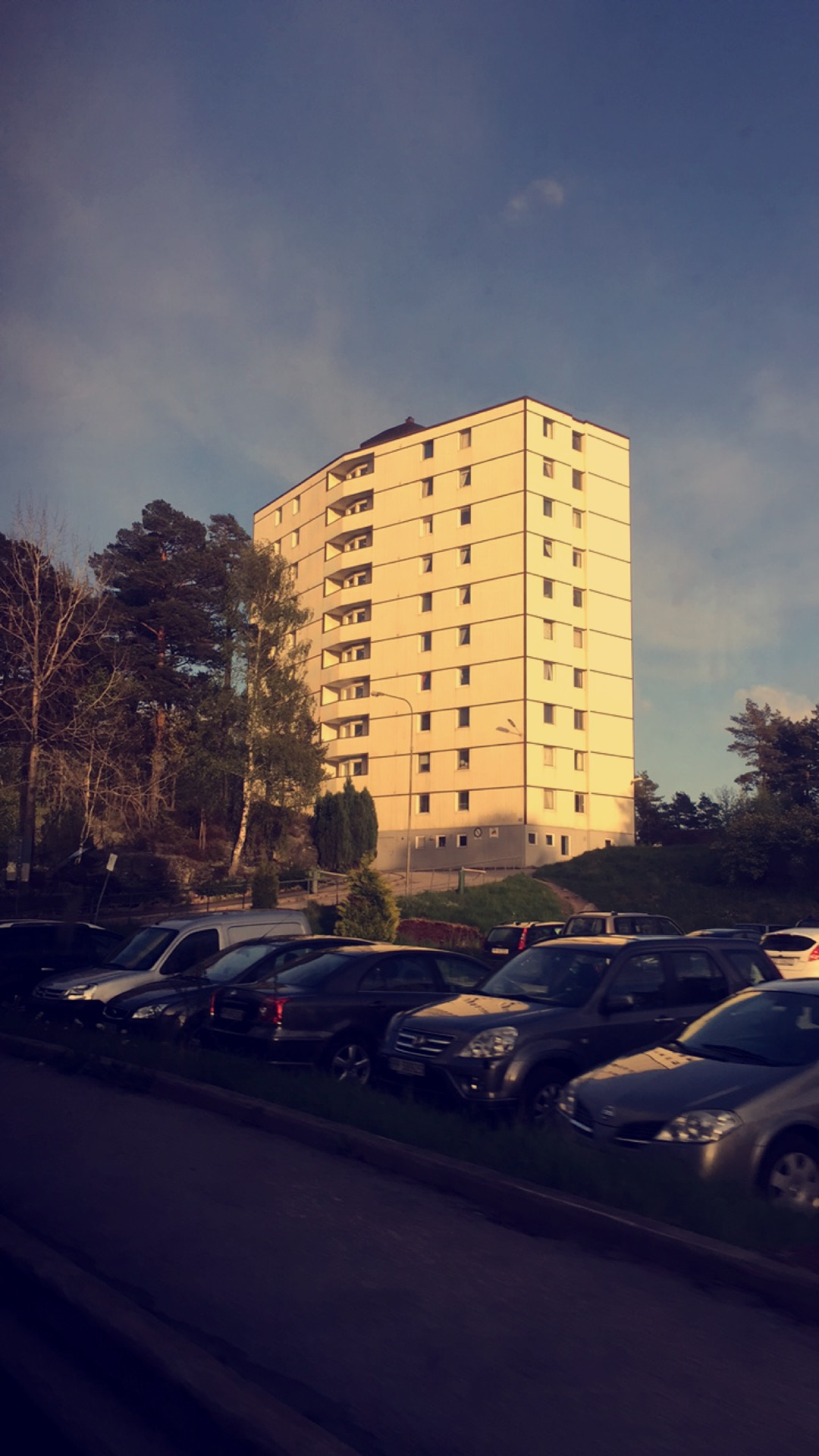
Most apartments on Slettheia looks like this

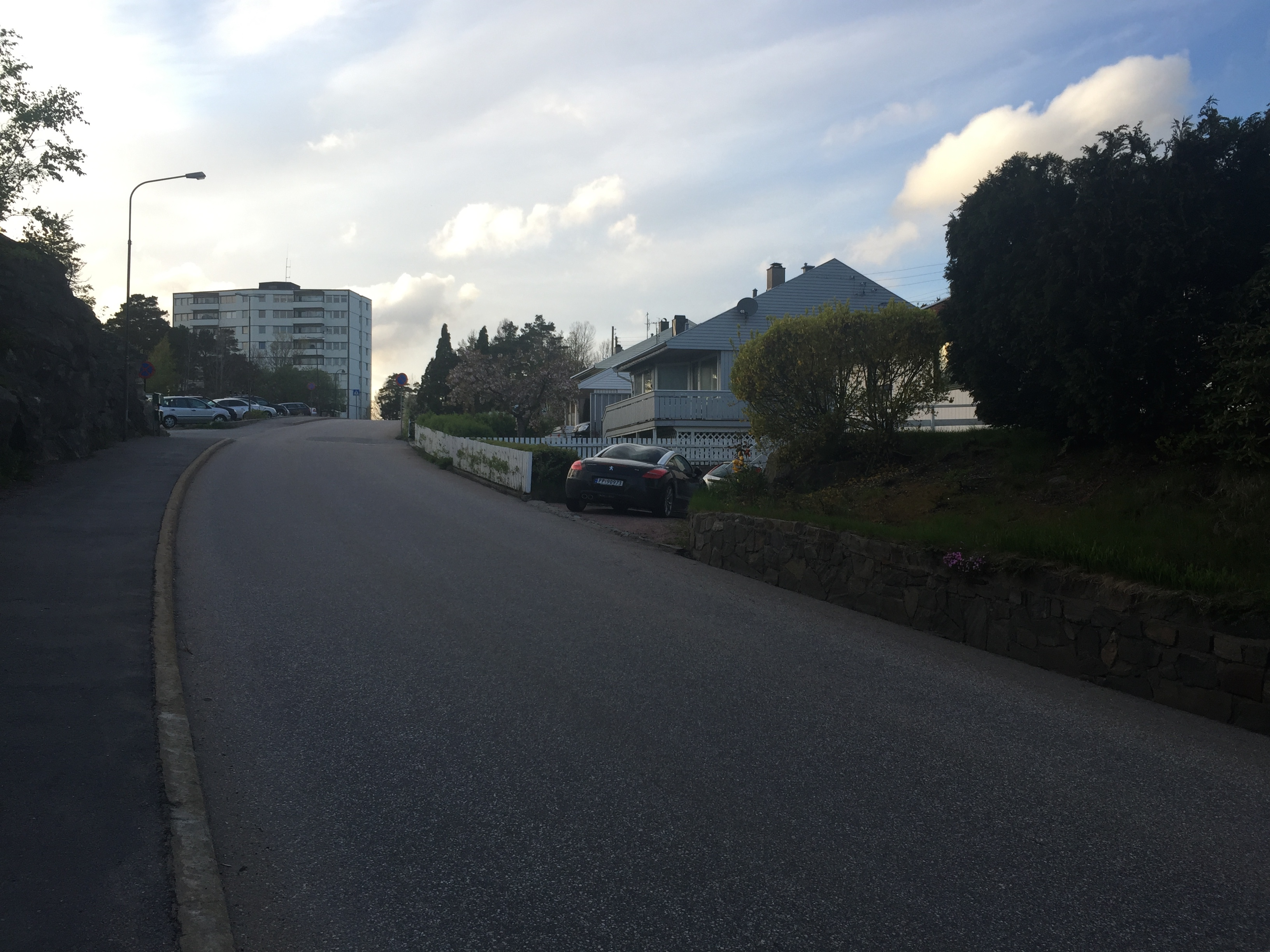
Øvre Slettheia

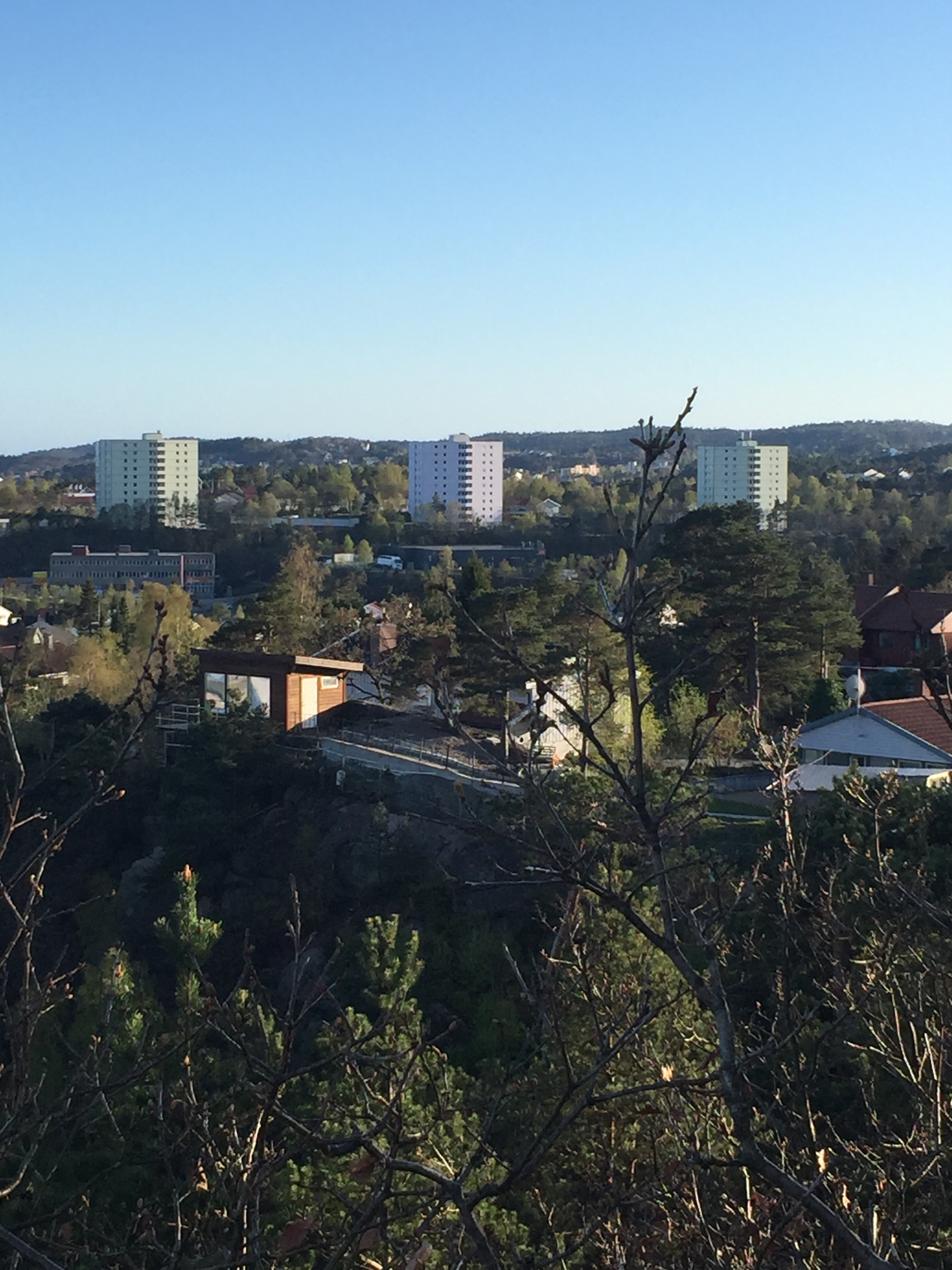
Slettheia from Tinnheia

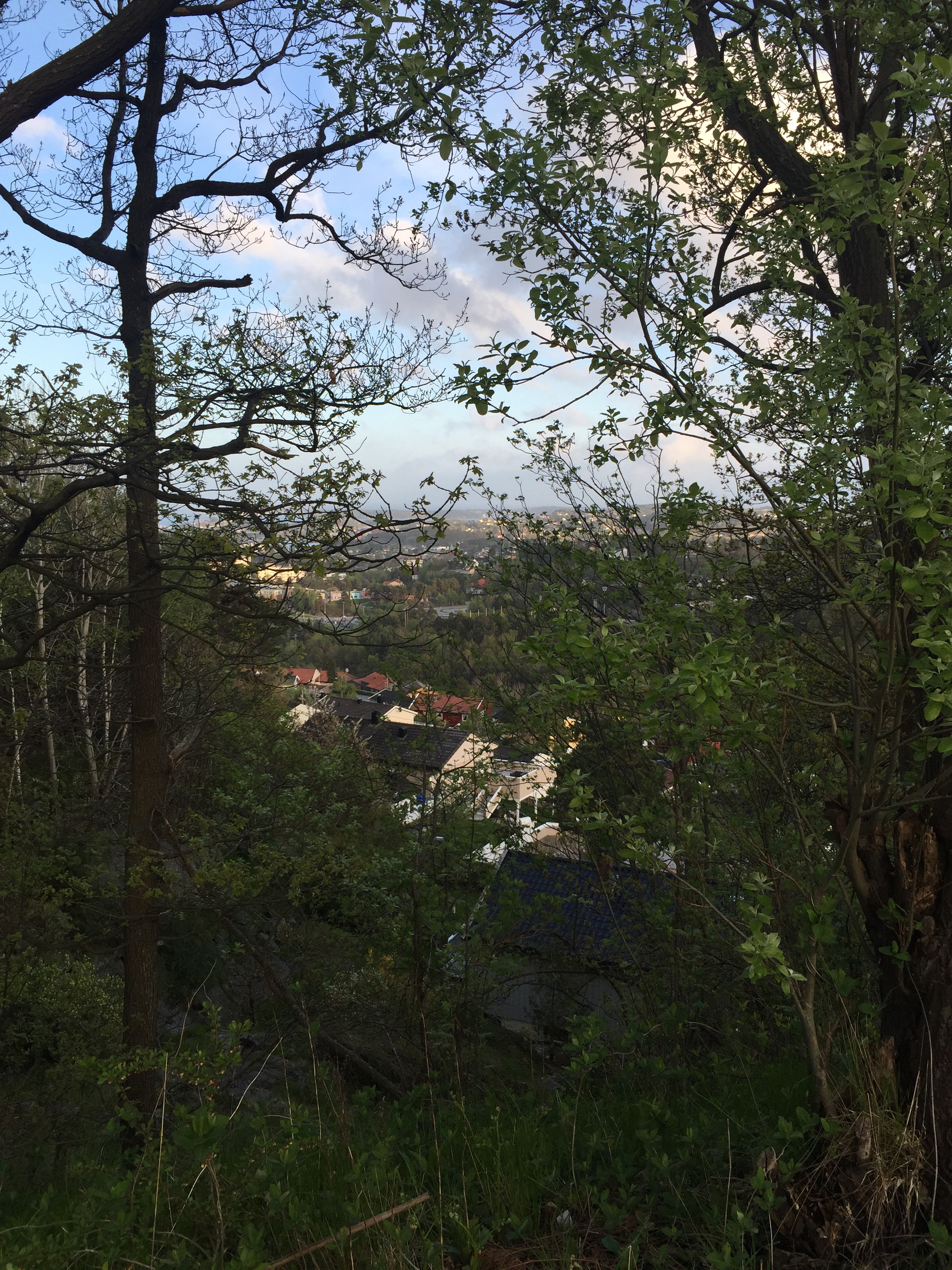
View of Vågsbygd from Slettheia

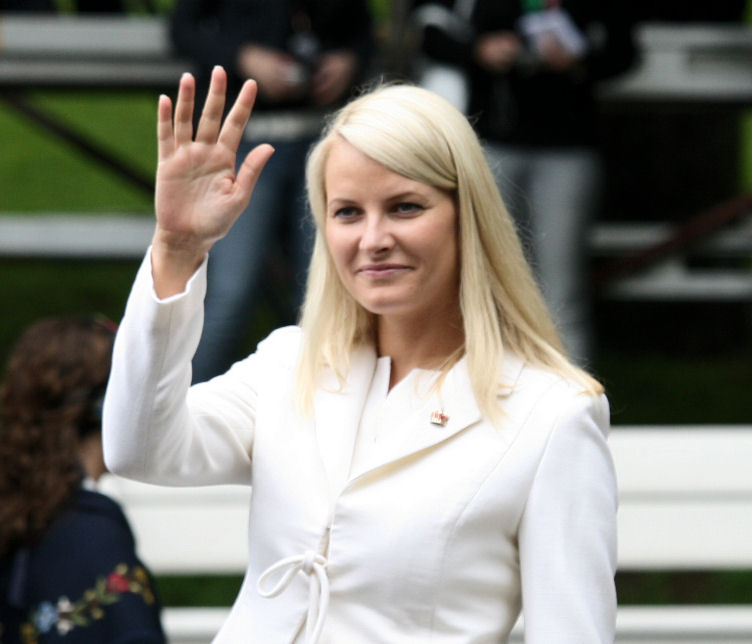
Mette-Marit, Crown Princess of Norway is from Slettheia
