= Auglandslia =

- Neighborhood
- Interactive map of Auglandslia
- Coordinates: 58.1182°N 07.9551°E
- Country: Norway
- County: Agder
- Municipality: Kristiansand
- Borough: Vågsbygd
- District: Vågsbygd
- Elevation: 24 m (79 ft)
- Time zone: UTC+01:00 (CET)
  - Summer (DST): UTC+02:00 (CEST)
- Postal code: 4620
- Area code: 38

Auglandslia is a neighbourhood in the city of Kristiansand in Agder county, Norway. The neighborhood is located in the borough of Vågsbygd and in the district of Vågsbygd. It is located north of Augland, west of Skyllingsheia, and south of Granlia and Fiskåtangen.

Bus lines from Auglandslia
Line	Destination
12	Kjos Haveby - Eg - Sykehuset
