= Hasselbakken =

- Neighborhood in Kristiansand
- Interactive map of Hasselbakken
- Coordinates: 58.1262°N 07.9420°E
- Country: Norway
- County: Agder
- Municipality: Kristiansand
- Borough: Vågsbygd
- District: Vågsbygd
- Elevation: 65 m (213 ft)
- Time zone: UTC+01:00 (CET)
  - Summer (DST): UTC+02:00 (CEST)
- Postal Code: 4620
- Area code: 38

Hasselbakken is a neighbourhood in the city of Kristiansand in Agder county, Norway. It is located in the borough of Vågsbygd and in the district of Vågsbygd. Hasselbakken is north of Bjørklia, south of Nordtjønnåsen, and west of Åsane.

== Transportation ==
Bus lines through Hasselbakken:

Line	Destinations
12	Kjos Haveby - Eg - Sykehuset
