= Auglandskollen =

- Neighborhood
- Interactive map of Auglandskollen
- Coordinates: 58.1196°N 07.9543°E
- Country: Norway
- County: Agder
- Municipality: Kristiansand
- Borough: Vågsbygd
- District: Vågsbygd
- Elevation: 31 m (102 ft)
- Time zone: UTC+01:00 (CET)
  - Summer (DST): UTC+02:00 (CEST)
- Postal code: 4620
- Area code: 38

Auglandskollen is a neighbourhood in the city of Kristiansand in Agder county, Norway. The neighborhood is located in the borough of Vågsbygd and in the district of Vågsbygd. Auglandskollen is north of Kjosneset, south of Augland, east of Kjos Haveby, and west of Auglandsbukta.

== Transport ==
Roads through Auglandskollen
| Line | Destination |
|---|---|
| Norwegian County Road 456 | Søgne - Hannevika |

Buses stopping at Auglandskollen
| Line | Destination |
|---|---|
| 12 | Kjos Haveby - Eg - Sykehuset |
