= Augland =

- Neighborhood
- Interactive map of Augland
- Coordinates: 58.1216°N 07.9540°E
- Country: Norway
- County: Agder
- Municipality: Kristiansand
- Borough: Vågsbygd
- District: Vågsbygd
- Elevation: 5 m (16 ft)
- Time zone: UTC+01:00 (CET)
  - Summer (DST): UTC+02:00 (CEST)
- Postal code: 4620
- Area code: 38

Augland is a neighbourhood in the city of Kristiansand in Agder county, Norway. The neighborhood is located in the borough of Vågsbygd and in the district of Vågsbygd. Augland is north of Auglandsbukta, south of Auglandslia, east of Auglandskollen, and west of Skyllingsheia. Vågsbygd Church is located in the neighborhood.

== Transport ==
Roads through Augland
Line	Destination
Norwegian County Road 456	Søgne - Hannevika

Buses serving Augland
Line	Destination
M1	Flekkerøy - Sørlandsparken Dyreparken - IKEA
M2	Voiebyen - Hånes
05	Andøya - Vågsbygd sentrum
09	Bråvann - Vågsbygd sentrum
12	Kjos Haveby - Eg - Sykehuset
50	Kristiansand - Søgne
