= Kjosneset =

- Neighborhood in Kristiansand
- Interactive map of Kjosneset
- Coordinates: 58.11383°N 7.95181°E
- Country: Norway
- County: Agder
- Municipality: Kristiansand
- Borough: Vågsbygd
- District: Vågsbygd
- Time zone: UTC+01:00 (CET)
  - Summer (DST): UTC+02:00 (CEST)
- Postal code: 4620
- Area code: 38

Kjosneset is a neighbourhood in the city of Kristiansand in Agder county, Norway. It is located in the borough of Vågsbygd and in the district of Vågsbygd. Kjosneset is north of Smiebrygga, south of Auglandskollen, east of Kjos Haveby and west of Storenes.

== Transportation ==
Bus lines from Kjosneset
Line	Destination
12	Kjos Haveby - Eg - Sykehuset
