= Åsane (Kristiansand) =

- Neighborhood
- Interactive map of Åsane
- Coordinates: 58.1197°N 07.9478°E
- Country: Norway
- County: Agder
- Municipality: Kristiansand
- Borough: Vågsbygd
- District: Vågsbygd
- Elevation: 34 m (112 ft)
- Time zone: UTC+01:00 (CET)
  - Summer (DST): UTC+02:00 (CEST)
- Postal code: 4620
- Area code: 38

Åsane is a neighbourhood in the city of Kristiansand in Agder county, Norway. The neighborhood is located in the borough of Vågsbygd and in the district of Vågsbygd. The Åsane Elementary School serves the neighborhood. Åsane is north of Bråvann, south of Nordtjønnåsen, and west of Bjørklia.

== Transportation ==
Bus lines through Åsane
Line	Destinations
12	Kjos Haveby - Eg - Sykehuset
