= Granlia =

- Neighborhood in Kristiansand
- Interactive map of Granlia
- Coordinates: 58.1251°N 07.9446°E
- Country: Norway
- County: Agder
- Municipality: Kristiansand
- Borough: Vågsbygd
- District: Vågsbygd
- Elevation: 48 m (157 ft)
- Time zone: UTC+01:00 (CET)
  - Summer (DST): UTC+02:00 (CEST)
- Postal code: 4620
- Area code: 38

Granlia is a neighbourhood in the city of Kristiansand in Agder county, Norway. The neighborhood is located in the borough of Vågsbygd and in the district of Vågsbygd. Granlia is north of Vågsbygd sentrum, south of Karuss, west of Kjerrheia, and east of Nordtjønnåsen.

== Transportation ==
Bus lines serving Granlia
| Line | Destinations |
|---|---|
| 12 | Kjos Haveby - Eg - Sykehuset |
