= Arendal (disambiguation) =

Arendal may refer to:

== Places ==
- Arendal (town), a town/city located within Arendal Municipality in Agder county, Norway
- Arendal Municipality, a municipality in Agder county, Norway
- Arendal prosti, a Church of Norway deanery based in Arendal Municipality in Agder county, Norway

== Transportation ==
- Arendal Airport, Gullknapp, a regional airport in Arendal Municipality in Agder county, Norway
- Arendal Line, a railway line terminating in Arendal Municipality in Agder county, Norway
- Arendal station, a railway station in Arendal Municipality in Agder county, Norway
- Arendal Heliport, Hospital, a heliport in Arendal Municipality in Agder county, Norway

== Sport ==
- Arendal Fotball, a football club based in Arendal Municipality in Agder county, Norway
- ØIF Arendal, a handball club based in Arendal Municipality in Agder county, Norway
- FK Arendal, a former football club based in Arendal Municipality in Agder county, Norway
