= Farsund =

Farsund may refer to:

== Places ==
- Farsund Municipality, a municipality in Agder county, Norway
- Farsund (town), a town within Farsund Municipality in Agder county, Norway

== Other ==
- Farsund Airport, Lista, an airport in Agder county, Norway
- Farsund IL, a sports club based in Farsund Municipality in Agder county, Norway
- Farsund Hospital, a defunct hospital in the town of Farsund, Norway
