= Arendal Heliport, Hospital =

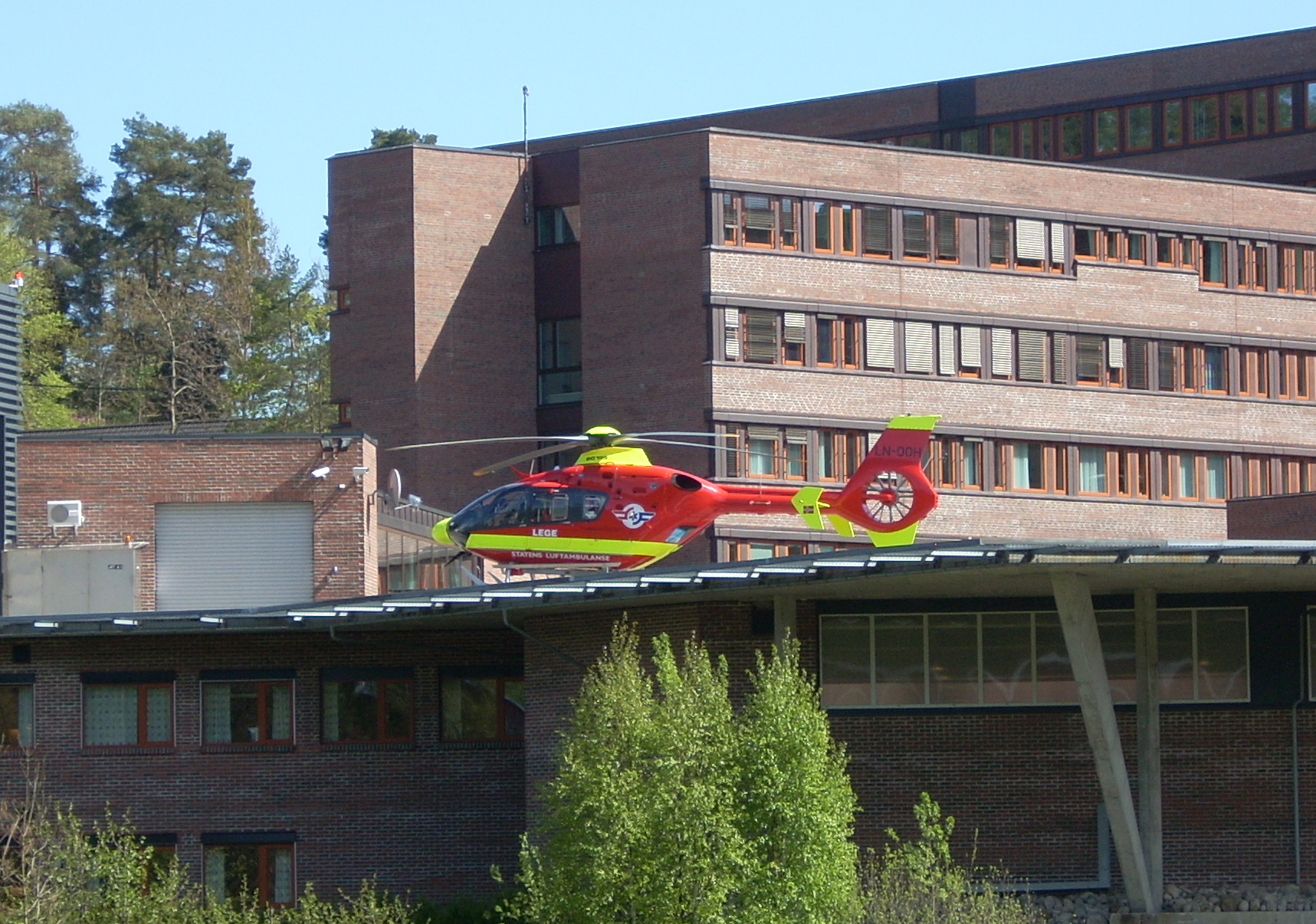
- IATA: none; ICAO: ENAR

Summary
- Airport type: Private (Air medical services)
- Owner: Sørlandet Hospital Trust
- Operator: Norsk Luftambulanse
- Serves: Arendal, Norway
- Location: Sørlandet Hospital Arendal, Heimdal, Arendal
- Coordinates: 58.46650°N 8.75413°E

Map
- Location within Norway

Helipads
Number	Length		Surface
Number	m	ft	Surface
	23	75	Asphalt

Arendal Heliport, Hospital (ICAO: ENAR; Norwegian: Arendal helikopterplass, Sykehuset) is a heliport situated on the premises of Arendal Hospital in the Heimdal neighborhood of Arendal, Norway. Used exclusively for air ambulance services, it is home to a Eurocopter EC-135P2+ operated by Norsk Luftambulanse (NLA) on contract with the National Air Ambulance Service. The base is owned by Sørlandet Hospital Trust.

NLA started operating a summer base in Moland Municipality outside Arendal in 1986. Local actions to receive a permanent base started in 1990, and the heliport opened the following year.

== History ==
Norsk Luftambulanse carried out a trial operation in Arendal during the summer of 1986. The south coast filled with holiday-goers during the summer months, increasing the demand for medical treatment. NLA was at the time funded through donations and needed to find new ways to promote itself. They found a suitable natural helipad at the former director mansion of Arendal Smelteverk, situated on the island of Buøya in the then municipality of Moland. NLA lacked sufficient funding for the project, so they made an agreement where the employees could bring themselves and their families for a free vacation at the mansion in exchange for duty time. NLA continued to operate a summer base in Arendal every summer.

A government commission looked into the air ambulance organization in 1982. This resulted in the National Air Ambulance Service being established in 1988, under the auspice of the National Insurance Service. Through this arrangement, Agder and Telemark were covered by helicopter ambulances based at Lørenskog Heliport, Central Hospital and Stavanger Heliport, Central Hospital.

The government decision spurred local campaigning to establish a permanent base in Agder. They argued that Stavanger and Oslo were too far away to give an adequate coverage of Agder and Telemark. The activism increased rapidly in 1990. Two petitions were established, the one gathering 33,000 signatures. A common petition was written and signed by both county councils, 34 mayors and various organizations. There was also some opposition, based on that the ambulance service would in total be better off if the extra funding was used on strengthening the conventional ambulance service.

Although there was agreement that a base should be established, there was far from local consensus regarding its location. Vest-Agder County Municipality argued that the base should be situated at Vest-Agder Central Hospital in Kristiansand, while Aust-Agder County Municipality wanted it at Aust-Agder Central Hospital in Arendal. The issue was decided by the Ministry of Social Affairs. The main argument was the Arendal was about of equal distance between Stavanger and Lørenskog and that a helicopter there could cover both Vest-Agder and Telemark, unlike one based in Kristiansand.

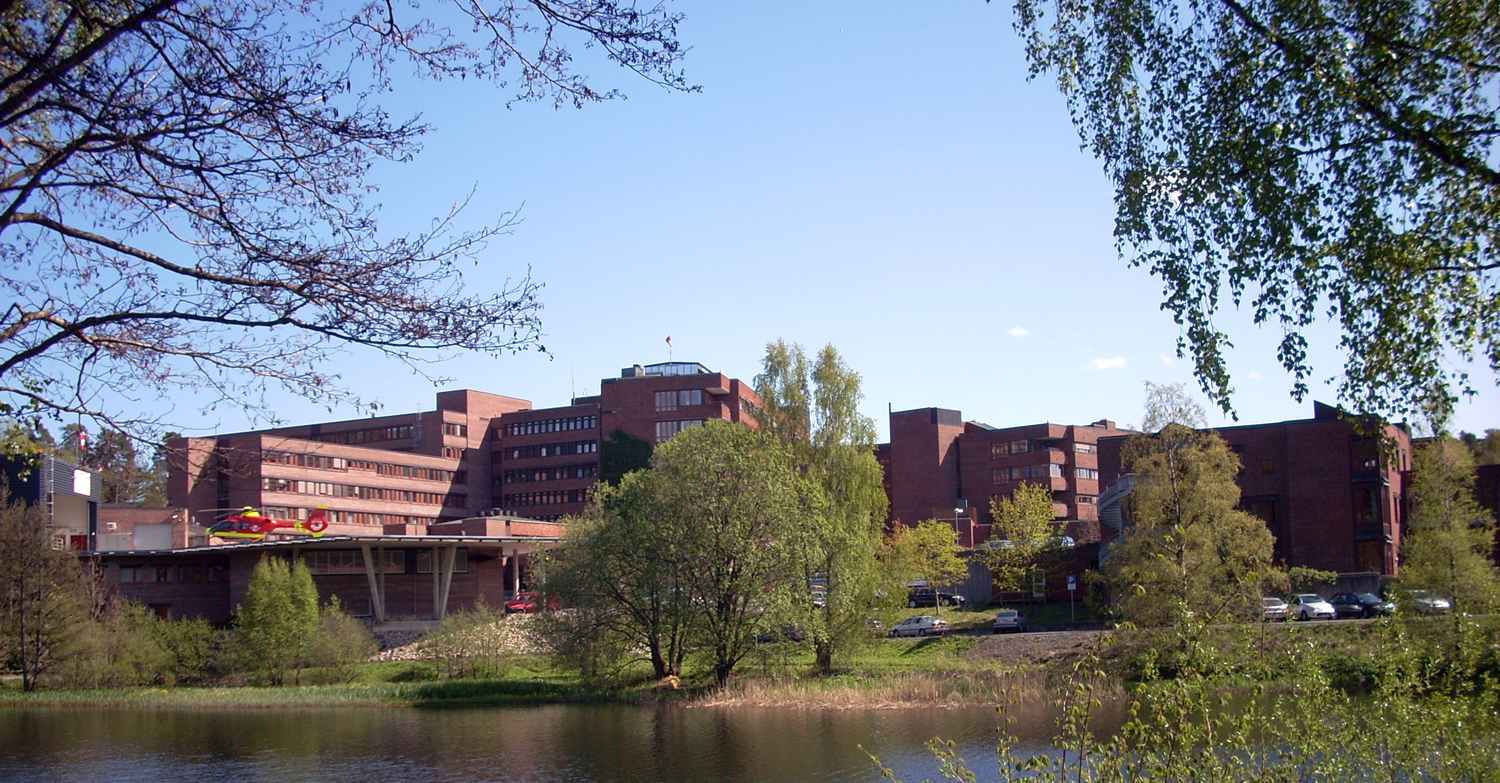
Arendal Hospital and its heliport

Parliament approved the heliport, allowing it to start operations in 1991. This was met by protests from neighbors of the hospital, who complained about the noise pollution. They demanded the relocation of the heliport. This was the most extensive conflict of any regarding the location of an ambulance heliport in the country. After several years of measuring and other considerations, about fifty home-owners received compensation. Arendal was one of three heliports opened between 1991 and 1994, bringing the total number of ambulance helicopter bases to eleven.

The original tender to operate the helicopter was awarded to NLA. The contract was from 2001 won by Airlift. NLA reclaimed the operating rights in the 2006 tender.

== Facilities ==
The heliport is located centrally within the facilities of Arendal Hospital, located in the Heimdal neighborhood of Arendal. The base consists of an integrated office and hangar situated next to the helipad. It measures 23 meters (75 ft) in diameter and can carry 10 tonnes. The heliport has direct access to the emergency department, 40 meters (130 ft) away, through a skywalk. The facility is owned by Sørlandet Hospital Trust, part of Southern and Eastern Norway Regional Health Authority.

== Operations ==
The ambulance helicopters are operated by Norsk Luftambulanse on contract with the National Air Ambulance Service. They have a Eurocopter EC-135P2+ stationed at the heliport. It has room for a crew of three, consisting of a pilot, rescue swimming and an anesthesiologist, as well as two stretchers. Medical staff are provided by Arendal Hospital. The helicopter flew 916 missions lasting 845 hours in 2013.

The heliport is occasionally used by the Westland Sea King of the 330 Squadron and the police helicopter. The 300 Squadron had one average annual landing in the period from 2005 to 2011.

== Bibliography ==
- Andersen, Rune (2007). Når det haster (in Norwegian). Oslo: Orion Forlag. ISBN 978-82-458-0838-4.
- Ministry of Health, Social Affairs (1998). Luftambulansetjenesten i Norge (PDF) (in Norwegian). Vol. 8.
