= Skyllingsheia =

- Neighborhood in Kristiansand
- Interactive map of Skyllingsheia
- Coordinates: 58.1226°N 07.9618°E
- Country: Norway
- County: Agder
- Municipality: Kristiansand
- Borough: Vågsbygd
- District: Vågsbygd
- Elevation: 32 m (105 ft)
- Time zone: UTC+01:00 (CET)
  - Summer (DST): UTC+02:00 (CEST)
- Postal code: 4621
- Area code: 38

Skyllingsheia is a neighbourhood in the city of Kristiansand in Agder county, Norway. It is located in the borough of Vågsbygd and in the district of Vågsbygd. Skyllingsheia is north of the neighborhood of Auglandsbukta, south of Lumber, and east of central Vågsbygd.

== Transport ==
Roads through Skyllingsheia
Line	Destination
Norwegian County Road 456	Søgne - Hannevika

Bus routes through Skyllingsheia
Line	Destination
12	Kjos Haveby - Eg - Sykehuset
