= Smiebrygga =

- Neighborhood in Kristiansand
- Interactive map of Smiebrygga
- Coordinates: 58°06′59″N 07°57′38″E
- Country: Norway
- County: Agder
- Municipality: Kristiansand
- Borough: Vågsbygd
- District: Vågsbygd
- Time zone: UTC+01:00 (CET)
  - Summer (DST): UTC+02:00 (CEST)
- Postal code: 4622
- Area code: 38

Smiebrygga is a neighbourhood in the city of Kristiansand in Agder county, Norway. It is located in the borough of Vågsbygd and in the district of Vågsbygd. Smiebrygga is north of Kjosbukta, south of Auglandskollen, east of Kjosneset, and west of the ocean.

== Transportation ==
Roads through Smiebrygga
Road	Stretch
Fv456	Hannevika - Søgne

Bus lines through Smiebrygga
Line	Destinations
M1	Flekkerøy - Sørlandsparken Dyreparken - IKEA
M1	Flekkerøy - Kvadraturen
M2	Voiebyen - Hånes
M2	Voiebyen - Hånes - Lauvåsen
M2	Voiebyen - Hånes / Kjevik - Tveit
M2	Voiebyen - Kvadraturen
05	Andøya - Vågsbygd sentrum
05	Andøya - Kvadraturen - UiA
09	Bråvann - Vågsbygd sentrum
09	Bråvann - Kvadraturen - UiA
50	Søgne - Kristiansand
D2	Voiebyen - Kvadraturen - UiA
