= Sørlandet Hospital Flekkefjord =

Hospital in Flekkefjord, Norway

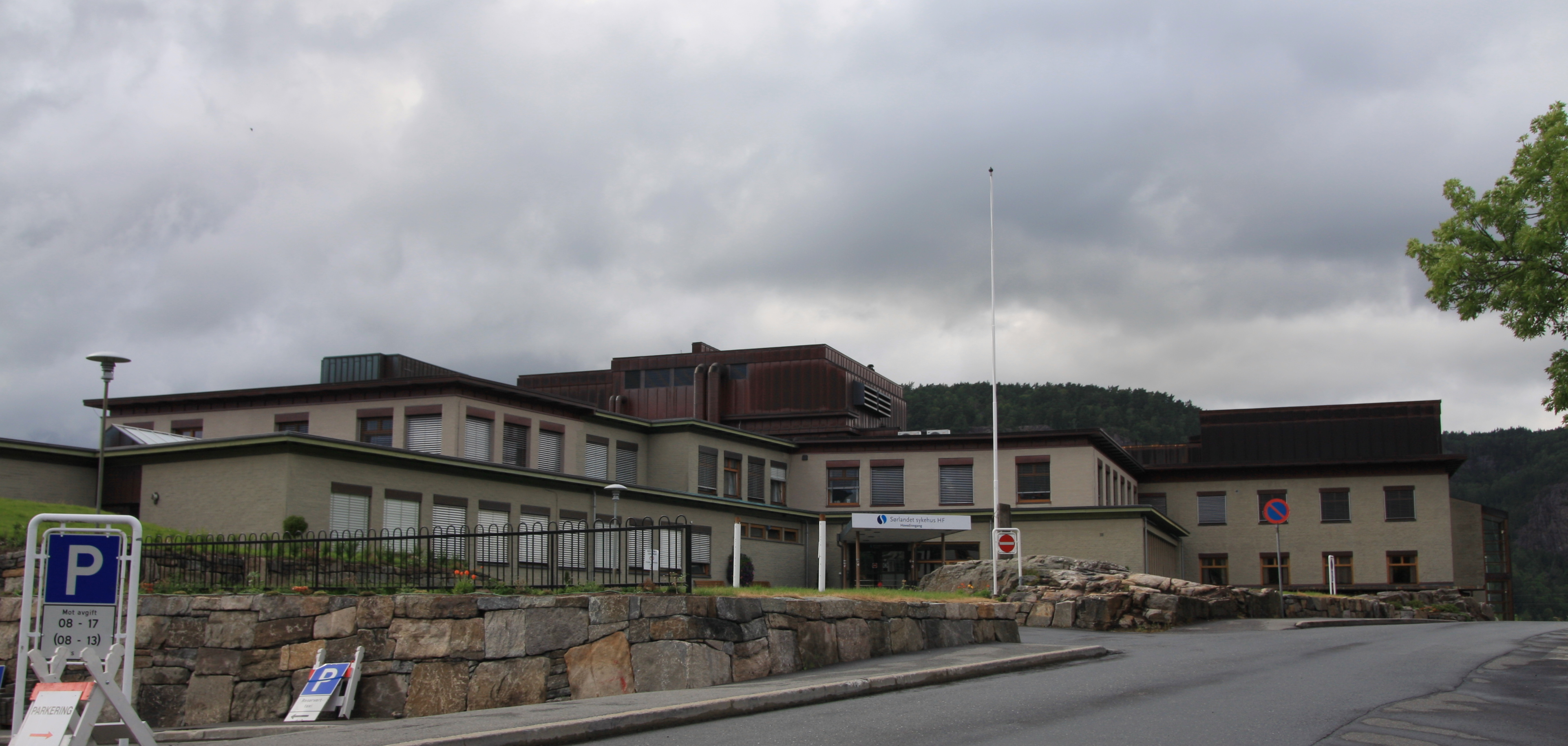

Geography
- Location: Flekkefjord, Flekkefjord Municipality, Agder, Norway
- Coordinates: 58.29852°N 6.66575°E

Organisation
- Care system: Southern and Eastern Norway Regional Health Authority
- Type: Hospital
- Network: Hospital of Southern Norway

Sørlandet Hospital Flekkefjord is a hospital located in the town of Flekkefjord which is located in Flekkefjord Municipality in the western part of Agder county, Norway. It is one of the three main hospitals covering southern Norway.

The hospital is one branch within the Hospital of Southern Norway which is owned by the Southern and Eastern Norway Regional Health Authority.

The hospital has its own natal department, and a department for emergency surgical and medical procedures. The hospital has its own ambulance station. There is also a psychiatric department for day time treatment at the Regional Psychiatric Centre (DPS) Lister, and separate department for child- and adolescent psychiatry.
