= Vågsbygd Church =

Church in Agder, Norway

- Vågsbygd kirke
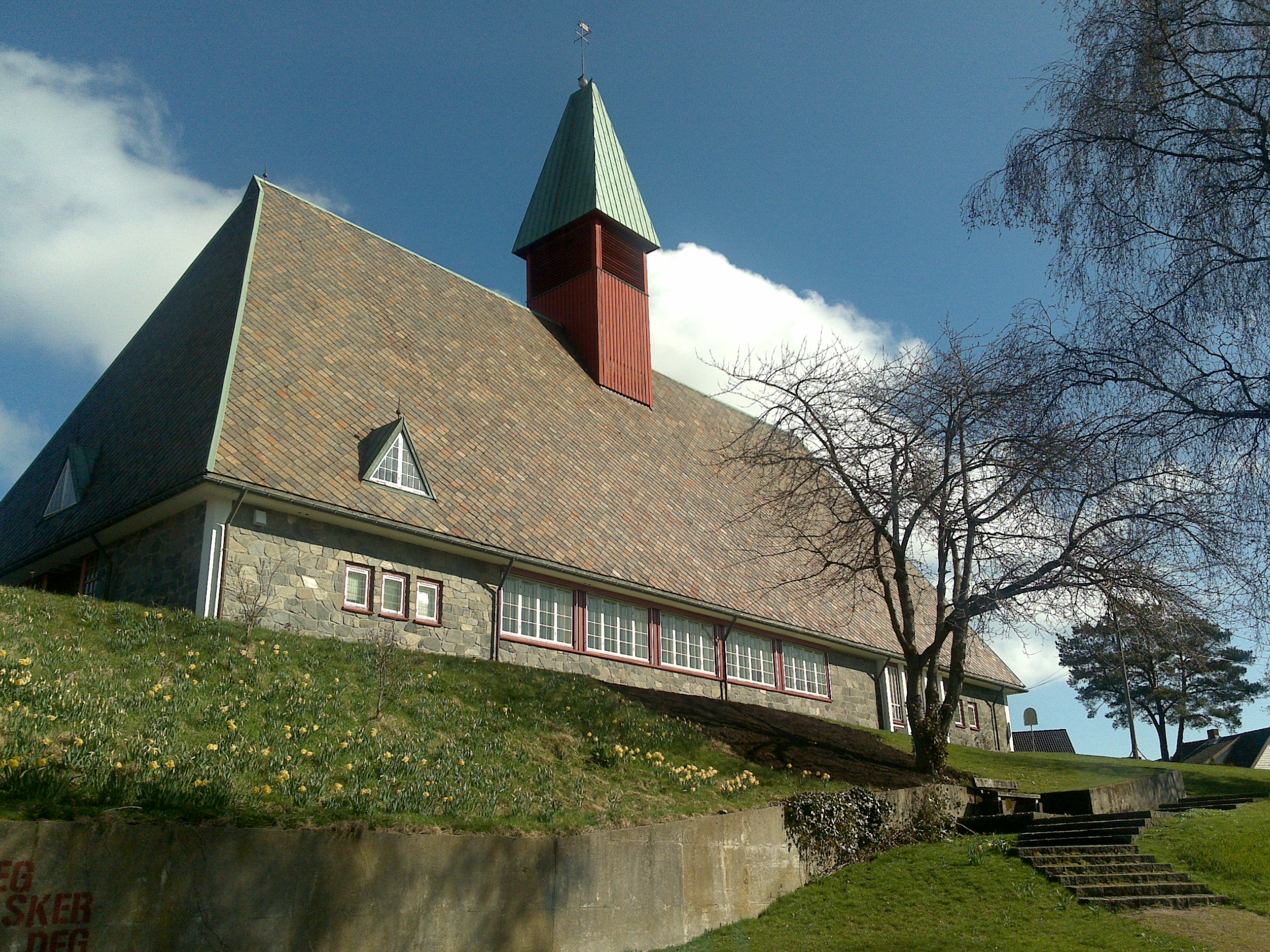
- View of the church
- Vågsbygd Church
- 58.1220°N 07.9558°E
- Location: Kristiansand Municipality, Agder
- Country: Norway
- Denomination: Church of Norway
- Churchmanship: Evangelical Lutheran

History
- Status: Parish church
- Founded: 1967
- Consecrated: 1967

Architecture
- Functional status: Active
- Architect: Christen A. Christensen
- Architectural type: Rectangular
- Completed: 1967 (59 years ago)

Specifications
- Capacity: 450
- Materials: Stone

Administration
- Diocese: Agder og Telemark
- Deanery: Kristiansand domprosti
- Parish: Vågsbygd
- Norwegian Cultural Heritage Site
- Type: Church
- Status: Not protected
- ID: 85879

Vågsbygd Church (Norwegian: Vågsbygd kirke) is a parish church of the Church of Norway in Kristiansand Municipality in Agder county, Norway. It is located in the Augland neighborhood in the borough of Vågsbygd in the city of Kristiansand. It is the church for the Vågsbygd parish which is part of the Kristiansand domprosti (arch-deanery) in the Diocese of Agder og Telemark. The gray, stone church was built in a rectangular design in 1967 using plans drawn up by the architect Christen A. Christensen. The church seats about 450 people.

== Media gallery ==
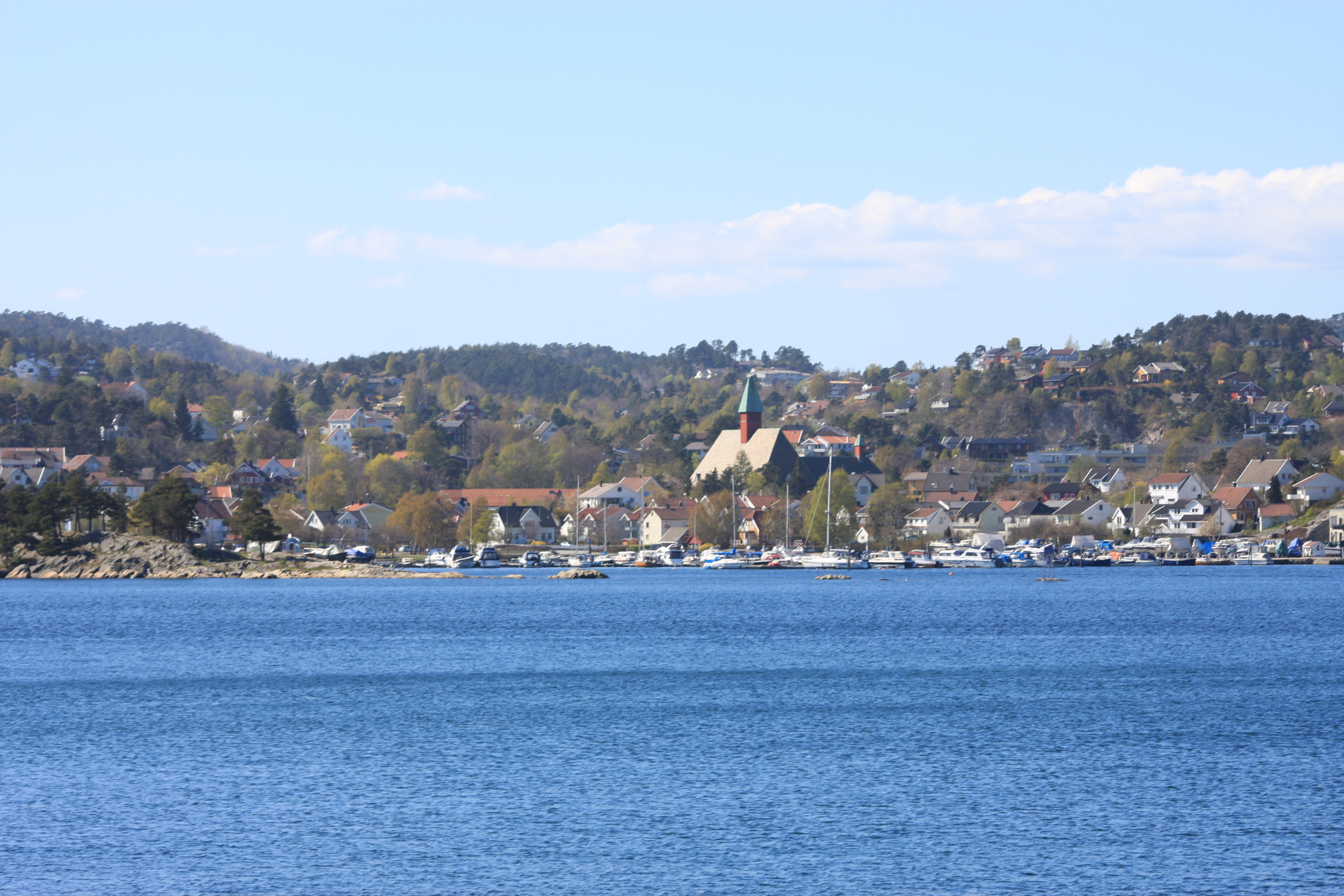

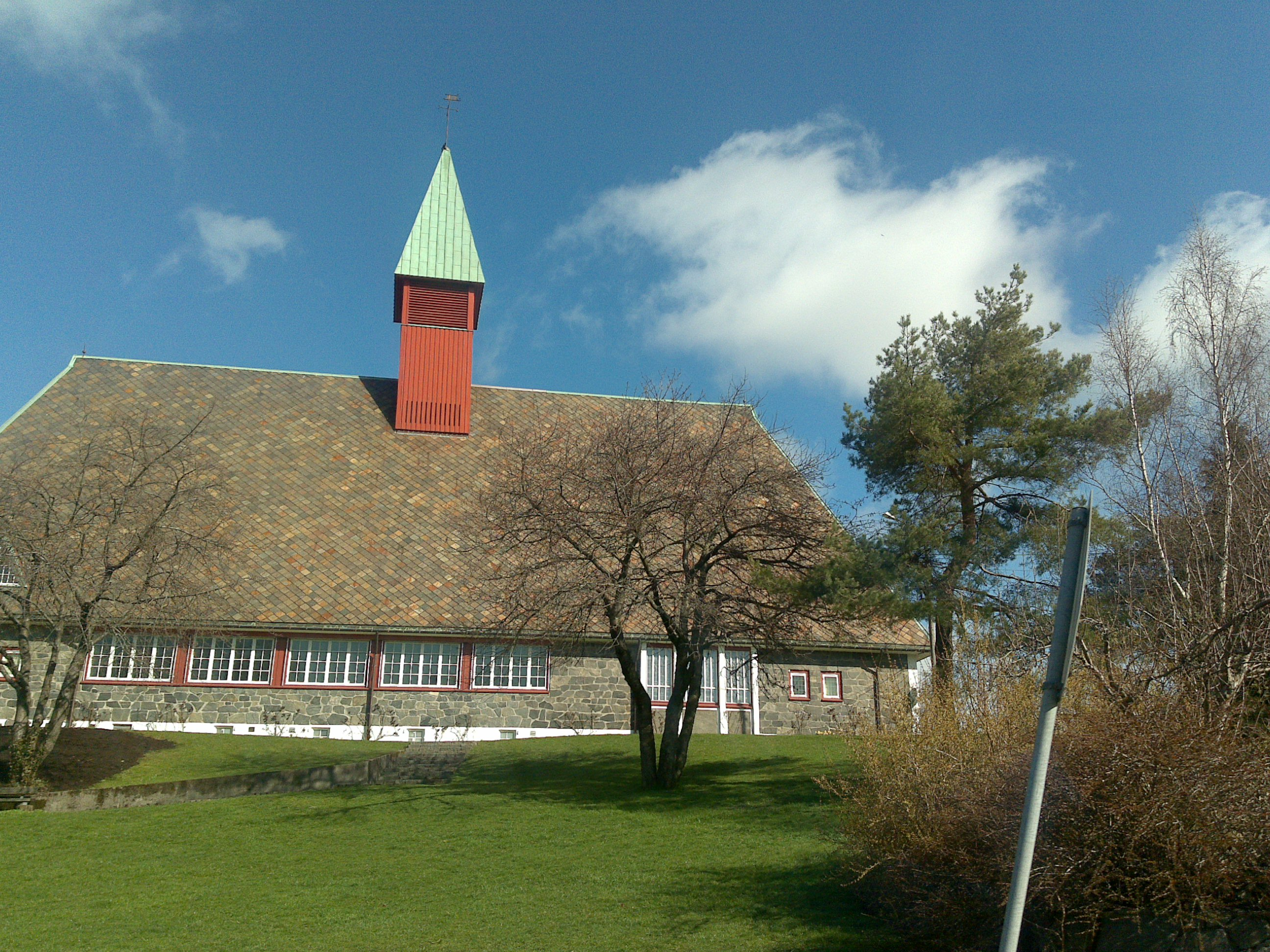

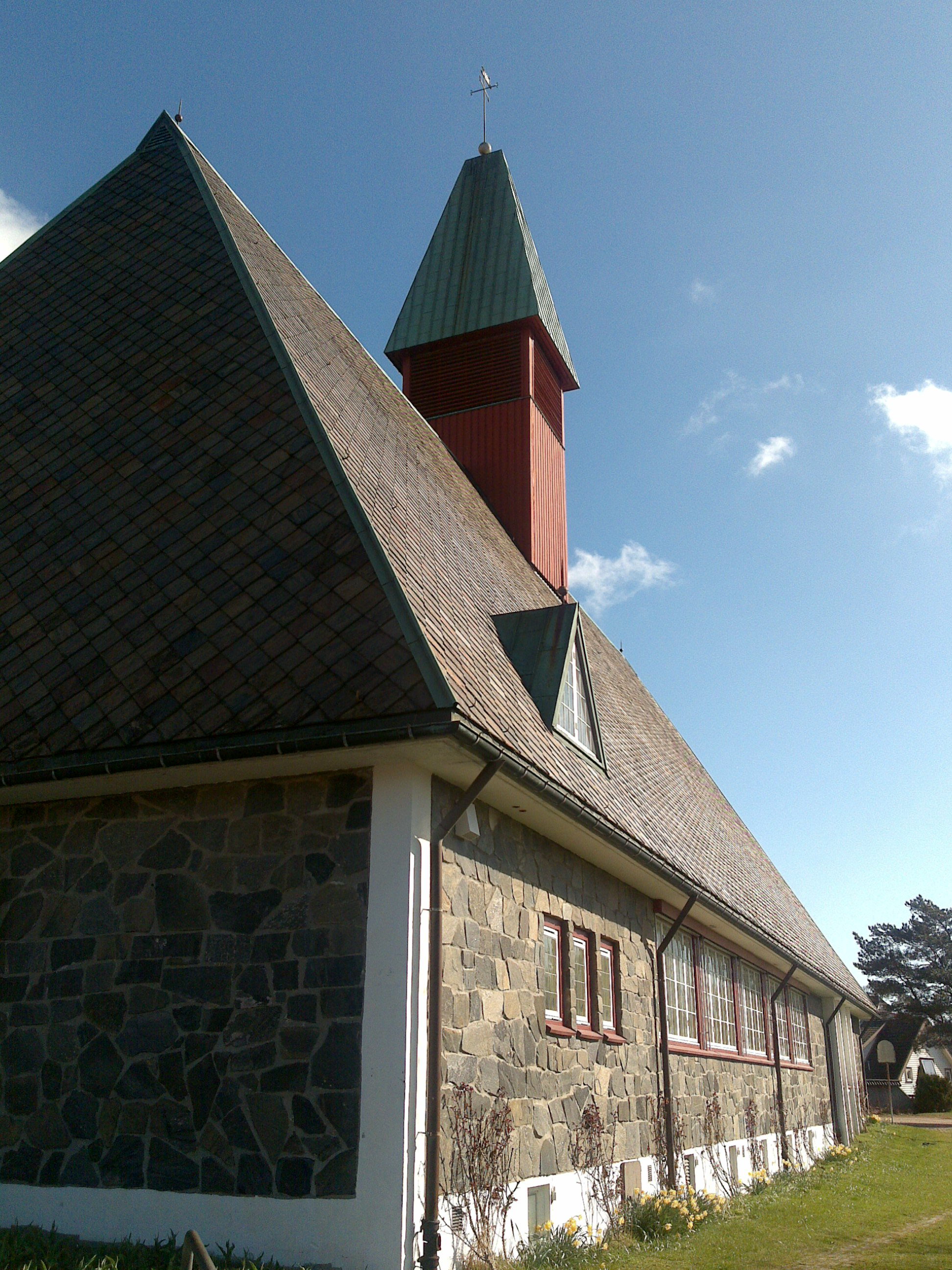

== See also ==
- List of churches in Agder og Telemark
