= Auglandsbukta =

- Neighborhood
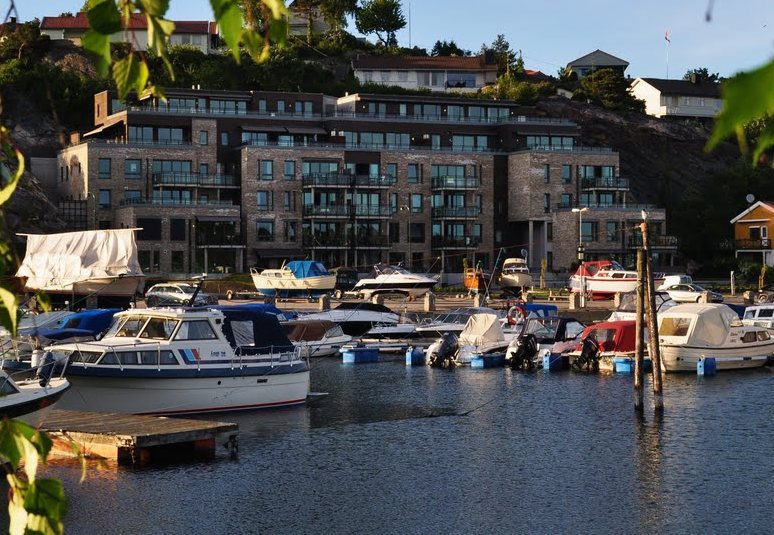
- View of the neighborhood
- Interactive map of Auglandsbukta
- Coordinates: 58.1198°N 07.9652°E
- Country: Norway
- County: Agder
- Municipality: Kristiansand
- Borough: Vågsbygd
- District: Vågsbygd
- Elevation: 0 m (0 ft)
- Time zone: UTC+01:00 (CET)
  - Summer (DST): UTC+02:00 (CEST)
- Postal code: 4621
- Area code: 38

Auglandsbukta is a neighbourhood in the city of Kristiansand in Agder county, Norway. The neighborhood is located in the borough of Vågsbygd and in the district of Vågsbygd. There is a large marina harbour and park located in the cove of Auglandsbukta. Auglandsbukta is next to Norwegian County Road 456. Augland lies to the west and Skyllingsheia lies to the north.
