= Farsund Hospital =

Former hospital in Norway

Farsund Hospital (58°05′27″N 6°48′12″E) was a local hospital situated close to the town centre of Farsund in Farsund Municipality, Vest-Agder county, Norway. It closed in 2007 and the municipality bought the property in December 2008. It has been disused since.

Built in 1937 on 1.1 hectares (2.7 acres) on a hill overlooking the town, the hospital opened in September 1938 and has over 4,000 square metres (43,000 sq ft) of floor space on four levels. It was operated by the municipality until the health care reform of 2003, when it came under the regional Sørlandet sykehus HF system.

The hospital had a fine reputation for osteopathic medicine, according to Svein Mathisen, who had an ankle operation there in December 1983.

The maternity ward closed in 1993 and the surgical department in 1996. In 1998 there were 70 employees. On 30 June 2005 the polyclinic, radiology, and laboratory departments closed, and the hospital stopped operating 24 hours a day. Many employees were transferred to other hospitals. In 2005 there were 55 employees. The hospital closed in October 2007 when the paediatric and youth psychiatry department moved out. The municipality of Farsund had the right of first refusal on the hospital under a 1955 agreement; on 15 December 2008 they bought it from Sørlandet sykehus, planning to use it to offer private health services such as radiography. The old X-ray equipment was donated to a hospital in Zimbabwe.

In late 2012 the municipality decided to sell the building, but it must first be rezoned so that it can be used for purposes other than health care. In May 2013 the municipality published planning documents under which the site is to be used for high-density housing.
