= Sørlandet Hospital Kristiansand =

Hospital in Kristiansand, Norway

Coordinates: 58°09′51″N 007°58′51″E

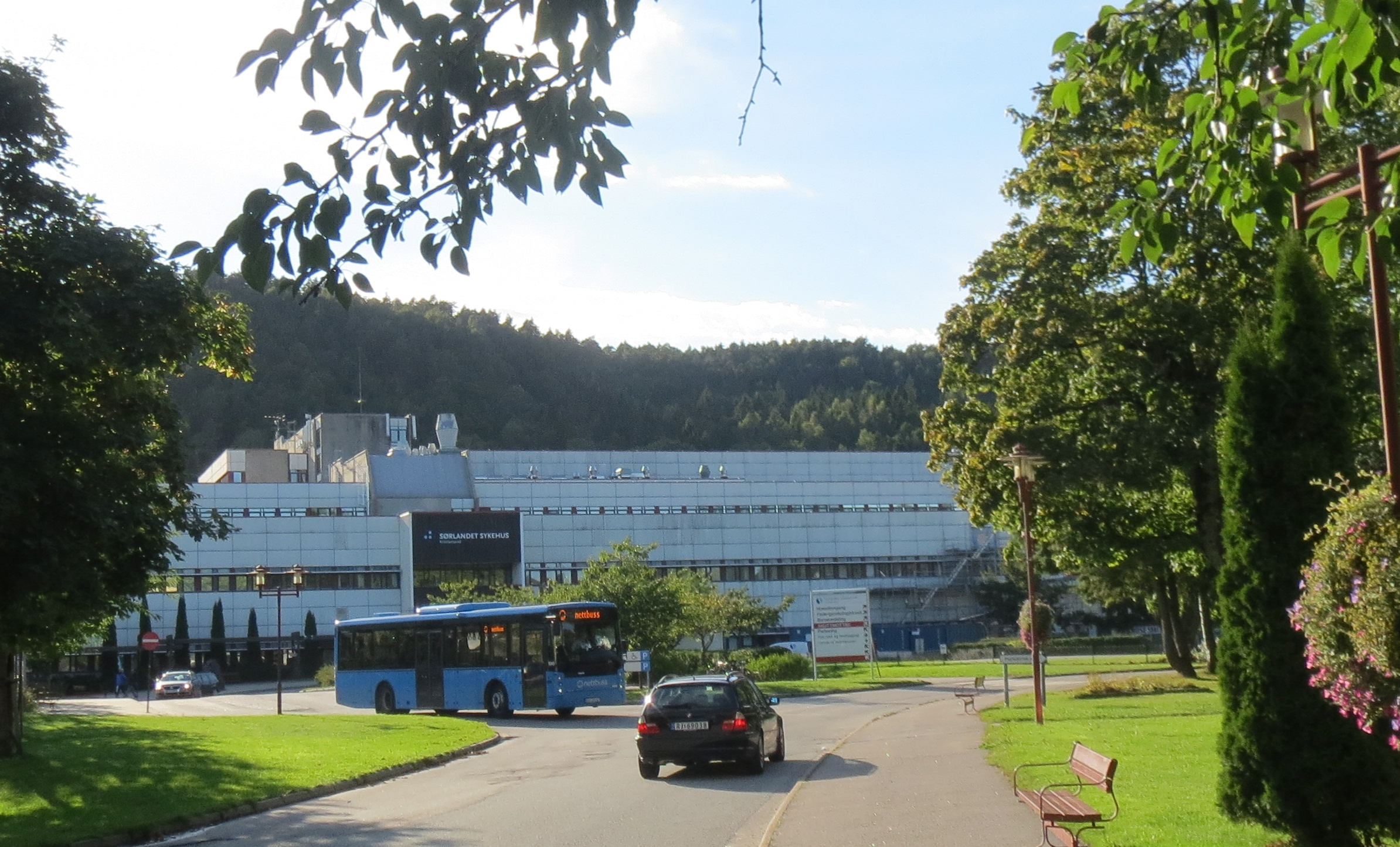
Sørlandet Hospital Kristiansand

Sørlandet Hospital Kristiansand (Norwegian: Sørlandet Sykehus Kristiansand) is located in Kristiansand Municipality, Agder County in Norway, and is one of the three public hospitals within the Hospital of Southern Norway and is a regional hospital. It was previously called Kristiansand Sentralsykehus and was located in Tordenskjoldsgate in Kvadraturen (the city center).

Most of the hospital moved to Eg, about 2 kilometres (1.2 mi) north of downtown, in the 1980s, where a psychiatric hospital (Eg Hospital) already existed. After the move, the departments of general medicine and psychiatry were merged into a single unit.

The hospital has modern facilities and is geographically centralized, offering comprehensive clinical, surgical, medical, and psychiatric services. It provides both emergency medical care and outpatient treatment.

There are maternity clinic, psychiatric treatment and inpatient care, substance abuse- and addiction treatment and an ambulance station and helipad at Eg. Mental Health Clinic - psychiatry and addiction treatment has limited psychiatric treatment for adults in Kristiansand and Arendal.

At Sørlandet Hospital Kristiansand are also numerous administrative and operational support services for the hospital trust.
