= Nordtjønnåsen =

- Neighborhood in Kristiansand
- Interactive map of Nordtjønnåsen
- Coordinates: 58.1286°N 07.9316°E
- Country: Norway
- County: Agder
- Municipality: Kristiansand
- Borough: Vågsbygd
- District: Vågsbygd
- Elevation: 75 m (246 ft)
- Time zone: UTC+01:00 (CET)
  - Summer (DST): UTC+02:00 (CEST)

Nordtjønnåsen is a neighbourhood in the city of Kristiansand in Agder county, Norway. It is located in the borough of Vågsbygd and in the district of Vågsbygd. The neighborhood is located in the northwestern corner of the district, south of Slettheia and west of Hasselbakken.
