= Eg (Kristiansand) =

- Neighbourhood in Kristiansand
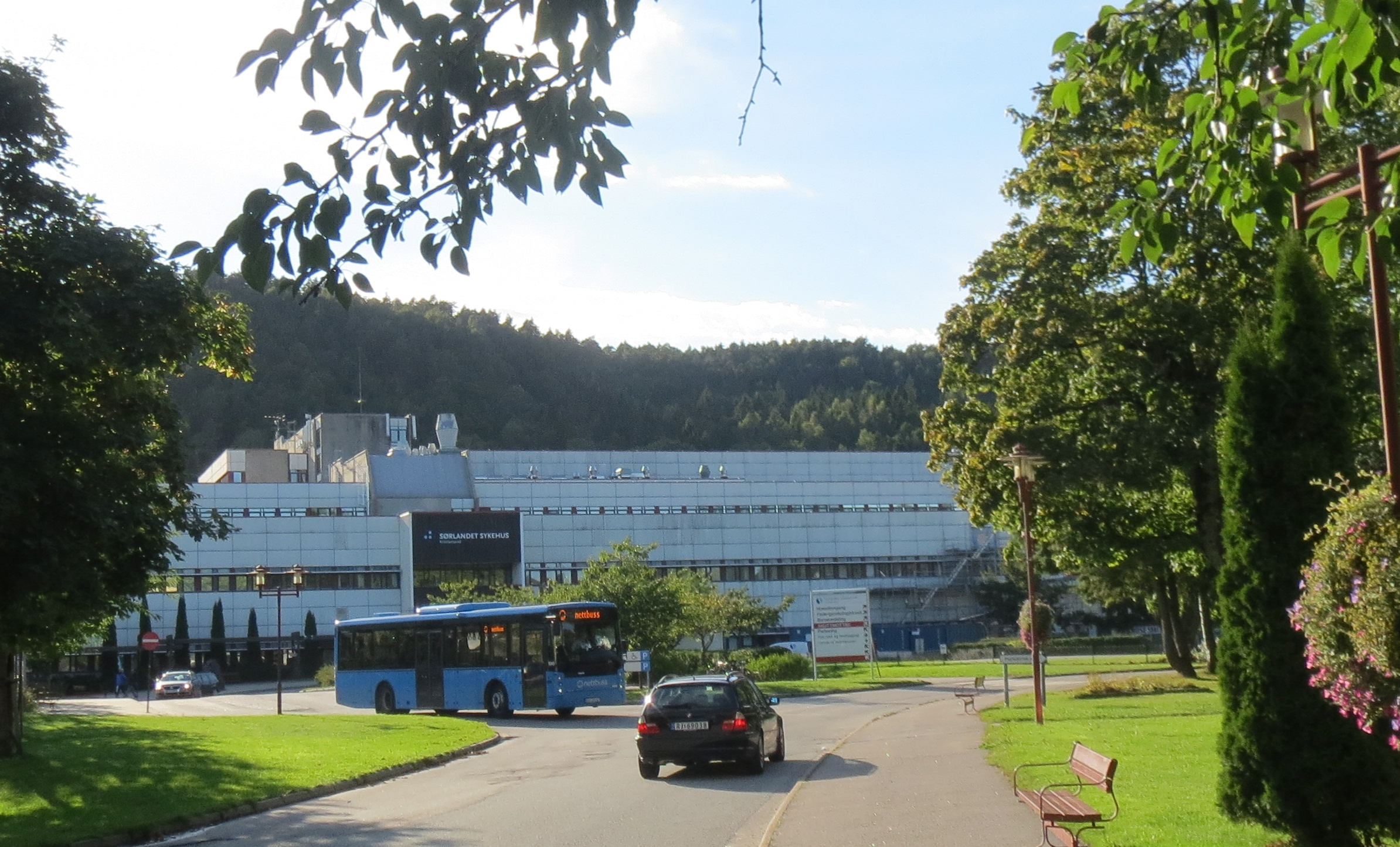
- Sørlandet Hospital
- Interactive map of Eg
- Coordinates: 58°09′28″N 7°59′19″E
- Country: Norway
- County: Agder
- Municipality: Kristiansand
- Borough: Kvadraturen
- District: Kvadraturen

Population (2014)
  - Total: 500
- Postal code: 4615
- Area code: 38

Eg is a neighbourhood in the city of Kristiansand in Agder county, Norway. It is the only neighborhood in the borough that is located outside of the downtown city centre of Kristiansand (being about 2 kilometres (1.2 mi) north of the downtown). The main hospital for all of Southern Norway, Sørlandet Hospital Kristiansand, is located on the north side of Eg. Eg is located between the river Otra and the Baneheia park.

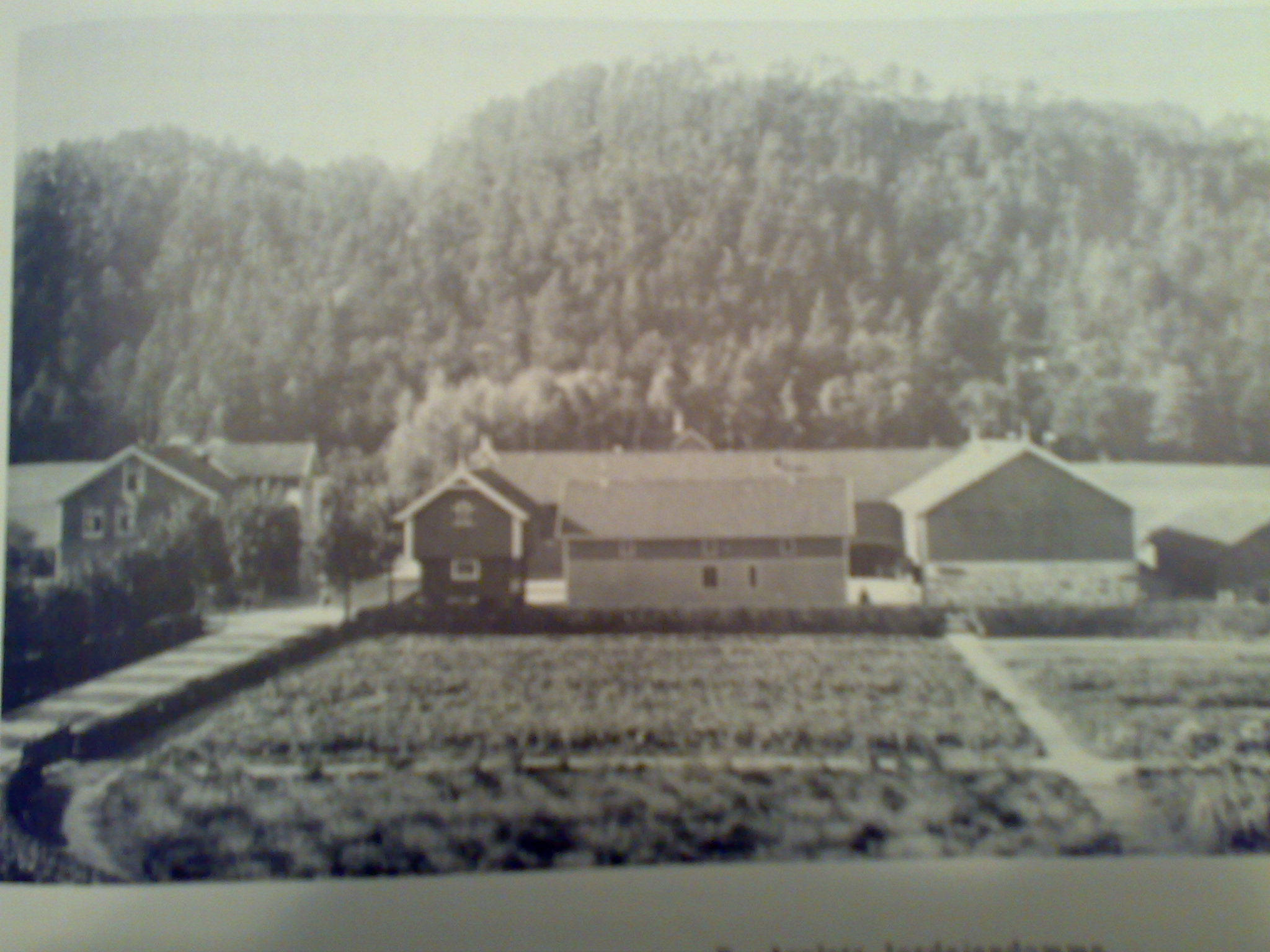
The farm at Eg, c.1920

The name Eg comes from Eik (meaning "Oak"), because of the thick oakwood which can still be found in the area. Some of the oldest settlements in Kristiansand are in the area of Eg. When the Kristiansand area was only farmland, one of the four largest farms was located at Eg. The others were located at Gimle, Grim, and Kjos.

Today, there is an elementary school and a kindergarten located at Eg. The neighbourhood is mostly apartments. Eg is served by bus line 12 from Kjos Haveby to the hospital.

Bus lines from Eg
Line	Destination
12	Kjos Haveby – Eg-Sykehuset
12	Kvadraturen – Eg-Sykehuset
A25	Tømmerstø Odderhei-Holte – Eg-Sykehuset
900	Mandal-Lista – Eg-Sykehuset

== See also ==
- Kvadraturen
- Kristiansand
- Hospital of Southern Norway
