= Kjos (Kristiansand) =

- Neighbourhood in Kristiansand
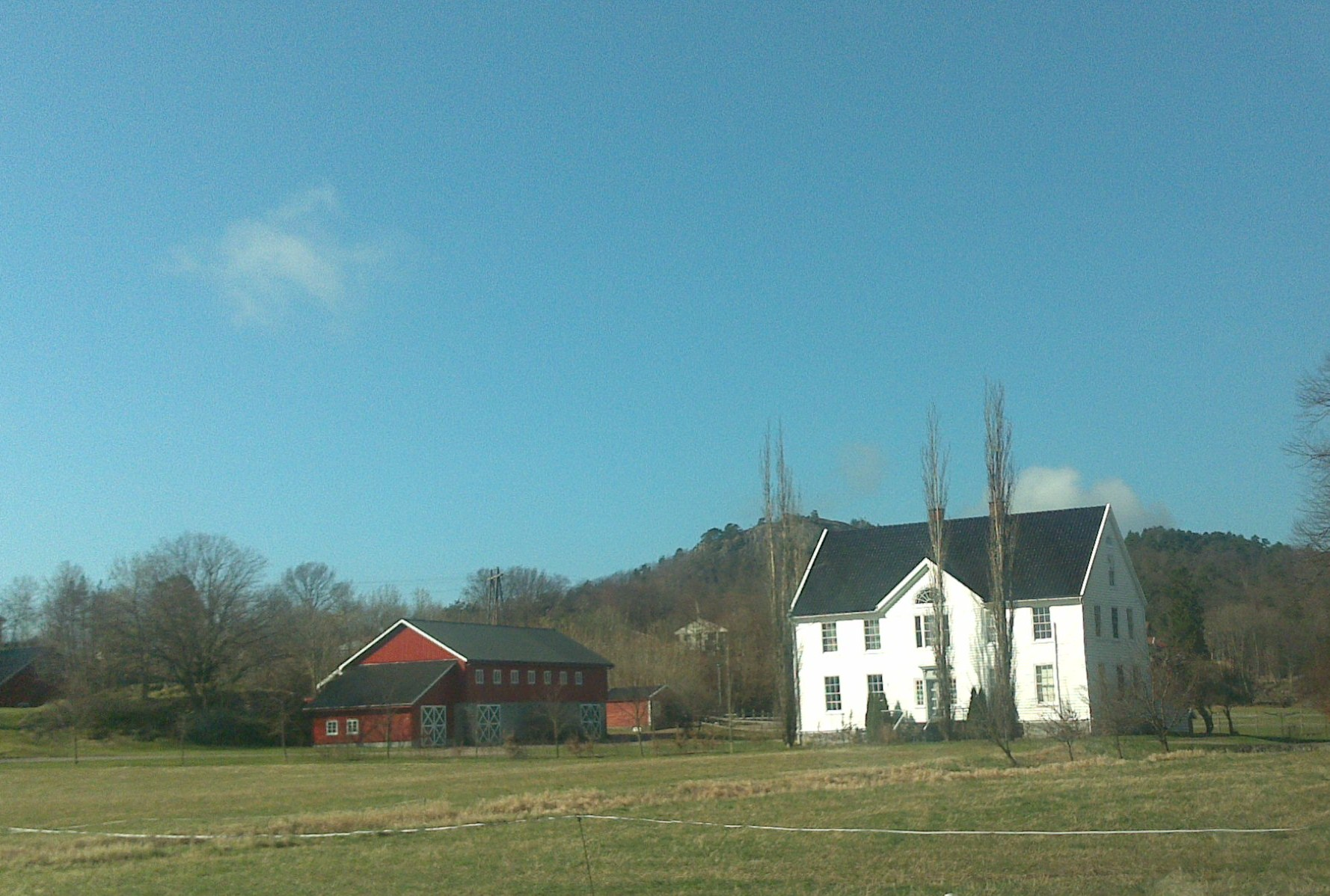
- Kjos
- Interactive map of Kjos
- Coordinates: 58°07′02″N 7°57′03″E
- Country: Norway
- County: Agder
- City: Kristiansand
- District: Vågsbygd
- Borough: Vågsbygd
- ZIP code: 4620
- Area code: 38

Kjos is a neighbourhood in the city of Kristiansand in Agder county, Norway. It is located in the Vågsbygd borough, south of Augland and east of Åsane.
