= Hospital of Southern Norway =

Health trust in Norway

Coordinates: 58°09′51″N 7°58′53″E

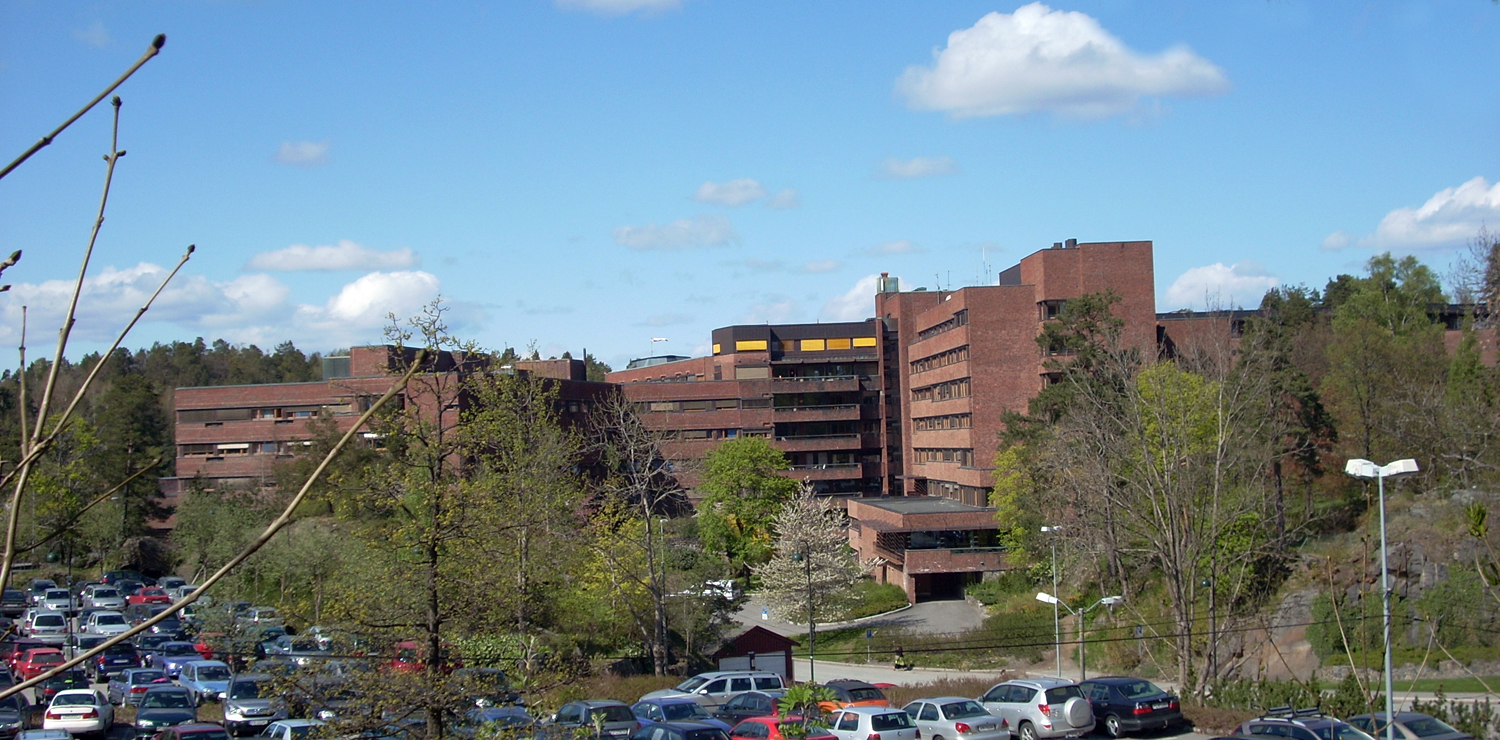
Sørlandet Hospital Arendal, seen from the north.

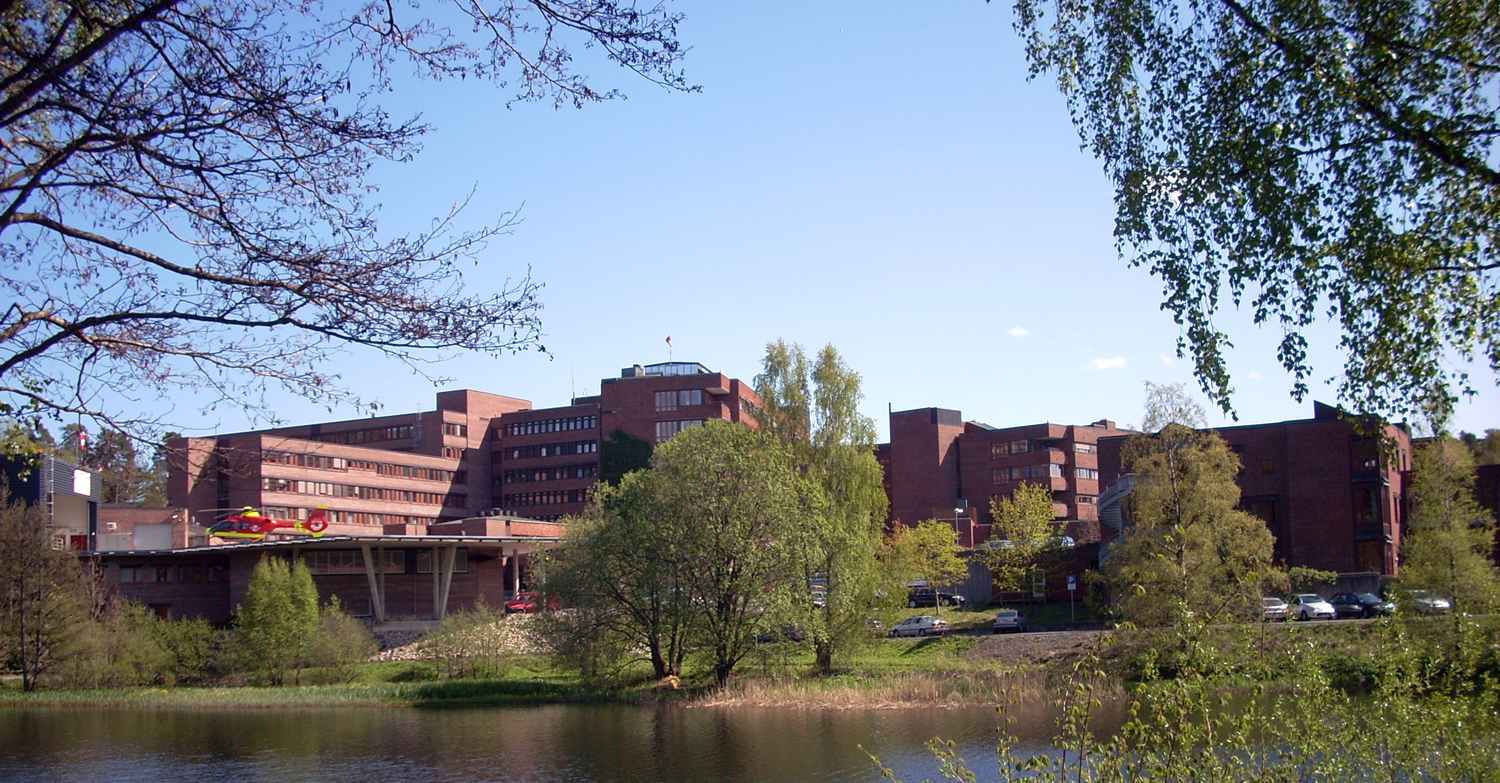
Sørlandet Hospital Arendal, seen from the southeast.

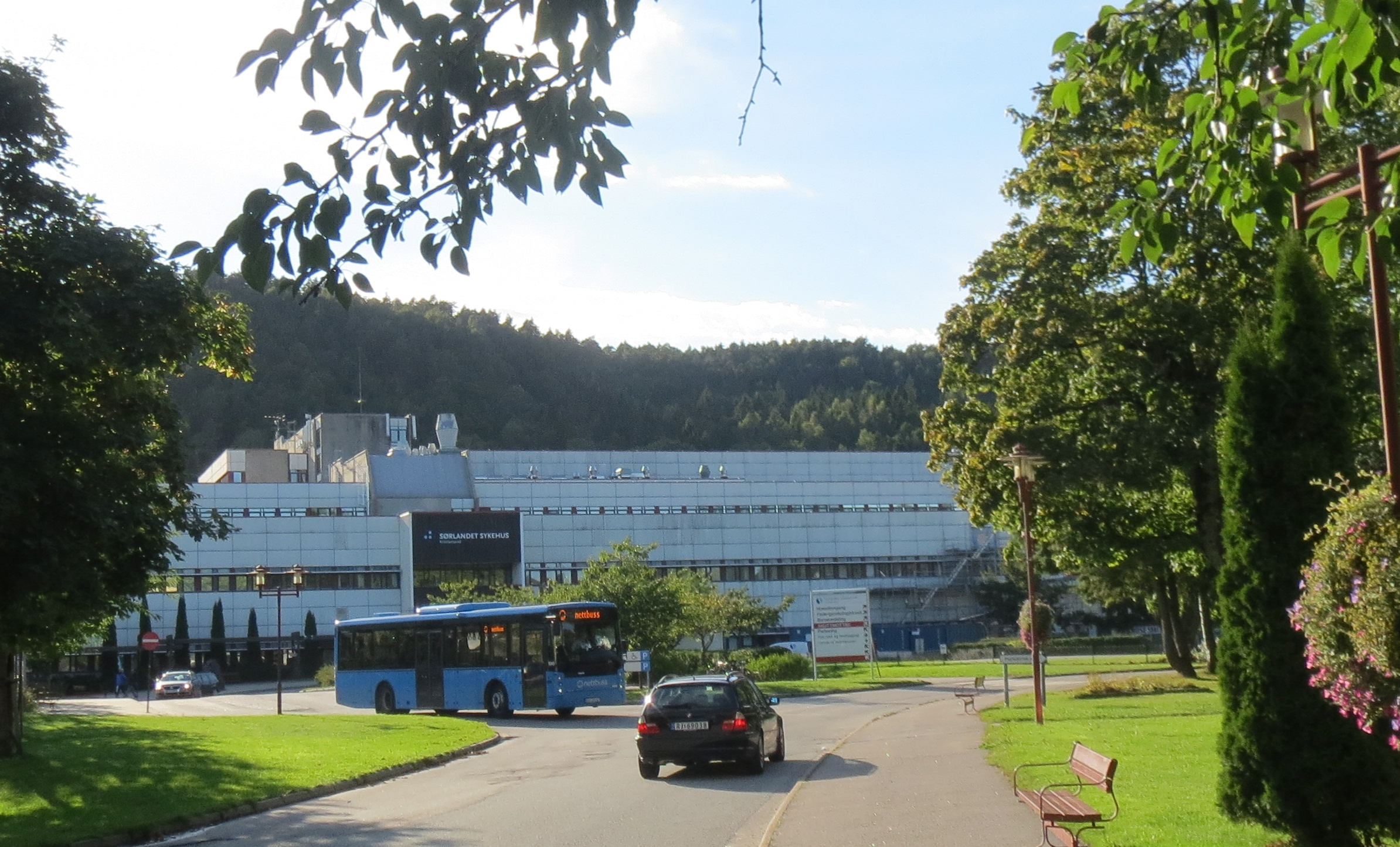
Sørlandet Hospital Kristiansand at the main entrance

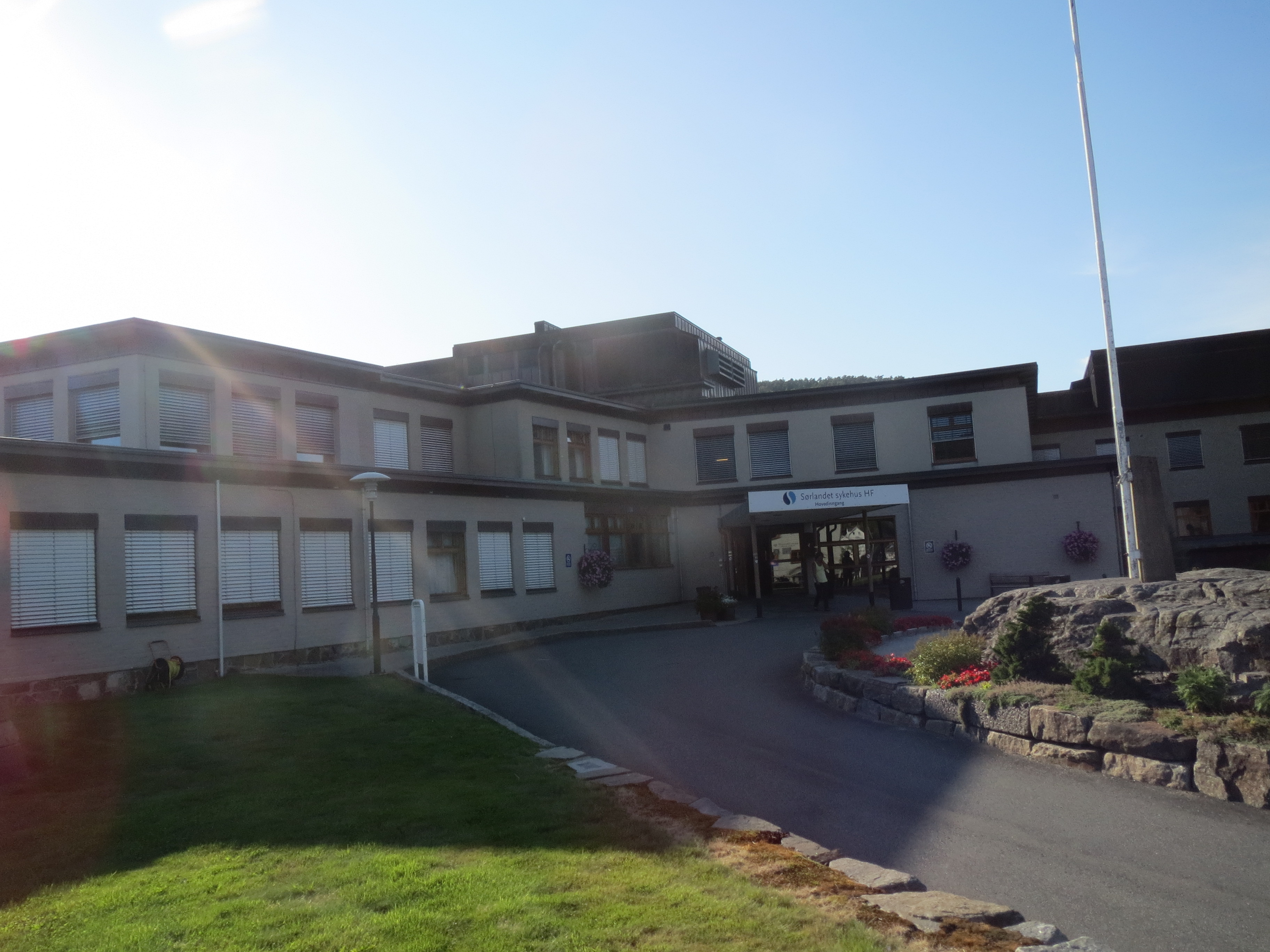
Sørlandet Hospital Flekkefjord at the main entrance

Hospital of Southern Norway (Norwegian: Sørlandet sykehus Helse Foretak, shortened SSHF) is the trust which runs the hospitals in Agder county, Norway. The general hospitals of Agder counties are joined together under one trust by the state, with Helse Sør-Øst as owner.

The trust is organised into six clinics, which have medical specialities independent of their geographical placement. The five clinics are:

- Medical clinic
- Surgical clinic
- Clinic for psychiatric health - psychiatry and dependency behaviour
- Medical service clinic (related functions)
- Clinic for radiology
- Rehabilitation unit

Hospital of Southern Norway has large medical centres in the towns of Arendal, Kristiansand, and Flekkefjord. There are also smaller centres in the towns of Risør, Grimstad, Mandal and Farsund. In addition, there are small psychiatric drop-ins in many of the smaller municipalities, often with responsibility for patients from neighbouring municipalities.

In 2004, the hospital took responsibility for alcoholism treatment in Agder, and this came under the psychiatric and psychological treatment in Arendal and Kristiansand.

== History ==
Prior to the state taking control of the hospitals on 1 February 2003, the hospital functions were dealt with by individual municipalities. Within the trust of Hospital of Southern Norway, there are the following hospitals:

- Aust-Agder Central Hospital Arendal, ASA (now: Sørlandet Hospital Arendal)
- Vest-Agder Central Hospital (now: Sørlandet Hospital Kristiansand)
- Eg Hospital (now: Psychiatric Hospital (PSA), Kristiansand)
- Farsund Hospital (now: Disbanded and sold to Farsund Municipality)
- Flekkefjord Hospital (now: Sørlandet Hospital Flekkefjord)
- Mandal Hospital (now: Sørlandet Hospital Mandal)
