= Kristiansand =

City in Agder, Norway

- Town/City
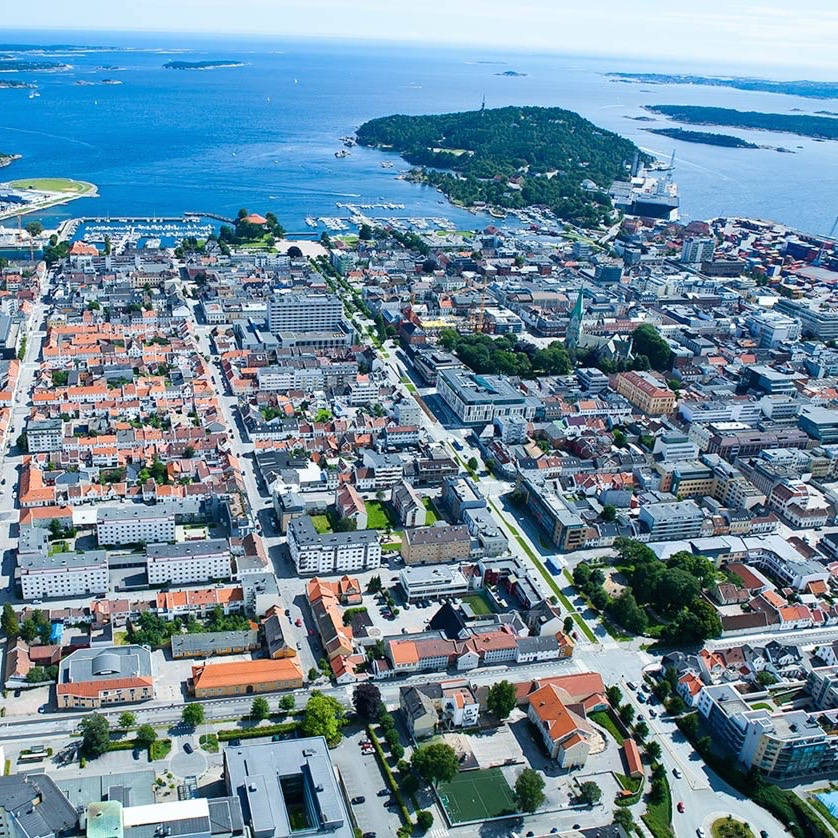
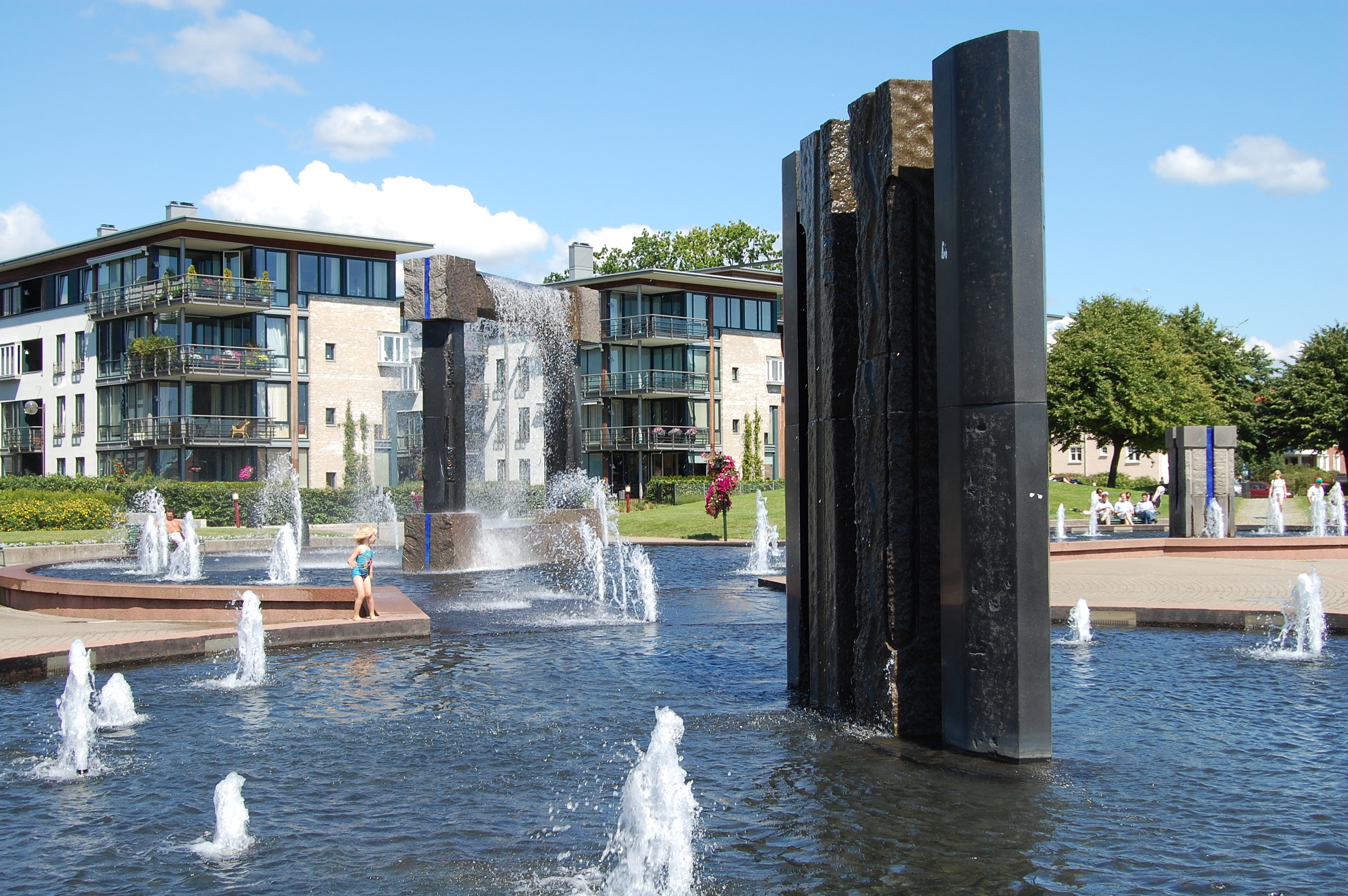
- Views of the city

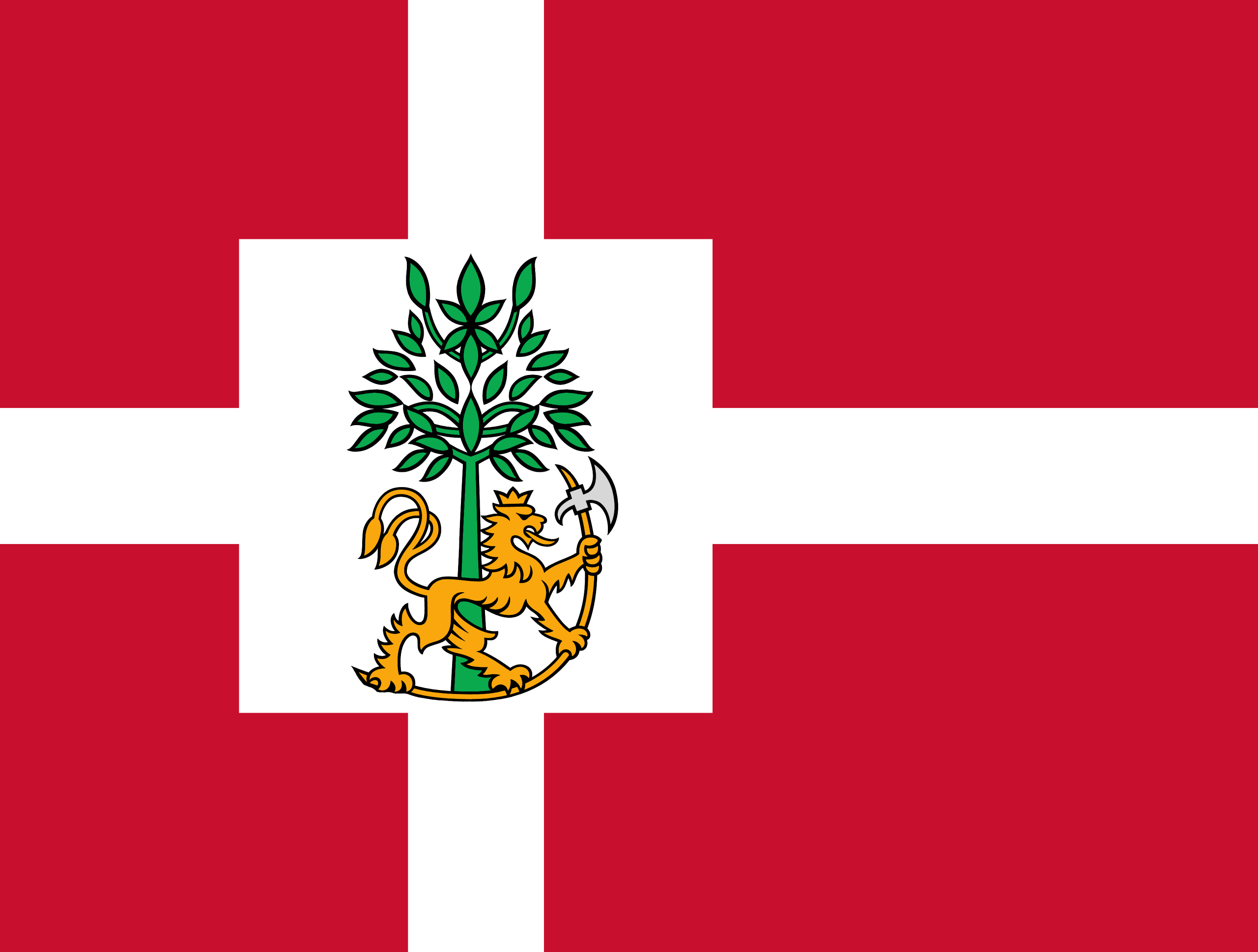
- Flag Coat of arms
- Nickname: Port of Norway
- Interactive map of Kristiansand
- Coordinates: 58.14671°N 7.9956°E
- Country: Norway
- Region: Southern Norway
- County: Agder
- District: Sørlandet
- Municipality: Kristiansand Municipality
- Established as
- Kjøpstad: 1641

Area
  - Town/City: 24.37 km^{2} (9.41 sq mi)
- Elevation: 7 m (23 ft)

Population (2025)
  - Town/City: 67,920
  - Rank: 5th in Norway
  - Density: 2,787/km^{2} (7,220/sq mi)
  - Metro: 119,287
- Demonym(s): Kristiansander, (Note: Written using Norwegian Bokmål) Kristiansandar (Note: Written using Norwegian Nynorsk)
- Time zone: UTC+01:00 (CET)
  - Summer (DST): UTC+02:00 (CEST)
- Post Code: 4604 Kristiansand S

Kristiansand (Norwegian pronunciation: [ˈkrɪstɪansan]) is a city located within Kristiansand Municipality in Agder county, Norway. The city is the administrative centre of both Kristiansand Municipality and Agder county. The city sits along the southern coast of Norway, along the Skagerrak.

The 24.37-square-kilometre (6,020-acre) city has a population (2025) of 67,920 and a population density of 2,787 inhabitants per square kilometre (7,220/sq mi). This means that Kristiansand ranks the 8th largest urban area in Norway. Due to its size, the city is divided into several subdivisions called boroughs: Kvadraturen, Grim, Lund, Vågsbygd, and Oddernes. These boroughs are also sub-divided into smaller districts. Outside of the city of Kristiansand (and within Kristiansand Municipality), there are two other boroughs called Songdalen and Søgne which are much more rural than the city itself. Songdalen and Søgne became part of Kristiansand Municipality in 2020.

The city of Kristiansand is located on four main roads:

- the European route E18 highway goes to the northeast and connects to Arendal, Porsgrunn, Drammen, and Oslo
- the European route E39 highways goes to the west and connects to Mandal, Flekkefjord, Sandnes, and Stavanger (and on along the west coast of Norway)
- Norwegian National Road 9 goes to the northwest and connects to Vennesla, Evje, and the Setesdal valley
- Norwegian National Road 41 goes to the north and connects to Kristiansand Airport, Kjevik, Tveit, Birkeland, northern Agder, and Telemark

The city of Kristiansand is a very popular place for tourists, especially during the summer season. Kristiansand Zoo and Amusement Park is the largest zoo in Norway, and it lies just east of the city. It receives over 900,000 visitors every year. Markens Street is the main pedestrian street in downtown Kristiansand, with lots of shops and restaurants. Bystranda is a city beach located in Kvadraturen; Hamresanden beach is the longest beach in Kristiansand, located just east of the city, near the airport. Hamresanden Camping is a popular family activity during the summer season. The city hosts a free weekly concert in downtown Kristiansand in the summertime. Outside the city is the industrial park Sørlandsparken, which includes Sørlandssenteret, Norway's largest mall.

== Name ==
The city (and municipality) is named after the King Christian IV, who founded the city on 5 July 1641. The second part of the city's name, sand, comes from the Old Norse word sandr which means "sand" or "sandy ground". This refers to the sandy headland upon which the city was originally built.

Historically, the name was usually written Christianssand until 1877, although the map of the mapmaker Pontoppidan from 1785 spelled the name Christiansand (with a single 's'). In 1877, an official spelling reform aimed at bringing city names into line with regular Norwegian orthography (using a K instead of a Ch) changed the name to Kristianssand (the cities of Kristiansund and Kristiania also had their spellings changed under the same reform). Despite this change, a number of businesses and associations retain the "Ch" spelling. The name was again changed to its present form, Kristiansand (single "s"), in 1889.

In 2012, the mayor of Kristiansand Municipality, Arvid Grundekjøn, proposed that the city be renamed Christianssand, arguing that "Kristiansand" is grammatically meaningless and that Christianssand stands for tradition. This proposal was not well received by the locals and the mayor has not pushed this further.

== History ==
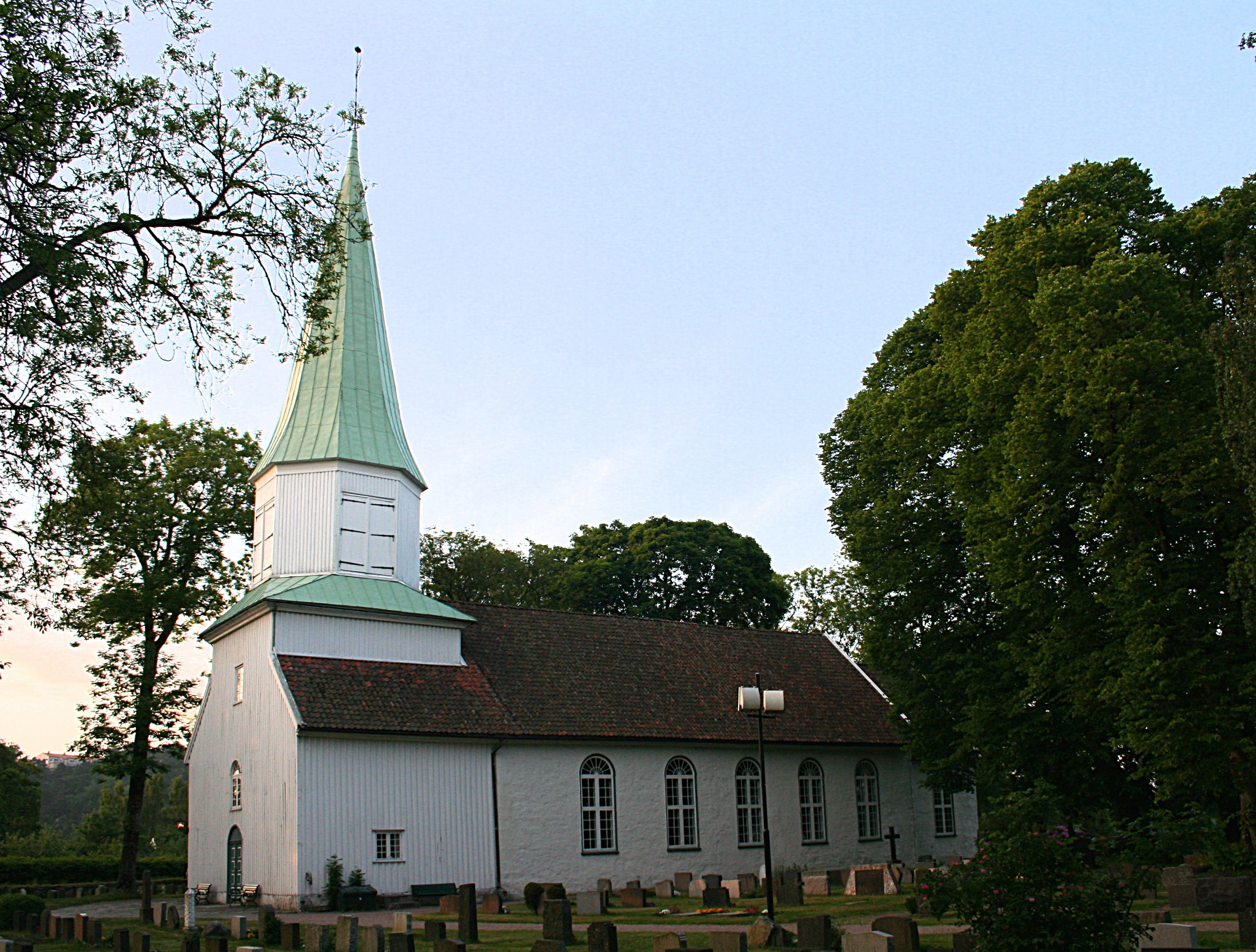
Oddernes Church in Lund, Kristiansand, erected around 1040

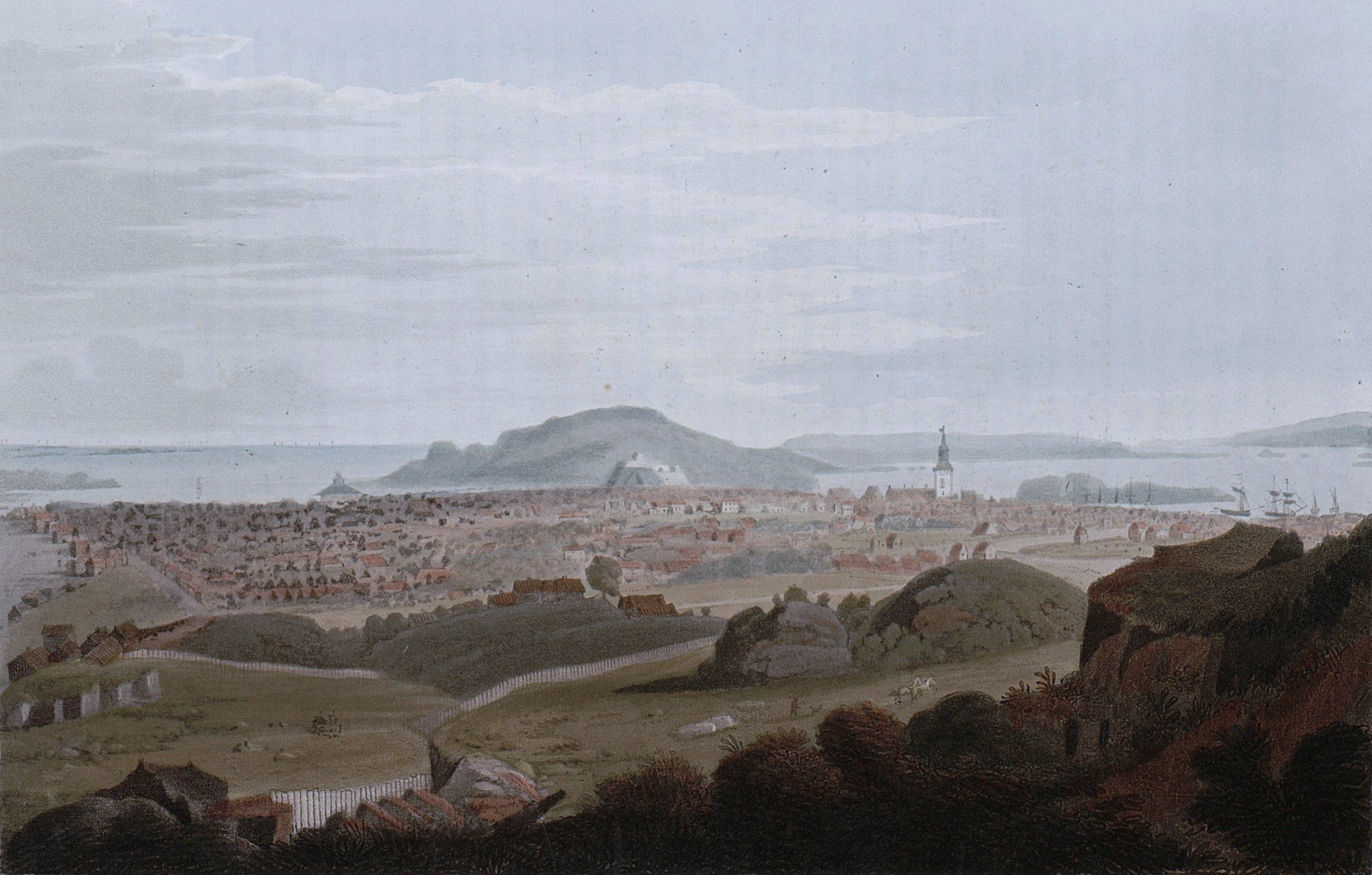
Kristiansand in summer 1800, painted by J. W. Edy

=== Prehistory and early history ===
The Kristiansand area has been inhabited since prehistoric times. In 1996, the well-preserved skeleton of a woman dating to approximately 6500 BC was discovered in Søgne, just west of the city of Kristiansand. This demonstrates very early habitation of the archipelago. Grauthelleren (Grathelleren), located on Fidjane, is believed to be a Stone Age settlement. The first discovery in Norway of a Sarup enclosure (a Neolithic form of ritual enclosure first identified at Sarup on the Danish island of Funen) was made in 2010 at Hamresanden and dates to c. 3400 BC. Archaeological excavations to the east of Oddernes Church have uncovered rural settlements that existed during the centuries immediately before and after the start of the common era. Together with a corresponding discovery in Rogaland, these settlements are unique in the Norwegian context; isolated farms, rather than villages, were the norm in ancient Norway. Other discoveries in grave mounds around the church, in the Lund section of the city, indicate habitation beginning c. 400 AD, and 25 cooking pits that were found immediately outside the church wall in 1907 are probably even older. One of the largest pre-Christian burial grounds in South Norway was formerly located to the south and west of the church. A royal centre is thought to have existed at Oddernes before 800, and the church was built around 1040.

Before the stone church was built, one or perhaps two wooden post churches are believed to have stood on the same spot. A few years ago, excavations were carried out under and around the runestone when it was moved to the church porch; the grave finds indicated that the churchyard must already have been unusually large in the High Middle Ages. This means that the area must have had a large population before it was reduced by the Black Death.

In the 14th and 15th centuries, there was already a busy port and a small village on the Otra at the lowest point of today's Lund neighbourhood (Lahelle). Another important element in the development of Kristiansand was the harbor on the island of Flekkerøy, which was the most important on the Skagerrak beginning in the 16th century and was first fortified under King Christian III in 1555. In 1635, King Christian IV ordered his feudal seigneur, Palle Rosenkrantz, to move from Nedenes and build a royal palace on the island.

=== Foundation to 1900 ===
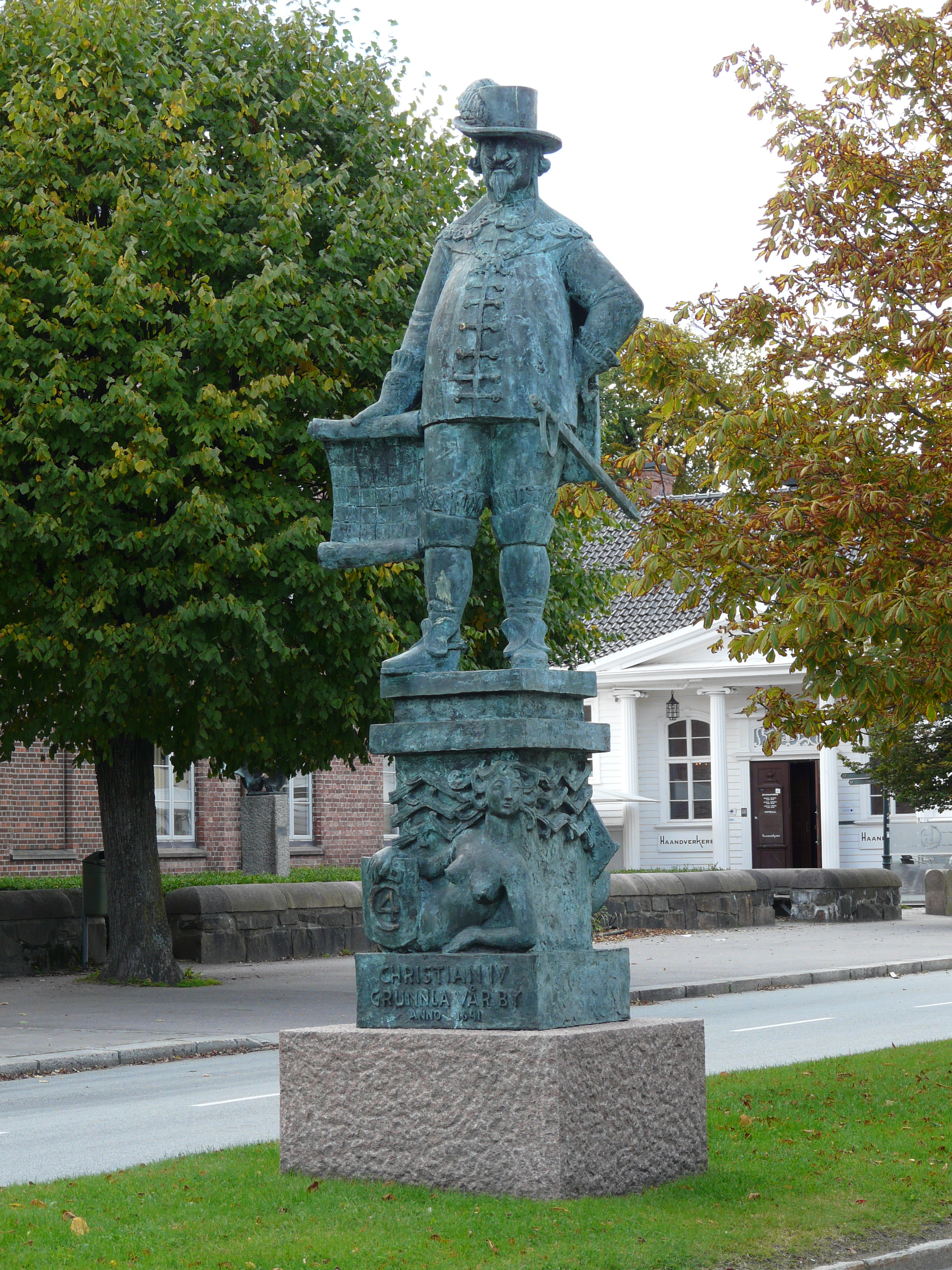
Monument of King Christian IV, located in the Festningsgaten (The Fortress Street), Kristiansand. The plaque reads: "Christian IV Grunnla Vår By Anno 1641" - "Christian IV Founded Our City Anno 1641".

Christian IV (renowned for having founded many towns) visited the location in 1630 and 1635, and on 5 July 1641 formally founded the town of Christianssand on the "sand" on the opposite bank of the Torridalselva (Otra). The town was laid out in Renaissance style on a grid plan (the central section now known as Kvadraturen = The Quarters), and merchants throughout Agder were commanded to move to the new town. In return, they were to receive a variety of trading privileges and a ten-year tax exemption.

In 1666, Christianssand became a garrison town and was heavily fortified. In 1682, King Christian V decided to relocate the bishopric there from Stavanger. Hence, the young city became the main city of the Christiansands stift (diocese) for the Church of Norway.

Christianssand experienced its first fire in 1734, which was devastating to the city. Later in the 18th century, after the American Revolutionary War, the town's shipbuilders experienced an economic boom that lasted until the Napoleonic Wars, which struck a severe blow to Kristiansand's overseas trade. Denmark–Norway supported France in the conflict, and as a result Norwegian ports including Kristiansand were blockaded by the Royal Navy, as recounted in Henrik Ibsen's Terje Vigen. By the 1830s, the town's economy began to rebound, and the growth in the Norwegian shipping industry was important for Kristiansand. It was the only part of Norway where oak trees flourished, a major resource for the country's shipbuilding industry. Large numbers of lobsters were collected off the coast and sent to London during the mid-19th century. The population of Kristiansand was about 12,000 people by 1848.

On 1 January 1838, the new formannskapsdistrikt law went into effect. This new law granted municipal self-government to every parish (prestegjeld) and city throughout Norway. As a city, it formed its own municipal government (Kristiansand Municipality) and it was surrounded by the rural Oddernes Municipality.

The city of Kristiansand had a quarantine station for maritime traffic and hospital at Odderøya for cholera patients that opened in 1804. The city had far fewer deaths than the surrounding area, largely attributable to the quarantine station and the hospital. For example, during the period of 1833–1866, Drammen had 544 cholera patients, of which 336 died. During this same period, Kristiansand only experienced 15 deaths from cholera.

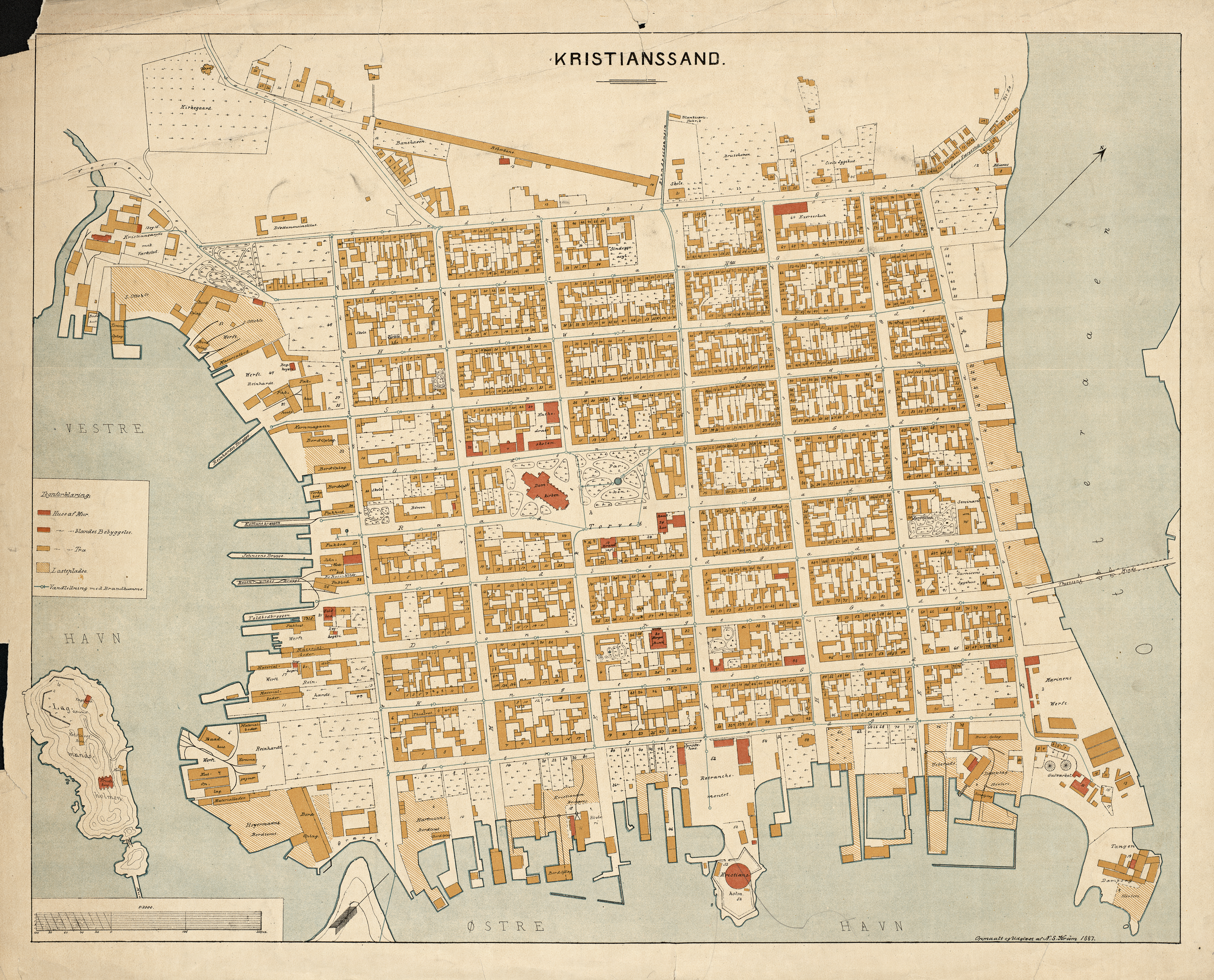
Map of downtown Kristiansand from 1887

Another important development during the 19th century was the foundation in 1881 of Eg Sindssygeasyl, the second central psychiatric institution in Norway (after Gaustad). The psychiatric hospital drew highly specialized doctors to the city and also provided many jobs for women.

The most recent major fire, in 1892, left half the original section of the city in ashes. It burned buildings as far as the cathedral, which had been rebuilt in brick after a previous fire in 1880.

=== 1900 onward ===
With the development of hydropower in southern Norway, the city gradually developed an industrial base, particularly with the establishment in 1910 of the nickel refinery Kristiansands Nikkelraffineringsverk AS (later Falconbridge Nikkelverk, now Glencore Nikkelverk). From an economic perspective, the First World War was a good time for Kristiansand, as a neutral shipping city. The crises that followed with the gold standard politics of the 1920s and the world economic crisis of the 1930s were also deeply felt in a trading city like Kristiansand.

On 1 July 1921, the city of Kristiansand got larger by annexing a part of the neighboring Oddernes Municipality, gaining 2,164 more residents along with much more land for the growing city.

The labour movement had important pioneers in the city, and Leon Trotsky spent about a year of his exile in the archipelago offshore from Kristiansand. Arnulf Øverland took him from the nearby Randesund Municipality to Ny-Hellesund in the nearby Søgne Municipality in 1936. In the interwar period Kristiansand was a centre for intellectuals, especially after the architect Thilo Schoder settled there in 1932.

The city of Kristiansand was attacked by German naval forces and the Luftwaffe during the Operation Weserübung on 9 April 1940. The naval forces met fierce resistance from Norwegian coastal artillery at Odderøya. Bombs and grenades also hit the downtown and the 70 meter high church tower of the Kristiansand Cathedral was hit by accident. The third attack attempt on the city succeeded because a signal flag was confused with a French national flag and the misunderstanding was not discovered until it was too late. The city was occupied by a force of 800 men.

During the 1960s, there were many municipal mergers across Norway due to the work of the Schei Committee. On 1 January 1965, the following areas were merged to form a much larger Kristiansand Municipality which included the city center and large rural areas surrounding the city:

- all of Kristiansand Municipality (population: 27,100)
- all of Oddernes Municipality (population: 18,668)
- all of Randesund Municipality (population: 1,672)
- all of Tveit Municipality (population: 2,802)

Post-war construction in the city included further development of the borough of Lund, and in the 1960s and 1970s the borough of Vågsbygd to the west was developed into a section with 20,000 inhabitants. In the 1980s, industry and business in the city declined, in part because of the 1986 fire at the Hotel Caledonien. But beginning in the second half of the 1990s, business increased in momentum with the development of enterprises for marine and offshore equipment, security technology and drilling.

The older municipal archives for Kristiansand (and the former municipalities) are currently held at the Inter-Municipal Archives in Vest-Agder (IKAVA). This includes documents concerning, for example, local councils, chairmanships, poor boards, school boards and archives including among other things personal documents in the form of client records, tax records, and also school records.

In 2020, there were many municipal and county mergers across Norway due to the work of the Solberg cabinet. Historically, this municipality was part of the old Vest-Agder county. On 1 January 2020, the municipality became a part of the newly-formed Agder county (after Aust-Agder and Vest-Agder counties were merged). Also on 1 January 2020, the following areas were merged to form a much larger Kristiansand Municipality:

- all of Kristiansand Municipality (population: 92,282)
- all of Songdalen Municipality (population: 6,706)
- all of Søgne Municipality (population: 11,403)

=== Coat-of-arms ===
The arms of Kristiansand were granted on 8 December 1909 and are based on the oldest seal of the city, dating from 1643. In 1643 King Christian IV granted the young town the right to use a seal with the Norwegian lion and the royal crown. The crown indicates that the city was founded by the king. The other major element in the arms is a tree. As the species of tree is not specified, there are several known versions with differently shaped trees. A second seal, from 1658, shows a tree with leaves and what look like pine cones. On the base of the crown are the letters R. F. P., standing for Regna Firma Pietas, "Piety strengthens the realm"; this was Christian IV's motto. Around the seal of the city is its motto, Cavsa Triumphat Tandem Bona, "A good cause prevails in the end".

== Geography ==
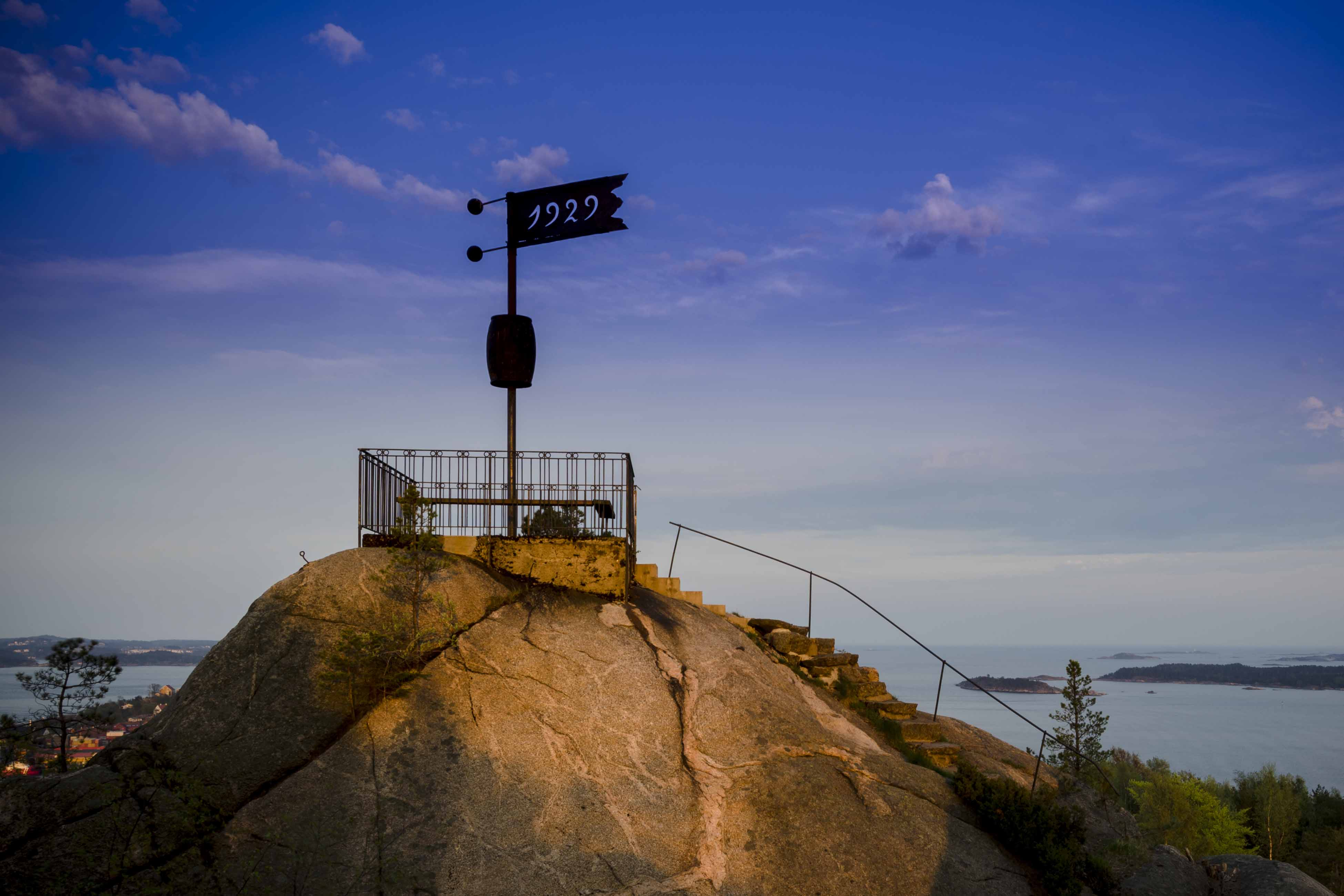
Dueknipen, Kristiansand

The city of Kristiansand is strategically located on the Skagerrak, and until the opening of the Kiel Canal between the North Sea and the Baltic was very important militarily and geopolitically. This meant that for centuries it served as a military stronghold, first as Harald Fairhair's royal residence, then as a Danish-Norwegian fortress, and later as a garrison town. Kristiansand is a gateway to and from the continent, with ferry service to Denmark and a terminus of the railway line along the southern edge of South Norway.

Geologically, this part of Agder is part of the Swedo-Norwegian Base Mountain Shield, the southwestern section of the Baltic Shield, and consists of two main geological formations of Proterozoic rocks that were formed in the Gothic and later Swedo-Norwegian orogenies, with significant metamorphism during the latter. There is a substrate of 1,600–1,450 million-year-old slate, quartzite, marble and amphibolite with some hornblende gneiss, and overlaid on this acidic surface structures of both granite and granodiorite (in general 1,250–1,000 million years old, in some places 1,550–1,480 million years old). The Bamblefelt geological area starts to the east of the municipality and extends to Grenland.

The last Swedo-Norwegian formations are evident in large formations of granite. There are also incidences of gabbro and diorite, less commonly eclogite. The Caledonian orogeny did not affect this area. Faults run southwest–northeast. In ancient times there was a volcano off Flekkeroy, which left deposits of volcanic rock just north of central Kristiansand, on the site of the estate of Eg, now occupied by the Hospital of Southern Norway.

Near the city, there are deep woods. In Baneheia and at the former coastal artillery fortress on Odderøya, there are lighted ski trails and walking paths specially prepared for wheelchair users. People go swimming in Baneheia in the summer as well

Two major rivers, the Otra and the Tovdalselva, flow into the Skagerrak at Kristiansand.

=== Climate ===
Fiskebrygga

Kristiansand has a temperate oceanic climate (Köppen: Cfb) with cool to cold winters and mild summers. The coastal parts of the Skagerrak coast, which includes Kristiansand, is the sunniest part of Norway. Snow generally occurs in late December and in January and February; it may be heavy (the snow record at Kjevik airport is 170 centimetres (67 in)) but rarely stays long on the coast; see Climate of Norway. Due to warming in the more recent decades, snow often melts after a few days. In the summer most locals go to the Fiskebrygga, the archipelago opposite the city, and Hamresanden Beach, which is located about 10 minutes from the city centre near Kjevik airport. People from Denmark, Sweden, Germany, the UK and other European countries also visit this beach in the summer during their travels.

The all-time high 32.6 °C (90.7 °F) at Kristiansand airport was recorded August 1975. The all-time low at the airport −28.2 °C (−18.8 °F) was recorded January 1982. The temperature seldom reaches 30 °C (86 °F), but most days in July reaches 21 °C (70 °F) or more. The warmest month ever was July 1901 with mean 21.6 °C (71 °F) at an earlier weather station (Kristiansand S - Eg). The warmest month at the airport was July 2018 with 24-hr average 19.9 °C (68 °F) and average daily high 25.8 °C (78 °F). July 2018 was also the sunniest month on record with 422 sunhours, and the year 2018 recorded 2126 sunhours - despite December recording just 1 sunhr as cloudiest month on record in Kristiansand. The cloudiest July recorded 156 sunhours (2007). Kristiansand has the national record for the sunniest February (153 sunhrs in 1986), sunniest April (323 hrs in 2021), sunniest August (343 hrs in 1995) and sunniest September (241 hrs in 1959). The wettest month on record was October 1976 with 560 mm precipitation, and the driest was April 1974 with no precipitation at all.

Climate data for Kristiansand Airport Kjevik 1991–2020 (12 m, extremes 1946–2021, sunhrs 1961–1990)
Month	Jan	Feb	Mar	Apr	May	Jun	Jul	Aug	Sep	Oct	Nov	Dec	Year
Record high °C (°F)	13.9 (57.0)	16.3 (61.3)	21.9 (71.4)	23.7 (74.7)	26.1 (79.0)	30.7 (87.3)	31.2 (88.2)	32.6 (90.7)	27.5 (81.5)	20.4 (68.7)	17.1 (62.8)	13.6 (56.5)	32.6 (90.7)
Mean daily maximum °C (°F)	3.2 (37.8)	3.7 (38.7)	6.2 (43.2)	10.5 (50.9)	15.4 (59.7)	18.9 (66.0)	21.1 (70.0)	20.4 (68.7)	16.5 (61.7)	11.5 (52.7)	6.9 (44.4)	3.9 (39.0)	11.5 (52.7)
Daily mean °C (°F)	0.2 (32.4)	0.2 (32.4)	2.3 (36.1)	6 (43)	10.7 (51.3)	14.4 (57.9)	16.6 (61.9)	15.9 (60.6)	12.4 (54.3)	7.9 (46.2)	4 (39)	0.9 (33.6)	7.6 (45.7)
Mean daily minimum °C (°F)	−2.8 (27.0)	−2.9 (26.8)	−1.3 (29.7)	1.9 (35.4)	5.8 (42.4)	9.7 (49.5)	12 (54)	11.6 (52.9)	8.8 (47.8)	4.5 (40.1)	1 (34)	−2.2 (28.0)	3.8 (39.0)
Record low °C (°F)	−28.2 (−18.8)	−27.9 (−18.2)	−21.7 (−7.1)	−11.7 (10.9)	−4.0 (24.8)	0 (32)	3.7 (38.7)	1.9 (35.4)	−2.3 (27.9)	−8.4 (16.9)	−18.8 (−1.8)	−22.9 (−9.2)	−28.2 (−18.8)
Average precipitation mm (inches)	147.2 (5.80)	98.2 (3.87)	87.5 (3.44)	64.8 (2.55)	80.3 (3.16)	85.5 (3.37)	80.6 (3.17)	120.7 (4.75)	134.3 (5.29)	169.7 (6.68)	161.3 (6.35)	151.4 (5.96)	1,381.5 (54.39)
Average precipitation days (≥ 1.0 mm)	15	12	10	9	9	9	10	12	12	14	15	15	142
Mean monthly sunshine hours	45	84	121	187	228	274	269	231	150	93	57	39	1,778
Source 1: Seklima
Source 2: NOAA-WMO averages 91–2020 Norway

Climate data for Oksøy Lighthouse 1991–2020 (9 m)
Month	Jan	Feb	Mar	Apr	May	Jun	Jul	Aug	Sep	Oct	Nov	Dec	Year
Mean daily maximum °C (°F)	4 (39)	3.5 (38.3)	5.2 (41.4)	8.6 (47.5)	13.1 (55.6)	16.7 (62.1)	18.9 (66.0)	19.1 (66.4)	15.8 (60.4)	11.4 (52.5)	7.6 (45.7)	5 (41)	10.7 (51.3)
Daily mean °C (°F)	2.2 (36.0)	1.5 (34.7)	3 (37)	5.9 (42.6)	10.1 (50.2)	13.6 (56.5)	16 (61)	16.2 (61.2)	13.4 (56.1)	9.4 (48.9)	5.9 (42.6)	3.3 (37.9)	8.4 (47.1)
Mean daily minimum °C (°F)	0.2 (32.4)	−0.3 (31.5)	0.9 (33.6)	3.8 (38.8)	7.8 (46.0)	11.5 (52.7)	13.9 (57.0)	14.1 (57.4)	11.5 (52.7)	7.5 (45.5)	4 (39)	1.3 (34.3)	6.4 (43.4)
Average precipitation mm (inches)	123 (4.8)	88 (3.5)	82 (3.2)	61 (2.4)	72 (2.8)	72 (2.8)	77 (3.0)	107 (4.2)	121 (4.8)	160 (6.3)	140 (5.5)	135 (5.3)	1,238 (48.6)
Source 1: yr.no (precipitation)
Source 2: NOAA-WMO averages 91–2020 Norway

Climate data for Kristiansand (1960–1990)
Month	Jan	Feb	Mar	Apr	May	Jun	Jul	Aug	Sep	Oct	Nov	Dec	Year
Record high °C (°F)	13.9 (57.0)	16.3 (61.3)	21.9 (71.4)	23.7 (74.7)	27.7 (81.9)	30.4 (86.7)	32.0 (89.6)	34.2 (93.6)	28.0 (82.4)	22.4 (72.3)	17.1 (62.8)	13.6 (56.5)	34.2 (93.6)
Mean daily maximum °C (°F)	1.3 (34.3)	1.9 (35.4)	4.4 (39.9)	8.9 (48.0)	14.3 (57.7)	18.6 (65.5)	20.1 (68.2)	19.3 (66.7)	15.6 (60.1)	11.4 (52.5)	6.2 (43.2)	3.0 (37.4)	10.4 (50.7)
Daily mean °C (°F)	−1.8 (28.8)	−1.6 (29.1)	1.1 (34.0)	4.8 (40.6)	10.0 (50.0)	14.0 (57.2)	15.6 (60.1)	14.9 (58.8)	11.7 (53.1)	8.0 (46.4)	3.2 (37.8)	−0.2 (31.6)	6.6 (44.0)
Mean daily minimum °C (°F)	−4.8 (23.4)	−5.1 (22.8)	−2.2 (28.0)	0.7 (33.3)	5.6 (42.1)	9.4 (48.9)	11.1 (52.0)	10.4 (50.7)	7.8 (46.0)	4.7 (40.5)	0.2 (32.4)	−3.4 (25.9)	2.9 (37.2)
Record low °C (°F)	−25.0 (−13.0)	−27.3 (−17.1)	−18.5 (−1.3)	−14.3 (6.3)	−5.0 (23.0)	2.0 (35.6)	3.0 (37.4)	2.5 (36.5)	−2.5 (27.5)	−5.0 (23.0)	−12.0 (10.4)	−19.0 (−2.2)	−27.3 (−17.1)
Average precipitation mm (inches)	121 (4.8)	80 (3.1)	87 (3.4)	59 (2.3)	86 (3.4)	75 (3.0)	88 (3.5)	118 (4.6)	141 (5.6)	164 (6.5)	164 (6.5)	116 (4.6)	1,380 (54.3)
Average snowfall cm (inches)	15 (5.9)	20 (7.9)	5 (2.0)	0 (0)	0 (0)	0 (0)	0 (0)	0 (0)	0 (0)	0 (0)	0.5 (0.2)	15 (5.9)	50.5 (19.9)
Average precipitation days (≥ 1.0 mm)	13	10	8	8	9	9	9	11	10	15	14	13	129
Average snowy days	8	8	2	0	0	0	0	0	0	0	1	6	25
Mean monthly sunshine hours	55.8	89.0	134.9	186.9	245.8	279.9	256.7	212.9	153.0	95.6	50.0	32.6	1,793.1
Source: , The Weather Network, Sunshine & Daylight Hours in Kristiansand

=== Popular beaches ===
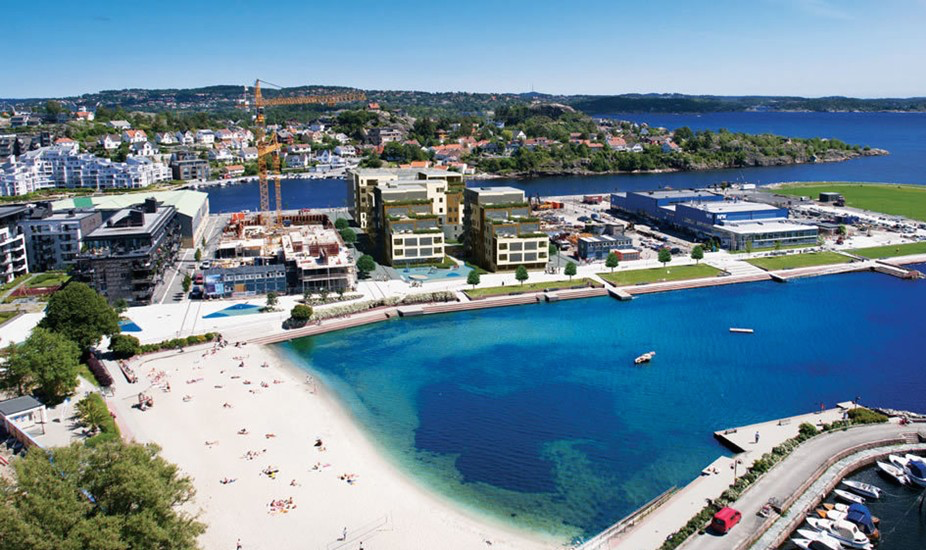
Bystranda

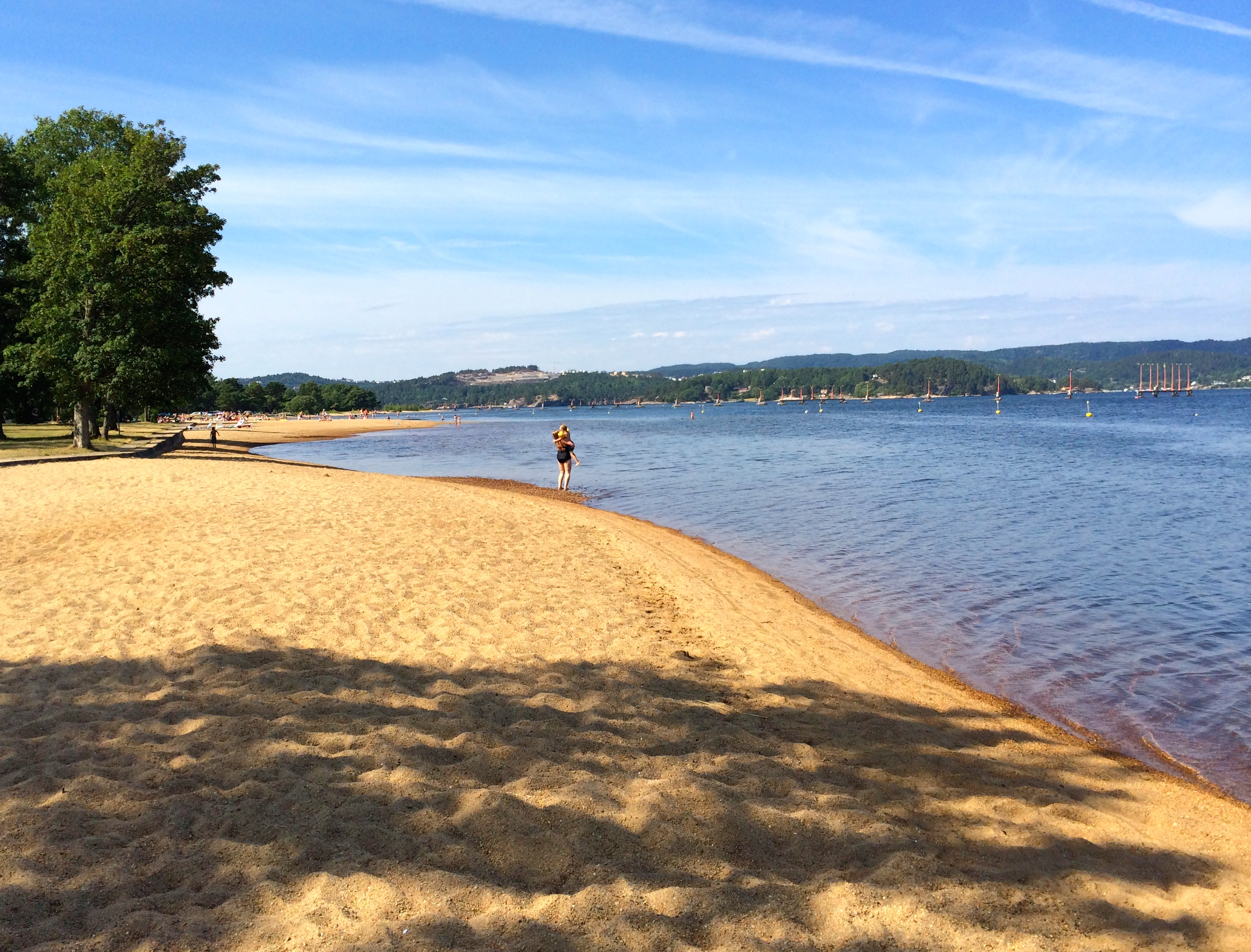
Hamresanden

- Bystranda is a beach located at the city centre. It is east on Kvadraturen and at Tangen. Nearby the beach is the swimming complex Aquarama with both outdoor and indoor pools. Aquarama is next door to the "Scandic Hotel Bystranda", which is Southern Norway's largest hotel. Some of Kristiansand's most expensive apartments are located east of the beach and near to Tangen. Some of Bystranda's facilities are beach volleyball, playgrounds, skateparks, stairs to the water at deeper ground and its easy design for handicapped people and children. In the middle of the bay, there is a sculpture in the water. Palmesus is a yearly beach festival held on Bystranda, it is Scandinavia's largest beach festival.
- Hamresanden is located between Hånes and the airport Kristiansand Airport, Kjevik. It is 3 km (2 mi) long which makes it the longest beach in Kristiansand. There are three camping places and an apartment hotel at the beach. The name comes from the nearby subpart Hamre.
- Sømstranda is a nudist beach in Kristiansand located at Søm.

=== Boroughs ===
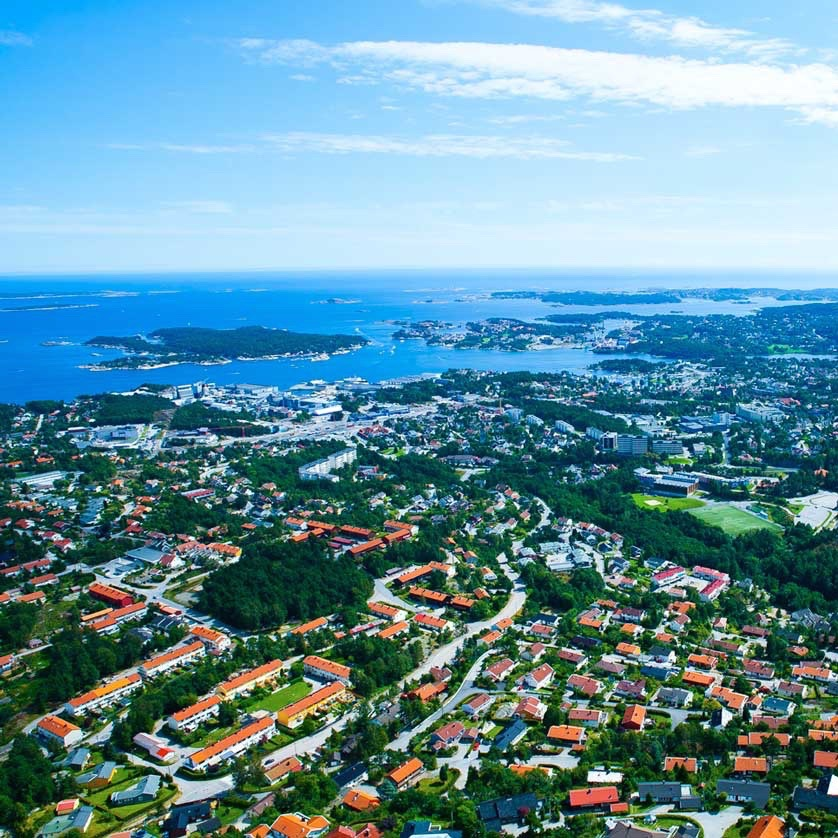
Vågsbygd

Kristiansand boroughs area (city-parts)
Nr	Boroughs	Parts	Population
1	Vågsbygd	Flekkerøy, Vågsbygd, Slettheia, Voiebyen	36,281
2	Grim	Grim, Hellemyr, Mosby, Strai, Tinnheia	16,020
3	Kvadraturen	Eg, Kvadraturen	5,200
4	Lund	Gimlekollen, Justvik, Lund, Ålefjær	30,830
5	Oddernes	Hånes, Randesund, Søm, Tveit	19,080
-	West	Vågsbygd, Grim, Kvadraturen	57,501
-	East	Lund, Randesund	49,910

=== Parts ===
Kristiansand parts area
Nr	Parts	Population
1	Flekkerøy	3,270
2	Voiebyen	6,520
3	Vågsbygd	22,000
4	Slettheia	4,460
5	Hellemyr	2,990
6	Tinnheia	3,880
7	Grim	5,200
8	Kvadraturen	5,200
9	Lund	10,950
10	Gimlekollen	5,750
11	Strai	1,860
12	Mosby	2,090
13	Justvik	2,770
14	Ålefjær	410
15	Tveit	2,980
16	Hånes	4,210
17	Søm	9,410
18	Randesund	2,480

Kristiansand is partitioned into 18 parts and 217 subparts. Kristiansand is also divided into 5 boroughs.

Kvadraturen is the city center of Kristiansand. The area belonged to the farms Eg and Grim, and was a sandy plain covered with forest, and was called Sanden or Grimsmoen. Settlements were before the city was founded focused on loading and dumps at Lund, along Otra or Torridalselven and along Topdalsfjorden by Odderøya and Flekkeroy port. Christian IV's town plan outlined the city center with 56 rectangular squares with five long blocks and eight cross streets. It was the squares along the Otra and east and west harbor, which was built first. Today Kvadraturen is a part of Kvadraturen/Eg, which has (as of 1 January 2005) 5510 inhabitants. The area Posebyen in Kvadraturen is Northern Europe's longest continuous wooden buildings. In the parts are among others Kristiansand Cathedral, Kristiansand City Hall, Wergeland Park, and the terminal for ferries to Hirtshals and Kristiansand Station is located in the parts western corner. Vågsbygd has considerable industry, who has survived major changes. The largest employer is all the same Elkem Solar producing super clean Silicon for solar cells, which are located in premises that Elkem previous Ferrosilicon factory Fiskå Verk. On Andøya it established a significant and advanced mechanical industry which produces offshore and marine cranes and other marine equipment in Andøya Industrial Park. Amfi Vågsbygd is a major shopping center in Vågsbygd. Outside of Andøya in Vågsbygd is Bredalsholmen Shipyard and Preservation Centre, a Centre for protection of vessels at the former Bredalsholmen yard. Bredalsholmen Shipyard and Preservation Centre is a national hub for maintenance of museum ships and cherish worthy coastal culture, and a drydock with considerable capacity.

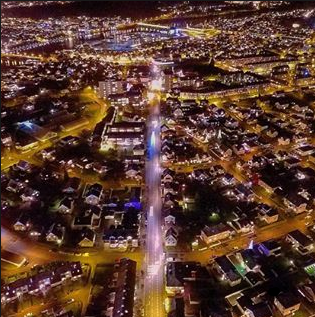
Streets of Lund during the night.

Lund is the second largest borough in Kristiansand with a population of 9,000 inhabitants in 2012. 14 June 1921 was the first 2.75 km^{2} of Lund transferred to Kristiansand and 1 January 1965 was also the rest of Lund part of Kristiansand in the municipal amalgamation. In Lund, there are traces of humans dating back to the early Iron Age, the Viking Age until the early Middle Ages various locations. There has been a settlement here since the Stone Age. During the Viking Age there was a great man's farm here. A Runestone at Oddernes church provides a connection to this farm. A large field with burial mounds formerly existed south and west of the church, and may also be associated with this farm. In 1492 robbers from the sea came and attacked Lund. This is mentioned in two letters located in the National Archives. The letters describe the attack that took place with a lot of violence against both women and men and that on both sides suffered casualties. No one knows who the robbers were, but their centurion was named Per Syvertsen. The name suggests that he and his crew came from Norway or Denmark.

Indre and Ytre Randesund is located between Kvåsefjorden in Høvåg and the Topdalsfjord in Oddernes. Several small islands are situated alongside the cost of Randesund, among them Randøya and Herøya, both popular with summer tourists. The municipality (originally the parish) is named after the island, Randøen (now known as Randøya). The first part of the name is rand (Old Norse: rǫnd) which means "boundary" or "edge" and the last part of the name is sund which means "strait". The name was previously spelled Randøsund.

Tveit is a village (and formerly part of Tveit Municipality). It is located in the eastern part of the present-day Kristiansand Municipality. Tveit is home to Kristiansand Airport, Kjevik. Tveit is located along the lower part of the Tovdalselva river, known as Topdalselva further north. The population of Tveit is approximately 2,900 (2014).

Artillerivollen is a part in the Grim borough

=== Subparts ===
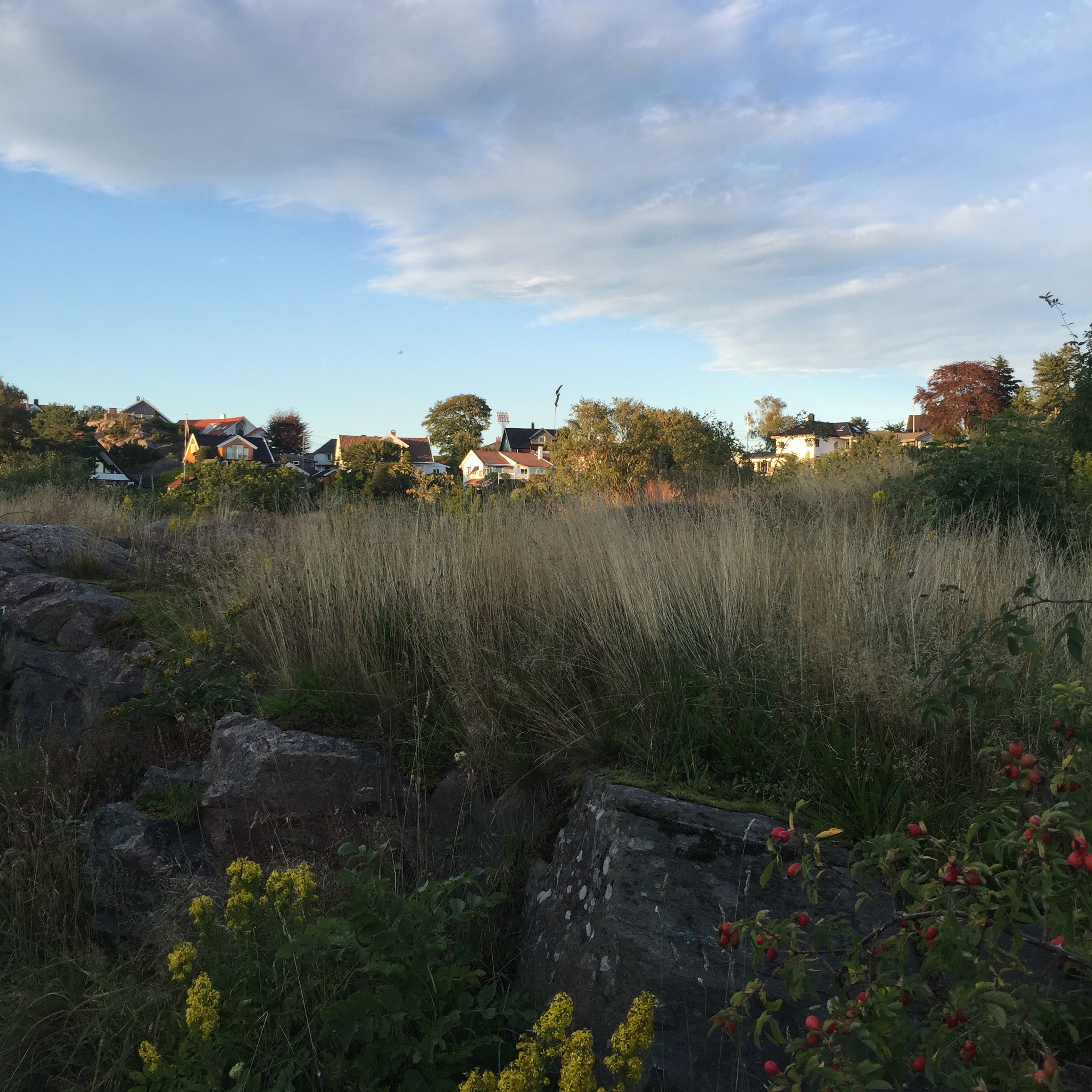
Kuholmen

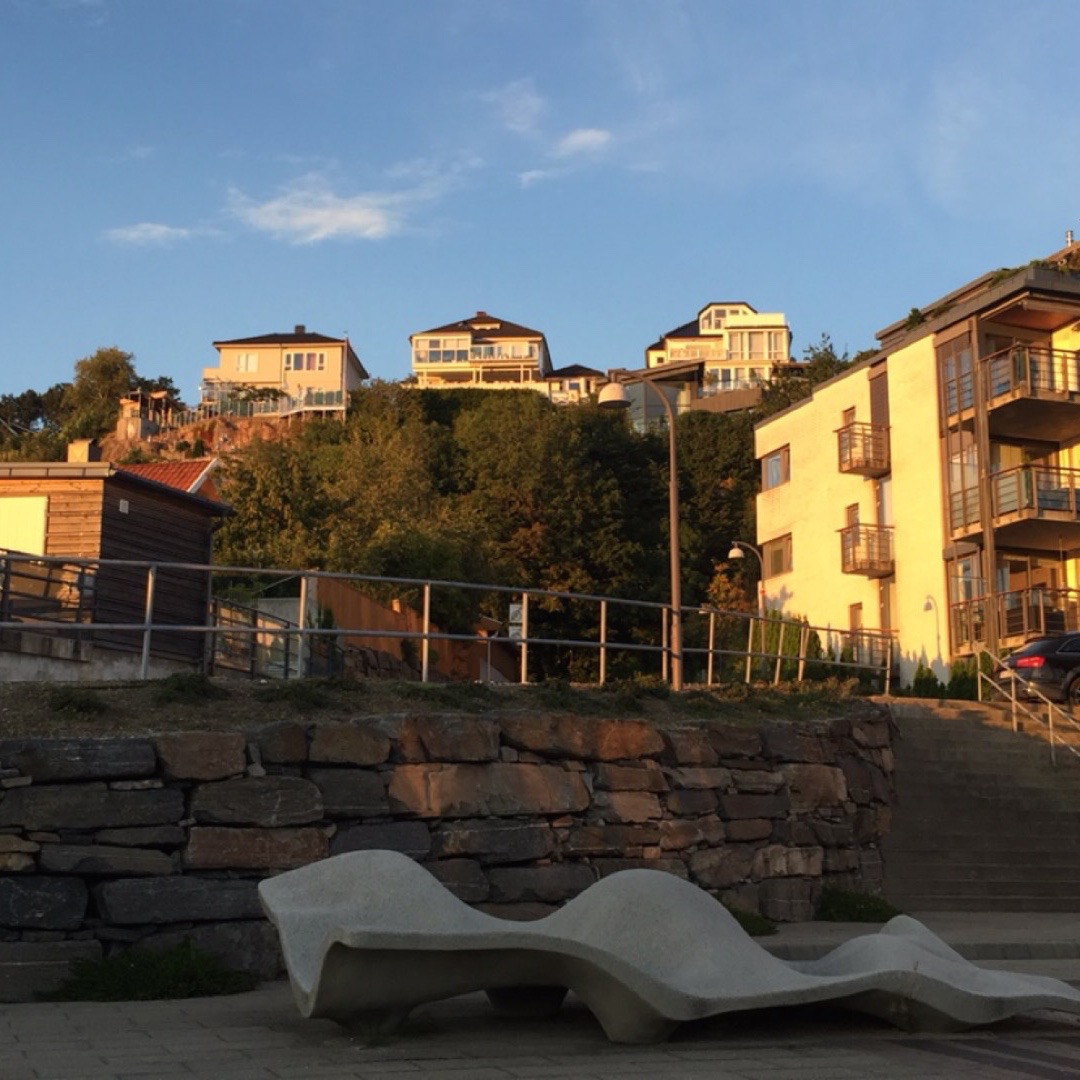
Hamreheia

Some of the most populous basic unions in the following boroughs:

Flekkerøy
- Berge
- Lindebø
- Mebø
- Skålevik
- Åshavn

Voiebyen

- Andøya
- Bråvann
- Kroodden
- Løvika
- Møvik
- Møviklia
- Rådyr
- Skutevika
- Spinneren
- Steindalen
- Ternevig
- Voie
- Voietun
- Voielia
- Voieåsen

Vågsbygd

- Augland
- Auglandsbukta
- Auglandskollen
- Auglandslia
- Bjørklia
- Furulia
- Granlia
- Kjerrheia
- Kjos Haveby
- Kjosneset
- Lumber
- Nordtjønnåsen
- Skyllingsheia
- Smiebrygga
- Storenes
- Vågsbygd sentrum
- Åsane

Slettheia

- Blørstad
- Fiskåtangen
- Gislemyr
- Gislemyrkollen
- Kartheia
- Karuss
- Rugde
- Slettheitoppen
- Trane
- Trekanten
- Øvre Slettheia

Hellemyr

- Breimyr
- Fidjemoen
- Fjellro
- Hellemyrtoppen
- Rige
- Solkollen
- Vestheiene

Tinnheia

- Eigevannskollen
- Hannevika
- Hannevikåsen
- Kobolt
- Kolsberg
- Kolsåsen
- Tinnheia sørvest
- Tinnheia torv
- Tinnheia nord

Grim

- Artillerivollen
- Bellevue
- Dalane
- Enrum
- Fagervoll
- Grim torv
- Grimsmyra
- Elisenhøy
- Idda
- Klappane
- Krossen
- Møllevann
- Paradis
- Suldalen

Kvadraturen

- Baneheia
- Byskogen
- Eg
- Eik
- Gravane
- Gyldengården
- Markens
- Nybyen
- Odderøya
- Posebyen
- Strandrponomaden
- Tangen

Lund

- Agder Allé
- Bertesbukta
- Freyasdalen
- Gimle
- Gimlemoen
- Gimlevang
- Hamreheia
- Høivold
- Kjøita
- Kuholmen
- Kongsgård Allé
- Louvisenlund
- Lund torv
- Marvika
- Narviga
- Oddemarka
- Prestevik
- Skaugo
- Steinkleiva
- Sødal
- Tobienborg
- Vallhalla
- Vige

Gimlekollen

- Fagerholt
- Gimlekollen midtre
- Gimlekollen vest
- Gimlekollen øst
- Hestnestangen
- Prestheia
- Tretjønn
- Vollevannet
- Volleåsen
- Vige
- Øvre Kongsgård

Strai

- Aukland
- Gangdalslia
- Haslevollen
- Kulia
- Sagebekk
- Straismoen
- Torridal
- Ytre Strai
- Øvre Strai

Mosby

- Hauslia
- Høie
- Høielia
- Høietun
- Kiledalen
- Lillefjell
- Ravnåsen
- Rismoen
- Saga
- Ytre Mosby
- Øvre Mosby

Justvik

- Gjustvik
- Havlimyra
- Justlia
- Justnes
- Jærnesheia
- Kvernhusheia
- Skinnerheia

Ålefjær

- Bjåvannet
- Einerhaven
- Kostøl
- Ålefjær

Søm

- Bliksheia
- Fuglevik
- Gudbrandslia
- Haumyrheia
- Kjellevik
- Knarrevik
- Korsvik
- Liane
- Nordlia
- Rona
- Saltbustad
- Strømme
- Sømslia
- Torsvik
- Torsvikkleiva
- Vardåsen

Tveit

- Brattvollshei
- Boen
- Drangsholt
- Dønnestad
- Foss
- Hamre
- Hamresanden
- Kråkebumoen
- Moneheia
- Ryen
- Solsletta
- Ve

Hånes

- Bjørndalen
- Brattbakken
- Grovikheia
- Heståsen
- Hånestangen
- Hånni
- Lauvåsen
- Nedre Hånes
- Nedre Timenes
- Ronsbukta
- Strømsdalen
- Timenes

Randesund

- Bjørkestøl
- Butangen
- Drange
- Drangeskauen
- Dvergsnes
- Eftevåg
- Fidje
- Frikstad
- Hestehagen
- Holte
- Kirkevik
- Kongshavn
- Kvarnes
- Lykkedrag
- Odderhei
- Rabbersvik
- Skaupemyr
- Sommerro
- Stangenes
- Tømmerstø
- Tømmeråsen
- Vadvik
- Vrånes

=== Notable streets ===
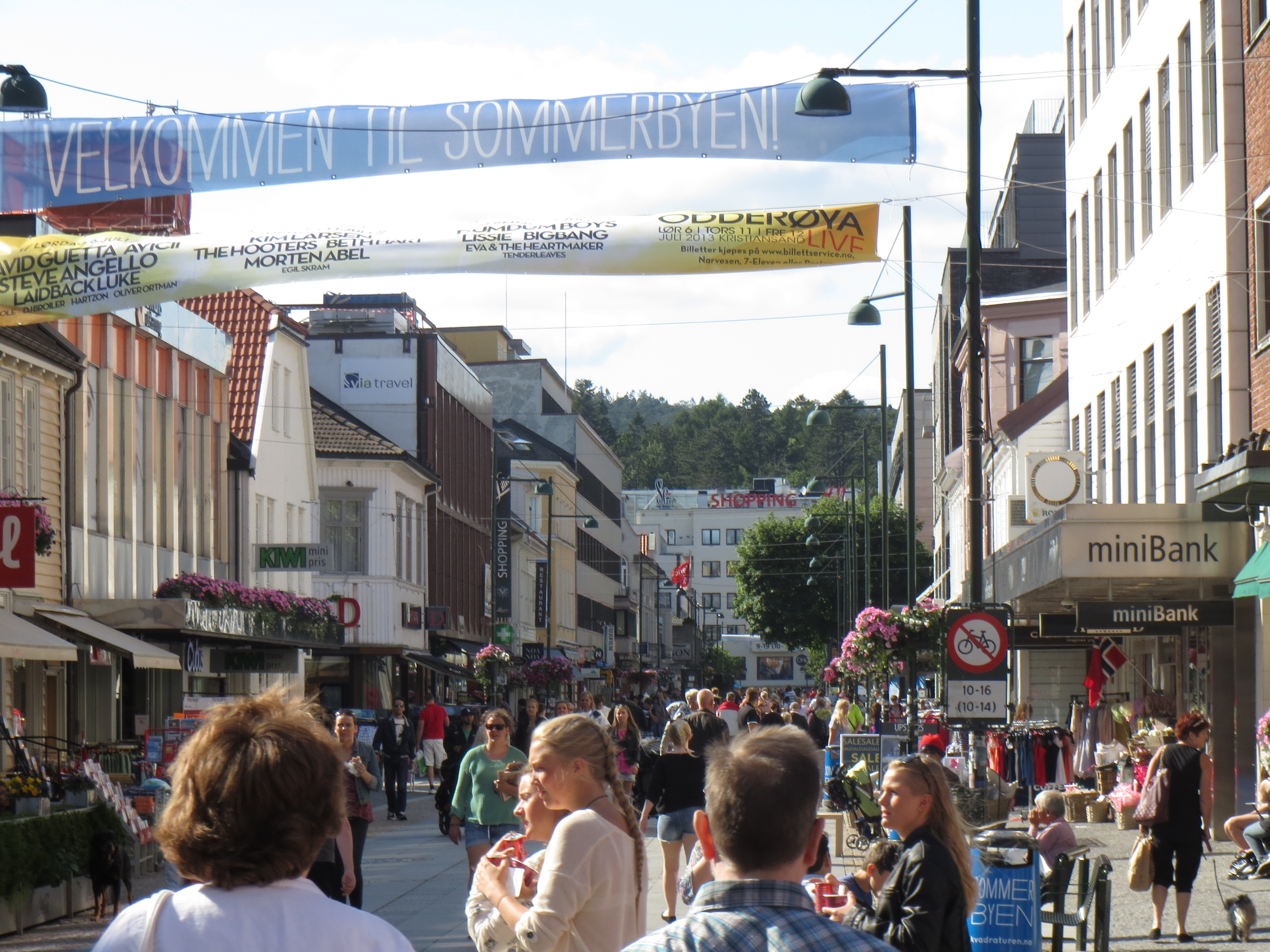
Markens Pedestrian Street

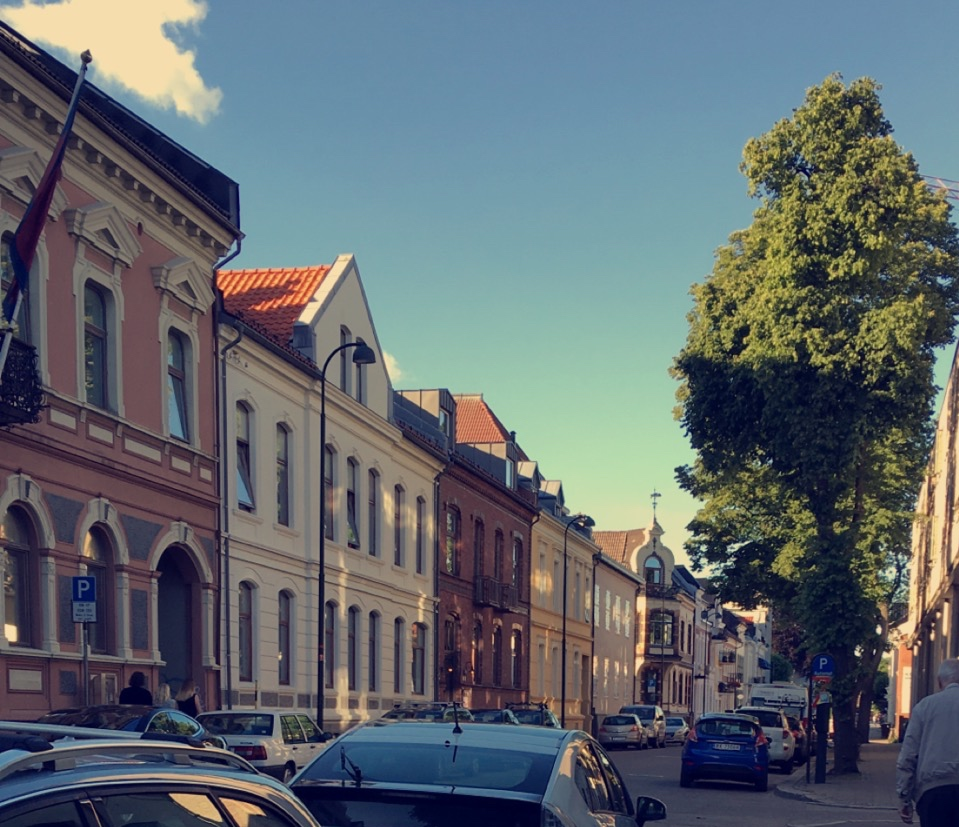
Kongens gate

The city of Kristiansand has several notable streets including:

- Dronningens gate (Queens street) is a street that has its run from Havnegata Vestre harbor to Lund Bridge and is 980 meters long. 86 properties are matrikulert to the street. The street had in the 1700s the name Sand Alley.
- Elvegata (River street) has its run from Østre Strandgate to Tordenskjolds gate. It has a mix of newer business and residential buildings schools and nursing homes as well as a large percentage of older residential buildings in wood and masonry. On the south side of Østre Strandgate called extension of Elvegata for Tangen. 70 meters of the street, in the quarter between Dronningens gate and Tollbodgata is designated county road 26.
- Festningsgata is a street in Kvadraturen. The name is connected with Christiansholm Fortress from 1672 located in the street race extension towards the east harbor. The street stretches from Østre Strandgate to Tordenskjoldsgate and originally had the name Northern gate. The extension of the street during north of Tordenskjolds street is named Stener Heyerdahl street. The park south of Tordenskjolds street called Stener Heyerdahl park. This street stump and Festningsgata from Tordenskjolds street to Dronningens gate is part of the county road 28. From Vestre Strandgata to Tollbodgata buildings are listed by the walled green was introduced immediately after the fire in 1892 and forward.
- Henrik Wergelands gate is a street in Kvadraturen in Kristiansand. The street has its run from Vestre Strandgate to Elvegata. 118 properties are matrikulert to the street. It had previously named Consumer Julia Street. The street is named in honor of Norwegian poet Henrik Wergeland. In 1808 he had his early childhood in the town until he at nine moved with her family to Eidsvold.
- Tollbodgata (Tollbooth street) has its run from Senior wharf at Vestre port to Elvegata by Otra and is identical with Route 27 in Vest-Agder. 77 properties are matrikulert to the street. The street has previously had the name Sten Alley. Tolbooth.
- Vestre Strandgate (Western Beach Street) is a street that has its run from Gravane to roundabout at Gartnerløkka where it meets E18 and continue to run in Rv9 (Setesdalsveien). It is part of the county road 471 from the roundabout at Gartnerløkka the junction with Dronnings gata. From Rådhusgata to Gravane has two parallel paths, an extension of Fv471 and a container that separates the harbor from including Tolbooth. The street has a number of key meeting places and city functions in terms of Radisson Hotel, Agder Theater, cinema, Clarion Hotel, Kristiansand Bus Terminal and Kristiansand Station. The street is characterized by restaurants, pubs and eating places, a number of shops and offices and a few apartments.

== Government ==
In Norway, municipalities are the unit of local government. This means that cities and towns are simply designations for urban areas, but under current Norwegian law, they have no actual government authority. The city of Kristiansand lies within Kristiansand Municipality and is therefore governed by the municipal council of Kristiansand Municipality.

== Demographics ==
Minority populations in Kristiansand by country of origin as of 1 January 2013
Rank	Ancestry	Number
1	Poland	1,940
2	Vietnam	1,890
3	Iraq	1,390
4	Chile	1,300
5	Kosovo	1,280
6	Denmark	1,160
7	Somalia	1,070
8	Bosnia and Herzegovina	940
9	Germany	880
10	Afghanistan	880
11	Russia	840
12	Iran	790
13	Sweden	700
14	Pakistan	550
15	Eritrea	540
16	United Kingdom	500
17	United States	420
18	Thailand	390
19	Iceland	390
20	Turkey	380
21	Palestine	360
22	Philippines	350
23	Syria	320
24	Ethiopia	330
25	Lithuania	320
26	Cambodia	320
27	Other countries	5,880

Kristiansand has the third largest Vietnamese community in Norway.

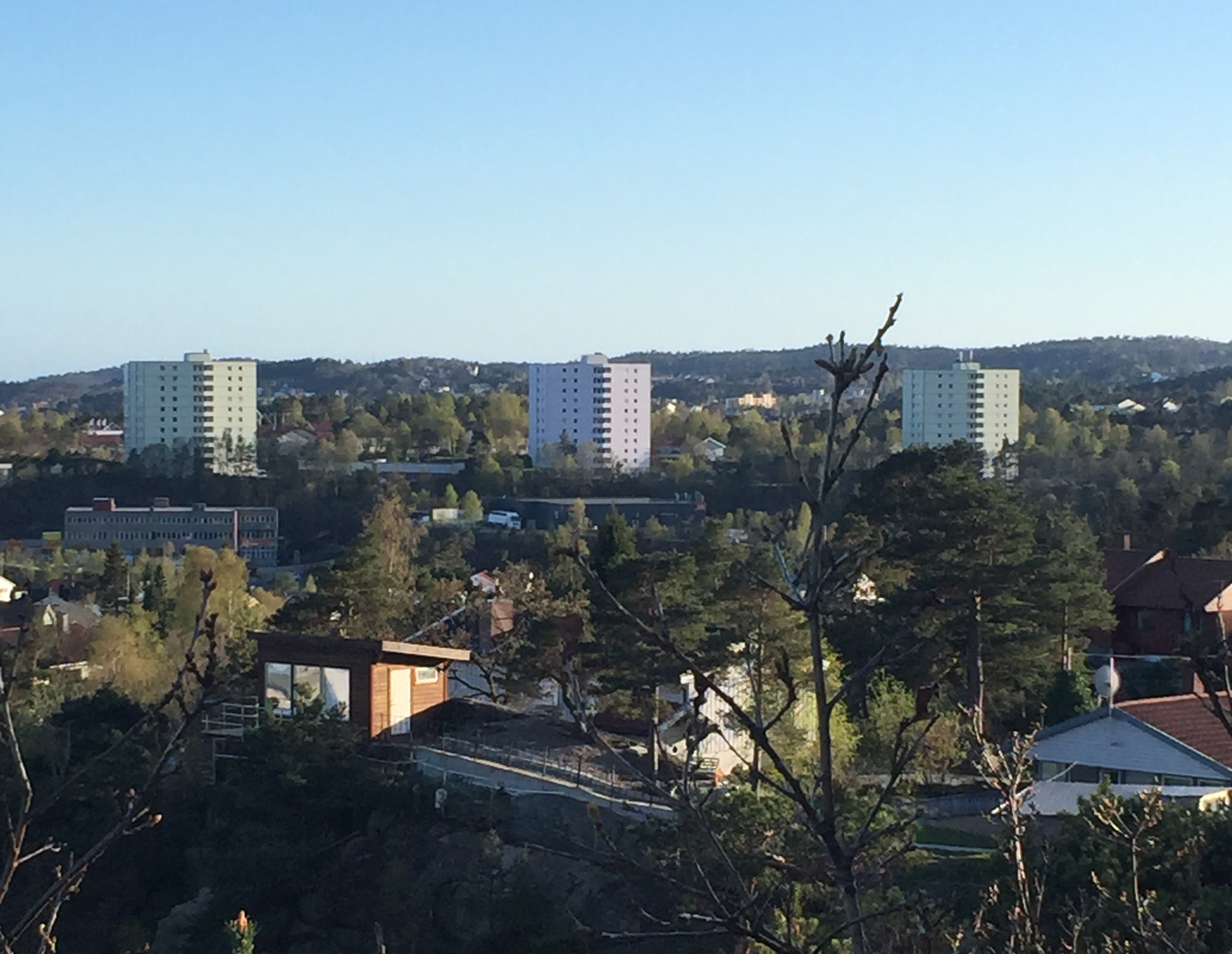
Slettheia has most immigrants in Kristiansand

The five districts with the highest proportion of immigrants
Nr	District	Percent
1	Slettheia	36%
2	Kvadraturen	24%
3	Grim	22%
4	Hellemyr	20%
5	Tinnheia	19%

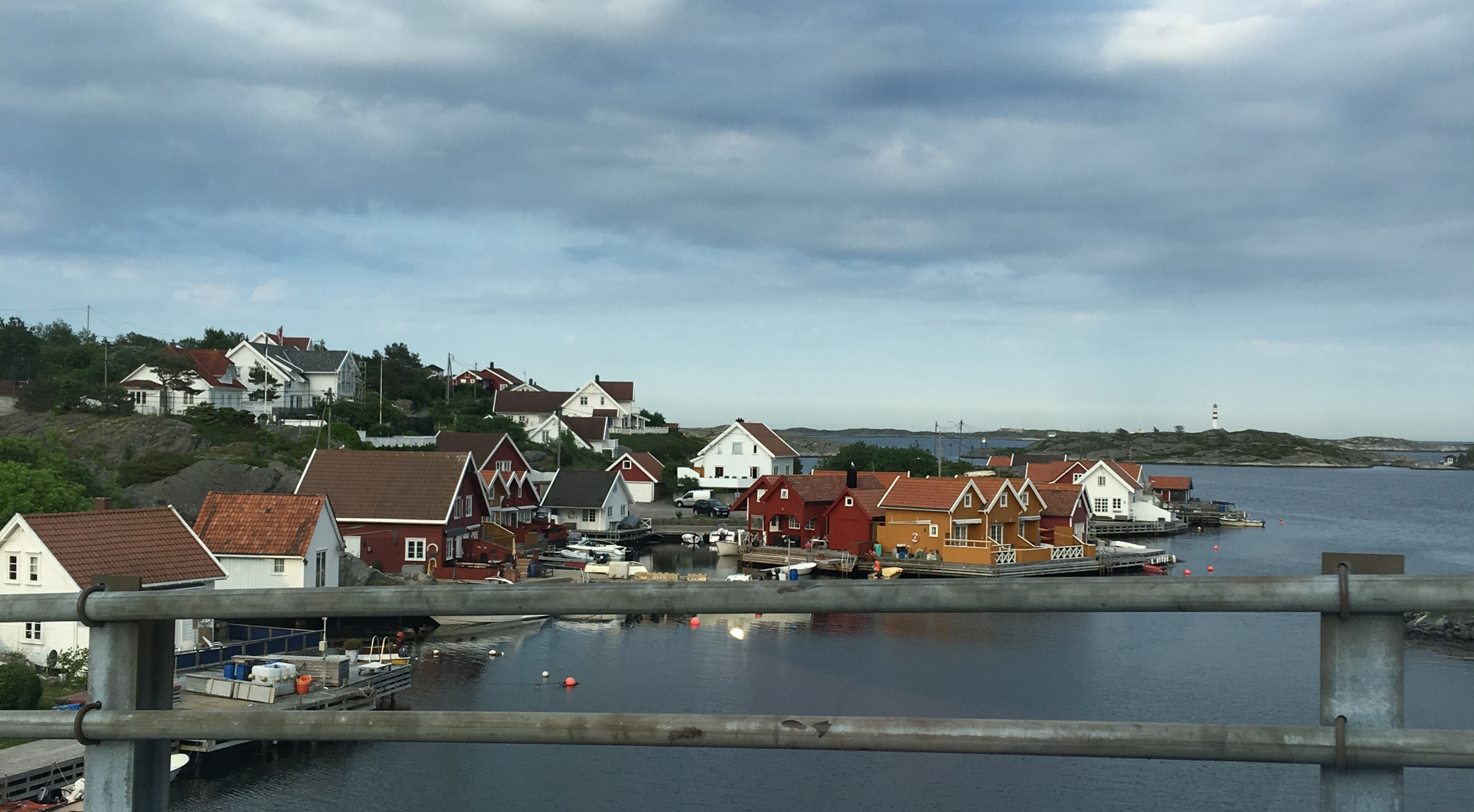
Flekkerøy has fewest immigrants, but the most Christians

The five districts with the lowest proportion of immigrants
Nr	District	Percent
1	Flekkerøy	7%
2	Randesund	7%
3	Gimlekollen	8%
4	Søm	10%
5	Tveit	10%

=== Religion ===
Kristiansand Cathedral, rebuilt in brick in 1885 after several fires ravaged the city in the 19th century

==== Christianity ====
Kristiansand Cathedral is the largest church in Kristiansand. It is located in Kvadraturen with the town hall and Wergelandsparken. The church was built in 1885 and have the capacity of 1500 people. The church is the seat of the Bishop of Agder and Telemark in the Church of Norway. Grim Church was built in 1969 and has a capacity of 750 people. Vågsbygd Church is the church of Vågsbygd, it is located in the centrum of Vågsbygd and was built in 1967 and has a capacity of 650. Lund Church was built in 1987 and has a capacity of 600 people. Søm Church was built in 2004 and has a capacity of 600. The church was Kristiansand municipality 1000 year building and is the largest church in Oddernes. The windows of Søm Church was designed by Kjell Nupen.

There are also churches located at Flekkerøy, Hellemyr, Hånes, Justvik, Oddemarka (Oddernes), Randesund, Strai (Torridal), Tveit and Voie. There are chapeaus all over the city. Christianity is strongest in Flekkerøy and Søm, even though Southern Norway is called the Norwegian Bible belt, Christianity doesn't play a big part in the rest of the city.

There is a Catholic church in Kvadraturen, St. Ansgar's Church. At Slettheia, there is a Latter-day Saint church and at Tinnheia, there is an Orthodox church.

The Church of Norway has twelve parishes (sokn) within the city of Kristiansand. It is part of the Kristiansand arch-deanery in the Diocese of Agder og Telemark.

Churches in the city of Kristiansand
Parish (Sokn)	Church Name	Location of the Church	Year built
Kristiansand domkirke	Kristiansand Cathedral	Kvadraturen	1884
Flekkerøy	Flekkerøy Church	Flekkerøya	1960
Grim	Grim Church	Grim	1969
Hellemyr	Hellemyr Church	Hellemyr	1988
Hånes	Hånes Church	Hånes	1986
Lund	Lund Church	Lund	1987
Oddernes	Justvik Church	Justvik	1985
Oddernes	Oddernes Church	Oddernes	c. 1040
Randesund	Randesund Church	Randesund	1864
Randesund	Søm Church	Søm	2004
Torridal	Torridal Church	Augland	1978
Tveit	Tveit Church	Tveit	c. 1100
Voie	Voie Church	Voie	1990
Vågsbygd	Vågsbygd Church	Vågsbygd	1967

==== Buddhism ====
There is a Buddhist centre in Vågsbygd with Ternevig. There is also a Buddhist meditation centre located in the neighbouring municipality Songdalen.

==== Islam ====
There is a mosque in Kvadraturen.

== Economy ==
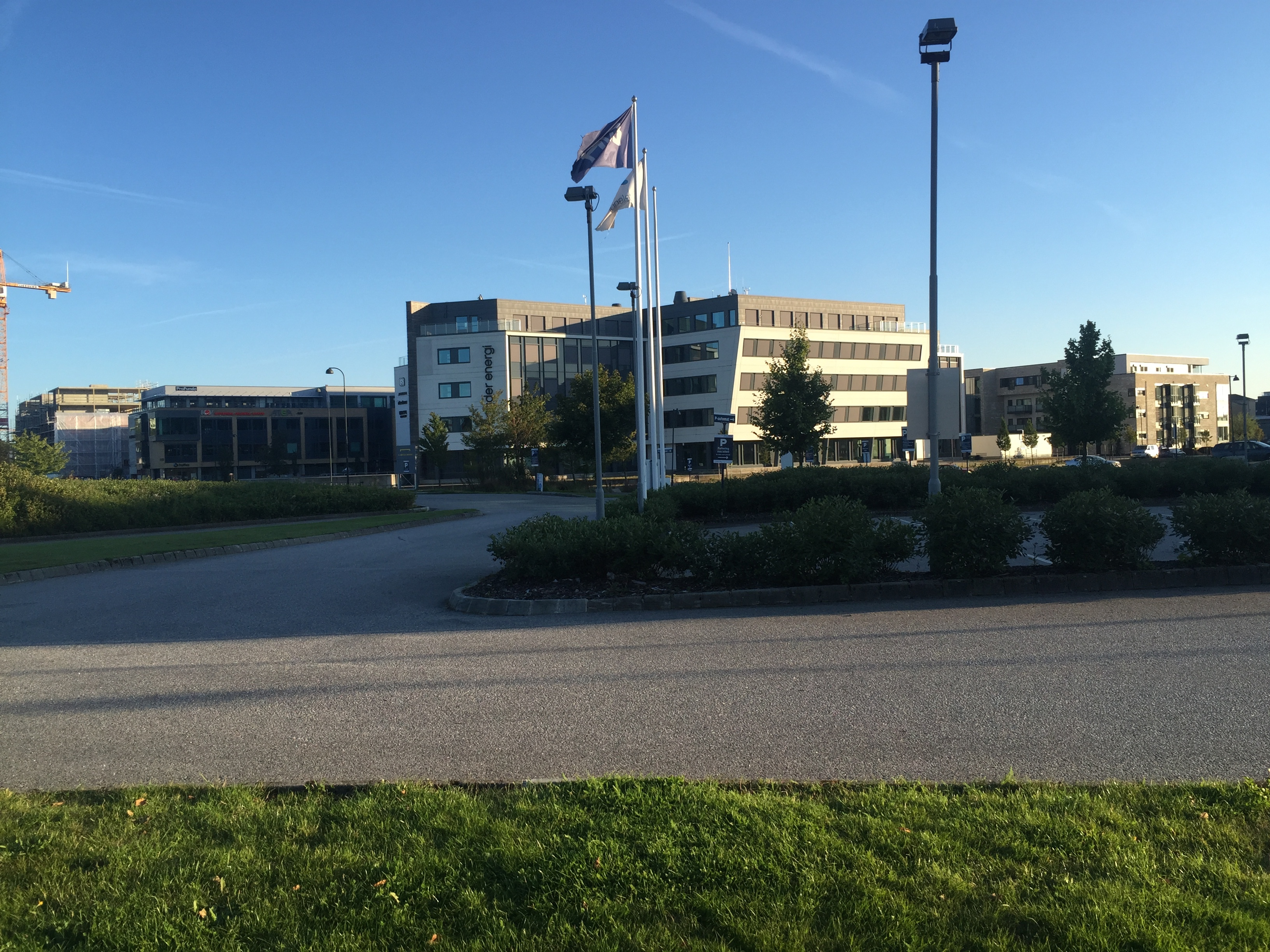
Kjøita Park

Christianssands Bryggeri is a producer of beer and soft drinks with a long history in the city. The brewery was established in 1859, and all products are made with spring water from the company's own spring, called Christian IVs kilde (Christian IV's spring).

Hennig-Olsen is an ice cream factory with headquarters and manufacturing facilities in Kristiansand. The factory opened in 1960, but the Hennig-Olsen family has produced ice cream in Kristiansand since 1924, when Sven Hennig-Olsen started doing so in the back of his tobacco kiosk.

Glencore Nikkelverk (nickel factory) was founded in 1910 as Kristiansand Nikkelraffineringsverk A/S. The company is owned by the Anglo-Swiss company Glencore and has about 500 employees.

The Korsvik industrial area on the east side of the Kristiansandsfjord is home to companies working on drilling technology, cranes, winches and other equipment for the worldwide petroleum industry, among them National Oilwell Varco and Aker MH. Elkem, owned by China National Bluestar since 2011, operated a refining plant for ferrosilicon and microsilica at Fiskå in Vågsbygd for many years and was replaced in the beginning of the 20th century by Elkem Solar which produces polycrystalline silicon for wafers used in the solar cell industry. It has about 225 employees.

Sørlandschips is a Norwegian produced potato chip brand. The potatoes often come from Denmark. Sørlandschips owned by Scandza AS and is one of Norway's most popular potato chip brands today. It has a variety of tastes and spices.

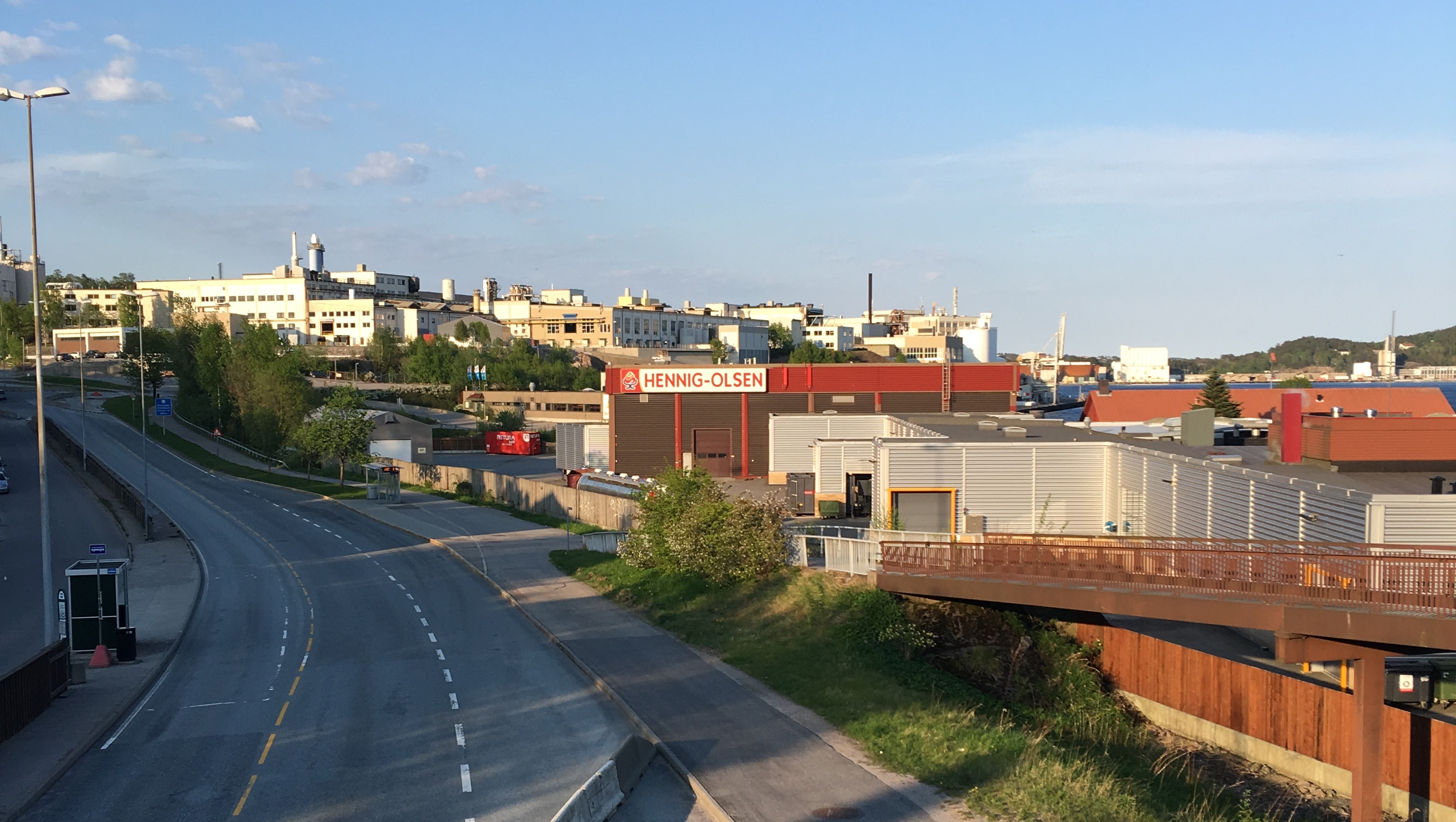
Hannevika with Hennig-Olsen Iskremfabrikk

Dampbageriet is a large bakery chain based in Vest-Agder, it was established in Kristiansand in 1862 and has 4 stores in Kristiansand.

Sparebanken Sør is a savings bank serving Vest-Agder, Aust-Agder and Telemark. It was established in 1824 when Christiansand Sparebank opened up, it was one of the first in Norway.

Hennig-Olsen Iskremfabrikk is a major Norwegian ice-cream company based and started up in Kristiansand. The factory is located in Hannevika.

As a relatively large shipping town, Kristiansand was a profitable location for shipbuilders Kristiansands Mekaniske Verksted and P. Høivolds Mekaniske Verksted. At one time, shipping companies were the backbone of the local economy, but not many survive. The Rasmussen Group, previously a shipping firm, is now an investment company. Kristiansand continues to have major shipbuilding and repair facilities that support Norway's North Sea oil industry. The static inverter plant of the HVDC Cross-Skagerrak is located near Kristiansand.

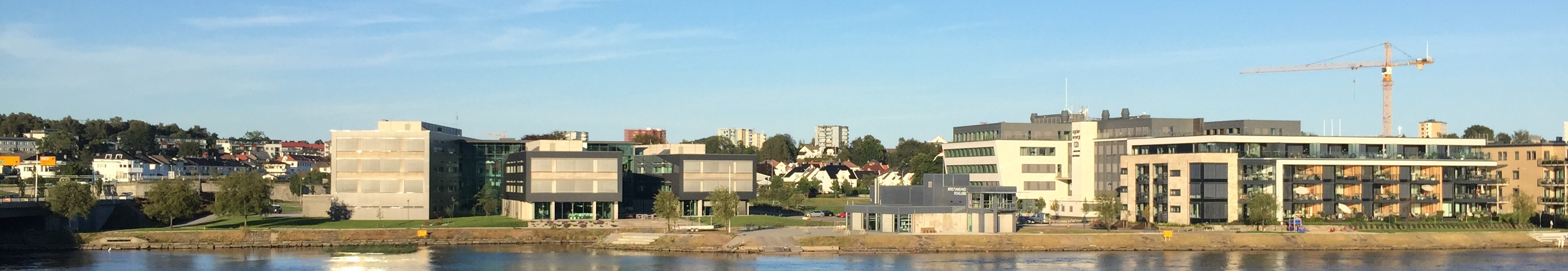
Kjøita Park with Telenor main offices for Southern Norway to the left and Kristiansand Roklubb in the center and apartments to the right

=== Sørlandsparken ===
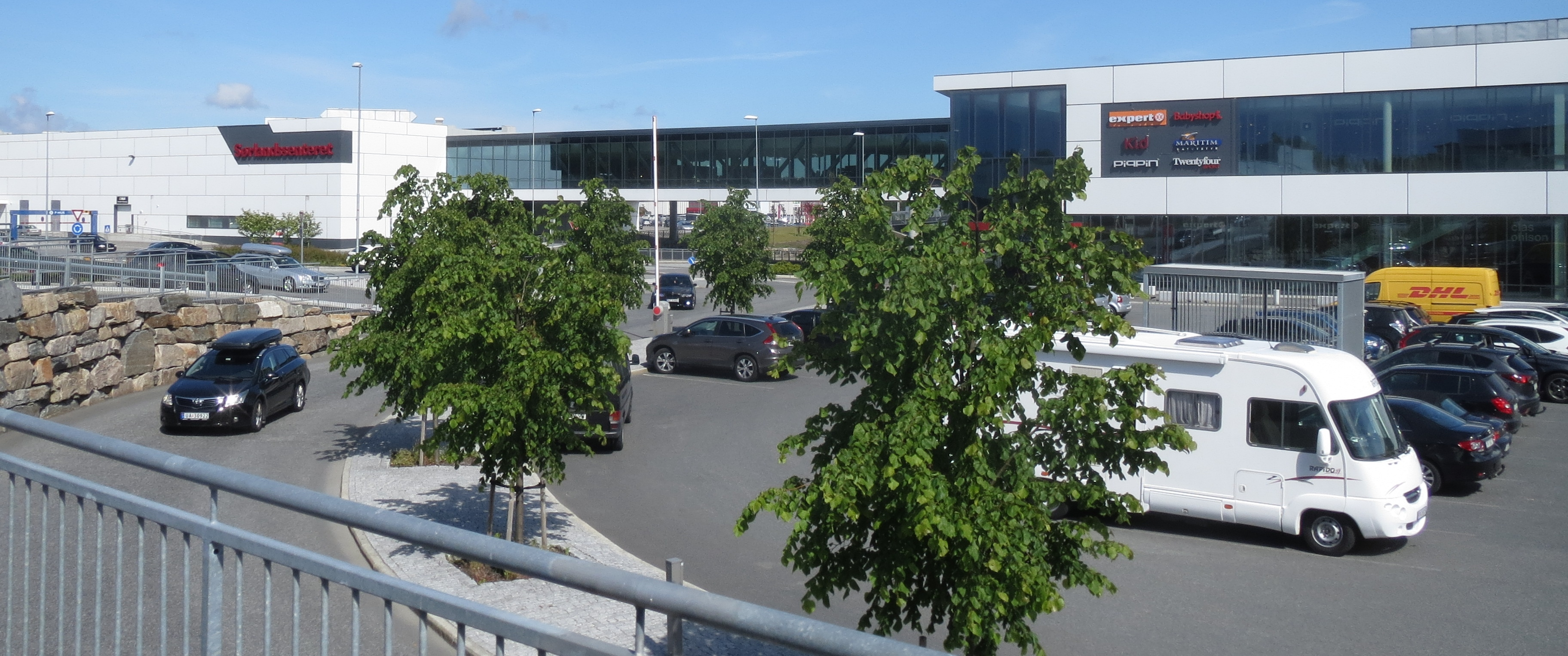
Sørlandssenteret is Norway's largest mall

Sørlandsparken (The Southern Norway Park) is an industrial shopping park outside of Kristiansand city in the municipality. The park is also located 17 kilometres (11 mi) from Lillesand. The park has an area of 670,000 m^{2} (7,211,820 sq ft) and over 5,000 workplaces.

The main part of the industrial park is in Kristiansand, including the mall Sørlandssenteret with 195 stores and Kristiansand Zoo, it is the largest mall and zoo in Norway. The racetrack of Southern Norway is also located in Kristiansand while IKEA is located technically in Lillesand municipality.

Others large chainstores is also located around the mall.

There are two hotels located in Sørlandsparken and some resorts nearby the zoo.

E18 goes past Sørlandsparken before continuing to downtown Kristiansand. Buses are available 6-8 times in the hours all day.

== Culture ==
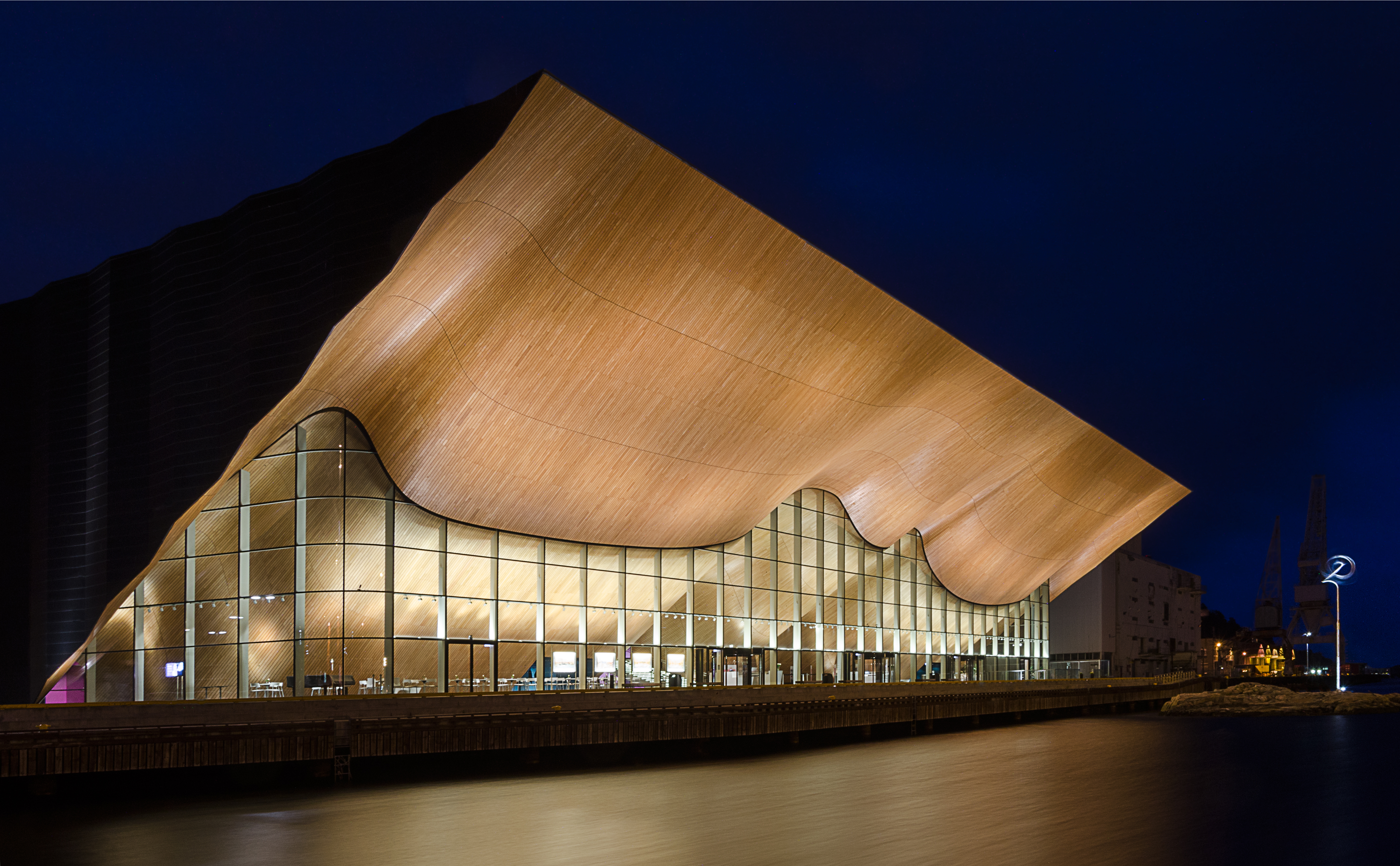
Kilden Performing Arts Centre

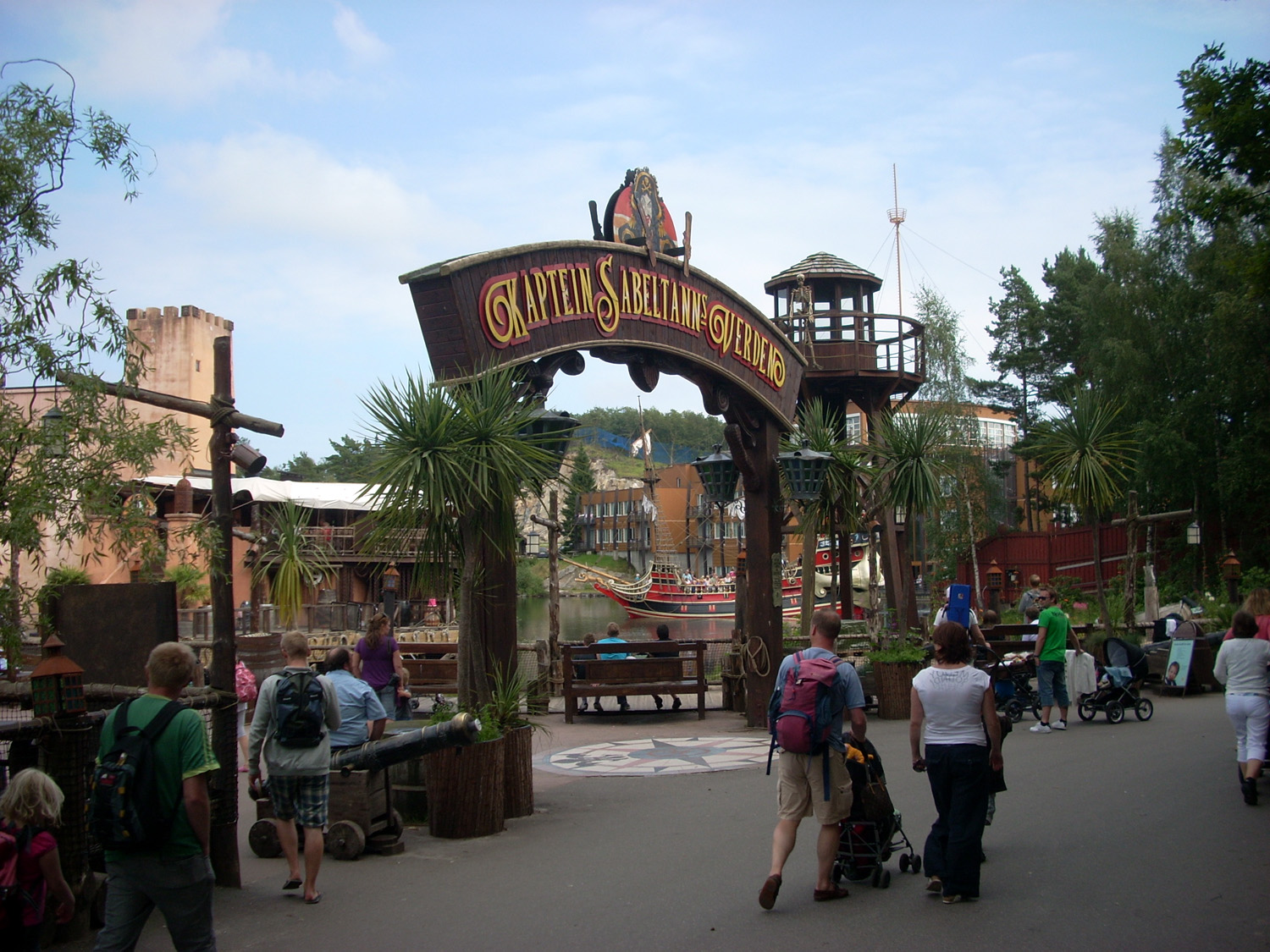
Kaptein Sabeltann world in Kristiansand Zoo and Amusement Park

The Kristiansand Symphony Orchestra, Chamber Orchestra and Wind Ensemble merged in 2003. The orchestra now performs at the Kilden Performing Arts Centre, which opened in January 2012. This is also the new home of Agder Theatre, founded in 1991.

Sørlandets Art Museum is in the centre of Kristiansand, in the former buildings of the cathedral school. It was established in 1995 building on the former collection of Christiansands billedgalleri, and is the second-largest regional art museum in Norway. It includes both fine art and crafts and runs an extensive programme of activities that includes exhibitions of the permanent collection, temporary exhibitions of contemporary art, and touring exhibitions to schools and child-care facilities.

Christianssands Kunstforening, now renamed Kristiansand Kunsthall, is one of the oldest and largest art associations in Norway, founded in 1881, and has approximately 650 square metres (7,000 sq ft) of exhibition space for contemporary art in central Kristiansand. The association began assembling a permanent collection in 1902; this is now housed in Sørlandets Art Museum.

Cultiva, a local foundation, was established to ensure a portion of the profits made from selling shares in Agder Energy Ltd have lasting benefits to the community, focusing on art, culture, creativity and building competence; it supported projects in Kristiansand until the financial crisis forced cut-backs in 2011. In addition the Norwegian Directorate for Cultural Heritage endowed a cultural free port, Porto Rico, as one of the pilot projects of its "value creation project" in the 2000s.

In 2007 Kristiansand was awarded the designation Norges kulturkommune (Norway's culture municipality), a distinction awarded every other year by the Norwegian Culture Forum.

Fiskebrygga is a former fish landing on either side of the Gravane Canal, which separates the city centre from Odderøya; it was refurbished in the 1990s and now has wood-fronted buildings housing restaurants and shops including a fish market. It is very popular in summer, when the canal is also heavily used by boats.

The island of Odderøya is a former fortress and quarantine station, now used for recreation and excursion purposes. At times there are also concerts and festivals on the island.

The municipality millennium is Tresse - Retranchement, the city party space in front of Christiansholm Fortress, bottom Festningsgata the Baltic Sea. The millennium was celebrated here include a large sign. A small sign to mark the Millennium for the future are made, but per. 2011 not installed in anticipation of the festival grounds shall be given a facelift. It should also dug a channel within the fortress, so this again is left on an island. These projects are waiting for political consideration and funding. Tusenårstreet were planted on the lawn between the festival grounds and playground/ice rink in Tresse.

== Sport ==
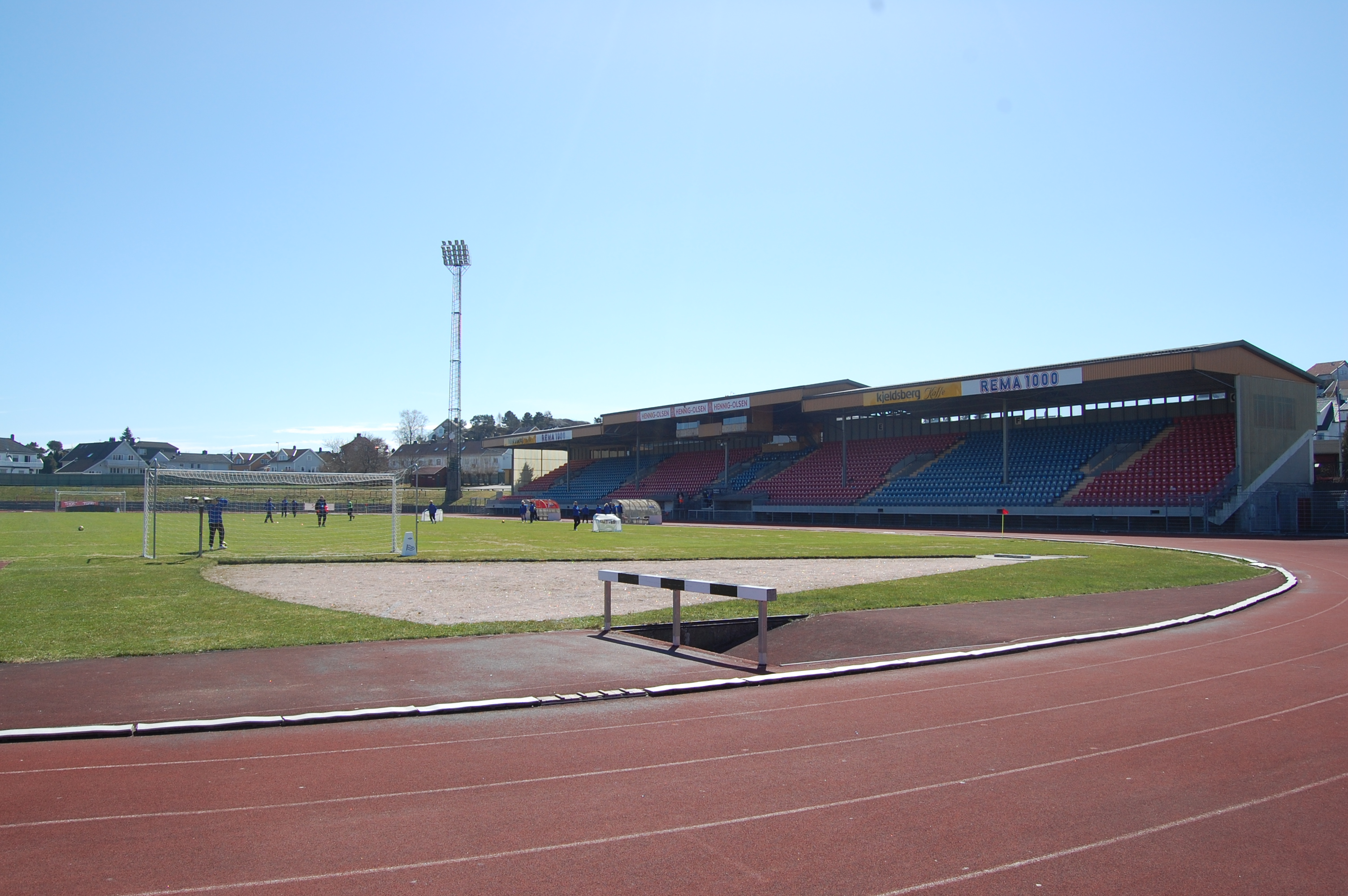
Kristiansand Stadion

The city's best known football team, IK Start, moved in 2007 to a new home stadium, Sør Arena. The city is also home to other football teams, including Flekkerøy IL, FK Vigør, IK Våg, and FK Donn.

Kristiansand is also known for its handball teams (Kristiansands IF and Vipers Kristiansand), ice hockey (Kristiansand Ishockeyklubb), basketball (Kristiansand Pirates) and volleyball (Grim VBK) clubs and has a baseball team (Kristiansand Suns).

The Idda Arena (opened on 3 September 2011) is a multi-purpose hall that consists of ice hockey, curling, a sports hall, martial arts, fencing dance and a gym. Adjacent to the Arena, is a skate park and football pitch. It replaced the Idda Idrettsplassen, an outdoor sports field used for skating, football (first used in 1924) and athletics.

Kristiansand Stadion is a multi-use stadium and former ground of IK Start, the stadium hosted important athletics competitions.

Motorcycle speedway has had a long association with the city, covering three venues. The Norwegian Championship was held at Idda Idrettsplassen in 1960 and a semi final was held at the Kristiansand Stadion in 1964. Much later a new venue Sørlandsparken Speedwaybane was built by the speedway club NMK Kristiansand, out of the city, west in Sørlandsparken, off Skibåsen. This has since held the Norwegian Championships in 2012 and 2016.

== Tourism ==
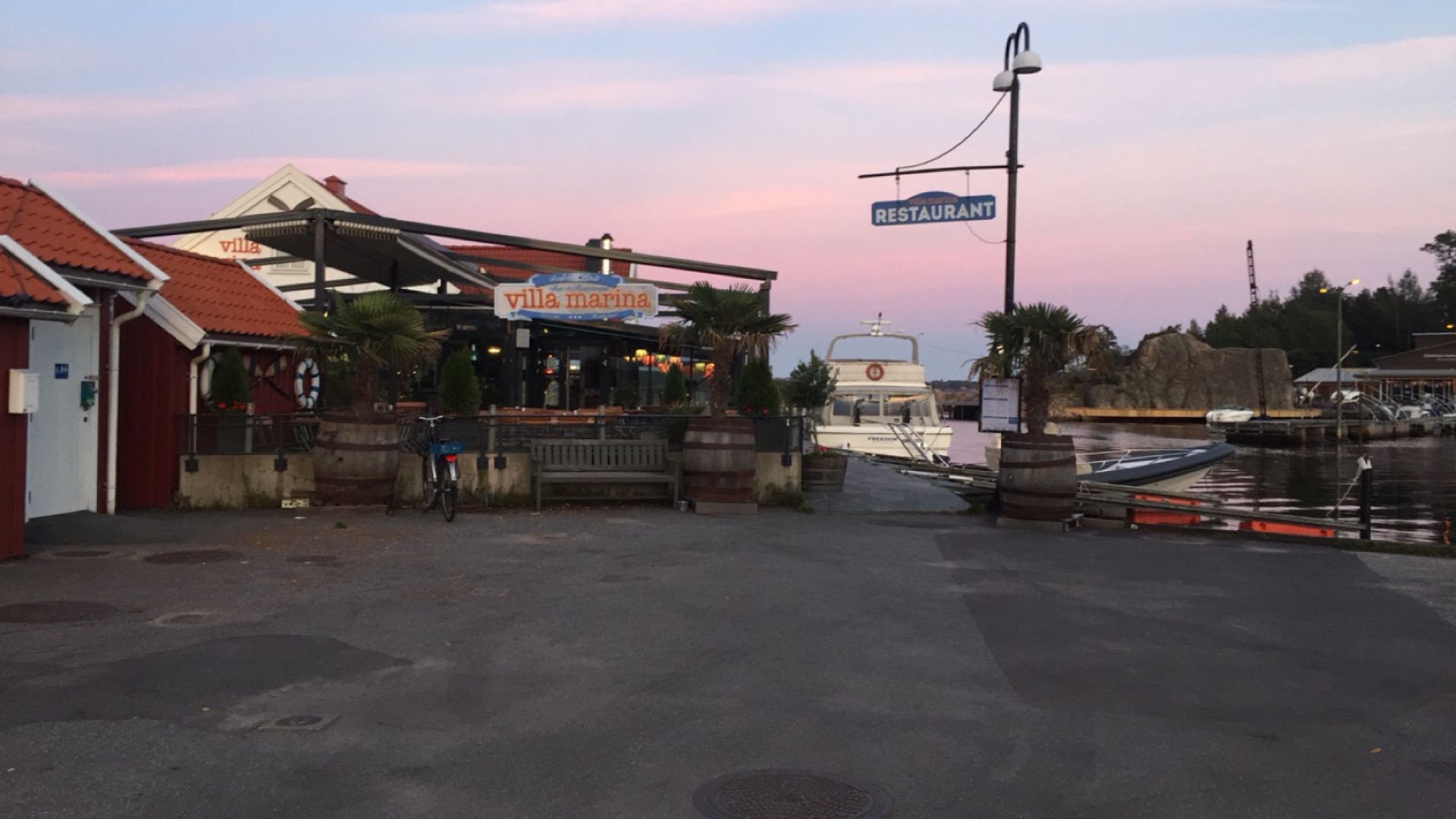
Kristiansand Marina

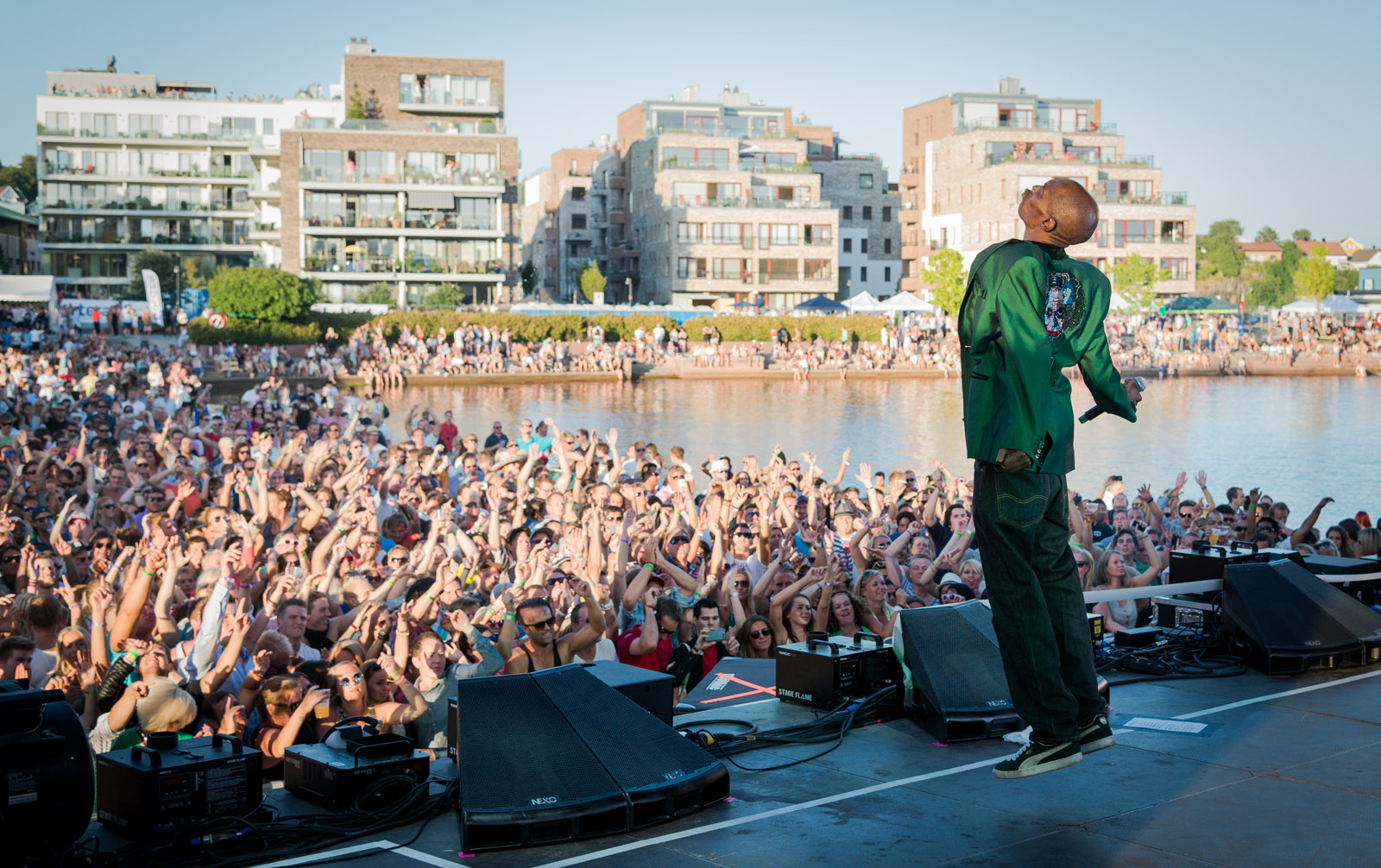
Faithless in concert at Palmesus, Scandinavia's largest beach festival

Kristiansand is a summer tourist destination, attracting many visitors in particular to its zoo, Kristiansand Zoo and Amusement Park, just east of the city. This is the second most visited attraction in Norway, after Holmenkollen, and had 925,000 visitors in 2012. Its animals, most of which are housed in natural habitats, include wolves, tigers, lions and the lynx. The zoo is open 365 days a year, while the amusement park is open during the summer season only.

The Quart festival was an annual music festival that took place in Kristiansand over five days in early July. There were large stages on Odderøya and smaller venues around the city. Founded in 1991 as Qvadradurmusivalen, the festival changed its name to the more catchy Quart Festival the following year. It included internationally known performers and was also known for booking acts that later became internationally known. For several years it was the largest music festival in Norway, but beginning in summer 2007 it was challenged by the Hovefestivalen on Tromøya in Arendal Municipality, and some Oslo-based festivals. In early June 2008 the organization declared bankruptcy; the festival returned in 2009 under the name Quart, but again went bankrupt.

Kristiansand is home to many other festivals as well, running throughout the year. Protestfestival, held in September, was launched in 2000 and aims to address apathy and indifference in politics, and includes debates, concerts and lectures combined with performance art and documentaries. Protestfestival claims to attract anarchists, communists, hippies as well as conservative Christians and capitalists and to encourage communication among these radically different groups. Others include Southern Discomfort, also in September, the Bragdøya Blues Festival in June, the Dark Season Festival in October, and Cultural Night and the International Children's Film Festival in April.

== Crime ==
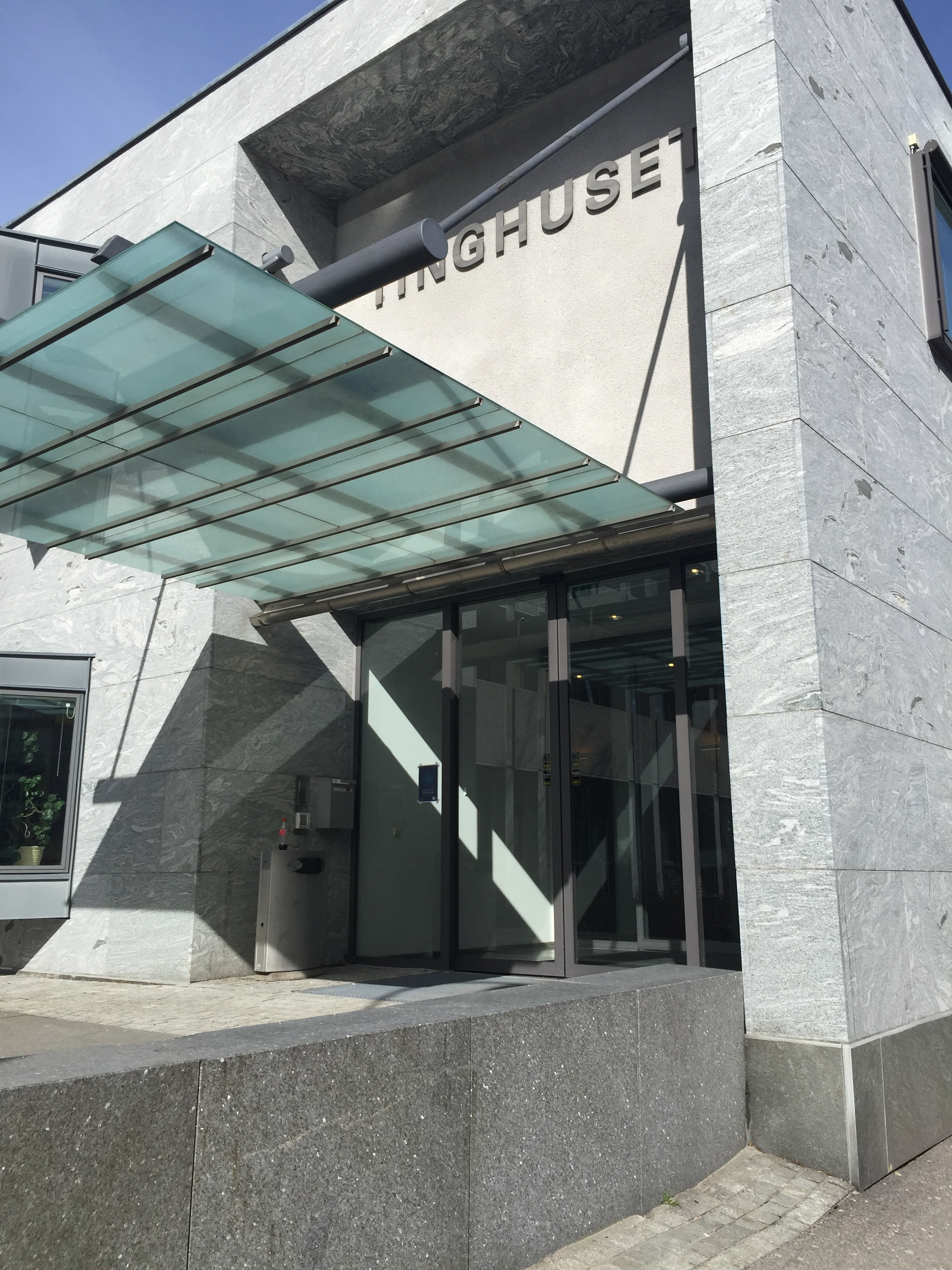
Courthouse in Kristiansand

Kristiansand has three police stations. The one in the city center, the main one for Southern Norway, Agder Police District. While on less serious crimes only covers some these parts of Kristiansand, Kvadraturen, Grim and Lund. Vågsbygd police station covers the Vågsbygd district while Randesund police station covers Randesund, Søm, Hånes and Tveit.

Most crim-cases reported in Kristiansand takes place on Kvadraturen. In south of Markens gate with Tollbodgata and Dronningens gate which host stores that are open 24 hours as well as many nightclubs. In 2014 it was most reported cases there in the entire city.

There were over 56 cases reported in this area and 123 on Kvadraturen in 2013, a decrease from 150 cases in 2012 reported on Kvadraturen. In the Vågsbygd police district it was reported that there were over 50 cases, going down 27% since 2012. At Randesund police station it was 61 cases reported, so had gone down 9% from 2012 to 2013. Outside of Kvadraturen, Vågsbygd and Randesund there were 110 cases reported in the municipality, mostly from Grim.

As of 2014, there were over 350 cases reported for all of Kristiansand. Of these, 34% were committed by minors on Kvadraturen. Most cases on Kvadraturen are narcotics, violence and nonprofit crimes; the majority being shop lifting. Six of the violent crime cases were against police and most violent acts were performed with knives.

=== Minors ===
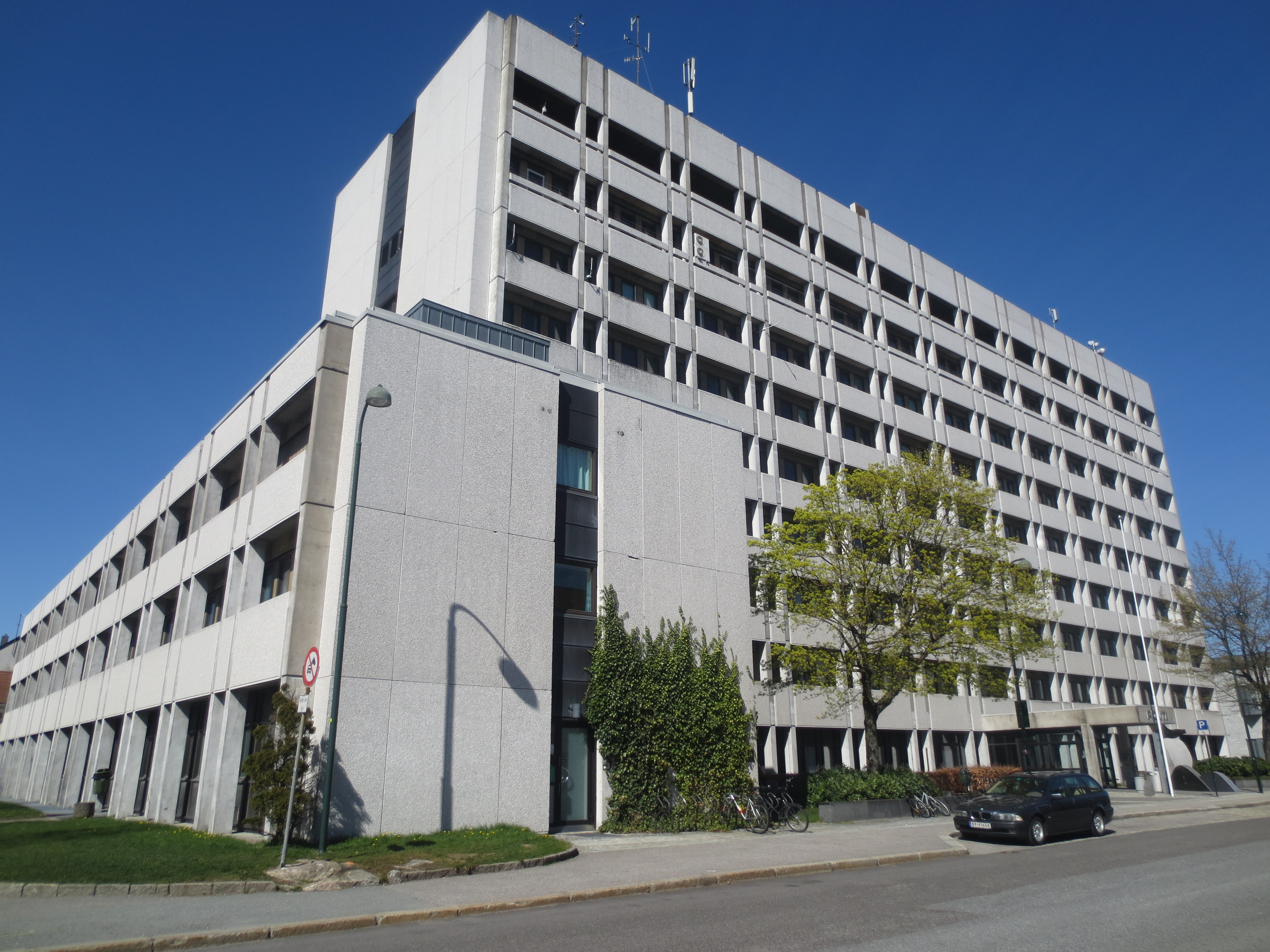
Agder Police District headquarter in Kristiansand

In crime performed by people under 18, there were most reported 16-year-old boys in 2013. Although adding the numbers of boys and girls together, the largest number of crime for the age was 14. It is simultaneously more that reports a mixed sex image where girls show an equal activity as boys. Some Instead there are also girls who are leading the way. Several executives tells increased used of bullying, intimidation and violence among girls. It looks including out that girls make greater use of social media such behavior. Some also report increased cannabis use among girls. The figures from the police show that nearly one in three young people who commit crimes have minority backgrounds. Of the 163 youths who embarked offense first half is 47 immigrants or Norwegian-born to immigrant parents. This represents 29% of the total number. The decline in the number of young offenders apply primarily the oldest group from 15 to 17 years. Kristiansand has several 14-year-olds than 17-year-olds who commit offenses. Girls make up more current through increased use of threats and violence.

Contact from Voiebyen, Vågsbygd, Grim, Søm and Lund expressed concern about boys who challenge them with their behavior by breaking rules, commit vandalism, threaten classmates and try out various drugs. One of the schools have also been several incidents of violence against teachers and classmates. It is composed issues related to several of these students and they have various reasons major challenges in adapting to school requirements and expectations. Several executives from schools stated that they experience an increase in the number of pupils, both boys and girls, who are struggling mentally. They mention students with depression, social anxiety, eating disorder, self-mutilation and sleep problems. This worries them and they fear that some of these students, as a result of their poor mental health, are more vulnerable to make choices that can lead them into the environment with drugs and crime. To meet these challenges and provide these young people needed and customized follow-up, it is crucial to have a holistic focus and a good interdepartmental and interdisciplinary collaboration.

== Health ==
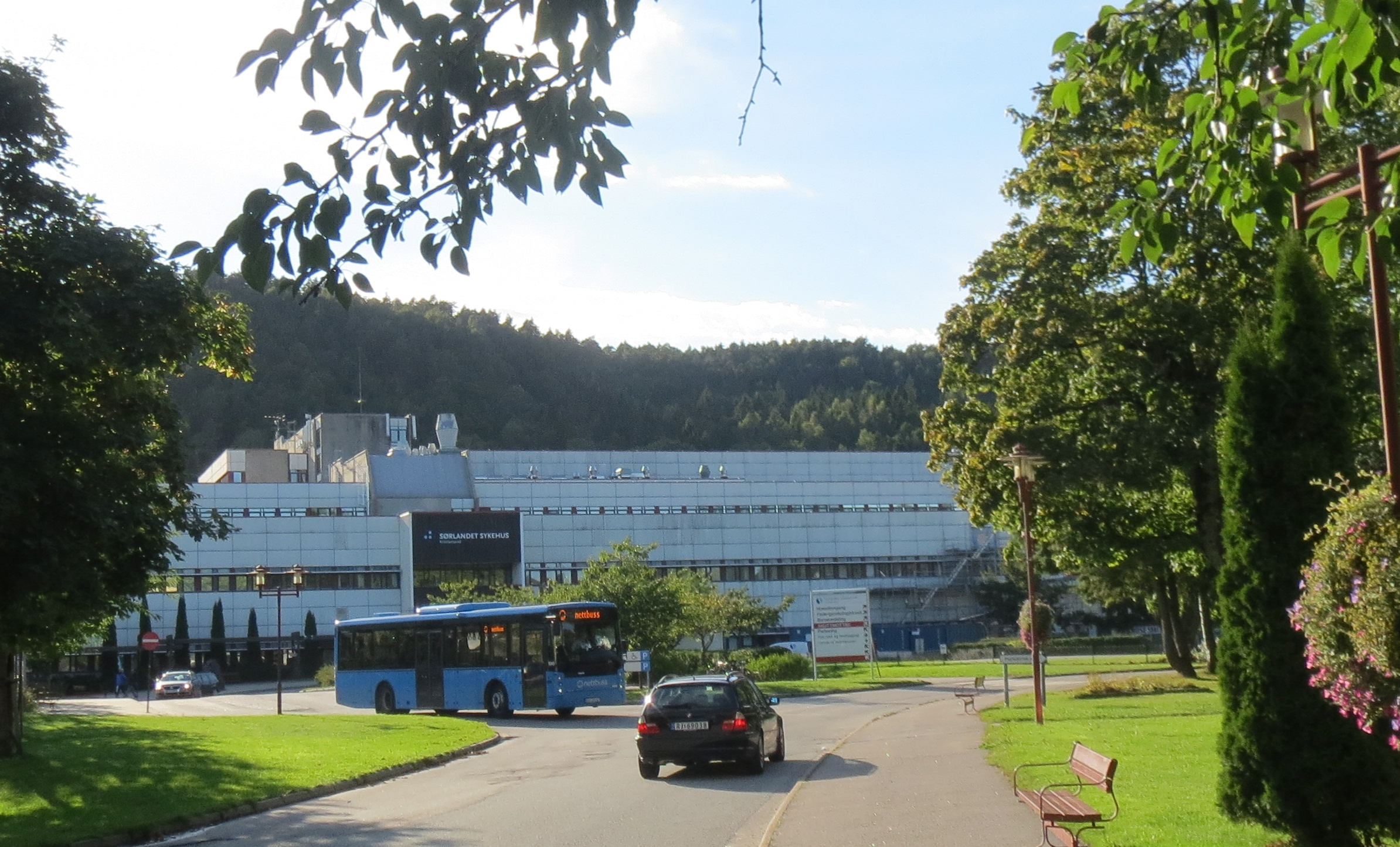
Sørlandet Hospital Kristiansand

Sørlandet Sykehus HF is a hospital group in Southern Norway, they have three hospitals in Flekkefjord, Arendal and the main one on Eg in Kristiansand. Sørlandet Hospital Kristiansand is only a 6-minute drive from the city centrum Kvadraturen. The headquarter of Sørlandet Sykehus HF is also located in Kristiansand. The hospital has departments in Vågsbygd and Oddernes.

Eg hospital is an asylum/psychiatric hospital next to Sørlandet hospital. It was opened in 1881 by dr. Axel H. Lindboe, this became Norway's third insane asylum.

St. Josef hospital was a catholic hospital located at Kvadraturen, it was opened in 1885 and driven by his sisters. The hospital closed down in 1967.

There are 11 retirement homes in Kristiansand and most of them are located on Kvadraturen. One rehabilitation center, ca 15 fitness centers, 20 dentist offices, 10 medical centers and around 25 pharmacies.

== Transportation ==
Kristiansand is an important transport and communications node, connected to continental Europe by air and sea.

=== Sea ===
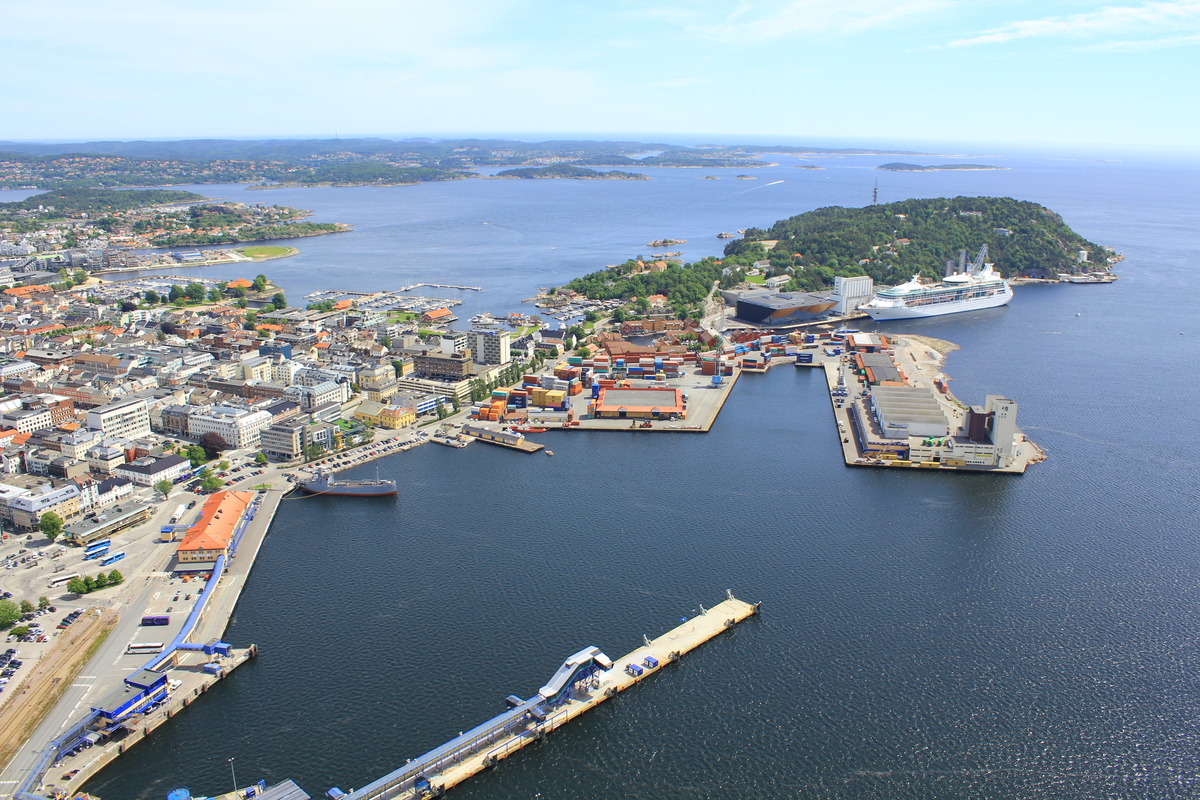
Kristiansand harbour in 2013

From the city centre, the ferry harbour has routes to Hirtshals (Denmark) operated by both Color Line and Fjord Line. Color Line operates the SuperSpeed 1, which entered into service in 2008 and spends approximately 3 hours and 15 minutes on the crossing. The route operates year-round with two crossings each way in one day. Fjord Line operates HSC Fjord Cat, which is a high-speed catamaran covering the route in around 2 hours and 15 minutes. The ship was built between 1997 and 1998, and has sailed under several different operators on many different routes. It only operates during the high season in the summer.

A new catamaran built by Australian shipbuilding company Austal will enter service at the start of summer 2020 and replace Fjord Cat. The new ship should double the capacity, while retaining the same travel duration of 2 hours and 15 minutes. Fjord Line also aims for the new ship to address complaints with seaworthiness and stability from its predecessor.

On 7 April 2022, a direct cruise-ferry service began with Eemshaven, Netherlands, operated by startup company Holland Norway Lines.

==== Cruise terminal ====
In 2017 a Cruise terminal was added and with a power connection large enough to allow suitably equipped ships to connect and turn off all their engines the terminal is .5 kilometers from the city centre and optionally has a land-train

=== Road ===
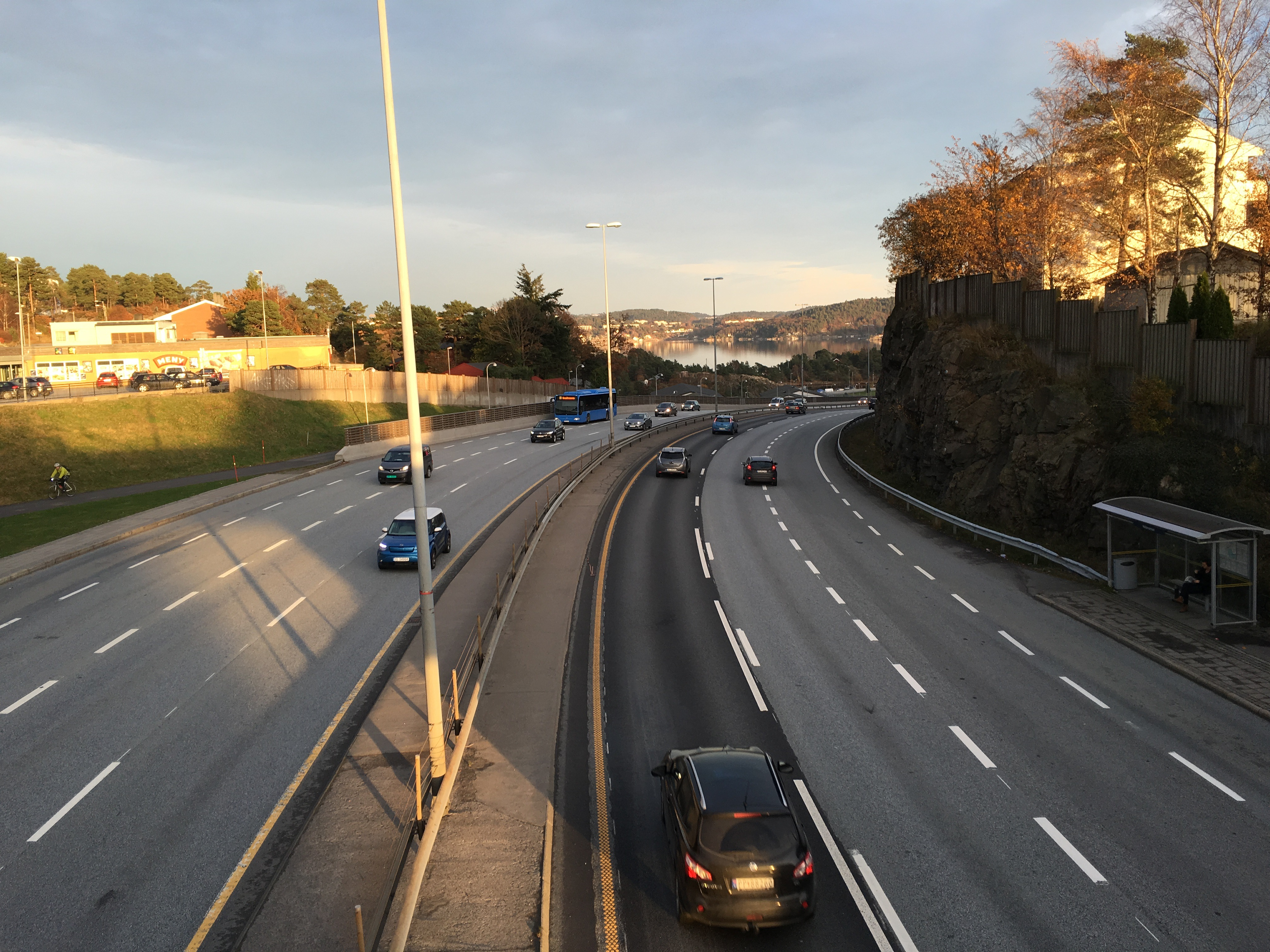
E18 in Kristiansand by Vollevannet

==== European routes ====
European Road 18 is the largest highway in Kristiansand. Varodd Bridge is a large bridge and a part of E18, which stretches over the Topdalsfjorden in Kristiansand. The highway starts after E39 goes to Denmark before the city bridge on Kvadraturen. E18 continues out of Kristiansand Municipality and through Arendal, Oslo, and ends in Stockholm. European Road 39 starts in Trondheim and has its course through Western Norway before following the coastal municipalities in Agder county. When E39 comes to Kristiansand, it goes to the harbor and continues to Denmark via a ferry.

==== Norwegian national roads ====
Norwegian National Road 9 is a road starting in Kristiansand and going north through Grim and then through Vennesla Municipality and on to Telemark where it ends at Haukeli, and is the most important road connection for Setesdalen and the surrounding regions. Norwegian National Road 41 starts in Hånes. It is the road out to Kristiansand Airport, Kjevik, it continues to Birkenes Municipality and ends in Kviteseid Municipality in Telemark.

==== Norwegian county roads ====
County road 401 is the old E18 (before it was rerouted and upgraded). It starts on Søm and ends in Lillesand, it goes via Høvåg. County road 452 is the old road to Vennesla. It starts on Lund, then goes through Justvik and Ålefjær before entering Vennesla Municipality. County road 456 is the main road in Vågsbygd and afterwards ending in Søgne. County road 457 takes up from 456 in Voiebyen and ends at Flekkerøy. County road 471 is the largest road in downtown Kristiansand. It ends at Lund and goes besides the university.

=== Bus ===
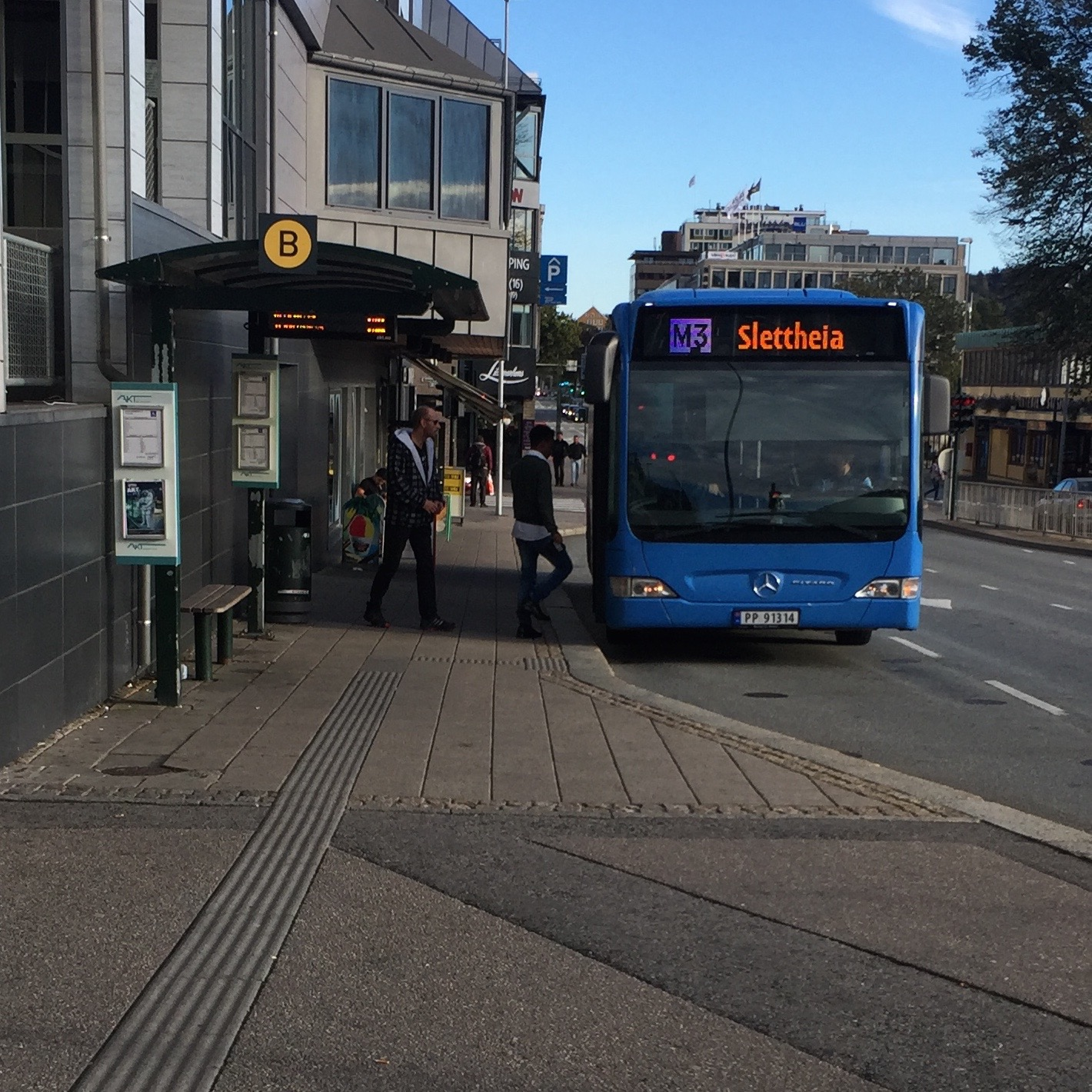
A city bus in Vestre Strandgate

Buses in the city and surrounding region are operated by Boreal Buss AS, who won the tender from Agder Kollektivtrafikk in 2018 to operate routes for seven years, with an option to extend the period by three years. Previously, Nettbuss Sør (South) operated buses in the region for eight years from 2010 to 2018. All regional bus lines goes through three stops in Kvadraturen. Some bus lines goes vice versa from the west coast to the east coast of the city.

Kristiansand Bus Terminal or Kristiansand Rutebilstasjon is the main bus terminal for the city, and also acts as a hub for express-buses connecting to Oslo, Stavanger and Haukeli. It is located by the train station Kristiansand S. The bus terminal has local, regional and long-distance bus routes. A new bus terminal was constructed in 2019, replacing the old and outdated building from 1960. The old terminal will be demolished and replaced by a small park and green-space.

The local city buses in Kristiansand has their main stop in Kvadraturen with city terminals in the streets Henrik Wergelands gate (eastbond or end for westbound) and Tollbodgata (westbound or end for eastbound), both streets crosses Markens gate. City bus lines 01, A1 starts in Kvadraturen and goes by UiA and Rona. M1, M2, M3, 12, goes by Vågsbygd centrum. 17, 18 joins M1, M2, M3 and 12 for Hannevika. 40, 42, 50 and 45, 46 goes only Hannevika. Line 40, 42, 45, 46 and 50 stops in Kristiansand Bus Terminal expect in the rush hours, while M1, M2, M3, 12, 17 and 18 continues to Henrik Wergelands gate, UiA, Rona, then their destinations. Line 13, 15, 19, 32 and 30 comes north for Kvadraturen and goes by Grim torv. Line 22, 23 only goes by UiA. Line 31 goes Line 35, 36 and 37 goes by Ve, Rona, UiA, Tollbodgata and ends in Kristiansand Bus Terminal. There are also local buses in some of the boroughs like Vågsbygd: Line 51, 52 and 55 goes from neighbourhoods in the borough to Vågsbygd centrum collaborating with M1 or M2 at selective times. Line 57 goes from east to west on the main road in Flekkerøy. Line 58 goes locally in Randesund to Rona.

=== Railway ===
Kristiansand Station opened in 1895 and is located in the city centre, close to the ferry terminal. It is owned by Norwegian National Rail Administration. The Sørlandet Line goes through small towns in Agder county. Express trains go east to Oslo S. Regional lines goes to Stavanger.

=== Aviation ===
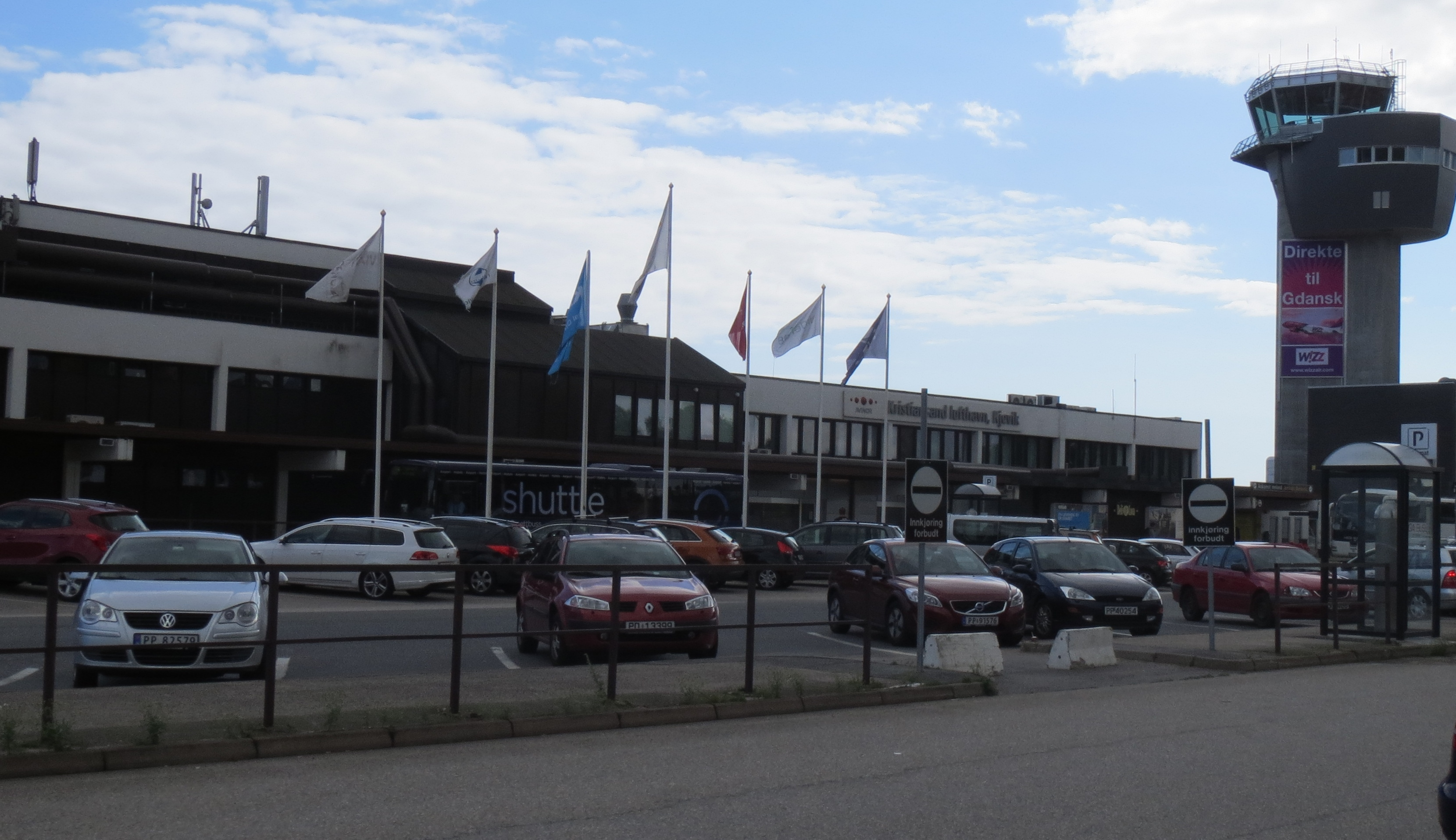
Kristiansand Airport, Kjevik

The local airport, Kjevik, is located 12 km (7.5 mi) east of the city centre and has routes to European and Norwegian cities. A new one-storey parking garage was constructed in 2019.

=== Travel distances ===
Distance from Kristiansand to other cities:

- Mandal, 36 kilometres or 22 miles
- Evje, 49 kilometres or 30 miles
- Arendal, 55 kilometres or 34 miles
- Flekkefjord, 81 kilometres or 50 miles
- Stavanger, 160 kilometres or 99 miles
- Oslo, 250 kilometres or 160 miles
- Bergen, 292 kilometres or 181 miles
- Trondheim, 601 kilometres or 373 miles
- Tromsø, 1,382 kilometres or 859 miles
- Copenhagen, 391 kilometres or 243 miles
- Stockholm, 768 kilometres or 477 miles

== Education ==
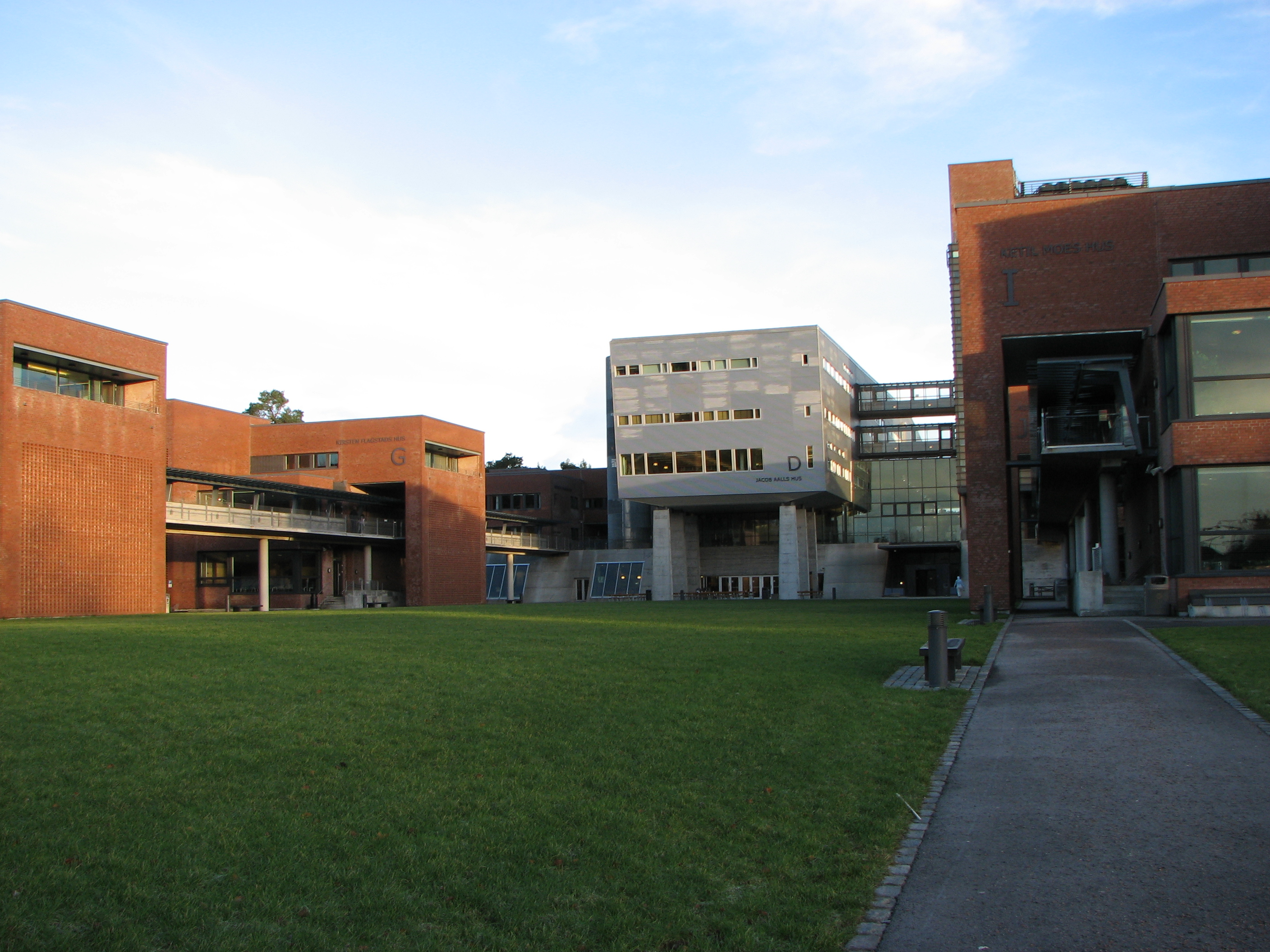
University of Agder

The University of Agder was established in 2007, based on Agder College, which had been founded in 1994 by the amalgamation of six previous institutions: Kristiansand Teacher Training College, Agder District College, Kristiansand College of Nursing, Arendal College of Nursing, Agder Engineering and District College (Grimstad) and Agder Conservatory of Music. The university has about 10,000 students, of whom 7,500 are in Kristiansand and the remaining 2,500 in Grimstad. In Kristiansand it is housed on a campus on the former parade ground of Gimlemoen in the Lund section. The university offers a wide range of studies at all levels, organised into five faculties: Humanities and Education, Engineering and Science, Health and Sport, Economics and Social Sciences, and Fine Arts. Gimlemoen is also the site of Sørlandet kunnskapspark, a research park built with funds from sources including the Cultiva foundation that houses a number of companies with a degree of professional affiliation with the university, such as Agderforskning, a social science research institute that is part of the publishing company Cappelen Damm.

Noroff University College was established in 2012 and is a private university offering specialised degrees two in Interactive media (Games or Animation) and Applied Data Science and in Digital Forensics. The University College builds on Noroff's existing vocational school which originally opened in 1987. In addition to the Kristiansand Campus Noroff has facilities in Oslo, Bergen and Stavanger. Noroff has considerable experience in offering online courses and all of the degree courses offered at the University College are available online.

Kristiansand was a garrison and cathedral town from 1664; Kristiansand Cathedral School was founded in 1684 and a Latin school in 1734. There are currently four public senior secondary schools: Kristiansand Cathedral School Gimle, Vågsbygd High School, Kvadraturen skolesenter and Tangen High School

Private senior secondary schools include Sonans utdanning (education). The private school Sørlandets Maritime Senior Secondary School is also based in Kristiansand. This school offers two courses of study, Technology and Industrial Production and maritime subjects. It is a boarding school; students live and undergo training aboard the training ship MS Sjøkurs, a steamer that previously operated on the Hurtigruten.

Kristiansand is also host to an International School on Kongsgård Alle in Lund. The School opened in January 2008 to provide an international education through English to students from grade 1 to grade 10. This IB authorised school moved into a brand new purpose-built building in Summer 2014, to house the expanding school which now has over 100 students.

=== List of schools in Kristiansand ===
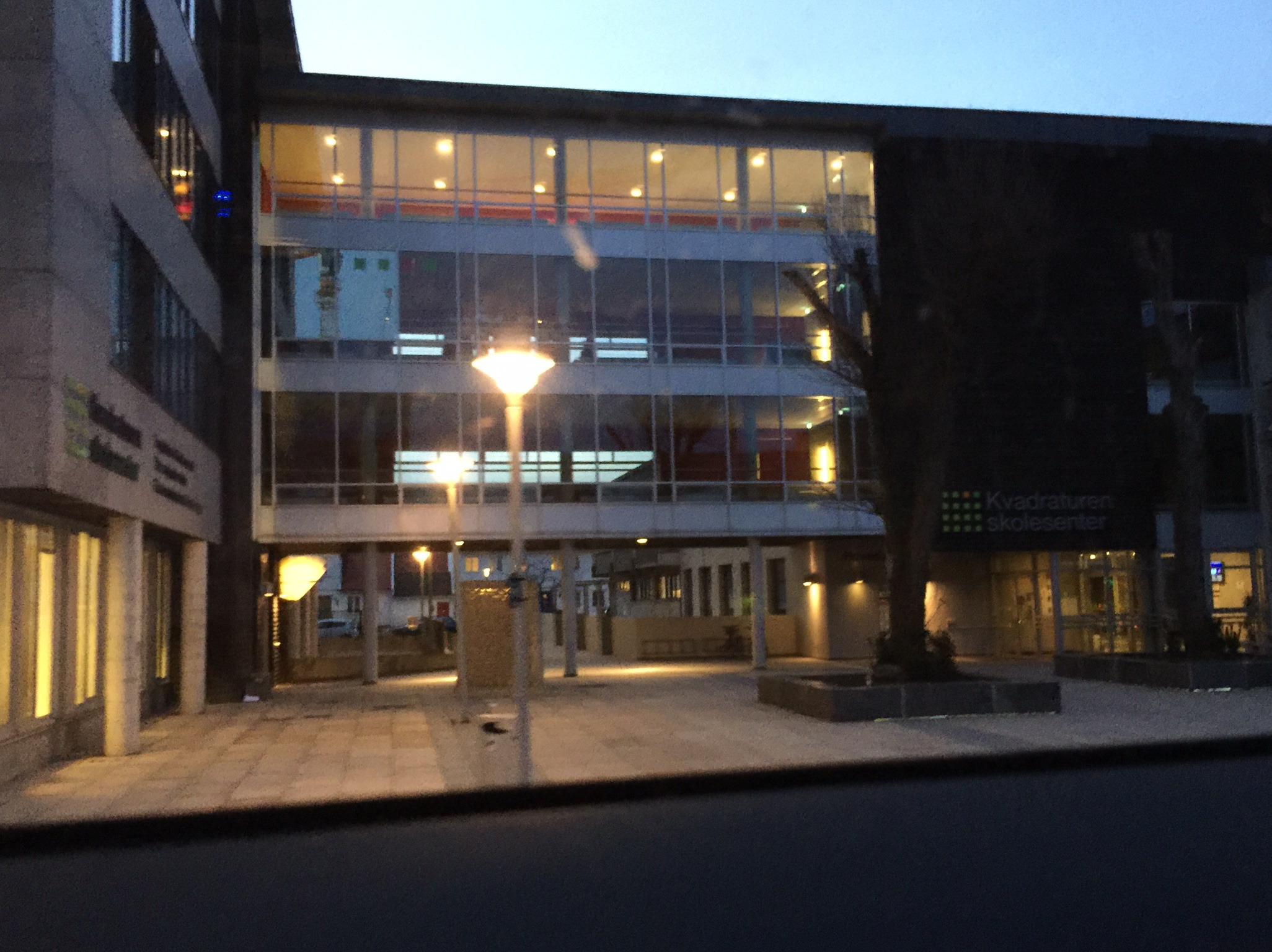
Kvadraturen skolesenter is the largest High School in Southern Norway

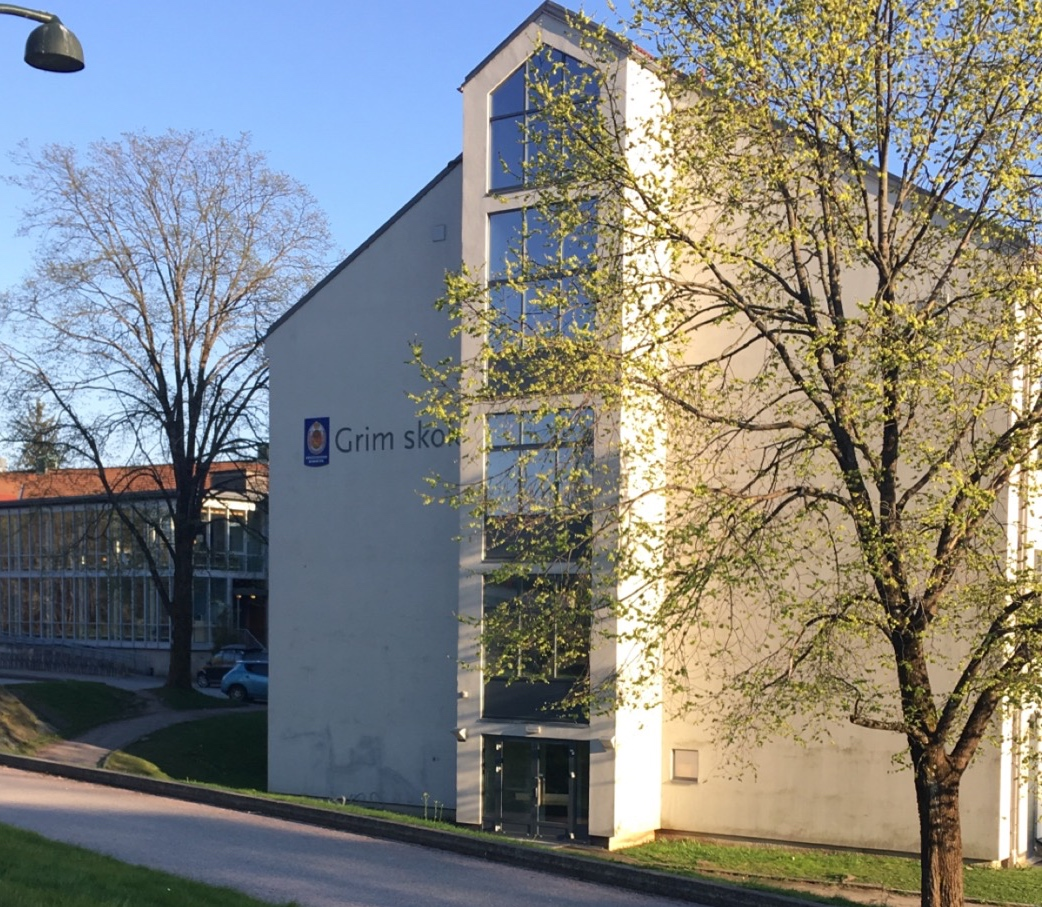
Grim Junior High is the largest junior high

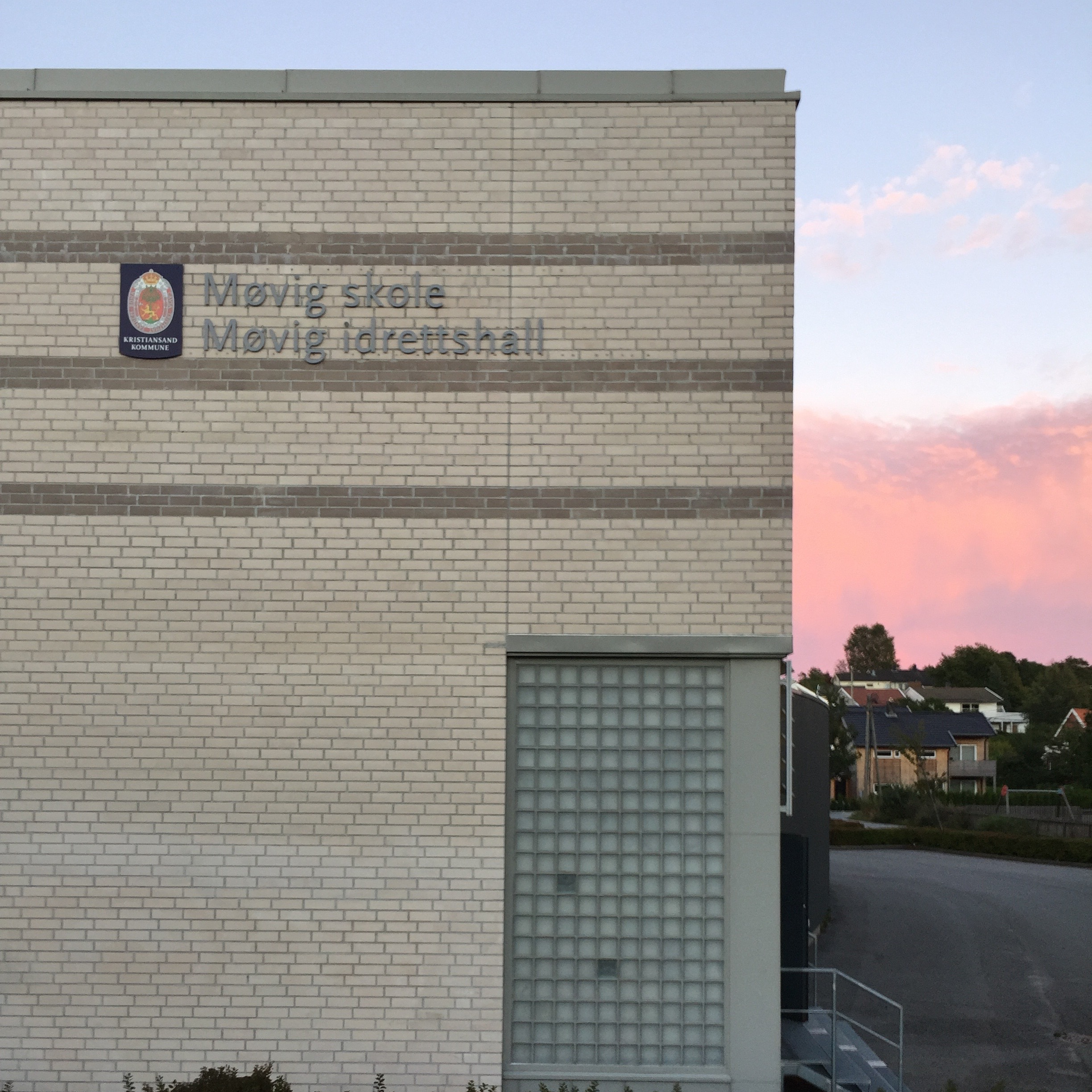
Møvik Junior High and Møvik sports hall

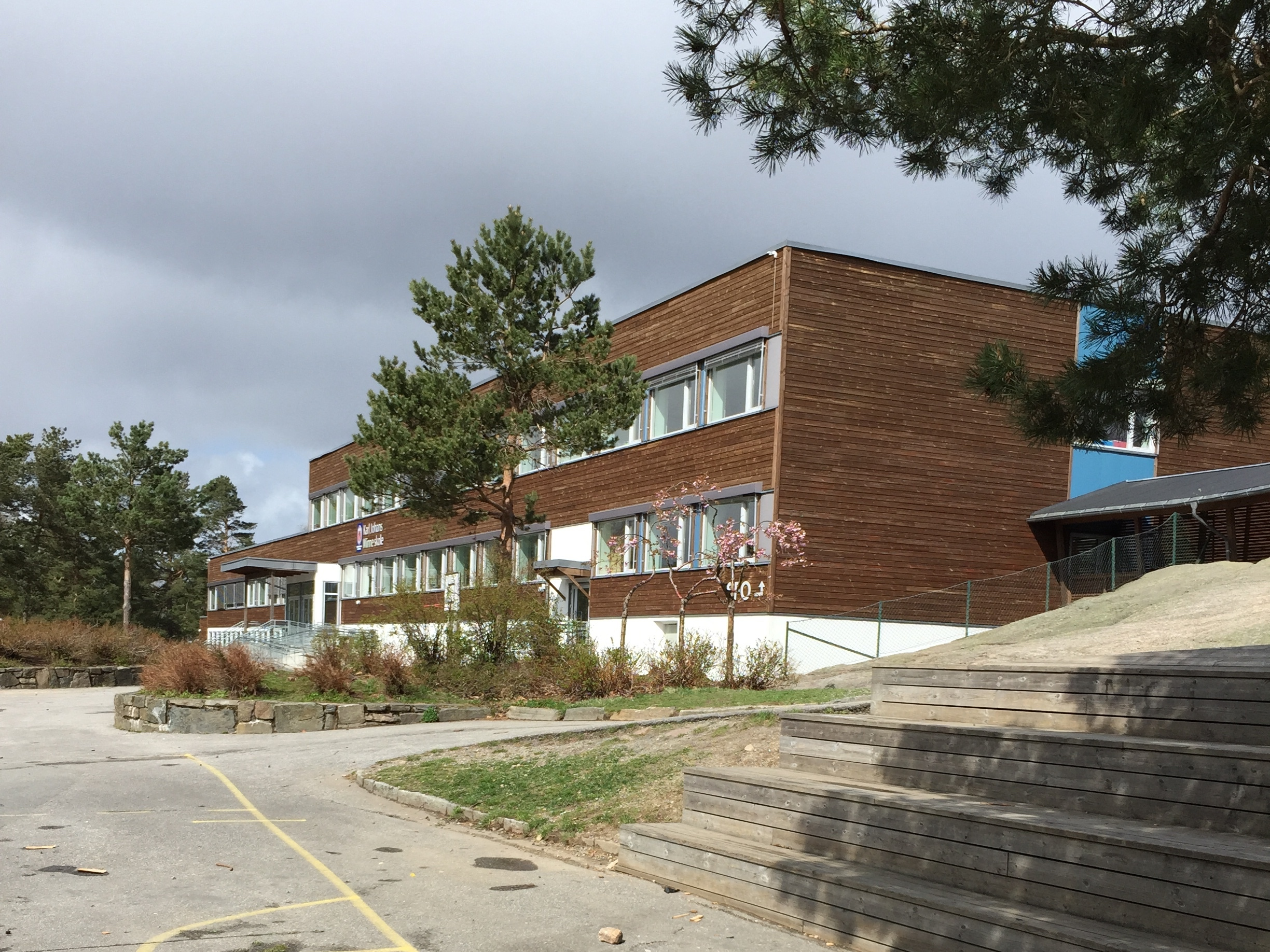
Karl Johan Memorial School, an elementary school at Tinnheia

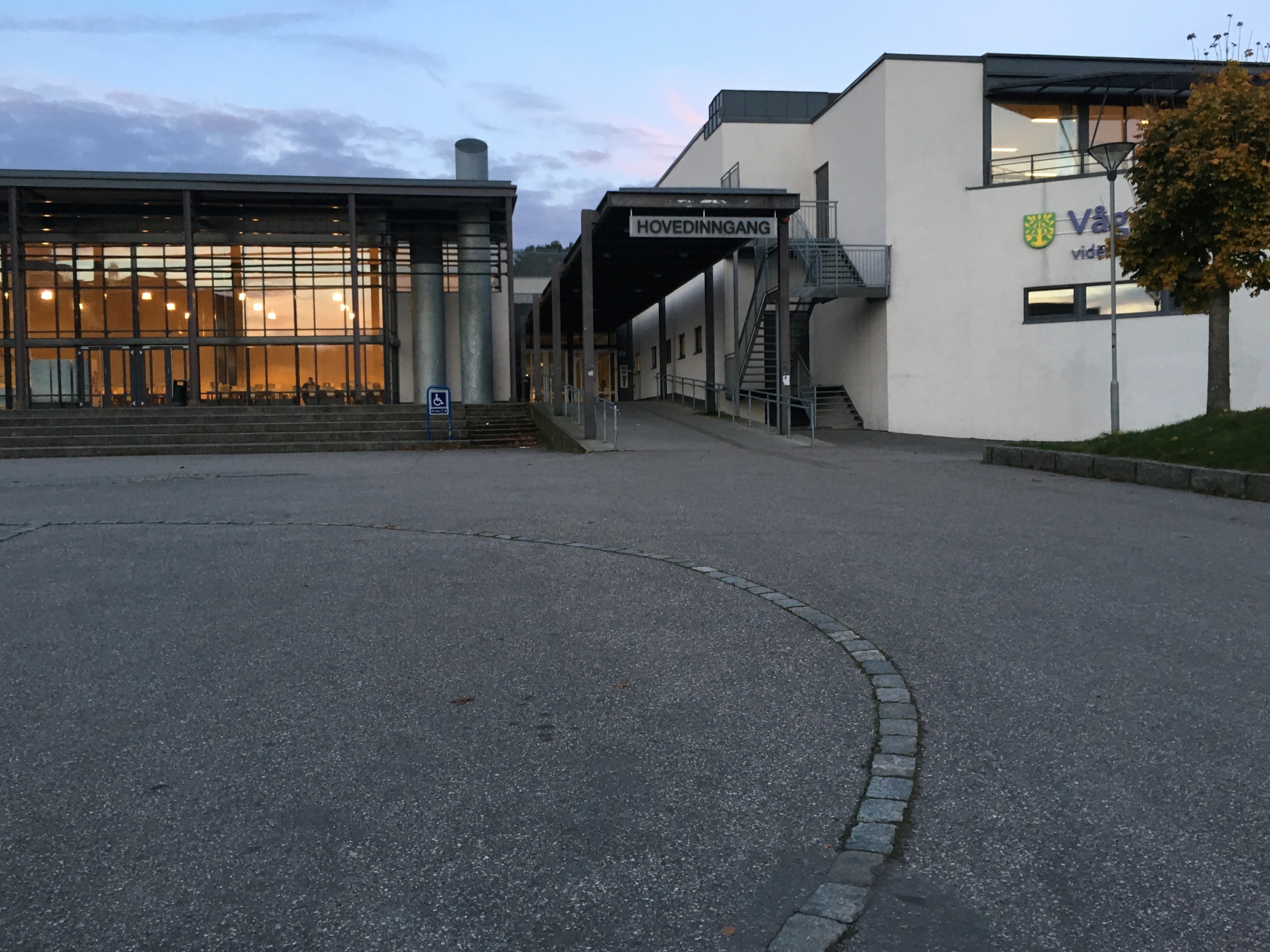
Vågsbygd High School

Name	Type	District	Students	Status
Dvergsnes skole	Elementary	Oddernes	360	Public
Fagerholt skole	Elementary	Lund	N/A	Public
Fiskå skole	Junior High	Vågsbygd	300	Public
Flekkerøy skole	Elementary	Vågsbygd	N/A	Public
Grim skole	Junior High	Grim	500	Public
Haumyrheia skole	Junior High	Oddernes	300	Public
Havlimyra skole	Junior High	Lund	N/A	Public
Hellemyr skole	Elementary	Grim	N/A	Public
Holte skole	Junior High	Oddernes	250	Public
Hånes skole	Elementary	Oddernes	N/A	Public
Justvik skole	Elementary	Lund	N/A	Public
Karl Johan minneskole (memorial)	Elementary	Grim	250	Public
Karuss skole	Elementary and Junior High	Vågsbygd	N/A	Public
Kongsgård skolesenter	Elementary	Lund	900	Private
Kringsjå skole	Elementary	Randesund	N/A	Public
Krossen skole	Elementary	Grim	N/A	Public
Kristiansand Cathedral School	High School	Lund	1,360	Public
Kristiansand International School	Elementary and Junior High	Lund	N/A	Private
Kvadraturen skolesenter	High School	Kvadraturen	1,500	Public
Lindebøskauen skole	Junior High	Vågsbygd	N/A	Public
Lovisenlund skole	Elementary	Lund	N/A	Public
Mosby skole	Elementary	Mosby	N/A	Public
Møvig skole	Junior High	Vågsbygd	400	Public
NLA Mediehøgskolen Gimlekollen	College	Lund	130	Private
Oddemarka skole	Junior High	Lund	N/A	Public
Prestheia skole	Elementary	Lund	N/A	Public
Sjøstrand skole	Elementary	Vågsbygd	N/A	Public
Slettheia skole	Elementary	Vågsbygd	N/A	Public
Solholmen skole	Elementary	Grim	200	Public
Steinerskolen	Elementarty and Junior High	Lund	N/A	Private
Strømme skole	Elementary	Oddernes	370	Public
Sørlandets maritime videregående skole	High School	MS "Sjøkurs"	60	Private
Tangen vidergående	High School	Kvadraturen	1,000	Public
Tordenskjoldsgate skole	Elementary	Kvadraturen	150	Public
Torkelsmyra skole	Elementary	Vågsbygd	N/A	Public
Torridal skole	Elementary and Junior High	Grim	N/A	Public
Universitetet i Agder	University	Lund	11,500	Public
Vardåsen skole	Elementary	Oddernes	350	Public
Ve skole	Elementary and Junior High	Oddernes	N/A	Public
Vigvoll skole	Junior High	Oddernes	200	Public
Voiebyen skole	Elementary	Vågsbygd	N/A	Public
Vågsbygd skole	Elementary	Vågsbygd	270	Public
Vågsbygd vidergående	High School	Vågsbygd	800	Public
Frank Wild Minneskole (memorial)	Elementary	Lund	N/A	Public
Øvre Slettheia skole	Elementary	Vågsbygd	N/A	Public
Åsane skole	Elementary	Vågsbygd	N/A	Public

== Media ==
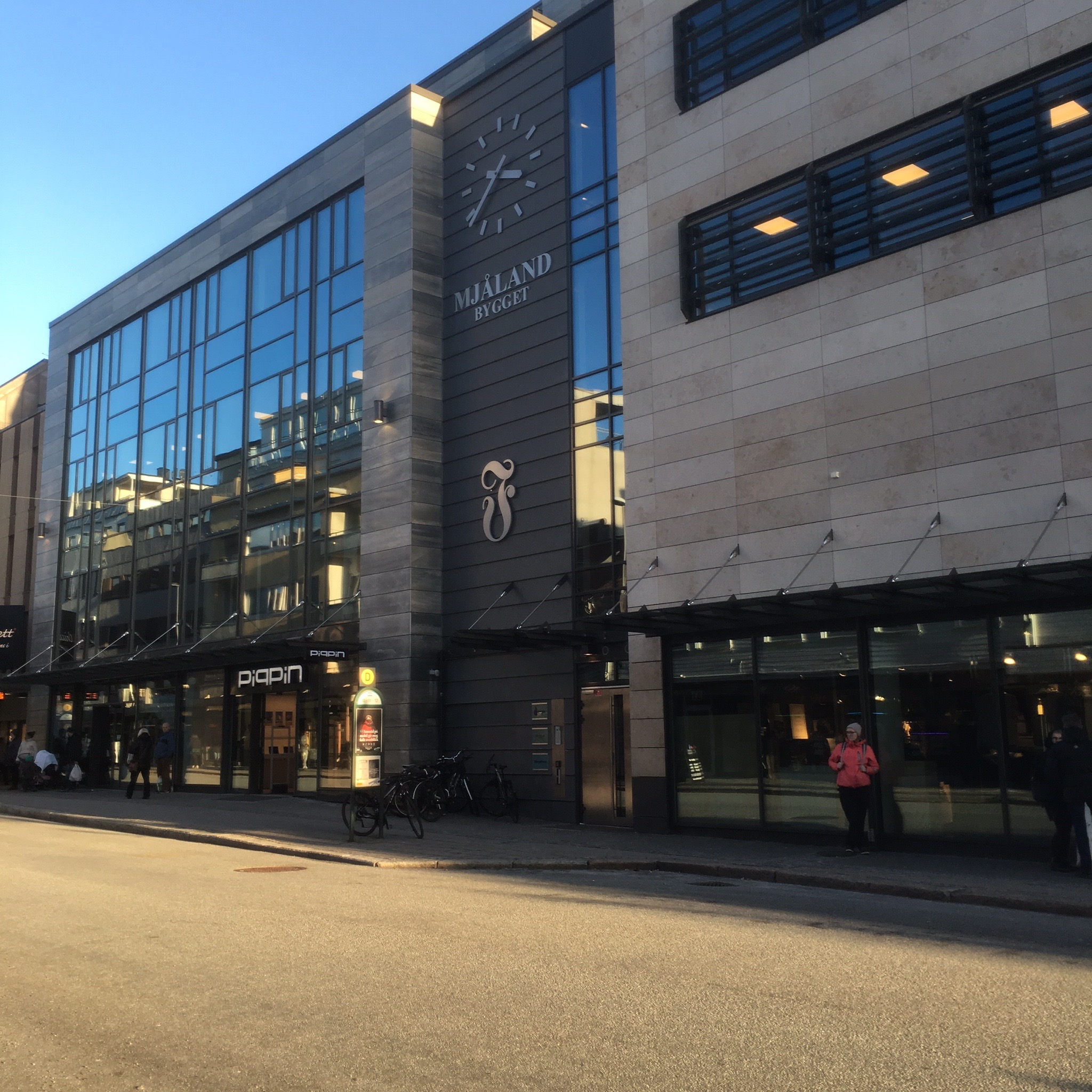
Fædrelandsvennen office building in Henrik Wergelands gate

Fædrelandsvennen is the main news paper in Kristiansand and the Kristiansand Region. The paper has around 116 000 readers every day and was founded in 1875. From 2006, the newspaper went from broadsheet to tabloid. Fædrelandsvennen was located at Rådhusgata with Wergelandsparken (A park named after Henrik Wergeland) until 02.27.192 when someone blew up the building and it burned down to the ground. Nobody lost their lives in the incident. The newspaper relocated to Fiskåtangen in Vågsbygd where it located until 2015 when it moved back downtown to Henrik Wergelands gate. Fædrelandsvennen have ownership in many Southern Norway based newspapers, TV-Channels radio stations and other companies.

Kristiansand Avis (Kristiansand Newspaper) is a free newspaper paid by ads, and is delivered to all households in the region except Lillesand, Birkenes and Iveland. The newspaper is focused on staying closed to the local people. It comes out each Thursday and had 45 000 readers in 2014.

NRK Sørlandet has their main office in Kristiansand. It is the district office for the national broadcasting channel NRK. NRK Sørlandet covers Aust-Agder and Vest-Agder County. They produce 6 hours of radio and one and a half hour of television, in addition to their own website for news for Southern Norway.

== Notable people ==
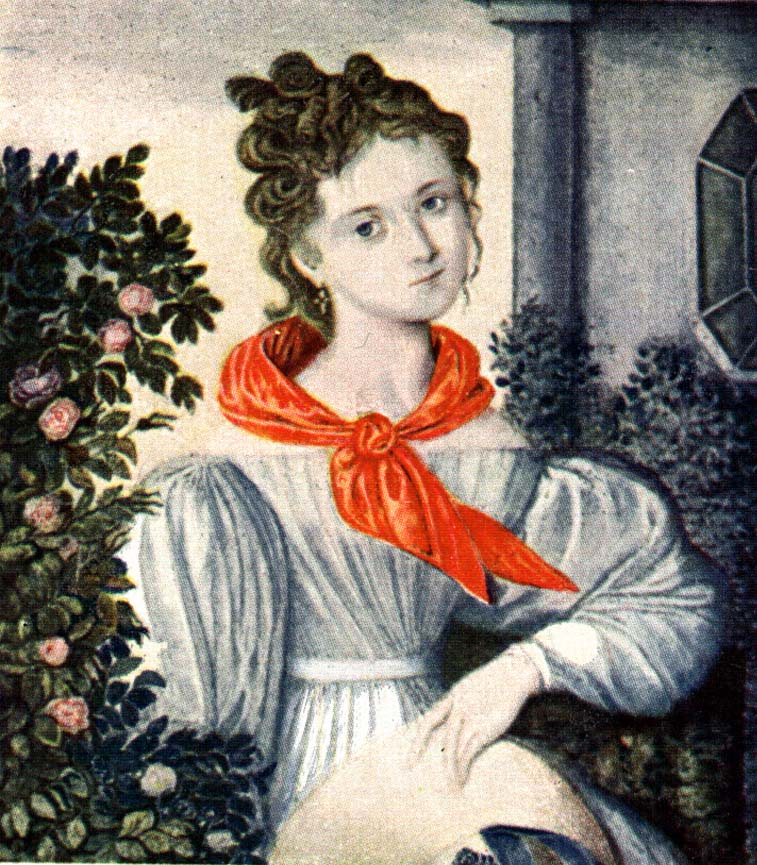
Camilla Collett

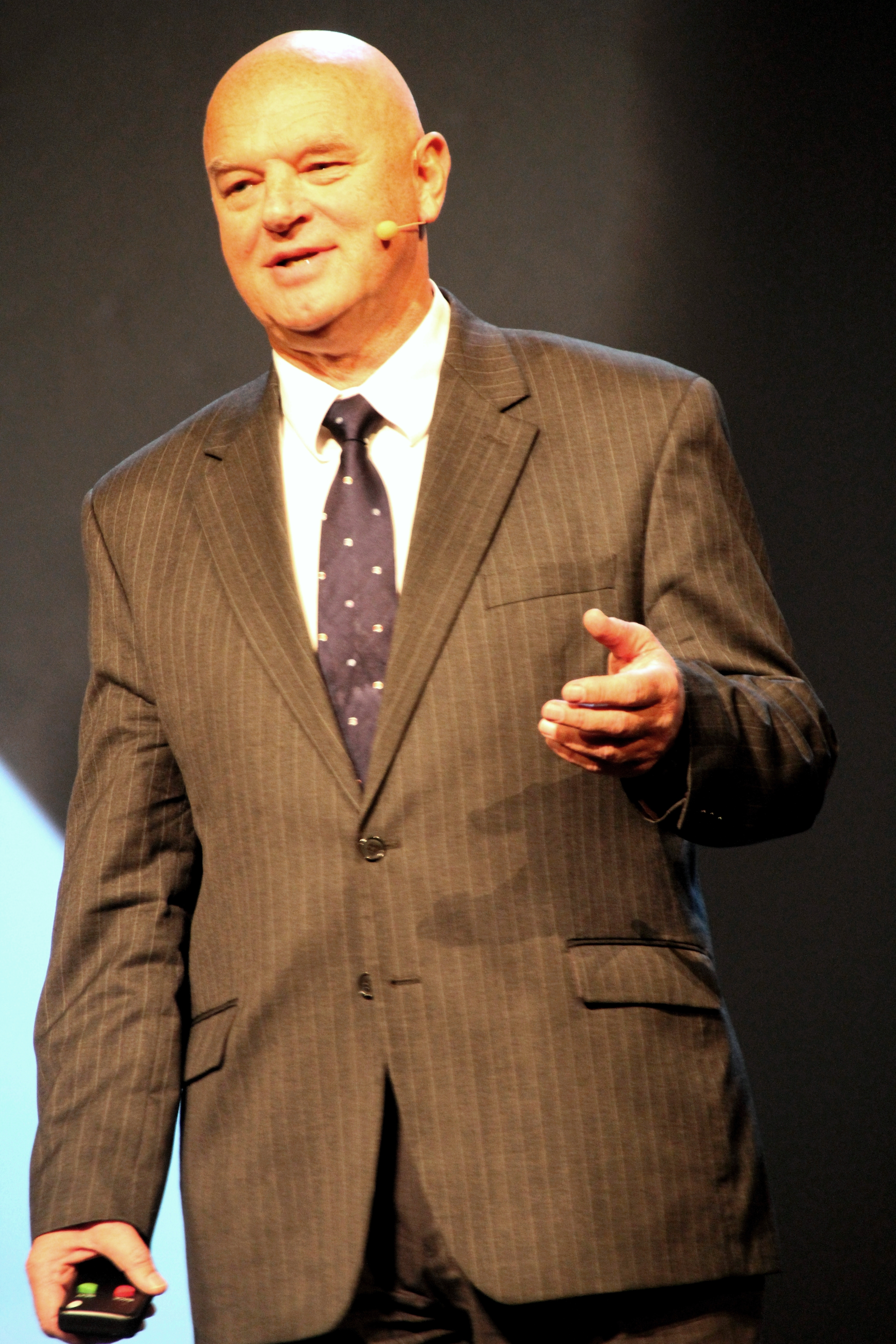
Jan Vincents Johannessen, 2012

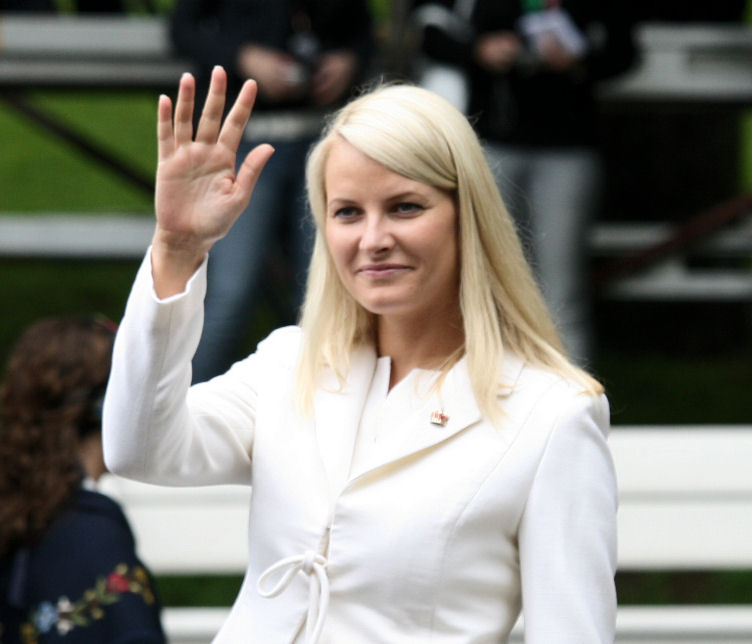
Mette-Marit, Queen Consort of Norway

=== Education ===
- Haldur Grüner (1818–1858), business school founder

=== Public Service and public thinking ===
- Syvert Omundsen Eeg (1757–1838), a farmer and representative at the Norwegian Constitutional Assembly
- Marcus Gjøe Rosenkrantz (1762–1838), a Government Minister and Member of Parliament
- Nicolai Wergeland (1780–1848), a priest, writer, and Norwegian politician
- Jens Lauritz Arup (1793–1874), a bishop and Norwegian politician
- Hans Christian Petersen (1793–1862), the de facto Prime Minister of Norway from 1858 to 1861
- Jacob von der Lippe (1797–1878), a Norwegian politician and priest
- Camilla Collett (1813–1895), said to be Norway's first feminist and writer
- Herman Wedel Major (1814–1854), a psychiatrist who founded the Gaustad Hospital
- Joseph Frantz Oscar Wergeland (1815–1895), a military officer, cartographer, and skiing pioneer
- Einar Rosenqvist (1817–1885), a Norwegian naval officer and politician
- Valdemar Knudsen (1819–1898), a sugarcane plantation pioneer on West Kauai, Hawaii
- Jens Peter Broch (1819–1886), an orientalist and linguist in Semitic languages
- Sofus Arctander (1845–1924), a politician who was acting Prime Minister of Norway in 1905
- William Brede Kristensen (1867–1953), a Dutch theologian, professor, and church historian
- Theo Sørensen (1873–1959), a missionary who worked in Tibet
- Finn Støren (1893–1962), a businessperson and civil servant for Nasjonal Samling
- Arvid G. Hansen (1894–1966), a politician who was associated first with the Labour Party, then the Communist Party
- Gabriel Langfeldt (1895–1983), a psychiatrist and academic
- Bernt Balchen (1899–1973), a pioneer polar aviator, navigator & aircraft mechanical engineer
- Ole Wehus (1909–1947), a Nasjonal Samling police official
- Leo Tallaksen (1908–1983), a politician who was twice elected mayor of Kristiansand Municipality
- Bjørn Egge CBE (1918–2007), a major general of the Norwegian Army
- Jan Vincents Johannessen (born 1941), a physician, cancer researcher, painter, and composer
- Tor Fuglevik (born 1950), a radio and TV executive
- Anne Berit Andersen (born 1951), a Norwegian politician who was Mayor of Søgne Municipality from 1991 to 2001
- Terje G. Simonsen (born 1963), a historian and nonfiction author
- Harald Furre (born 1964), an economist and Mayor of Kristiansand Municipality from 2015–2019
- Marie Benedicte Bjørnland (born 1965), the head of the Norwegian Police Security Service from 2012–2019
- Nicolai Tangen (born 1966), a hedge fund manager and philanthropist
- Queen Mette-Marit of Norway (born 1972), married the future Haakon VIII in 2001

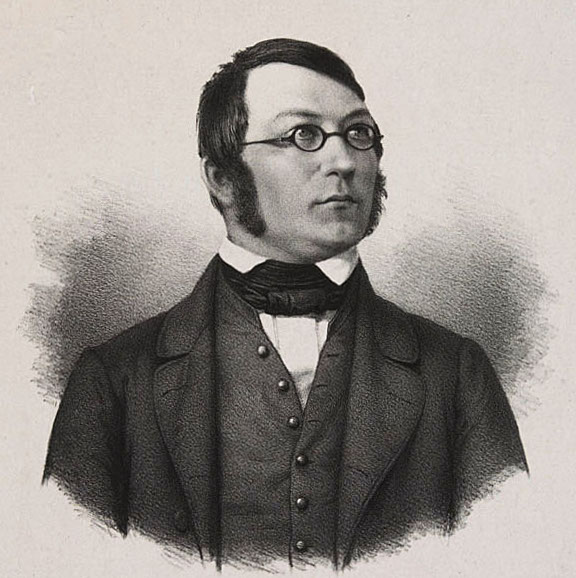
Henrik Wergeland

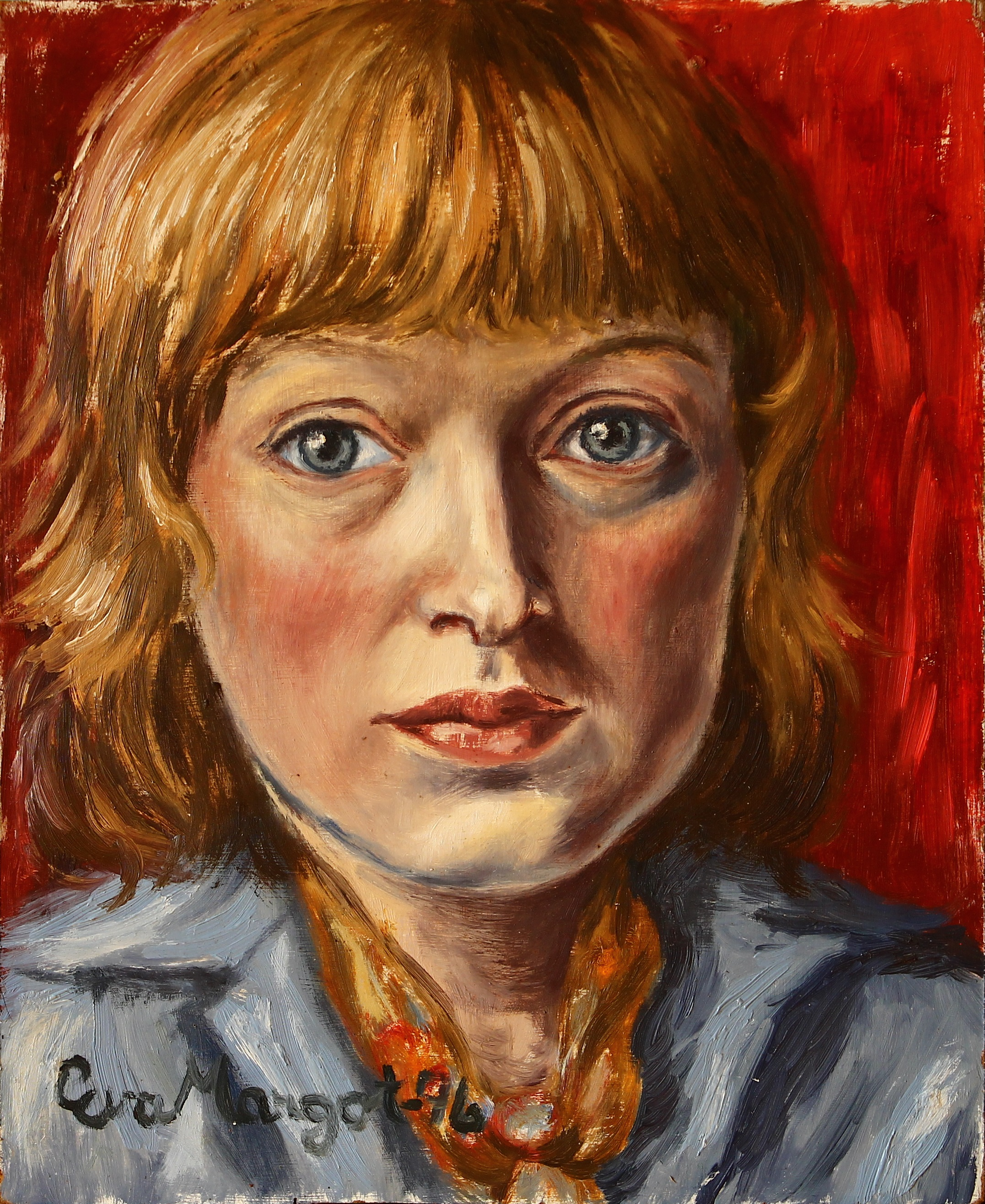
Eva Margot, self-portrait, 1976

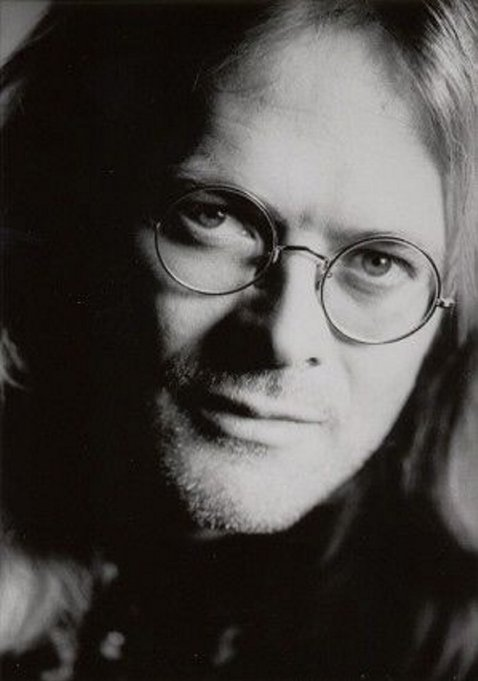
Bjørn Ole Rasch, 2013

=== The Arts ===
- Henrik Wergeland (1808–1845), a writer, poet, playwright, polemicist, historian and linguist
- Dan Weggeland (1827–1918), an artist and teacher, the "Father of Utah Art"
- Anton Jörgen Andersen (1845–1926), a composer and cellist
- Octavia Sperati (1847–1918), an actress
- Gerhard Schjelderup (1859–1933), a composer of operas
- Oskar Textorius (1864–1938), a Swedish actor, singer, and theater director
- Nils Hald (1897–1963), an actor
- Ellen Isefiær (1899–1985), an actress and stage director
- Jens Bjørneboe (1920–1976), a novelist, writer, and painter
- Else Marie Jakobsen (1927–2012), a textile artist and designer
- Finn Benestad (1929–2012), a musicologist, music critic, and academic
- Eva Margot (1944–2019), a painter who used realism, symbolism, and abstract styles
- Terje Formoe, (born 1949) a singer, songwriter, and actor
- Rolf Løvland (born 1955), a composer, lyricist, arranger, and pianist
- Terje Dragseth (born 1955), a poet, author, and film director
- Kjell Nupen (1955–2014), a contemporary artist who was a painter, sculptor, and graphic artist
- Hilde Hefte (born 1956), a jazz singer
- Bjørn Ole Rasch (born 1959), a keyboard performer, composer, arranger, and academic
- Sigurd Køhn (1959–2004), a jazz saxophonist and composer
- Arne Hjeltnes (born 1963), a writer and TV personality
- Per Fronth (born 1963), a visual artist, photographer, and painter
- Bjarte Tjøstheim (born 1967), a comedian, radio host and actor
- Lene Elise Bergum (born 1971), an actress
- Bjarte Breiteig (born 1974), a short story writer
- Anne Lilia Berge Strand (born 1977), known as "Annie", a singer-songwriter
- Tom Hugo (born 1979), a singer-songwriter
- Agnes Kittelsen (born 1980), an actress
- Alejandro Fuentes (born 1987), a singer
- Frida Aasen, (born 1994), a fashion model
- Thea Sofie Loch Næss (born 1996), an actress
- Helene Abildsnes, (Norwegian Wiki) (born 1998) Miss Universe Norway 2019

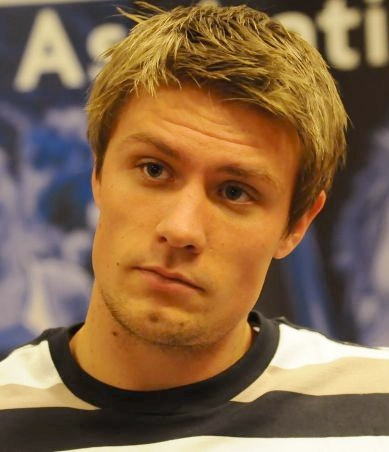
Andreas Thorkildsen, 2008

=== Sport ===
- Gunn Margit Andreassen (born 1973), a former biathlete who twice was an Olympic relay team medallist
- Steinar Pedersen (born 1975), a former footballer with 426 club caps
- Katrine Lunde (born 1980), a handball goalkeeper with 305 caps with Norway women
- twins Katrine Lunde & Kristine Lunde-Borgersen, (born 1980), handball players who were twice Olympic champions
- Andreas Thorkildsen (born 1982), a javelin thrower and Olympic gold medallist in 2004 and 2008
- Kristoffer Hæstad (born 1983), a former footballer with over 300 club caps and 27 for Norway
- Sondre Tronstad (born 1995), a professional footballer for Blackburn Rovers

== See also ==
- Fortifications of Kristiansand
- Kristiansands Stiftsavis og Adressekontors-Efterretninger
- List of boroughs of Kristiansand
- List of lighthouses in Norway
- Sørlandet
