= Rige (Kristiansand) =

- Neighborhood in Kristiansand
- Interactive map of Rige
- Coordinates: 58.1392°N 07.9425°E
- Country: Norway
- County: Agder
- Municipality: Kristiansand
- Borough: Grim
- District: Hellemyr
- Elevation: 67 m (220 ft)
- Time zone: UTC+01:00 (CET)
  - Summer (DST): UTC+02:00 (CEST)
- Postal code: 4628
- Area code: 38

Rige is a neighbourhood in the city of Kristiansand in Agder county, Norway. It is located in the borough of Grim and in the district of Hellemyr. Rige lies on the south side of the European route E39 highway, just south of Hellemyrtoppen and north of Øvre Slettheia. The area is mostly an industrial/commercial area.

== Transportation ==
Roads through Rige
Road	Stretch
E39	Hannevika - Stavanger

Bus lines serving Rige
Line	Destinations
17	Hellemyr - Tømmerstø
17	Hellemyr - Tømmerstø-Frikstad
17	Hellemyr - Kvadraturen
18	Hellemyr - Tømmerstø Odderhei-Holte
18	Hellemyr - Dvergsnes
N16	Hellemyr - Tinnheia - Kvadraturen
40/42	Kristiansand - Søgne
45/46	Kristiansand - Songdalen
230	Kristiansand - Åseral
900	Kristiansand - Mandal
900	Kristiansand - Farsund-Lista
