= Tinnheia sørvest =

- Neighborhood in Kristiansand
- Interactive map of Tinnheia sørvest
- Coordinates: 58.1442°N 07.9539°E
- Country: Norway
- County: Agder
- Municipality: Kristiansand
- Borough: Grim
- District: Tinnheia
- Time zone: UTC+01:00 (CET)
  - Summer (DST): UTC+02:00 (CEST)
- Postal code: 4629
- Area code: 38

Tinnheia sørvest is a neighbourhood in the city of Kristiansand in Agder county, Norway. It is located in the borough of Grim and in the district of Tinnheia. Tinnheia sørvest lies between the neighbourhoods of Hannevikåsen and Koboltveien. It is south of Tinnheia torv.
