= Eigevannskollen =

- Neighborhood in Kristiansand
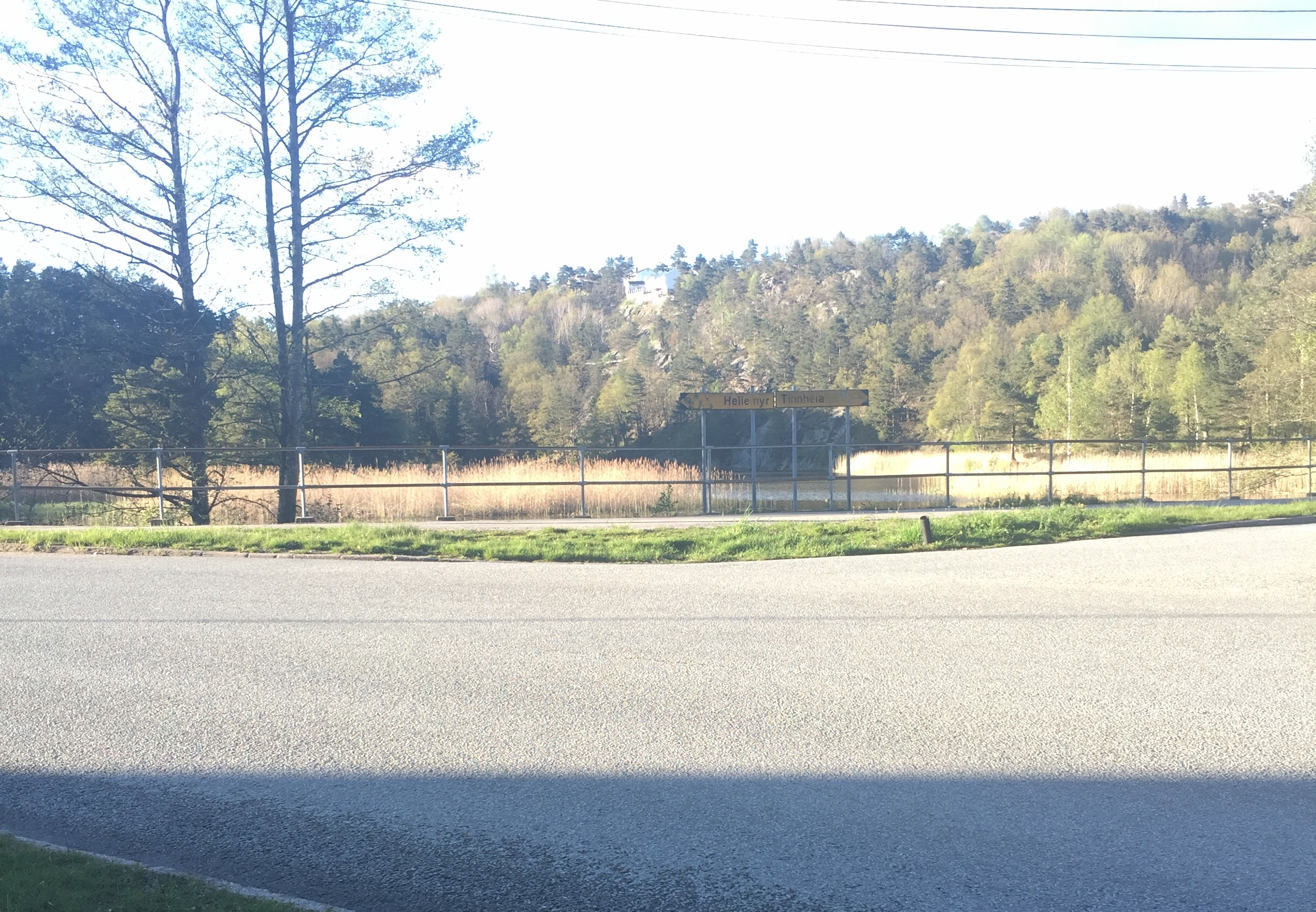
- View of the neighborhood
- Interactive map of Eigevannskollen
- Coordinates: 58.1389°N 07.9527°E
- Country: Norway
- County: Agder
- Municipality: Kristiansand
- Borough: Grim
- District: Tinnheia
- Elevation: 53 m (174 ft)
- Time zone: UTC+01:00 (CET)
  - Summer (DST): UTC+02:00 (CEST)
- Postal code: 4629
- Area code: 38

Eigevannskollen is a neighbourhood in the city of Kristiansand in Agder county, Norway. It is located in the borough of Grim and in the district of Tinnheia. It is located south of the lake Eigevann in Tinnheia and next to Hellemyr. Eigevann is north of the European route E39 highway and the neighbourhood is west of Hannevikåsen.

Bus lines from Eigevannskollen
Line	Destination
15	Tinnheia - Kvadraturen
17	Hellemyr - Tømmerstø
17	Hellemyr - Tømmerstø-Frikstad
17	Hellemyr - Kvadraturen
18	Hellemyr - Tømmerstø Odderhei-Holte
18	Hellemyr - Dvergsnes
N16	Hellemyr - Tinnheia - Kvadraturen
