= Hellemyrtoppen =

- Neighborhood in Kristiansand
- Interactive map of Hellemyrtoppen
- Coordinates: 58.1439°N 07.9396°E
- Country: Norway
- County: Agder
- Municipality: Kristiansand
- Borough: Grim
- District: Hellemyr
- Elevation: 117 m (384 ft)
- Time zone: UTC+01:00 (CET)
  - Summer (DST): UTC+02:00 (CEST)
- Postal code: 4628
- Area code: 38

Hellemyrtoppen is a neighbourhood in the city of Kristiansand in Agder county, Norway. It is located in the borough of Grim and in the district of Hellemyr. Hellemyrtoppen is located just north of the European route E39 highway. It is north of Rige, east of Vestheiene, and west of Fjellro.

== Transportation ==
Roads through Vestheiene:
Road	Stretch
E39	Hannevika - Stavanger

Bus lines through Vestheiene:
Line	Destinations
17	Hellemyr - Tømmerstø
17	Hellemyr - Tømmerstø-Frikstad
17	Hellemyr - Kvadraturen
18	Hellemyr - Tømmerstø Odderhei-Holte
18	Hellemyr - Dvergsnes
N16	Hellemyr - Tinnheia - Kvadraturen
