= Fagervoll =

- Neighborhood in Kristiansand
- Interactive map of Fagervoll
- Coordinates: 58.1479°N 07.9652°E
- Country: Norway
- County: Agder
- Municipality: Kristiansand
- Borough: Grim
- District: Grim
- Elevation: 21 m (69 ft)
- Time zone: UTC+01:00 (CET)
  - Summer (DST): UTC+02:00 (CEST)
- Postal code: 4616
- Area code: 38

Fagervoll is a neighbourhood in the city of Kristiansand in Agder county, Norway. It is located in the borough of Grim and in the district of Grim. It is located north of Kolsberg, west of Idda, and southeast of Elisenhøy.
