= Fidjemoen =

- Neighborhood in Kristiansand
- Interactive map of Fidjemoen
- Coordinates: 58.1457°N 07.9183°E
- Country: Norway
- County: Agder
- Municipality: Kristiansand
- Borough: Grim
- District: Hellemyr
- Elevation: 90 m (300 ft)
- Time zone: UTC+01:00 (CET)
  - Summer (DST): UTC+02:00 (CEST)
- Postal code: 4628
- Area code: 38

Fidjemoen is a neighbourhood in the city of Kristiansand in Agder county, Norway. It is located in the borough of Grim and in the district of Hellemyr. It is located on the north side of the European route E39 highway. It lies at the western side of the district, west of Vestheiene and south of Solkollen.

== Transportation ==
Roads through Fidjemoen
| Road | Stretch |
|---|---|
| E39 | Hannevika - Stavanger |

Bus lines through Fidjemoen
| Line | Destinations |
|---|---|
| 40 | |
| 42 | |
| 45 | |
| 46 | |
| 200 | |
| 230 | |
