= Solkollen =

- Neighborhood in Kristiansand
- Interactive map of Solkollen
- Coordinates: 58.1518°N 07.9323°E
- Country: Norway
- County: Agder
- Municipality: Kristiansand
- Borough: Grim
- District: Hellemyr
- Elevation: 68 m (223 ft)
- Time zone: UTC+01:00 (CET)
  - Summer (DST): UTC+02:00 (CEST)
- Postal code: 4628
- Area code: 38

Solkollen is a neighbourhood in the city of Kristiansand in Agder county, Norway. It is located in the borough of Grim and in the district of Hellemyr. Solkollen is located to the north of Breimyr, to the west of the lake Eigevann, and to the north of Vestheiene.

== Transportation ==
Roads through Solkollen:
Road	Stretch
E39	Hannevika - Stavanger

Bus lines through Solkollen:
Line	Destinations
17	Hellemyr - Tømmerstø
17	Hellemyr - Tømmerstø-Frikstad
17	Hellemyr - Kvadraturen
18	Hellemyr - Tømmerstø Odderhei-Holte
18	Hellemyr - Dvergsnes
N16	Hellemyr - Tinnheia - Kvadraturen
