= Elisenhøy =

- Neighborhood in Kristiansand
- Interactive map of Elisenhøy
- Coordinates: 58.1510°N 07.9618°E
- Country: Norway
- County: Agder
- Municipality: Kristiansand
- Borough: Grim
- District: Grim
- Elevation: 36 m (118 ft)
- Time zone: UTC+01:00 (CET)
  - Summer (DST): UTC+02:00 (CEST)
- Postal code: 4617
- Area code: 38

Elisenhøy is a neighbourhood in the city of Kristiansand in Agder county, Norway. It is located in the borough of Grim and in the district of Grim. It is located on the south side of the Norwegian National Road 9, east of Klappane and Grim torv, northwest of Fagervoll, and south of Krossen.

Roads through Elisenhøy
Line	Destination
Norwegian National Road 9	Kristiansand - Evje

Buses through Elisenhøy
Line	Destination
19	Suldalen - Kvadraturen
30	Vennesla - Kvadraturen
32	Høietun - Kvadraturen
221	Hovden - Kristiansand
501	Evje - Kristiansand
