= Bellevue (Kristiansand) =

- Neighborhood in Kristiansand
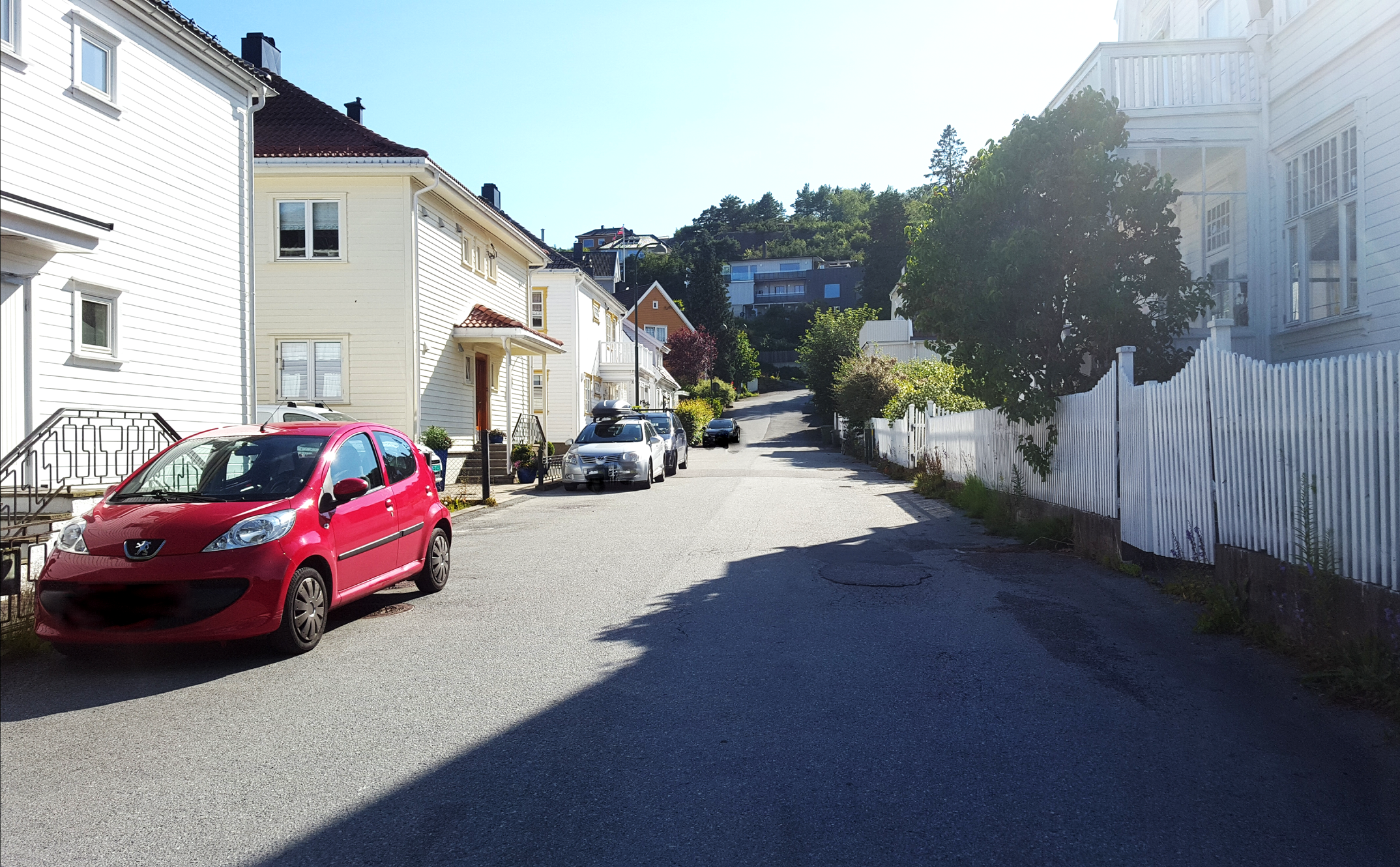
- View of the neighborhood
- Interactive map of Bellevue
- Coordinates: 58.1441°N 07.9777°E
- Country: Norway
- County: Agder
- Municipality: Kristiansand
- Borough: Grim
- District: Grim
- Time zone: UTC+01:00 (CET)
  - Summer (DST): UTC+02:00 (CEST)
- Postal code: 4616
- Area code: 38

Bellevue is a neighbourhood in the city of Kristiansand in Agder county, Norway. It is located in the borough of Grim and in the district of Grim. Bellevue is southeast of Idda. The European route E18 highway runs along the east side of the neighborhood and the Norwegian National Road 9 runs just north of the neighborhood. The National Archives of Norway in Kristiansand is located in Bellevue.

== Transport ==
Roads through Bellevue
Line	Destination
European Route E18	Bellevue - Kvadraturen - Oslo
European route E39	Kristiansand Harbour - Bellevue - Stavanger

Buses through Bellevue
Line	Destination	Info
D2	Voiebyen - Kvadraturen	Direct route
D3	Slettheia - Kvadraturen	Direct route
M1	Flekkerøy - Sørlandsparken-Dyreparken-IKEA	
M1	Flekkerøy - Kvadraturen	
M1	Flekkerøy - Dyreparken	Summer-season only
M2	Voiebyen - Hånes	
M2	Voiebyen - Hånes-Lauvåsen	
M2	Voiebyen - Hånes-Kjevik/Tveit	Sundays only
M2	Voiebyen - Kvadraturen	The last route
M3	Slettheia - Søm	
05	Andøya - Kvadraturen	
05	Andøya - Kvadraturen-UiA	Rush-hour
09	Bråvann - Kvadraturen	
09	Bråvann - Kvadraturen-UiA	Rush-hour
12	Kjos Haveby - Eg-Sykehuset	
17	Hellemyr - Tømmerstø	
17	Hellemyr - Tømmerstø-Frikstad	
17	Hellemyr - Kvadraturen	
18	Hellemyr - Tømmerstø-Odderhei Holte	
40	Kristiansand - Søgne (Høllen-Årosskogen)	
42	Kristiansand - Søgne (Langenes)	
45	Kristiansand - Nodelandsheia	
45	Kristiansand - Nodelansheia-Stokkeland	
46	Kristiansand - Nodeland-Finsland	
900	Kristiansand - Mandal	
900	Kristiansand - Mandal o/ Møll	
900	Kristiansand - Mandal-Lindesnes-Lyngdal-Farsund-Lista	Collaborate with bus to Flekkefjord and Kvinesdal
