= Vestheiene =

- Neighborhood in Kristiansand
- Interactive map of Vestheiene
- Coordinates: 58.1474°N 07.9299°E
- Country: Norway
- County: Agder
- Municipality: Kristiansand
- Borough: Grim
- District: Hellemyr
- Time zone: UTC+01:00 (CET)
  - Summer (DST): UTC+02:00 (CEST)
- Postal code: 4628
- Area code: 38

Vestheiene is a neighbourhood in the city of Kristiansand in Agder county, Norway. It is located in the borough of Grim and in the district of Hellemyr. Vestheiene is located to the east of Breimyr and west of Hellemyrtoppen. Solkollen lies to the north of Vestheiene.

== Transportation ==
Roads through Vestheiene:
Road	Stretch
E39	Hannevika - Stavanger

Bus lines through Vestheiene:
Line	Destinations
17	Hellemyr - Tømmerstø
17	Hellemyr - Tømmerstø-Frikstad
17	Hellemyr - Kvadraturen
18	Hellemyr - Tømmerstø Odderhei-Holte
18	Hellemyr - Dvergsnes
N16	Hellemyr - Tinnheia - Kvadraturen
