= Ravnedalen =

Ravnedalen may refer to:

- Ravnedalen, Kristiansand is a park in Kristiansand, Norway
- Ravnedalen on the island Bornholm, Denmark
