= Idda (Kristiansand) =

- Neighborhood in Kristiansand
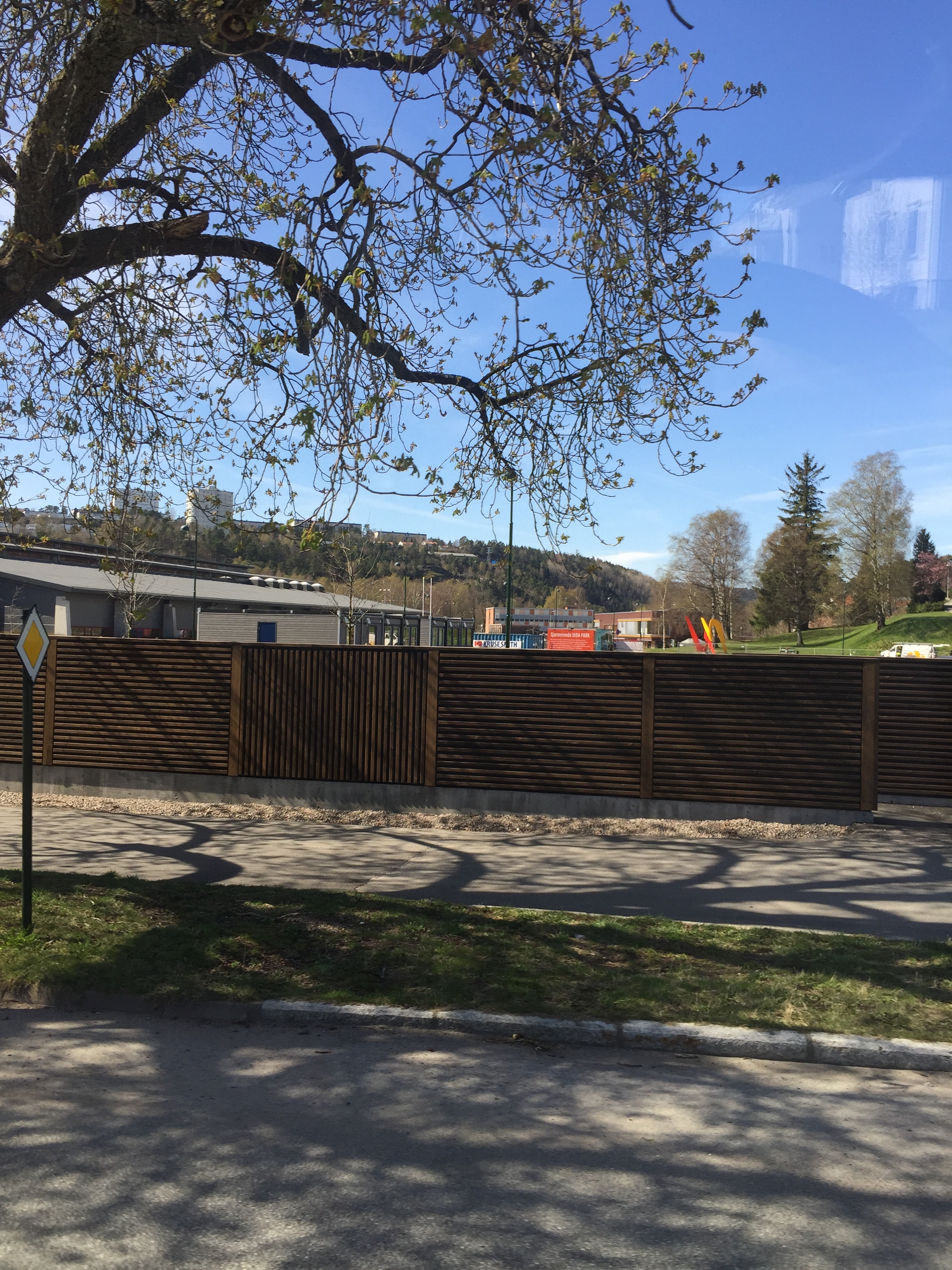
- View of the neighborhood
- Interactive map of Idda
- Coordinates: 58.1479°N 07.9752°E
- Country: Norway
- County: Agder
- Municipality: Kristiansand
- Borough: Grim
- District: Grim
- Time zone: UTC+01:00 (CET)
  - Summer (DST): UTC+02:00 (CEST)
- Postal code: 4616
- Area code: 38

Idda is a neighbourhood in the city of Kristiansand in Agder county, Norway. It is located in the borough of Grim and in the district of Grim. It is located northwest of Bellevue, east of Kolsberg and southwest of Grim torv. Idda is near Grim Junior High and Solholmen Elementary.

Buses through Idda
Line	Destination
15	Tinnheia - Kvadraturen
N16	Hellemyr - Tinnheia - Kvadraturen

== History ==
The Idda Arena (opened on 3 September 2011) is a multi-purpose hall that consists of ice hockey, curling, a sports hall, martial arts, fencing dance and a gym. Adjacent to the Arena, is a skate park and football pitch. It replaced the Idda Idrettsplassen, an outdoor sports field used for skating, football (first used in 1924) and athletics.

The Norwegian Individual Speedway Championship (motorcycle speedway) was held at Idda Idrettsplassen in 1960.
