= Tinnheia nord =

- Neighborhood in Kristiansand
- Interactive map of Tinnheia nord
- Coordinates: 58.1484°N 07.9518°E
- Country: Norway
- County: Agder
- Municipality: Kristiansand
- Borough: Grim
- District: Tinnheia
- Time zone: UTC+01:00 (CET)
  - Summer (DST): UTC+02:00 (CEST)
- Postal code: 4629
- Area code: 38

Tinnheia nord is a neighbourhood in the city of Kristiansand in Agder county, Norway. It is located in the borough of Grim and in the district of Tinnheia. Tinnheia nord is north of Tinnheia torv.
