= Kolsdalen =

- Neighborhood in Kristiansand
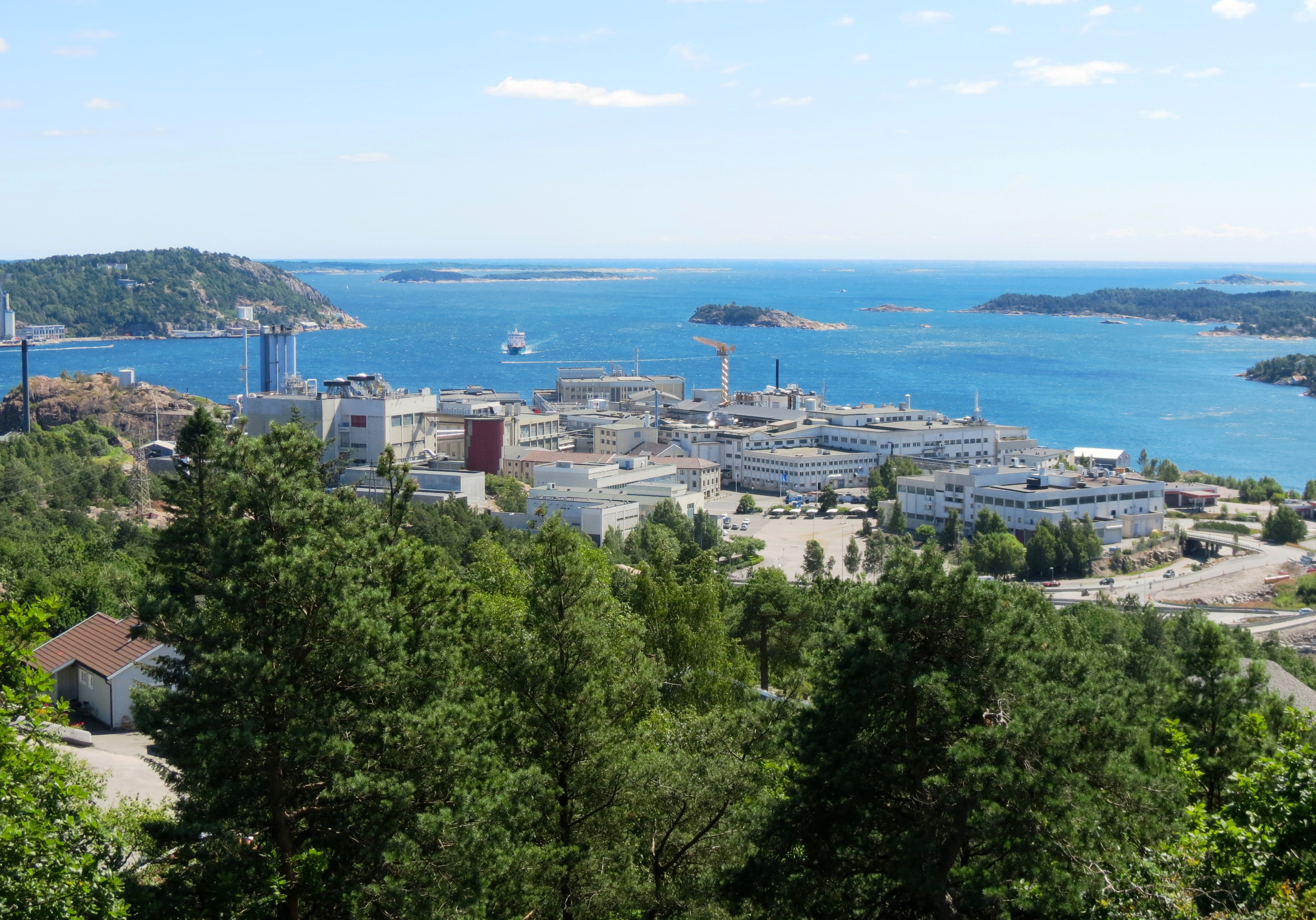
- View of the neighborhood
- Interactive map of Kolsdalen
- Coordinates: 58.1394°N 07.9661°E
- Country: Norway
- County: Agder
- Municipality: Kristiansand
- Borough: Grim
- District: Tinnheia
- Time zone: UTC+01:00 (CET)
  - Summer (DST): UTC+02:00 (CEST)
- Postal code: 4629
- Area code: 38

Kolsdalen is a neighbourhood in the city of Kristiansand in Agder county, Norway. It is located in the borough of Grim and in the district of Tinnheia. It lies along the European route E39 highway, south of Kolsberg and east of Hannevika.
