= Grim Church =

Church in Agder, Norway

- Grim kirke
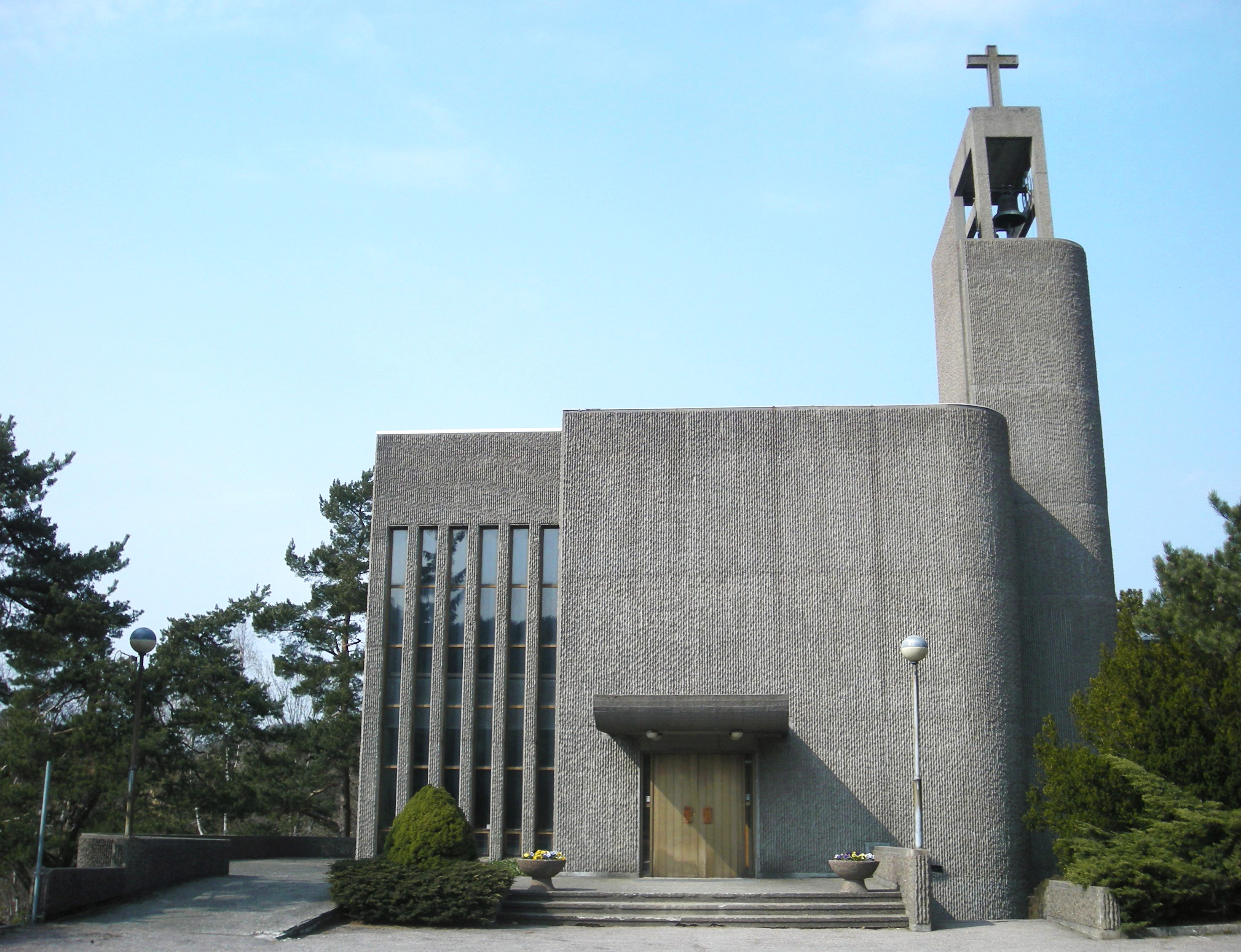
- View of the church
- Grim Church
- 58.1480°N 07.9724°E
- Location: Kristiansand Municipality, Agder
- Country: Norway
- Denomination: Church of Norway
- Churchmanship: Evangelical Lutheran

History
- Status: Parish church
- Founded: 1969
- Consecrated: 1969

Architecture
- Functional status: Active
- Architect: Alv Erikstad
- Architectural type: Long church
- Completed: 1969 (57 years ago)

Specifications
- Capacity: 385
- Materials: Concrete

Administration
- Diocese: Agder og Telemark
- Deanery: Kristiansand domprosti
- Parish: Grim
- Norwegian Cultural Heritage Site
- Type: Church
- Status: Listed
- ID: 84421

Grim Church (Norwegian: Grim kirke) is a parish church of the Church of Norway in Kristiansand Municipality in Agder county, Norway. It is located in the borough of Grim in the city of Kristiansand, just northwest of the city centre. It is the church for the Grim parish which is part of the Kristiansand domprosti (arch-deanery) in the Diocese of Agder og Telemark. The gray, concrete church was built in a long church design in 1969 using plans drawn up by the architect Alv Erikstad who was the city architect at that time. The church seats about 385 people.

== Media gallery ==
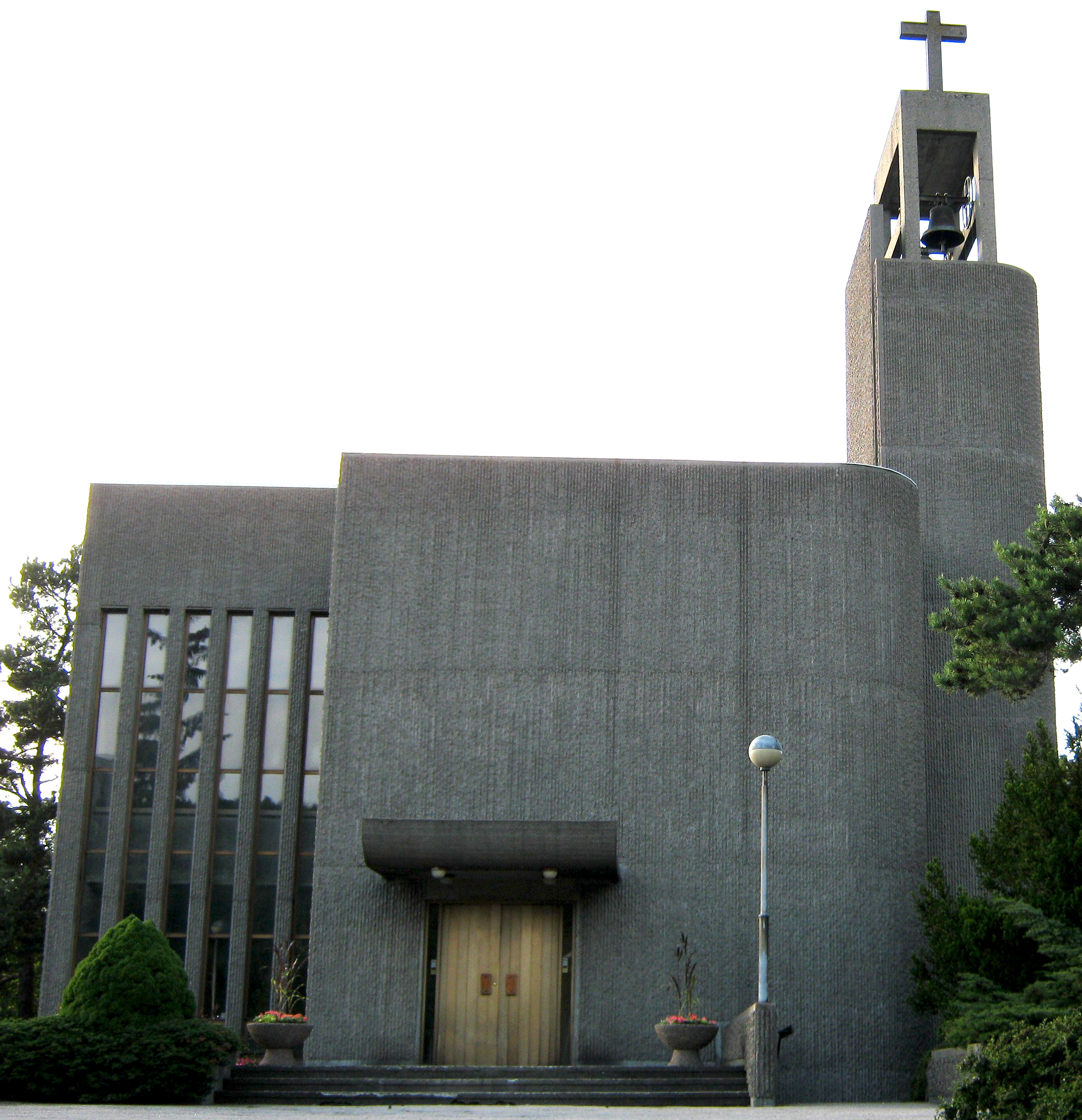

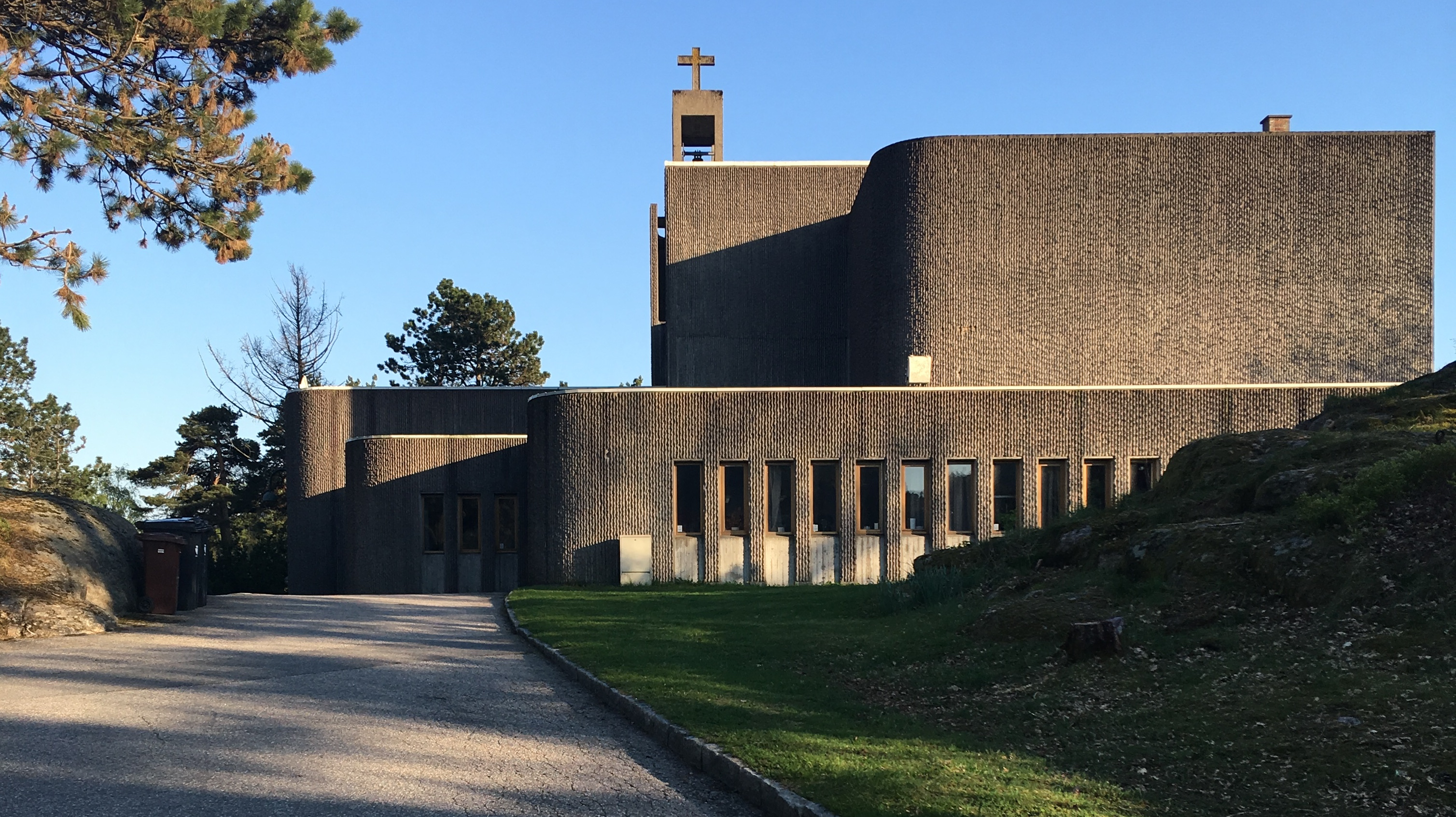

== See also ==
- List of churches in Agder og Telemark
