= Tinnheia torv =

- Neighborhood in Kristiansand
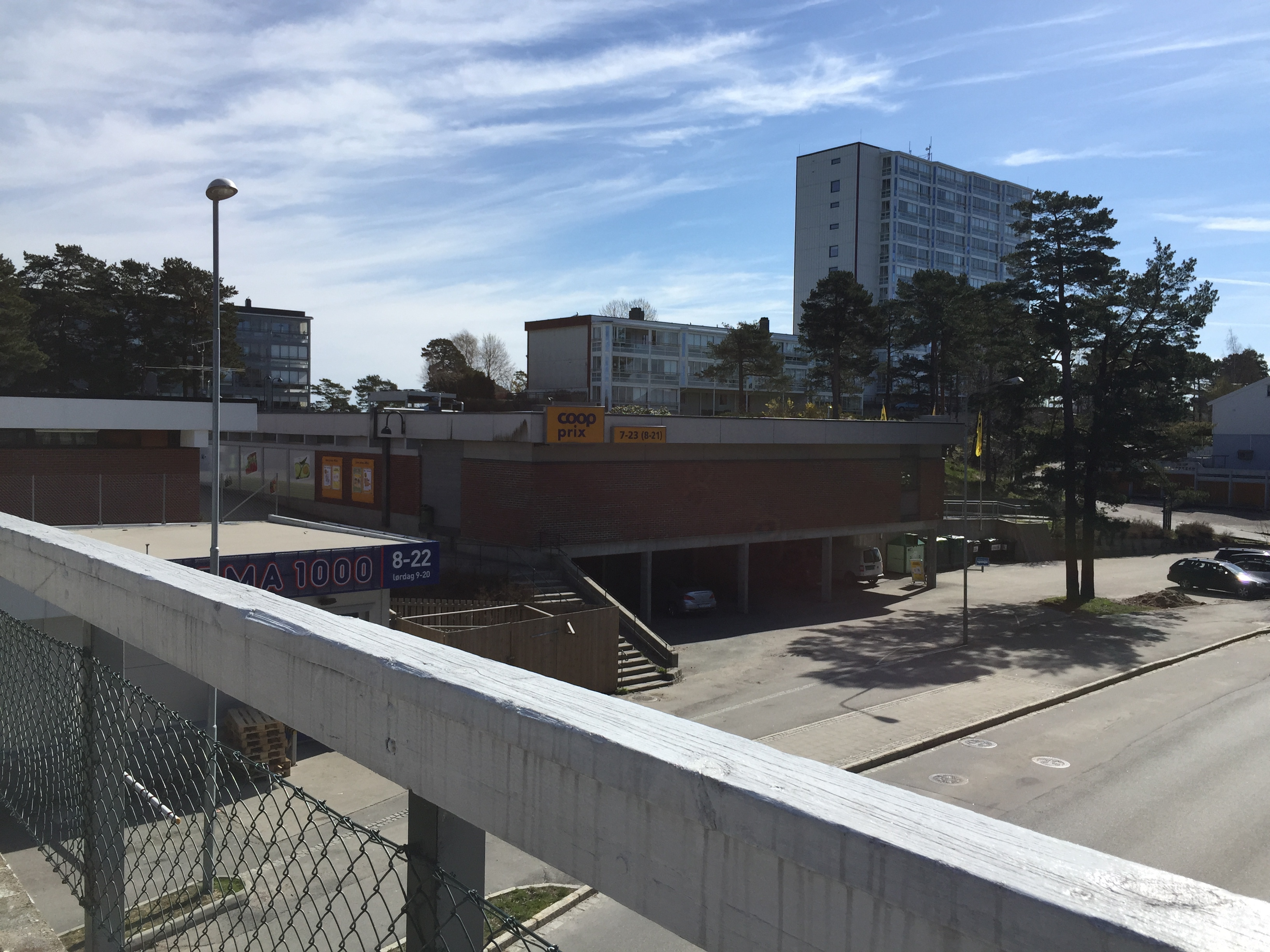
- View of the neighborhood
- Interactive map of Tinnheia torv
- Coordinates: 58.1465°N 07.9562°E
- Country: Norway
- County: Agder
- Municipality: Kristiansand
- Borough: Grim
- District: Tinnheia
- Time zone: UTC+01:00 (CET)
  - Summer (DST): UTC+02:00 (CEST)
- Postal code: 4629
- Area code: 38

Tinnheia torv is a neighbourhood in the city of Kristiansand in Agder county, Norway. It is located in the borough of Grim and in the district of Tinnheia. Tinnheia torv is the "centrum" of the district and it is located west of Kolsåsen, east of Koboltveien, and south of Tinnheia nord. There is an elementary school located there and it mostly consists of apartment buildings.
