= Hannevikåsen =

- Neighborhood in Kristiansand
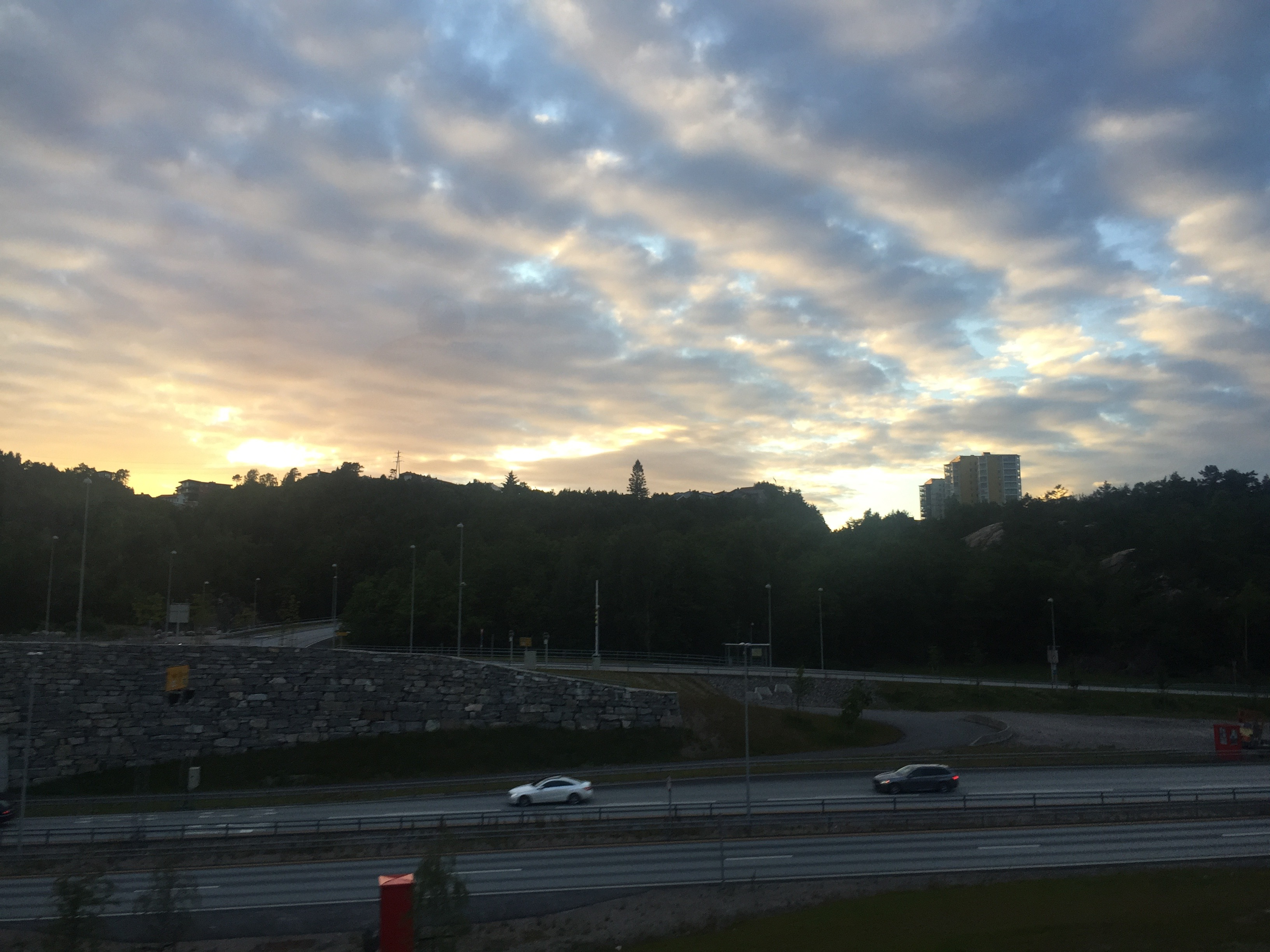
- View of the neighborhood
- Interactive map of Hannevikåsen
- Coordinates: 58.1390°N 07.9614°E
- Country: Norway
- County: Agder
- Municipality: Kristiansand
- Borough: Grim
- District: Tinnheia
- Time zone: UTC+01:00 (CET)
  - Summer (DST): UTC+02:00 (CEST)
- Postal code: 4629
- Area code: 38

Hannevikåsen is a neighbourhood in the city of Kristiansand in Agder county, Norway. It is located in the borough of Grim and in the district of Tinnheia. It lies up the hill from Hannevika and Kolsdalen. The European route E39 highway runs underneath the south end of the neighborhood.

Bus lines from Hannevikåsen
Line	Destination
15	Tinnheia - Kvadraturen
N16	Hellemyr - Tinnheia - Kvadraturen
