= Kongshavn, Kristiansand =

Kongshavn
- Neighborhood in Kristiansand
- Interactive map of Kongshavn
- Coordinates: 58.1171°N 08.1134°E
- Country: Norway
- County: Agder
- Municipality: Kristiansand
- Borough: Oddernes
- District: Randesund
- Elevation: 6 m (20 ft)
- Time zone: UTC+01:00 (CET)
  - Summer (DST): UTC+02:00 (CEST)
- Postal code: 4639
- Area code: 38

Kongshavn is a neighbourhood in the city of Kristiansand in Agder county, Norway. It's located in the borough of Oddernes and in the district of Randesund. The neighborhood of Frikstad lies to the north and Tømmerstø lies to the northwest. Kongshavn Pier is a large harbor with connections to islands outside of Randesund.

Bus lines from Kongshavn
Line	Destination
08	Rona - Kongshavn
17	Hellemyr - Tømmerstø - Frikstad
