= Høietun =

- Neighbourhood in Kristiansand
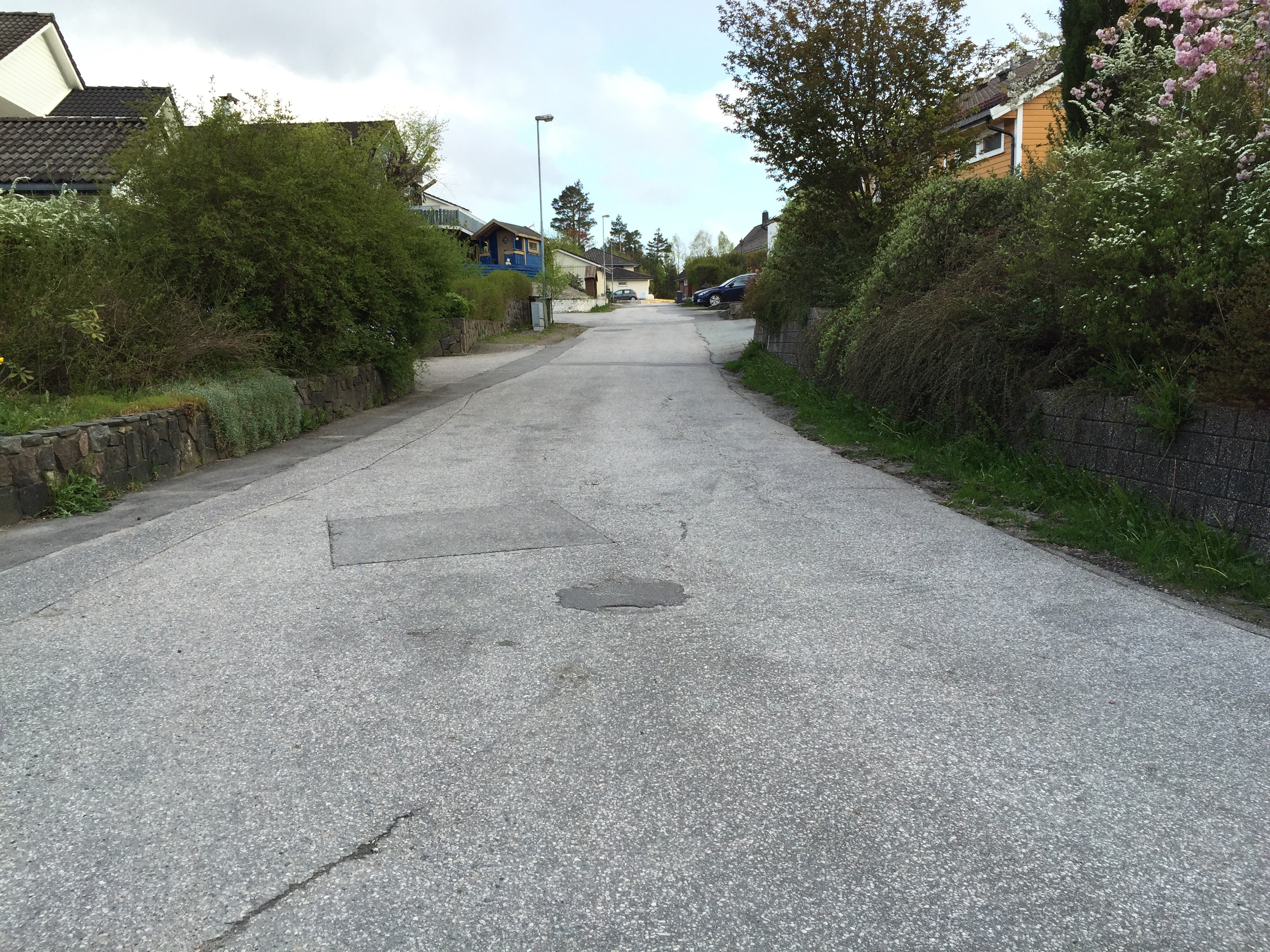
- Interactive map of Høietun
- Coordinates: 58.2205°N 7.9118°E
- Country: Norway
- County: Vest-Agder
- City: Kristiansand
- District: Mosby
- Borough: Grim

Population (2014)
  - Total: 500
- ZIP code: 4619
- Area code: 38

Høietun is a neighbourhood in the north of Kristiansand, Norway. It is a part of the Grim borough at Mosby. The neighborhood is a part of the Vennesla suburbs.

== See also ==
- Mosby
- Vennesla
