= Baneheia =

Nature area in Kristiansand, Agder, Norway

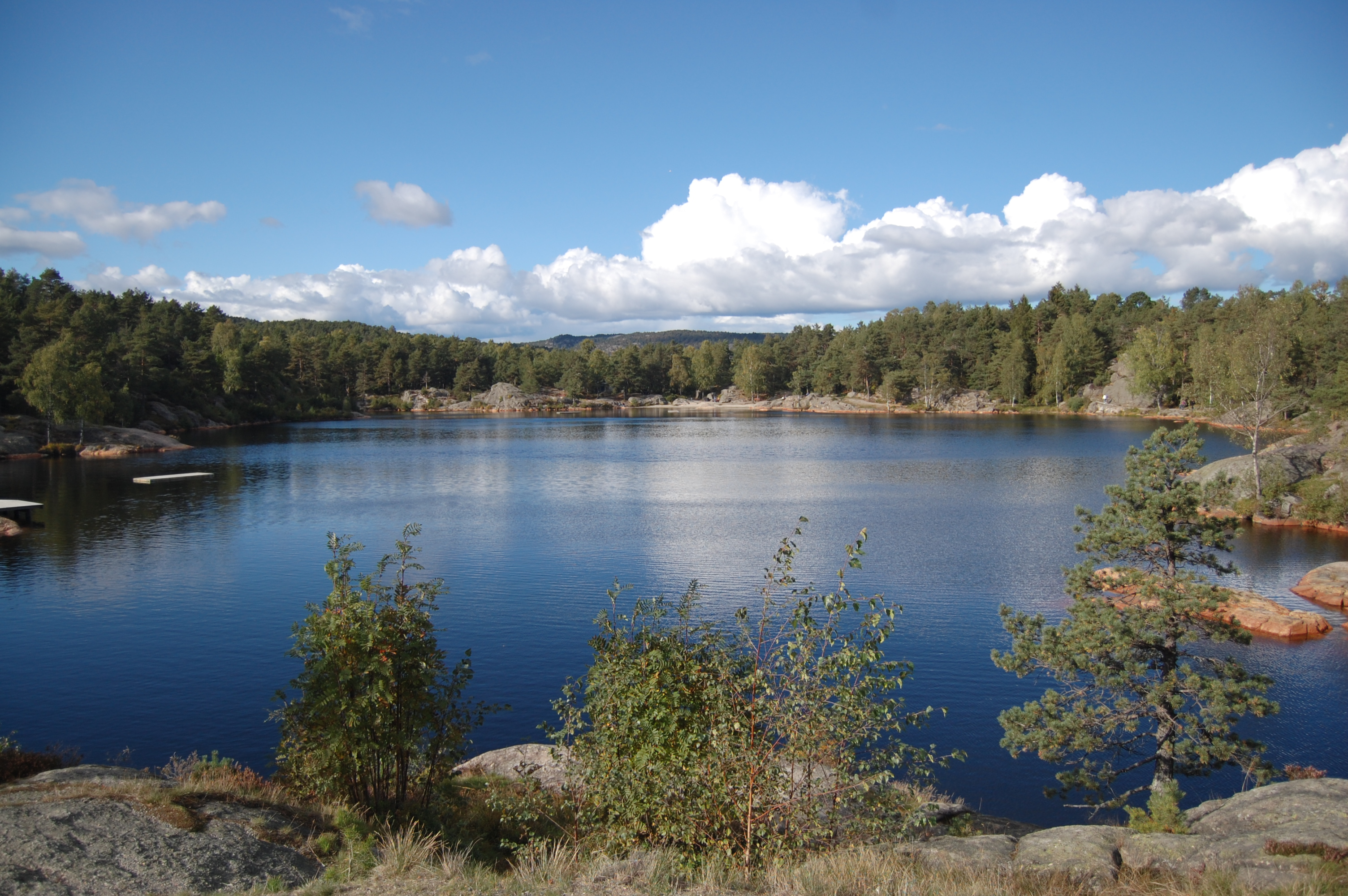
- 3. Stampe, a lake in Baneheia
- Interactive map of Baneheia
- Nearest city: Kristiansand
- Coordinates: 58.15367°N 7.98586°E
- Owner: Kristiansand Municipality
- Status: Open

Baneheia is a recreational area in Kristiansand Municipality in Agder county, Norway. The park is mostly known at the national level from the Baneheia case as the scene of a notorious murder of two girls ages 8 and 10 that took place in 2000. The area lies just north of the centre of the city of Kristiansand and it has hills, lakes, and forest. The Ravnedalen Park lies just to the northwest of Baneheia. The Baneheia area was given to the citizens of Kristiansand by King Christian IV of Denmark–Norway when the city was founded in 1641.

== Recreational area ==
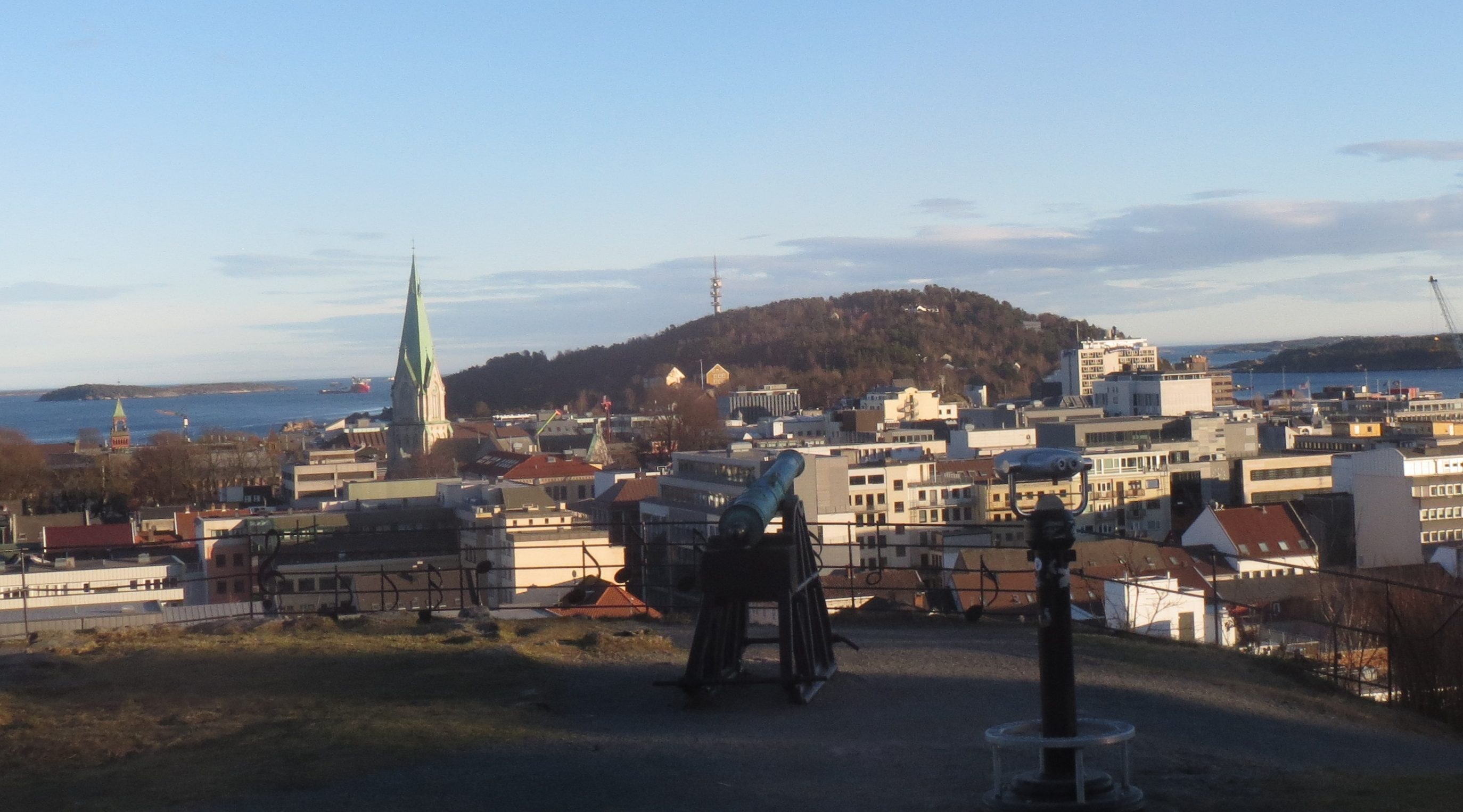
Drageknatten, a viewpoint with magnificent views of the city.

The lake called '3. stampe' or 'Stampa' is a popular swimming lake with a couple of small beaches and nice water temperatures during summer. On the "Drageknatten" hill, you can get nice views of the city center and the docks. Baneheia is used for hiking or jogging during spring, summer, and autumn and can be used for skiing during winter if there's enough snow. Many different species of birds can be found in Baneheia, along with lighted trails. Some parts of the area are even accessible by wheelchair users.

== History ==
Baneheia used to be quite a sad view, as the trees were gone because of the inhabitants' need of wood. In the 1800s, general Joseph Frantz Oscar Wergeland used soldiers from the city's garrison to plant trees, build stairs, trails, etc. and made Baneheia into what it is today.

=== Baneheia murders ===
The area is also known for the infamous double murder incident which occurred in May 2000. Two young girls were raped and murdered close by the '3. Stampe' lake and their bodies hidden in the adjacent woods. The case sent shock-waves through Norwegian society and the name "Baneheia" is primarily associated with the crimes rather than the area, at least in areas outside of Kristiansand. However, Baneheia is now safe and a peaceful area.
