= Koboltveien =

- Neighborhood in Kristiansand
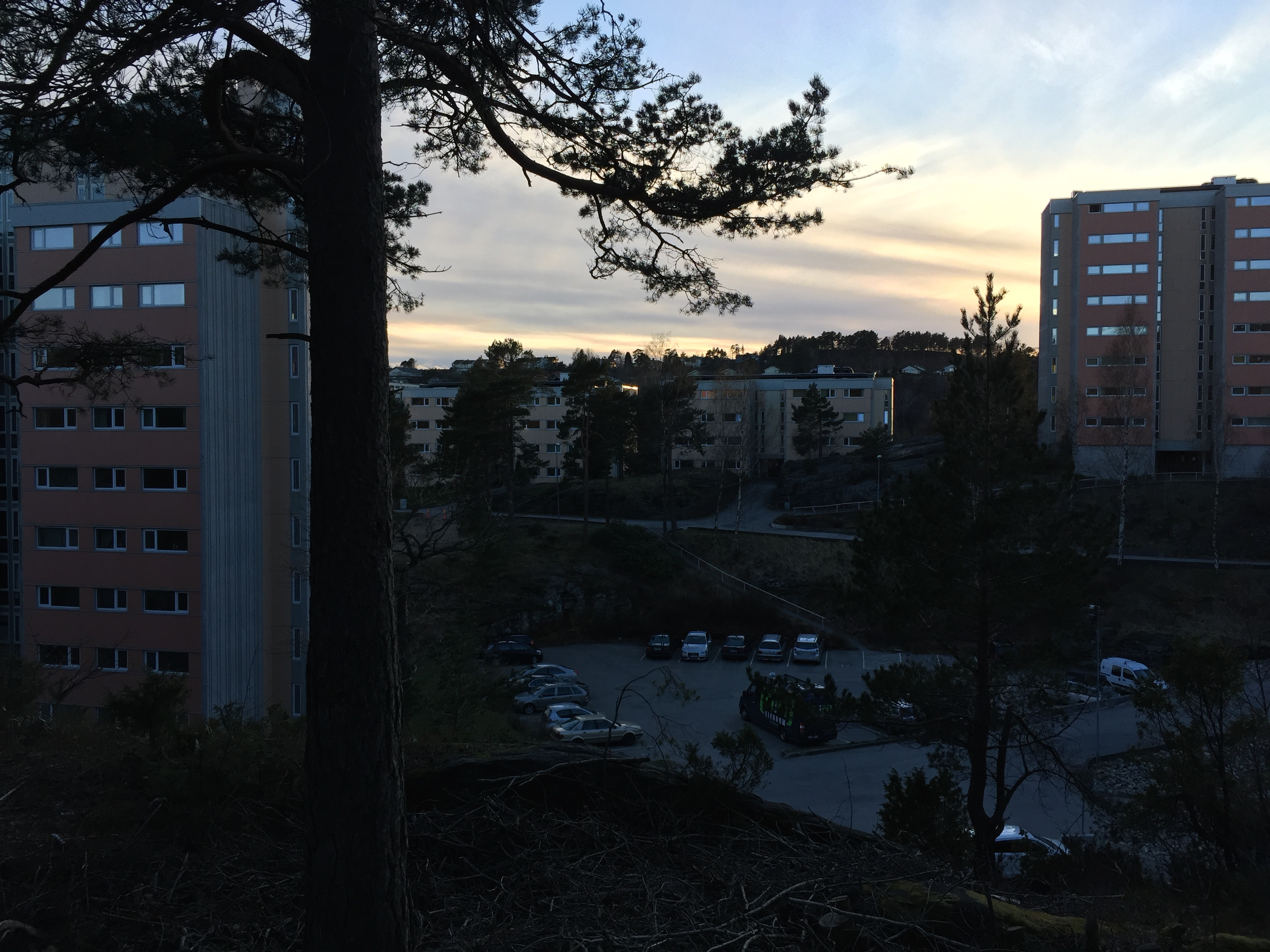
- View of the neighborhood
- Interactive map of Koboltveien
- Coordinates: 58.1453°N 07.9488°E
- Country: Norway
- County: Agder
- Municipality: Kristiansand
- Borough: Grim
- District: Tinnheia
- Elevation: 72 m (236 ft)
- Time zone: UTC+01:00 (CET)
  - Summer (DST): UTC+02:00 (CEST)
- Postal code: 4629
- Area code: 38

Koboltveien is a neighbourhood in the city of Kristiansand in Agder county, Norway. It is located in the borough of Grim and in the district of Tinnheia. It mostly consists of apartments and it is close to the lake Eigevann. The Tinnheia torv neighborhood lies next to Kolboltveien.
