= Ravnedalen, Kristiansand =

Park in Kristiansand, Norway

Ravnedalen
- Interactive map of Ravnedalen
- Location: Kristiansand Municipality, Norway
- Coordinates: 58°09′20″N 7°58′23″E
- Created: 1878
- Status: Open all year

Ravnedalen is a park in Kristiansand Municipality in Agder county, Norway. The part is located in the borough of Grim, north of the centre of the city of Kristiansand, just to the northeast of the Baneheia recreation area. The park was constructed from 1874–1878 by military soldiers under the command of Colonel, later Major General, Joseph Frantz Oscar Wergeland.

== History ==
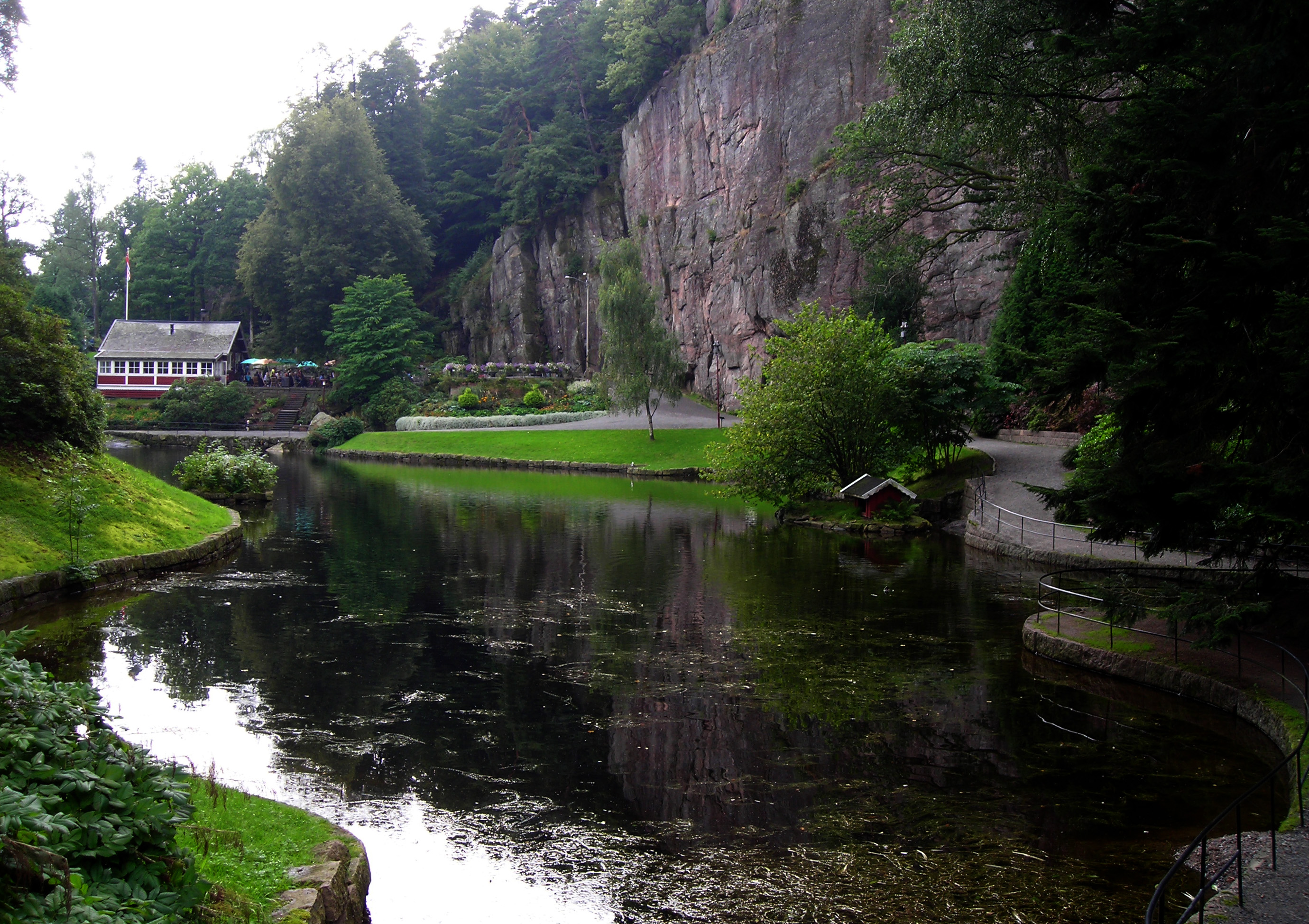
Ravnedalen. The cafè is in the background

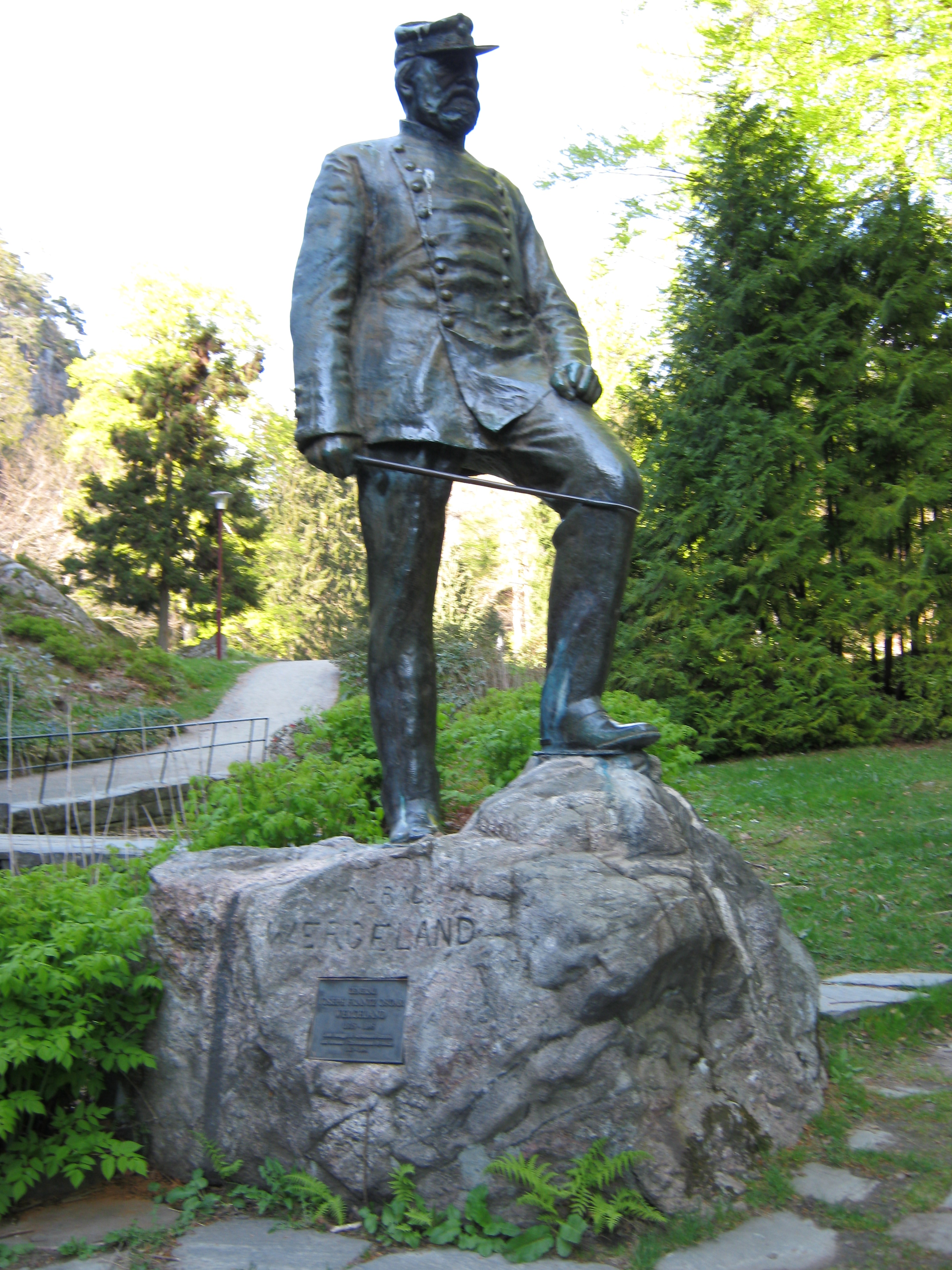
Statue of Major General Wergeland in Ravnedalen, by sculptor Gustav Lærum

Ravnedalen was the former billeting area called Grimsmoen, which had room for about 1,200 soldiers. In the 1860s, the military camp was moved to Gimlemoen. There were plans for using the old camp area as a rifle range, but Colonel Wergeland protested and insisted that the area would be perfect for a pleasure garden. In 1872 Byselskabet, where Wergeland was a chairman, applied for fundings, and the park was constructed during 1874–1878, by soldiers with spades instead of weapons.

== Construction ==
The park was constructed as a romantic garden, in a valley with dramatic cliffs and waterfalls. A dam fointaine was built with natural pressure support from the nearby lake Baanetjønn. The garden has open areas for public arrangements like concerts, gatherings and festivals. The former gardener house is today used as a café. There used to be apes and peacocks, while today ducks and swans dominate the lakes. Some of Norway's largest spruce trees, planted around 1875, are found in the park. Exotic plants were imported and planted, like rhododendron, magnolia, mimosa, yew and cypress.

== Culture ==
In the 1880s and 1890s the area was used for public feasts. Today, Ravnedalen is one of Kristiansand's cultural sites, where concerts and other arrangements are held regularly. The location has a capacity of 5,000 spectators in front of the outdoor stage.

Gustav Lærum's 1917 bronze statue of Wergeland is located in Ravnedalen.

The granite rock faces that form the backdrop of the park is a popular venue for rock climbers. Ravnedalen has about 70 established climbing routes. The selection of routes spans several grades and comprise bolted, partially bolted and traditionally protected climbs.
