= Joseph Frantz Oscar Wergeland =

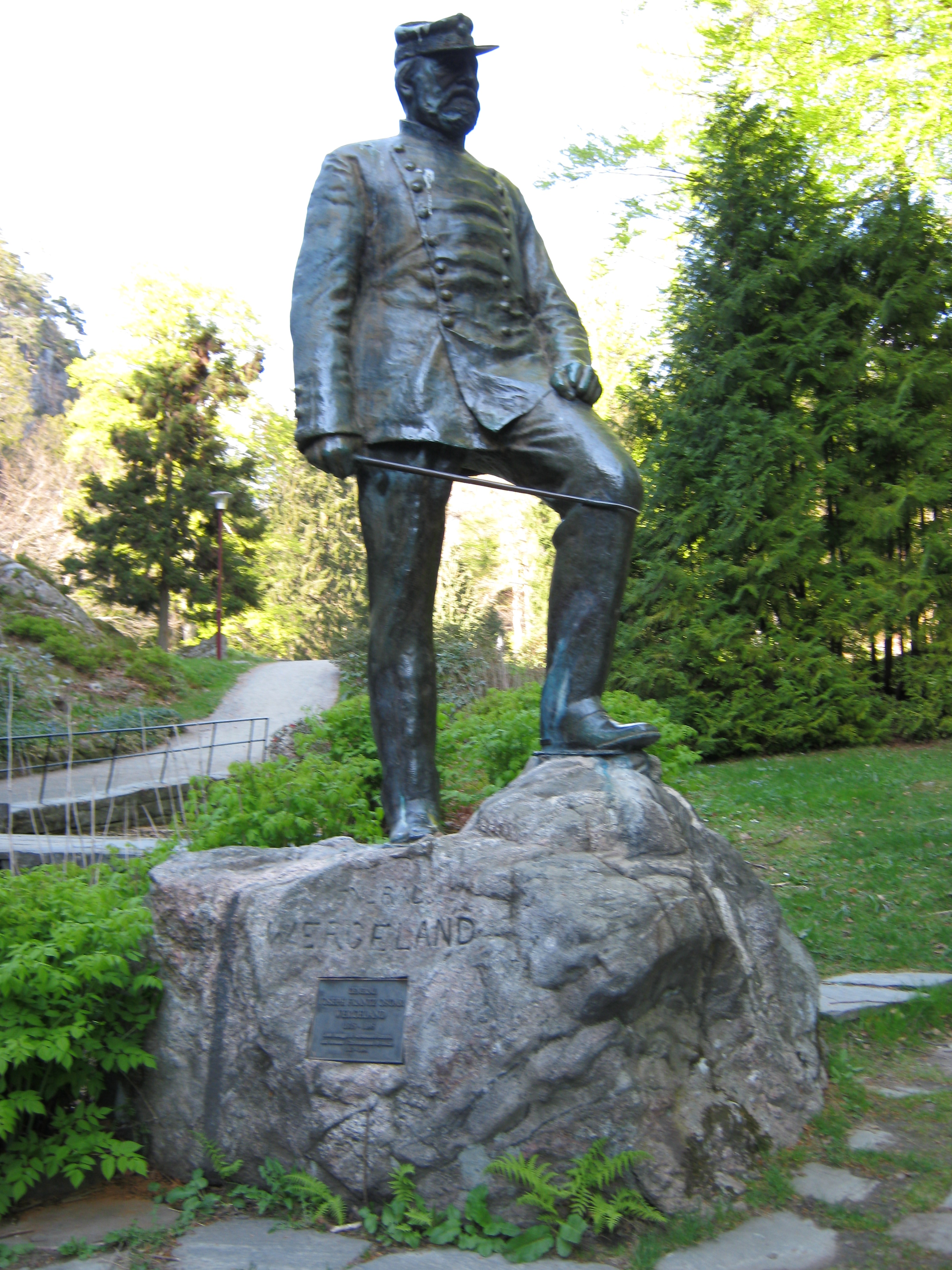
- Statue of Joseph Frantz Oscar Wergeland
- Born: 17 November 1815; Christianssand
- Died: 19 August 1895 (aged 79); Christianssand
- Relatives: Nicolai Wergeland (father); Henrik Wergeland (brother); Camilla Collett (sister); Harald Nicolai Storm Wergeland (cousin, Lieutenant General)
- Military career
- Allegiance: Norway (Swedish-Norwegian Union)
- Branch: Norwegian Army
- Service years: 1834–1880
- Rank: Major General
- Other work: cartographer, teacher, skiing pioneer, landscaper

Joseph Frantz Oscar Wergeland (17 November 1815 – 19 August 1895) was a Norwegian military officer, cartographer and skiing pioneer.

== Personal life ==
Wergeland was born in Christianssand, grew up at Eidsvold. He was the son of the priest and politician Nicolai Wergeland, and a brother of the poet Henrik Wergeland and feminist writer Camilla Collett. His cousin was military officer Harald Nicolai Storm Wergeland. In 1859, he returned to Christianssand, where he stayed the rest of his life.

== Career ==
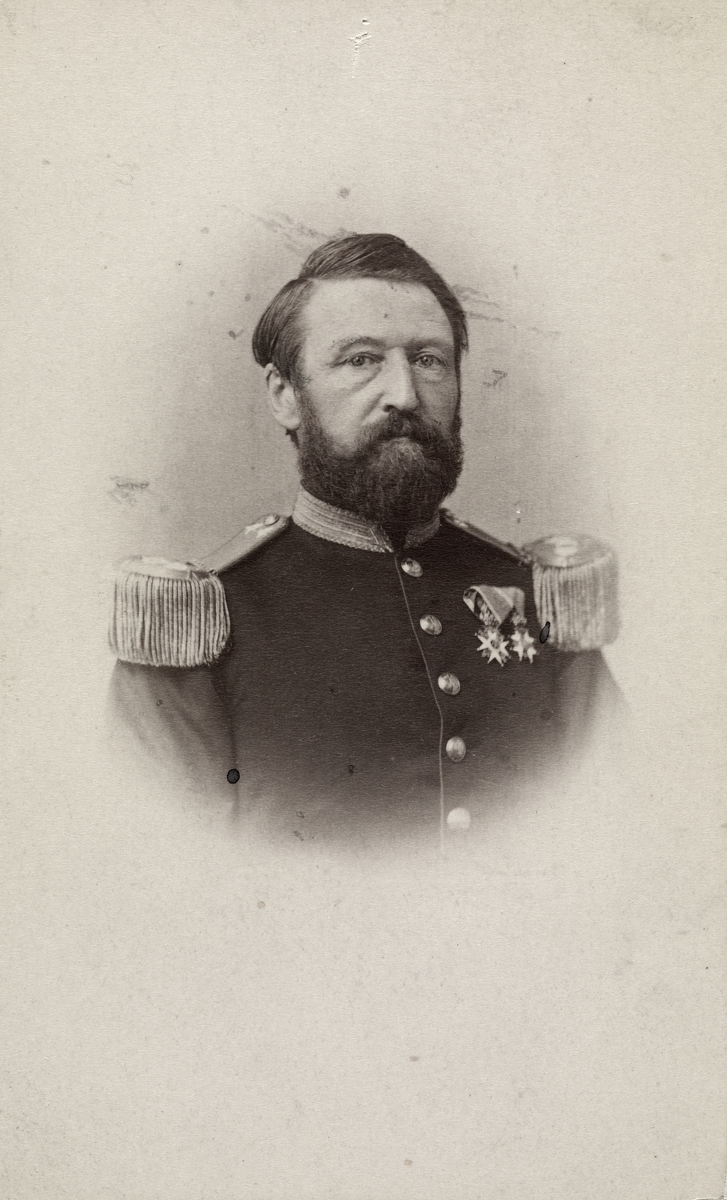
Joseph Frantz Oscar Wergeland photographed in the 1860s

Wergeland became a military officer in 1834, a first lieutenant in 1839, lieutenant colonel in 1866, colonel in 1868, and major general in 1880.

Wergeland had many talents. He worked 11 years as a cartographer for the Norwegian Mapping and Cadastre Authority, where he drew the first official Norwegian county maps (the first issued was Christians Amt in 1845). He drew the first large and detailed map of Norway for use in schools. He was a teacher in drawing and calligraphy at the Norwegian Military Academy. He was orderly officer for the King. He was a member of the committee for the Hoved Line, Norway's first railway line, and several road constructions. As an eager sportsman and skier, he initiated military skiing divisions, and wrote a book about the history of skiing and its military applications. He is regarded as the founder of the sports clubs Christianssand ski- og skøyteklubb (1862) and Oddersjaa (1875).

A significant number of letters from the Wergeland family is preserved, largely due to Oscar, who kept the letters he received from other family members. He had a good relationship with his sister Camilla, and her articles from travels to European cities inspired his landscape work in Christianssand, as he constructed the Wergeland park and the Ravnedalen park, planted Baneheia (former grazing land) with trees by use of soldiers, and transformed several main roads into large avenues. The Wergeland Park was constructed in 1859–60. It is surrounded by many old and important buildings, such as the Cathedral (1696/1737/1885), Latinskolen (1736/1855) and the City Hall (1864).

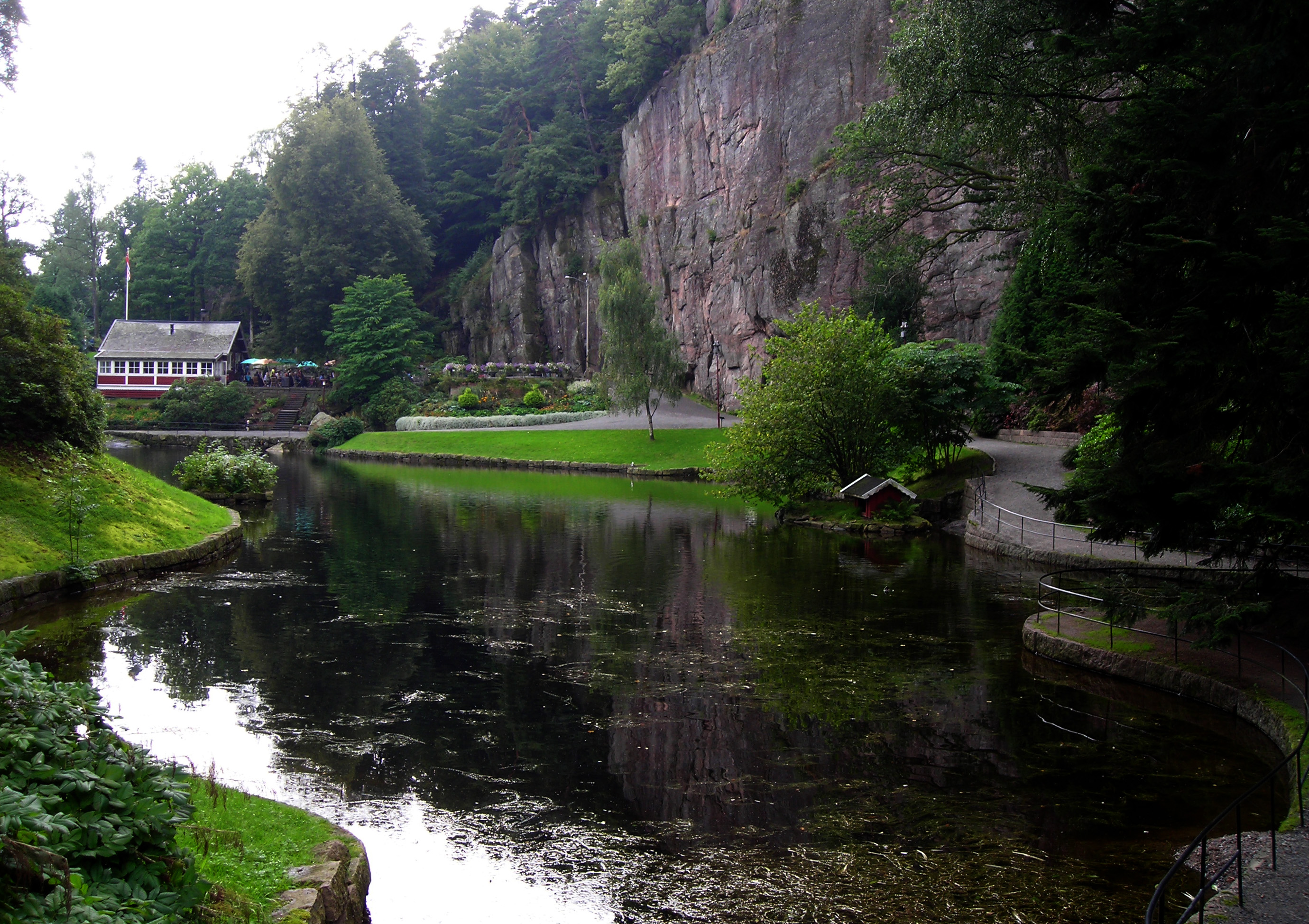
Cliffs, Ravnedalen Park

The Ravnedalen Park was constructed in the 1870s as a romantic garden, in a valley with dramatic cliffs, waterfalls and lake. It has open areas for public arrangements like concerts, gatherings and festivals.

== Statue ==
Gustav Lærum's bronze statue of Wergeland in Ravnedalen Park (above) was unveiled in 1917.

== Books ==
- Skiløber-Exercitie efter Nutidens Stridsmaade (1863)
- Skiløbingen, dens historie og krigsanvendelse (1865)

== Honours and awards ==
- Sweden-Norway:
  - Commander of the Royal Order of the Sword, 1st Class, 7 September 1875; Commander Grand Cross, 19 July 1891
  - Commander of the Royal Norwegian Order of Saint Olav, 1st Class, 21 January 1879
- Denmark: Grand Cross of the Order of the Dannebrog
- Kingdom of Italy: Grand Officer of the Order of the Crown of Italy
