= Kolsberg =

- Neighborhood in Kristiansand
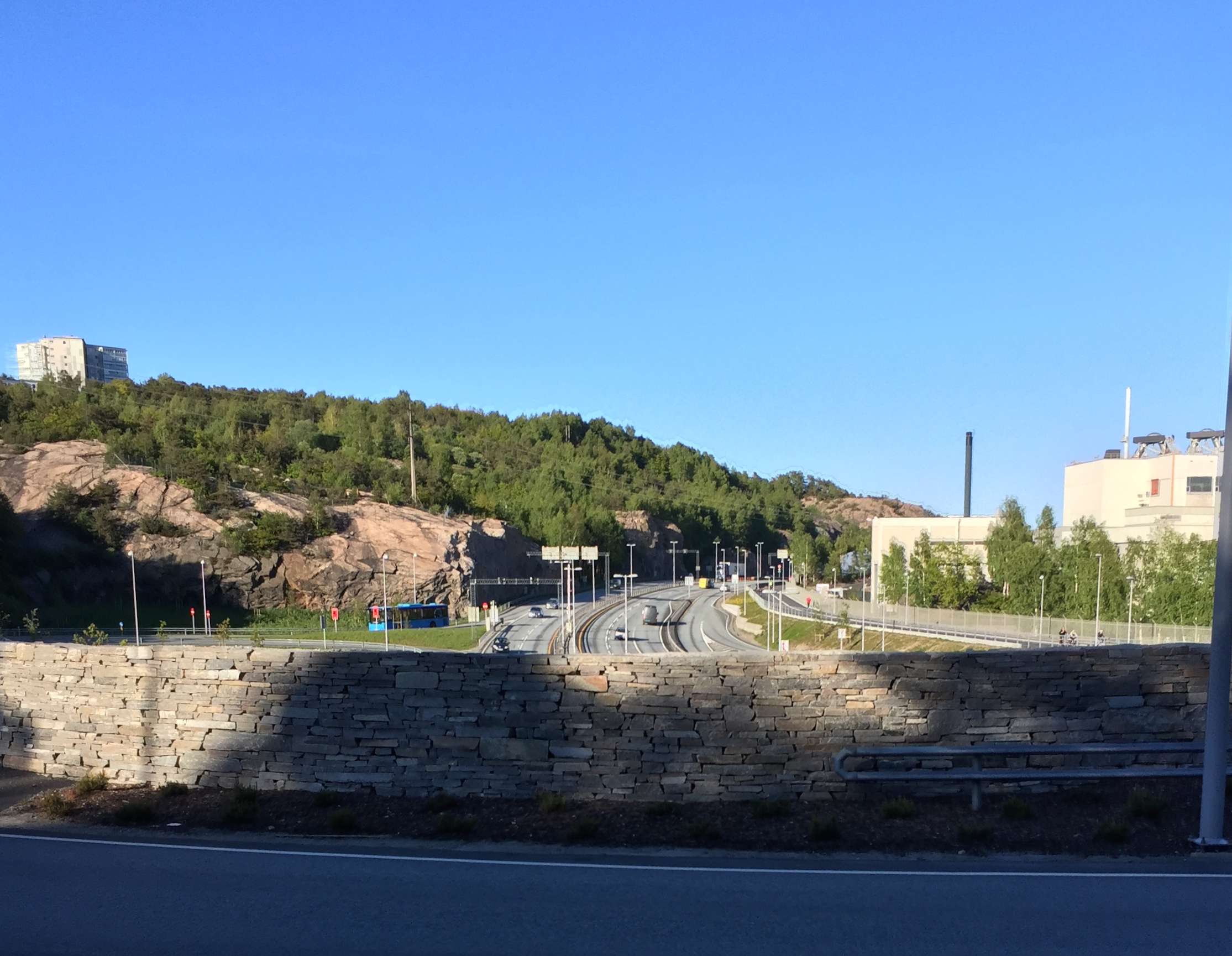
- View of the neighborhood
- Interactive map of Kolsberg
- Coordinates: 58.1458°N 07.9676°E
- Country: Norway
- County: Agder
- Municipality: Kristiansand
- Borough: Grim
- Elevation: 47 m (154 ft)
- Time zone: UTC+01:00 (CET)
  - Summer (DST): UTC+02:00 (CEST)
- Postal code: 4629
- Area code: 38

Kolsberg is a neighbourhood in the city of Kristiansand in Agder county, Norway. It is located in the borough of Grim. The apartments at Kolsberg in the hills can be seen from the European route E39 highway passing to the south.
