= Grim (Kristiansand) =

Borough in Kristiansand Municipality, Norway

- Borough of Kristiansand

- Coat of arms

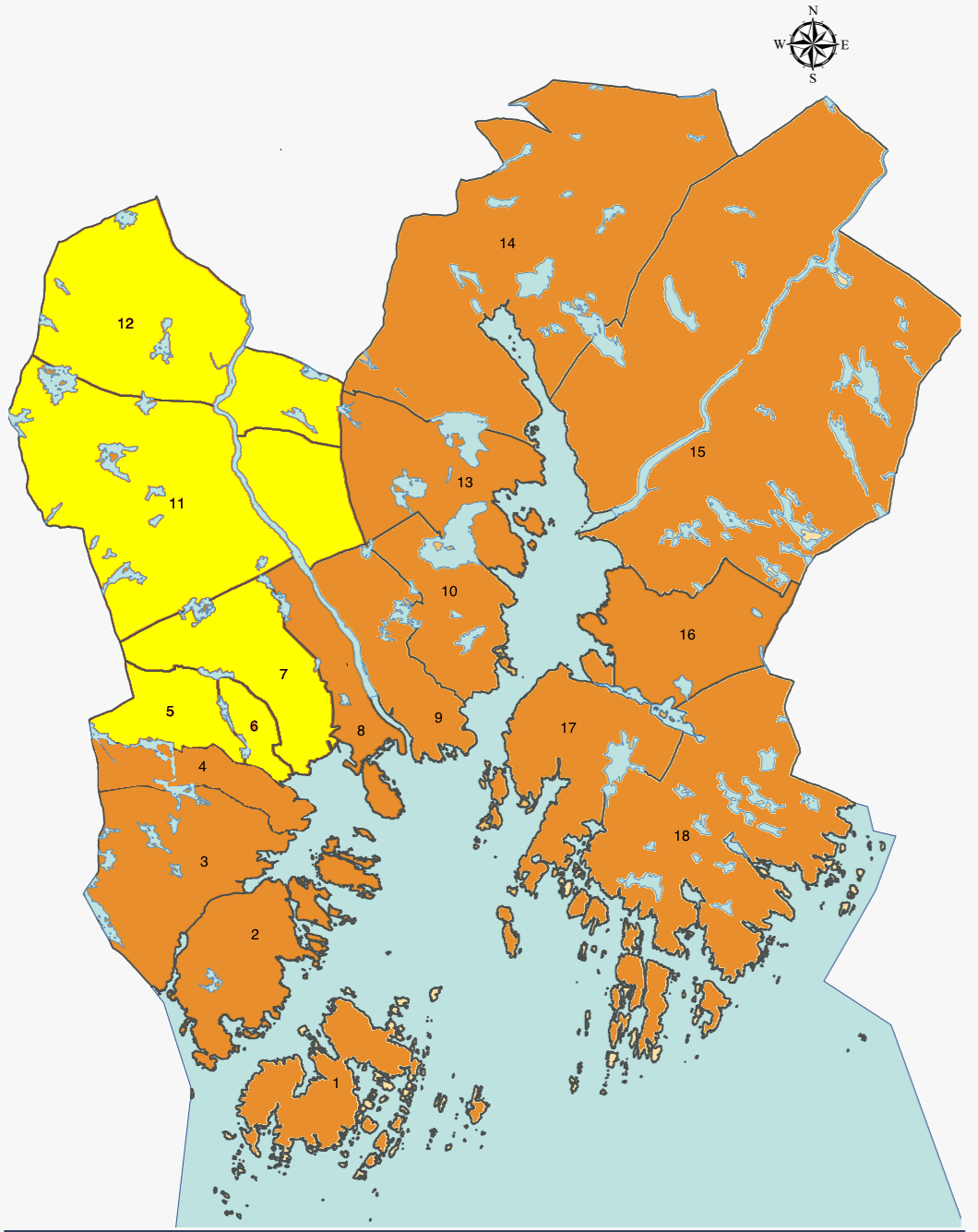
- Location of the borough of Grim, shown in yellow, in Kristiansand municipality
- Interactive map of Grim
- Coordinates: 58.1493°N 07.9719°E
- Country: Norway
- Region: Southern Norway
- County: Agder
- Municipality: Kristiansand Municipality
- Elevation: 20 m (66 ft)

Population (2015)
  - Total: 16,000
- Time zone: UTC+01:00 (CET)
  - Summer (DST): UTC+02:00 (CEST)
- Post Code prefix: 461*, 462*, 467*

Grim is a borough in the city of Kristiansand which lies in Kristiansand Municipality in Agder county, Norway. The borough has a population of about 16,000 people and is the second least populated borough in Kristiansand. Grim is located in the northwestern part of the municipality, north of Vågsbygd borough, northwest of Kvadraturen borough, and west of Lund borough. Grim also borders Vennesla Municipality to the north.

The borough of Grim is divided into five districts: Grim, Hellemyr, Tinnheia, Strai, and Mosby. The district of Grim is in the southeast part of the borough, forming a little centrum for the borough. The district of Hellemyr is located in the southwest part of the borough and the small district of Tinnheia is in the south central part of the borough. The northern two-thirds of the borough is made up of the two rural districts of Strai (central Grim) and Mosby (far northern Grim). Both of these districts are both characterized by an agrarian environment.

== History ==
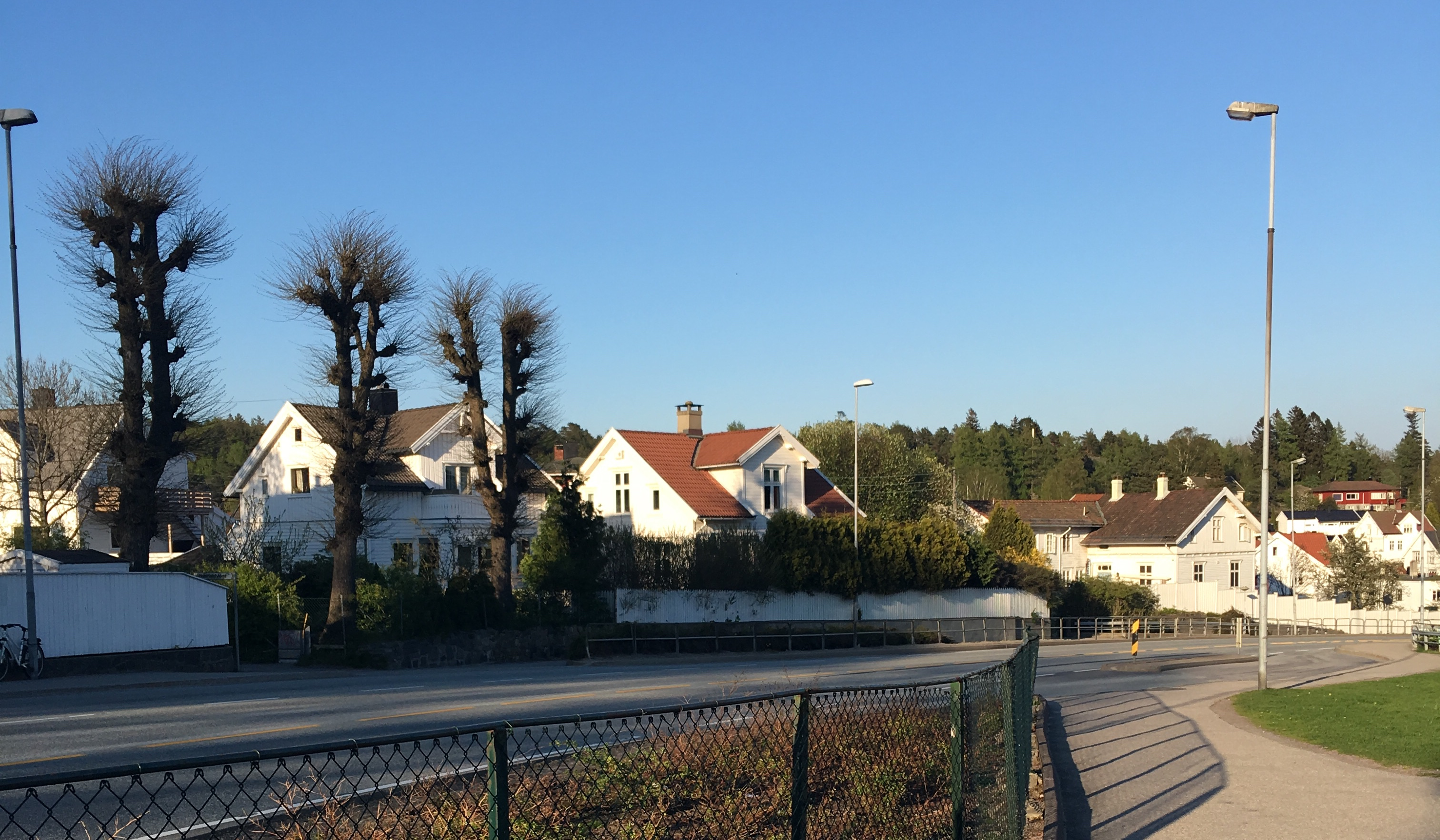
View of Setedalsveien

The city of Kristiansand was founded because of the nearby farms in Grim, which included some crown land, along with the nearby area of Eg. The area was called Grimsmoen and in 1643 and 1644 it was transferred from Grim to the city of Kristiansand, and today that area is the city center, called Kvadraturen, after the quadrant-based town plan that was prepared using Renaissance ideals. The term Sanden is also used when referring to Grimsmoen.

The districts of Strai and Mosby were both a part of Oddernes Municipality until it was merged into Kristiansand Municipality in 1965.

== Population and demographics ==
The district of Grim has a population of 5,200. Some of the larger neighborhoods in the district is Grimsmyra, Krossen, and Suldalen. The centrum of Grim is called Grim Torv and is located in the middle of the district. Grim consist of many large, white houses and apartments. Tinnheia is the district in Kristiansand with the most apartment buildings. There is a little centrum for Tinnheia at the top of the hill called Tinnheia Torv. Hellemyr consists of typical Norwegian neighborhoods. Strai and Mosby both consist of a lot of farms and rural neighborhoods.

The borough of Grim is the 3rd most populous place for immigrants in Kristiansand, making up 22% of the population and 19% of the population of the district of Grim. About 5% of the immigrants are from Europe and North America while 17% are from Africa and Asia.

List of districts in the borough of Grim
Nr	District	Population	Map
1	Grim (Centrum)	5,200	
2	Tinnheia	3,800	
3	Hellemyr	2,900	
4	Mosby	3,880	
5	Strai	2,000	

=== Neighbourhoods ===
- Artillerivollen
- Bellevue
- Breimyr
- Brønnstykket
- Dalane
- Dueknipden
- Eigevannskollen
- Enrum
- Fjellro
- Fidje
- Hellemyrtoppen
- Hellemyrlia
- Hellinga
- Idda
- Hannevik terasse
- Hannevika
- Hannevikdalen
- Hannevikåsen
- Haus
- Heisel
- Hommeren
- Høie
- Høietun
- Indre Strai
- Koboltveien
- Kolsberg
- Kolsdalen
- Lindekleiv
- Fagerdal
- Grim torv
- Grimsmyra
- Grimsvollen
- Møllevannet
- Klappane
- Krossen
- Mosby
- Ravnedalen
- Paradis
- Sløyfen
- Solholmen
- Solkollen
- Suldalen
- Tinnheia nordvest
- Tinnheia sørøst
- Tinnheia torv
- Tinnheiatoppen
- Tjuvhelleren
- Vestheiene
- Vestre Fidjane
- Ytre Strai
- Øvre Mosby

=== Centrums ===
Grim torv is the small centrum for the district Grim, it is located in the middle of Grim with Grim Junior High. The centrum has a bakery, pharmacy, hair salon, pizza place, grocery stores, and other business. There is an old closed factory behind Grim torv. Tinnheia torv is located at the top of Tinnheia and has a little square with a playground in the middle. The square is surrounded by small stores and grocery stores. There is also a pizza place at Tinnheia torv along with an activity club, solarium and karate center. Vestheiene is the centrum for Hellemyr. It has a small square street called Skomagergada, there is a hair saloon and a pizza place at the location along with a grocery store and Hellemyr Church. Mosby has a small centrum for both Strai and Mosby. There is a small park and some stores there.

== Economy ==
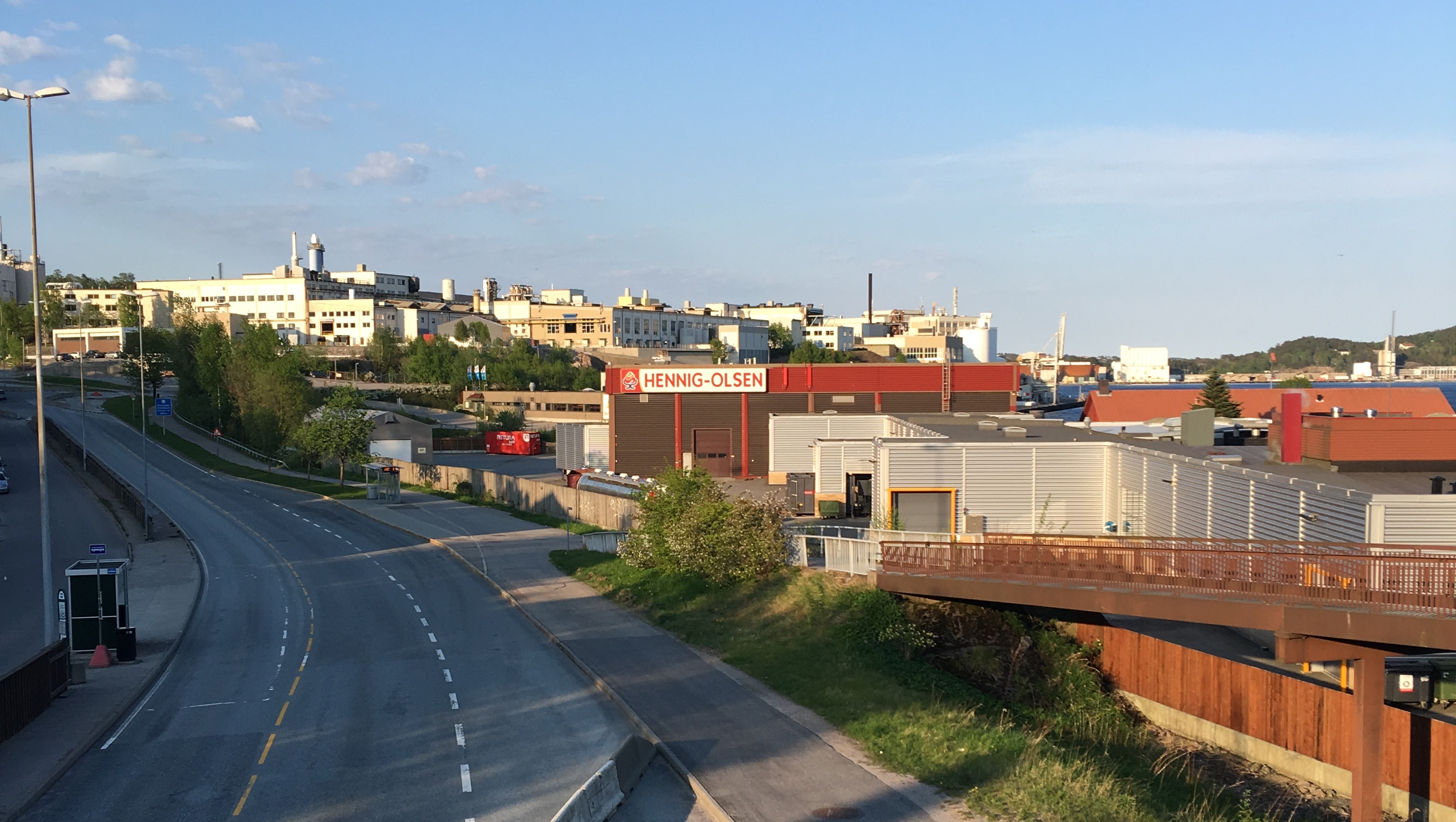
Hannevika

Hannevika is a large industrial area in Kristiansand and is a part of Tinnheia. The industrial areas largest businesses is Hennig-Olsen Is, a large Norwegian ice-cream company which has its headquarters here. Glencore has a fabric located in Hannevika.

Christianssands Bryggeri is a local brewery located in Grim district and was founded 1859. Tine is the largest dairy company which has it fabric for Southern Norway located at Hellemyr. Idda Arena is an arena located in Grim district with a little skateboard park outside. The arena is the only ice hall in Southern Norway.

== Nature ==
Ravnedalen

Ravnedalen is a park in Grim district with Grimsmyra. The park was created in 1874 as a suggestion from Joseph Frantz Oscar Wergeland, brother of Henrik Wergeland. Today the park has fountains, creeks, and a cafe named "The General". There is also statues there. Ravnedalen has some of the largest trees in Norway. The park also have a large outdoor scene. Baneheia is next to Ravnedalen and there is a trail you can follow to get there.

Eigevann is a lake between Hellemyr and Tinnheia. The lake has a little beach and trails to Koboltveien at Tinnheia where it meets another trail to Solkollen at Hellemyr.

Dueknipden is a lookout point at Tinnheia. The view is of downtown Kristiansand, Kvadraturen, and the ocean. There is also a lake there and trails. The river Otra runs through the Torridal valley where Strai and Mosby are located.

== Education ==
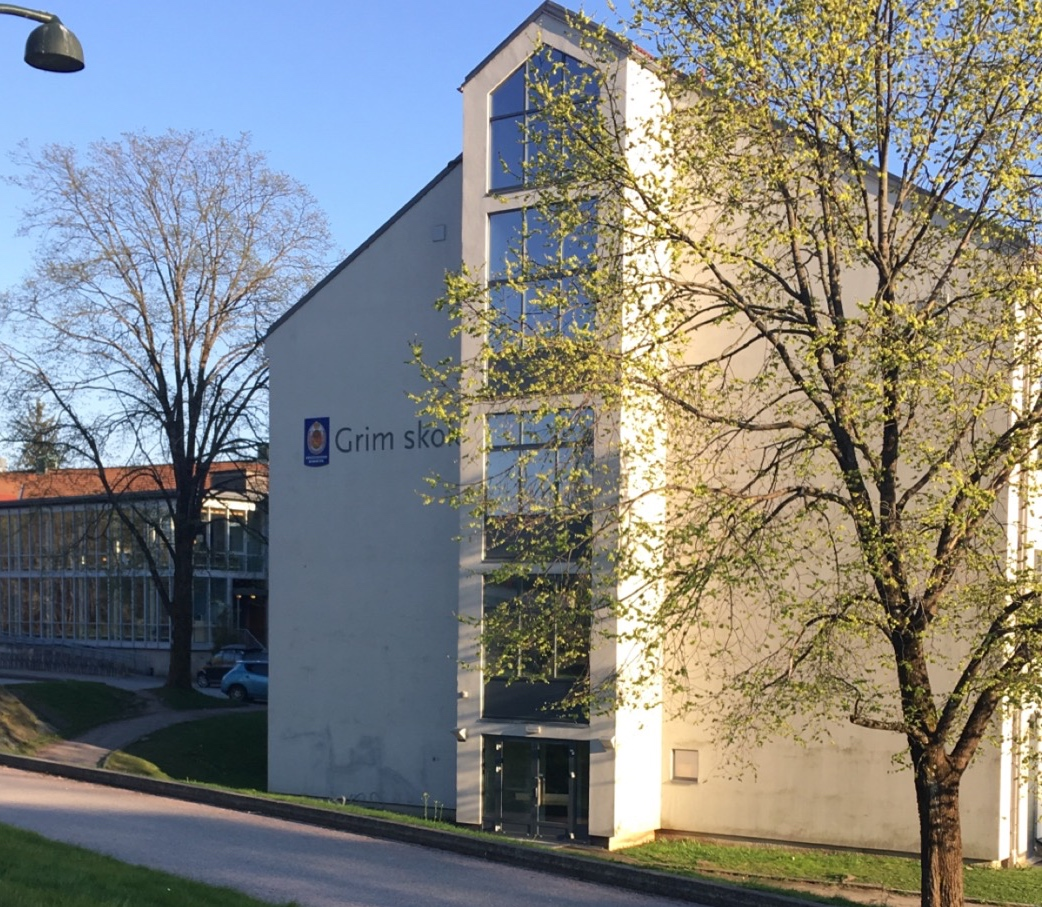
Grim Junior High

Grim has two elementary schools, Solhomen and Krossen elementary. Grim is located with one junior high, Grim School which is for students in the entire Grim district. The closest high schools are at Kvadraturen.

List of schools in Grim
Name	Location	Type
Grim skole	Grim torv	Junior High
Hellemyr skole	Hellemyr	Elementary school
Krossen skole	Krossen	Elementary school
Karl Johan Memorial skole	Tinnheia	Elementary school
Mosby skole	Mosby	Elementary school
Solholmen skole	Grim torv	Elementary school
Torridal skole	Strai	Elementary and Junior High

== Religion ==
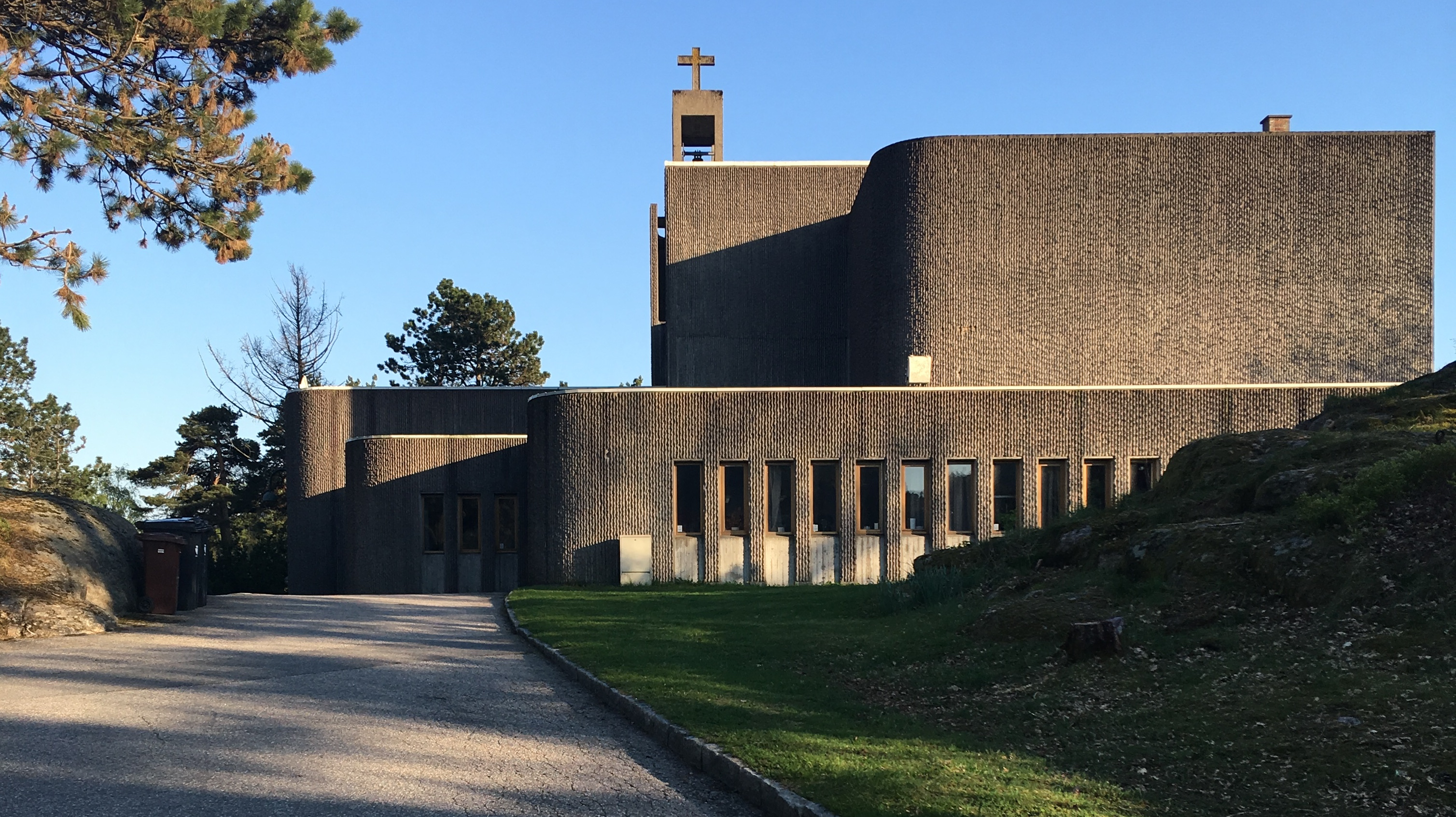
Grim Church

There are three Protestant churches in the borough and one Orthodox church. The Protestant churches are located at Vestheiene at Hellemyr, one with Grim torv and one in Strai called Torridal Church. The orthodox church is located at Tinnheia. Grim Church was finished in 1969 and is made out of concrete, the church has seating capacity of 750 people and is the largest church in the borough. Grim is the Protestant church for the district Grim and the district Tinnheia. Hellemyr Church was built in 1988 also of concrete and has a seating capacity of 220 people. The church is located at Vestheiene which is a small centrum for the district Hellemyr. Torridal Church is the church for the districts Strai and Mosby and is located in Strai. The church was finished in 1978 and is built out of expanded clay aggregate.

Grim and Tinnheia is its own parish in the Diocese of Agder og Telemark. In 1997, Hellemyr became its own parish.

== Transportation ==
=== Road ===
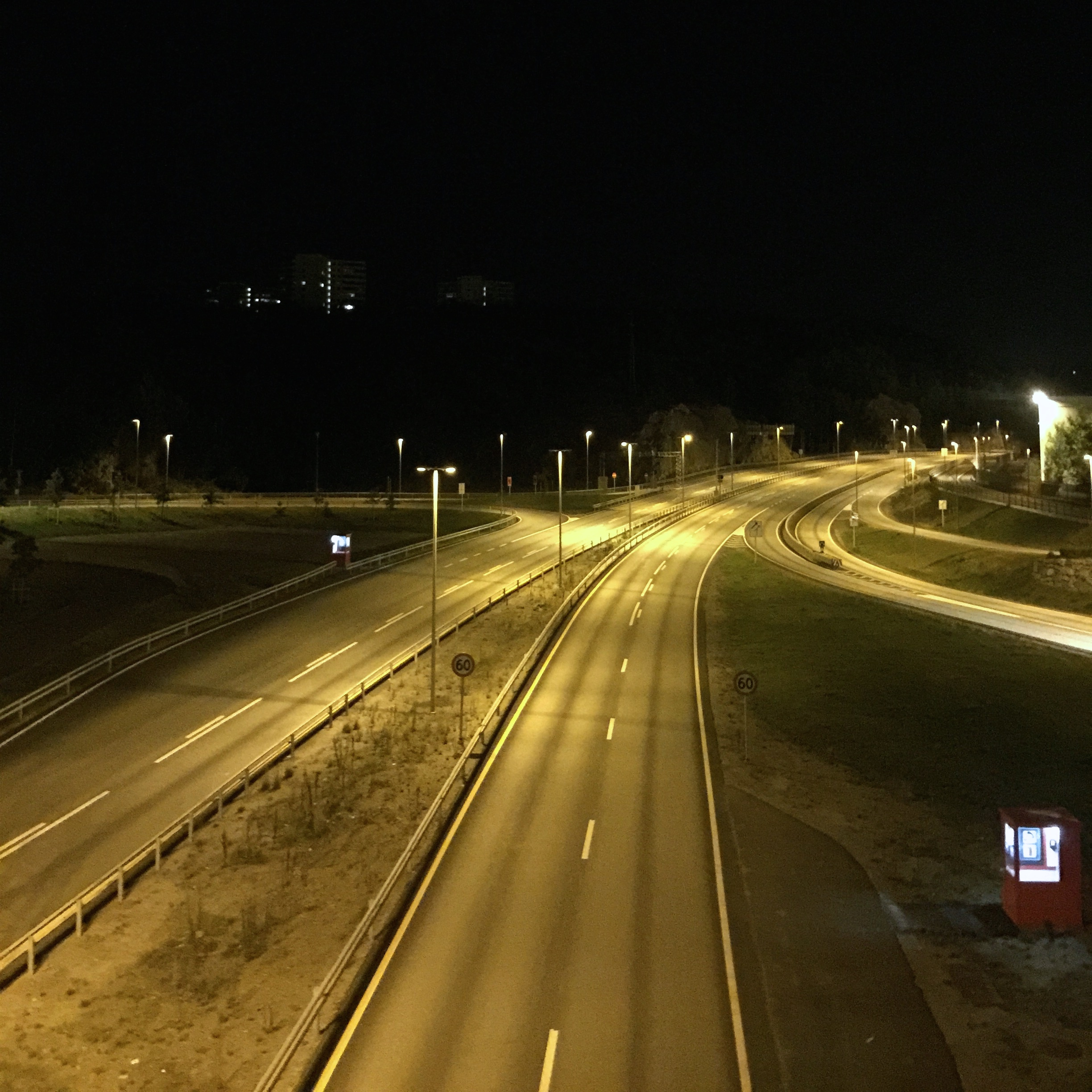
E39 with Hannevika

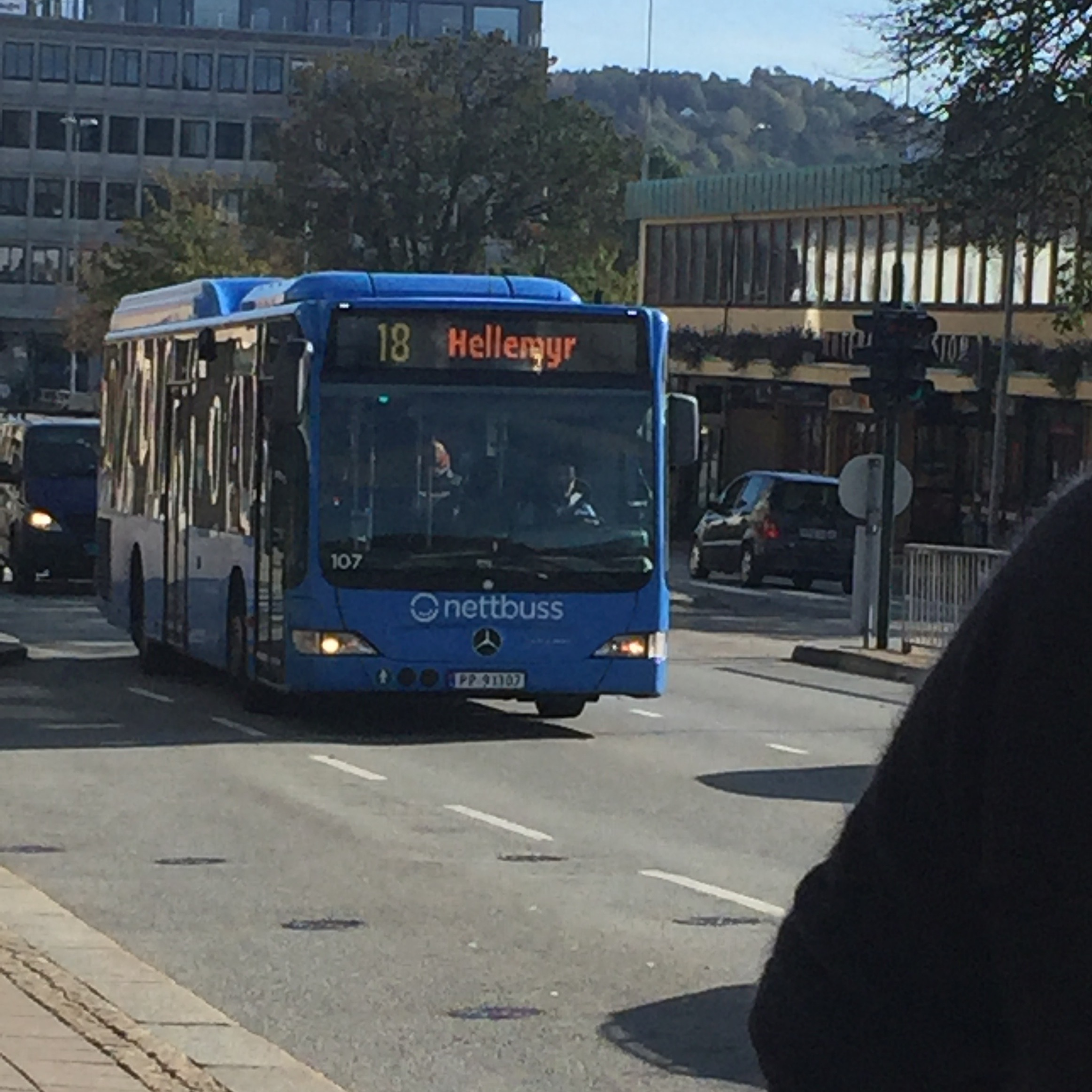
Bus bound for Hellemyr

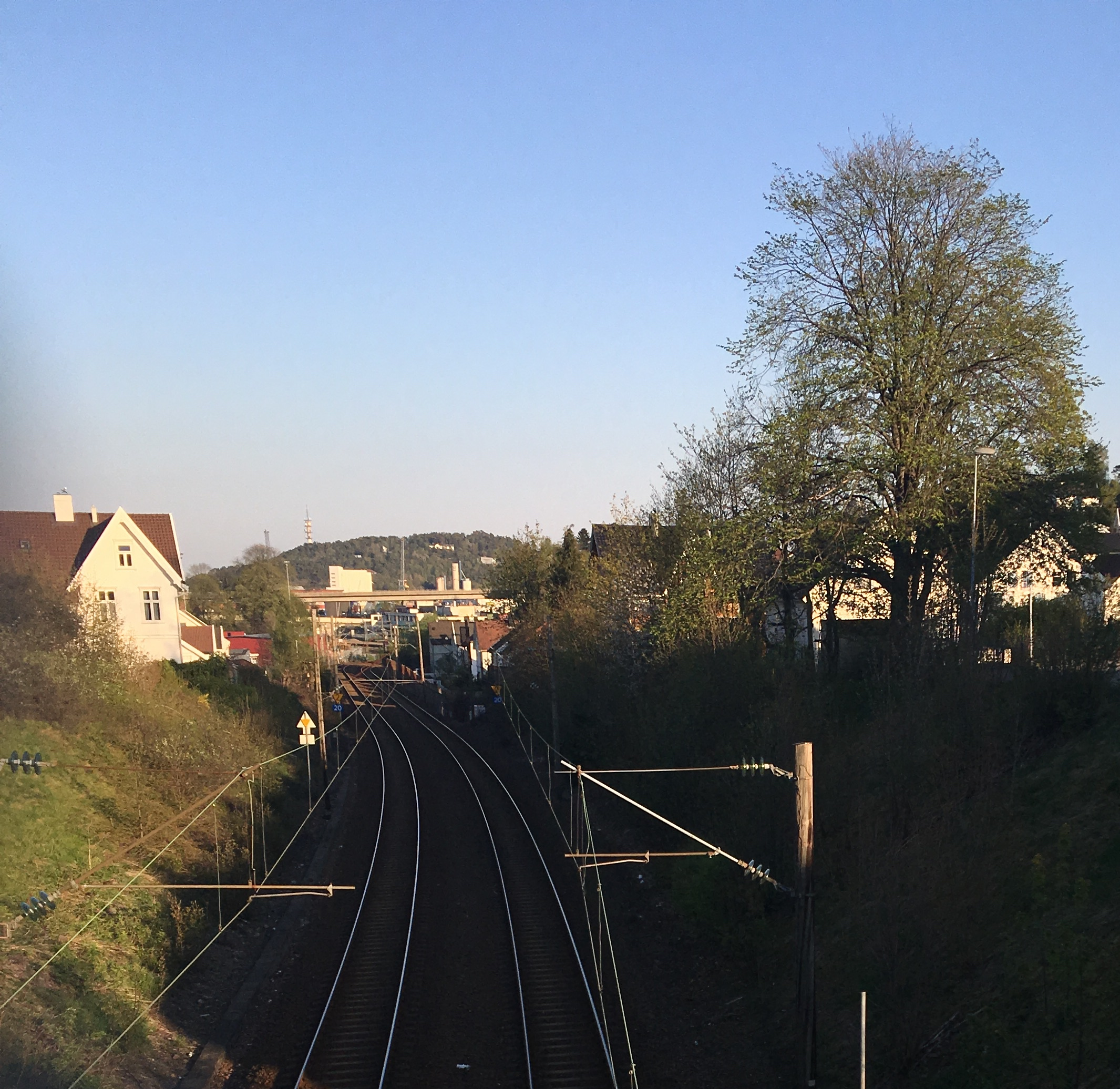
Railroads in Grim

The two main roads in the area is European route E39 and Norwegian National Road 9. E39 starts with Bellevue and goes in tunnel under Hannevika which is called Hanneviktunnelen. The most traffical stretch in Kristiansand starts with Hanneviktunnelen. There is an exit of the highway to Hannevika and Tinnheia. The road splits and E39 goes towards Hellemyr and has an exit for Slettheia and again Tinnheia, then twice Hellemyr. E39 leads out to Songdalen. Norwegian National Road 9, shortened Rv9, starts with Garnterløkka roundabout and goes past the Christianssands Brewery and Grimsmyra. Rv9 passes Grim torv and goes through the neighborhoods Klappane, Krossen, Dalane, Bymoen before it goes through Strai and Mosby. The road is the main road for these three districts and leads past Høietun before it leads into Vennesla municipality.

List of notable roads in Grim
Route	Destination
E39	Downtown - Hannevika - Fidje - Stavanger
Rv9	Downtown - Krossen - Strai - Høietun - Evje
Fv1	Lund - Strai - Vennesla
Fv30	Bellevue - Krossen
Fv303	Strai - Nodeland
Fv405	Mosby - Vennesla

=== Bus ===
The main public transport is bus; bus lines 15 Tinnheia-Kvadraturen, 32 Høietun-Kvadraturen and 30 Vennesla-Kristiansand go through Grim, while 13 Grimsyra-Lund and 19 Suldalen-UiA cover most of Grim and end there. The railroad into Kristiansand is built through Grim; it is the only way in for trains, but the closest stop is Kristiansand Station, the main train station for the city.

Bus transportation from/through Grim
Line	Destination
13	Grimsmyra - Lund
15	Tinnheia - Kvadraturen
15	Tinnheia - Kvadraturen-UiA
17	Hellemyr - Tømmerstø
17	Hellemyr - Tømmerstø-Frikstad
17	Hellemyr - Kvadraturen
17	Hellemyr - Kvadraturen-UiA
18	Hellemyr - Tømmerstø Odderhei-Holte
19	Suldalen - Lund-UiA
30	Vennesla - Kvadraturen
32	Høietun - Kvadraturen
32	Høietun - Kvadraturen-UiA
511	Evje - Kristiansand
N16	Hellemyr - Tinnheia - Kvadraturen
N30	Vennesla - Kvadraturen

=== Train ===
The railroad goes through Grim from Songdalen next to Hellemyr and Norwegian National Road 9 before entering Kristiansand Station. The railroad eastbound continues through entire Grim to Vennesla Station. There are no stops between.

The Setesdal Line, which operated from 1891 to 1988, started at Grimsbroen where Norwegian National 9 goes today. The line had stops at Mosby and Aukland in Strai in the borough. Both stations closed down in 1991 and was a part of the Setesdal Line and Sørlandet Line.
