= Holte (Kristiansand) =

- Neighborhood in Kristiansand
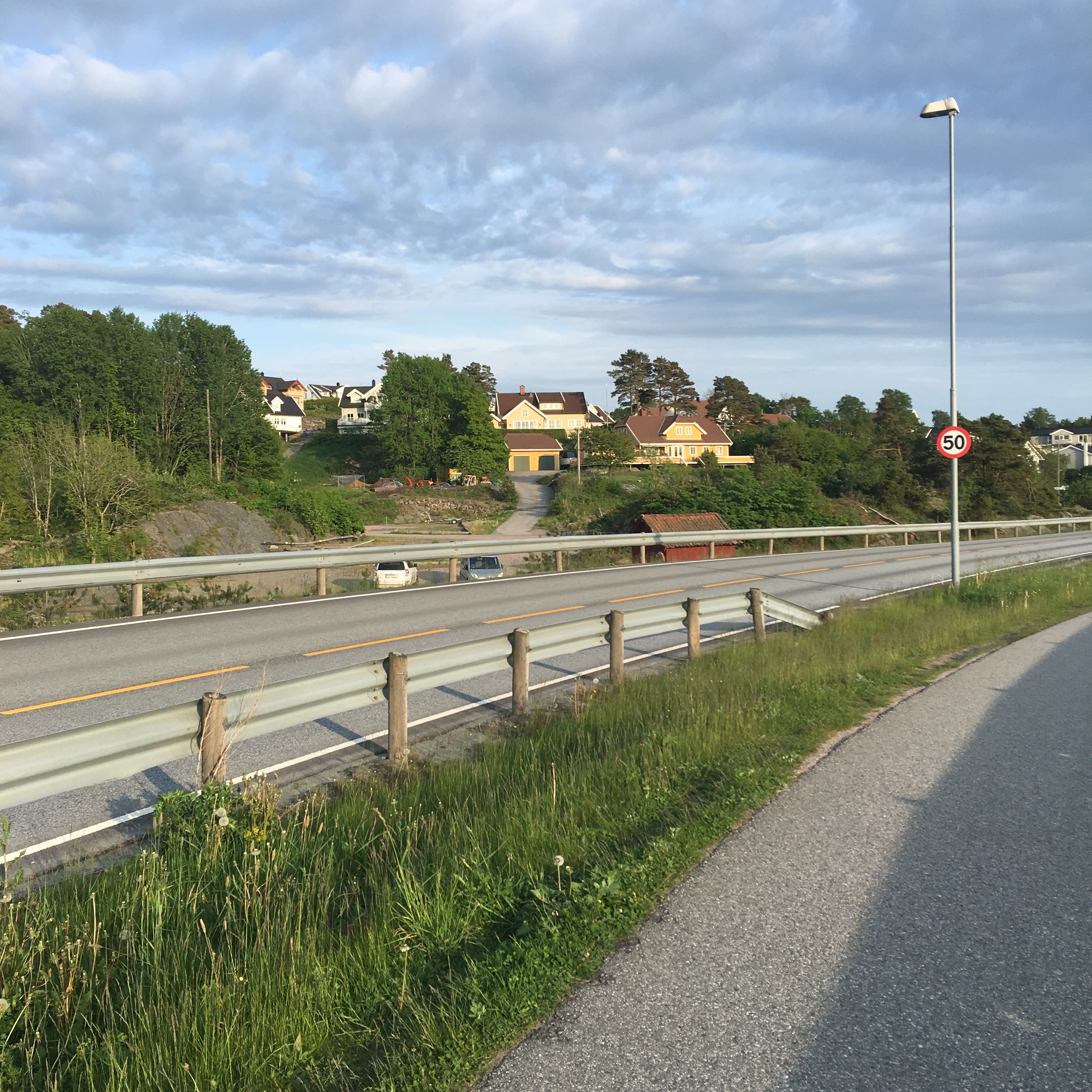
- View of Holte with Fidjeåsen
- Interactive map of Holte
- Coordinates: 58.1311°N 08.1003°E
- Country: Norway
- County: Agder
- Municipality: Kristiansand
- Borough: Oddernes
- District: Randesund
- Elevation: 16 m (52 ft)
- Time zone: UTC+01:00 (CET)
  - Summer (DST): UTC+02:00 (CEST)
- Postal code: 4639
- Area code: 38

Holte is a neighbourhood in the city of Kristiansand in Agder county, Norway. It's located in the borough of Oddernes and in the district of Randesund. The neighborhood of Tømmerstø lies to the south and Frikstad lies to the east. Holte Junior High is the only junior high in Randesund.

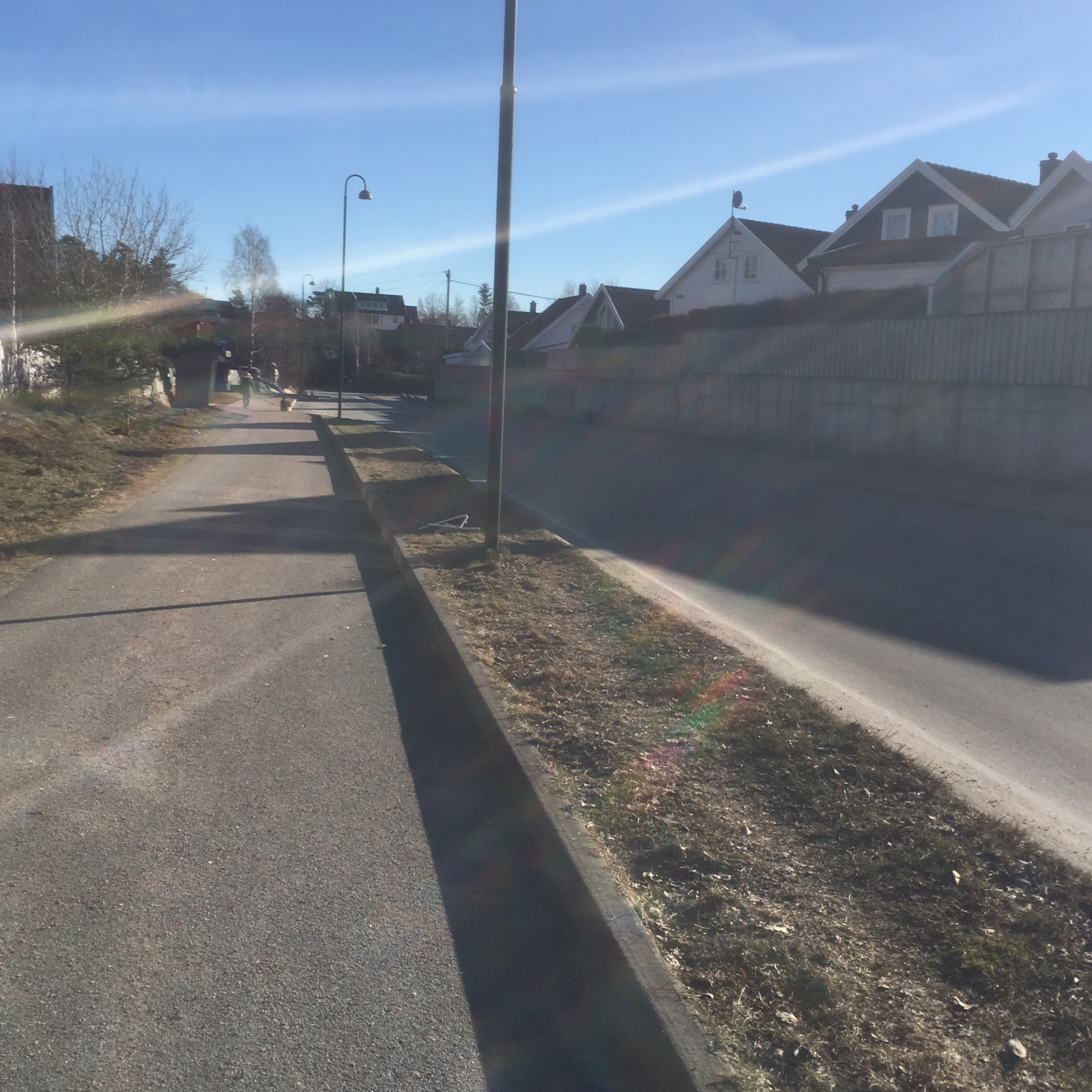
Holteveien, with Bordalen on the right side of the road.

Bus lines from Holte
Line	Destination
08	Holte - Frikstad - Rona
18	Hellemyr - Tømmerstø Odderhei-Holte
