= Odderhei =

- Neighborhood in Kristiansand
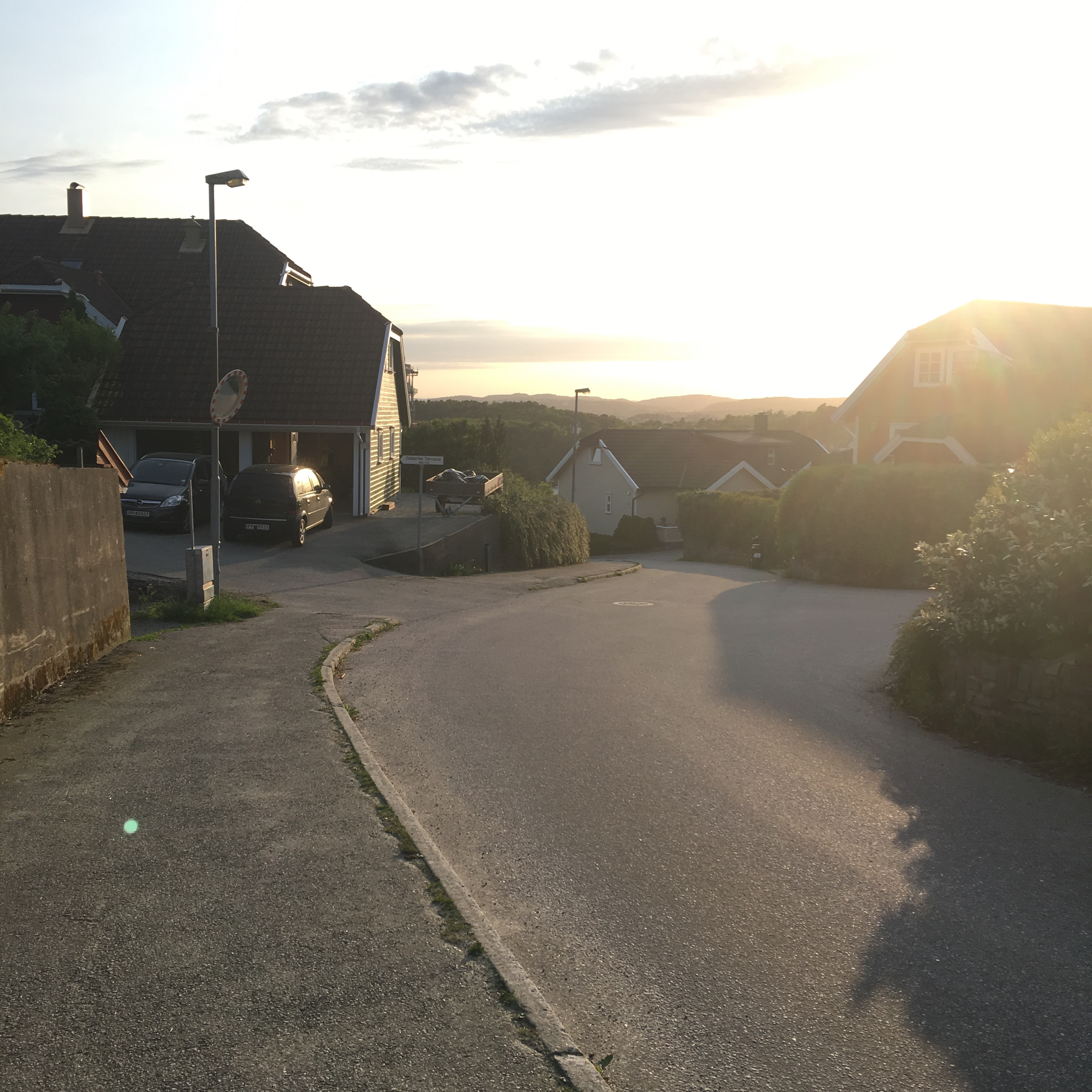
- View of the neighborhood
- Interactive map of Odderhei
- Coordinates: 58.1375°N 08.0782°E
- Country: Norway
- County: Agder
- Municipality: Kristiansand
- Borough: Oddernes
- District: Randesund
- Elevation: 36 m (118 ft)
- Time zone: UTC+01:00 (CET)
  - Summer (DST): UTC+02:00 (CEST)
- Postal code: 4639
- Area code: 38

Odderhei is a neighborhood in the city of Kristiansand in Agder county, Norway. It is in the borough of Oddernes and in the district of Randesund. It is located northwest of Tømmerstø and Holte. The nearby district of Søm lies to the north.

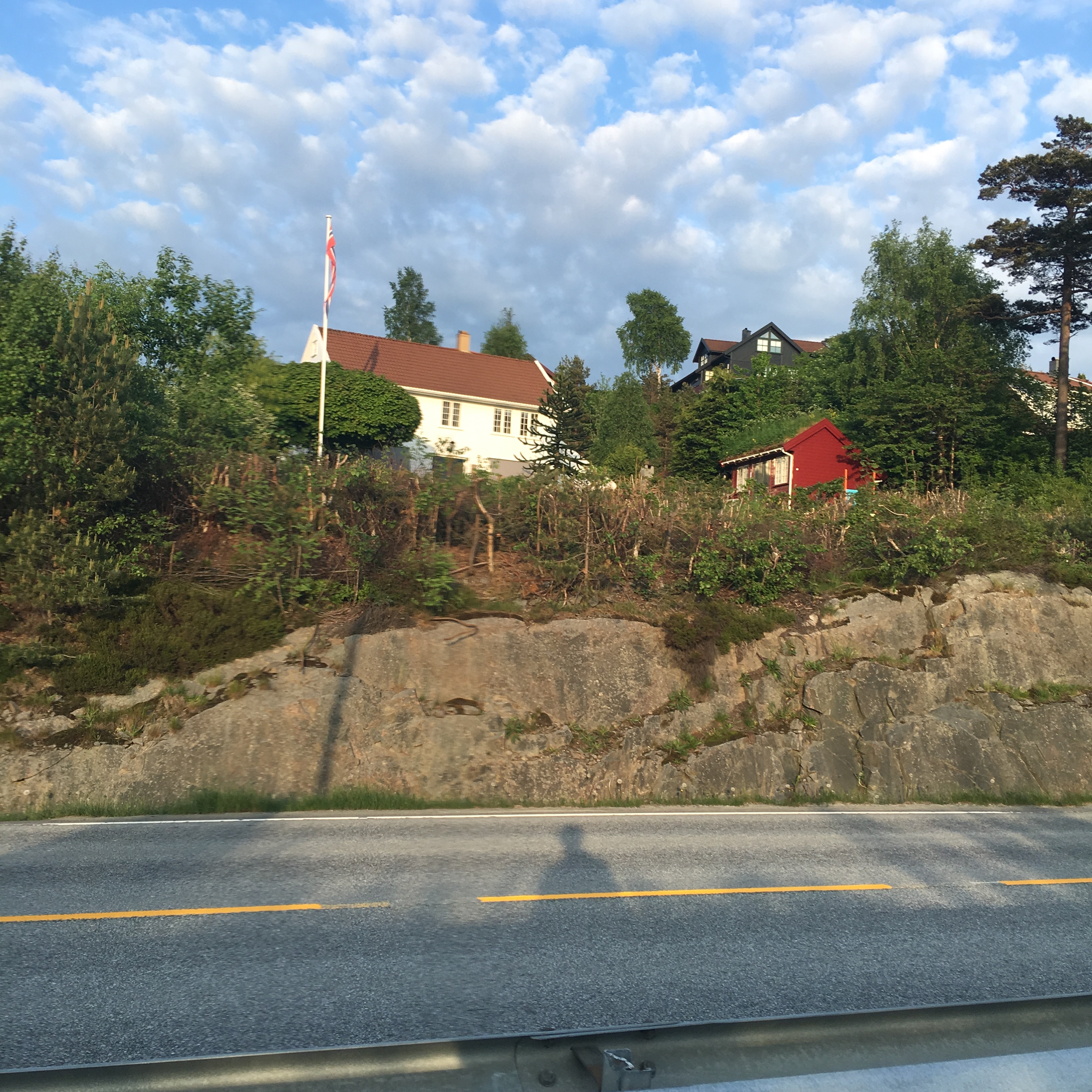
Odderhei with Kystveien

Bus lines from Odderhei
Line	Destination
18	Hellemyr - Tømmerstø - Odderhei - Holte
