= Frikstad =

- Neighborhood in Kristiansand
- Interactive map of Frikstad
- Coordinates: 58.1319°N 08.1182°E
- Country: Norway
- County: Agder
- Municipality: Kristiansand
- Borough: Oddernes
- District: Randesund
- Elevation: 26 m (85 ft)
- Time zone: UTC+01:00 (CET)
  - Summer (DST): UTC+02:00 (CEST)
- Postal code: 4639
- Area code: 38

Frikstad is a neighbourhood in the city of Kristiansand in Agder county, Norway. It's located in the borough of Oddernes and in the district of Randesund. Randesund Church is located at Frikstad. The neighborhoods of Holte and Tømmerstø lie to the southwest and the neighborhood of Kongshavn lies to the southeast.

The location was originally known as Øvre Frikstad, the shortened name has been an officially recognised alternative since 1978.

Bus lines serving Frikstad
Line	Destination
08	Rona - Kongshavn
17	Hellemyr - Tømmerstø - Frikstad
