= Kristiansand District Court =

Former district court in Norway

- Kristiansand tingrett
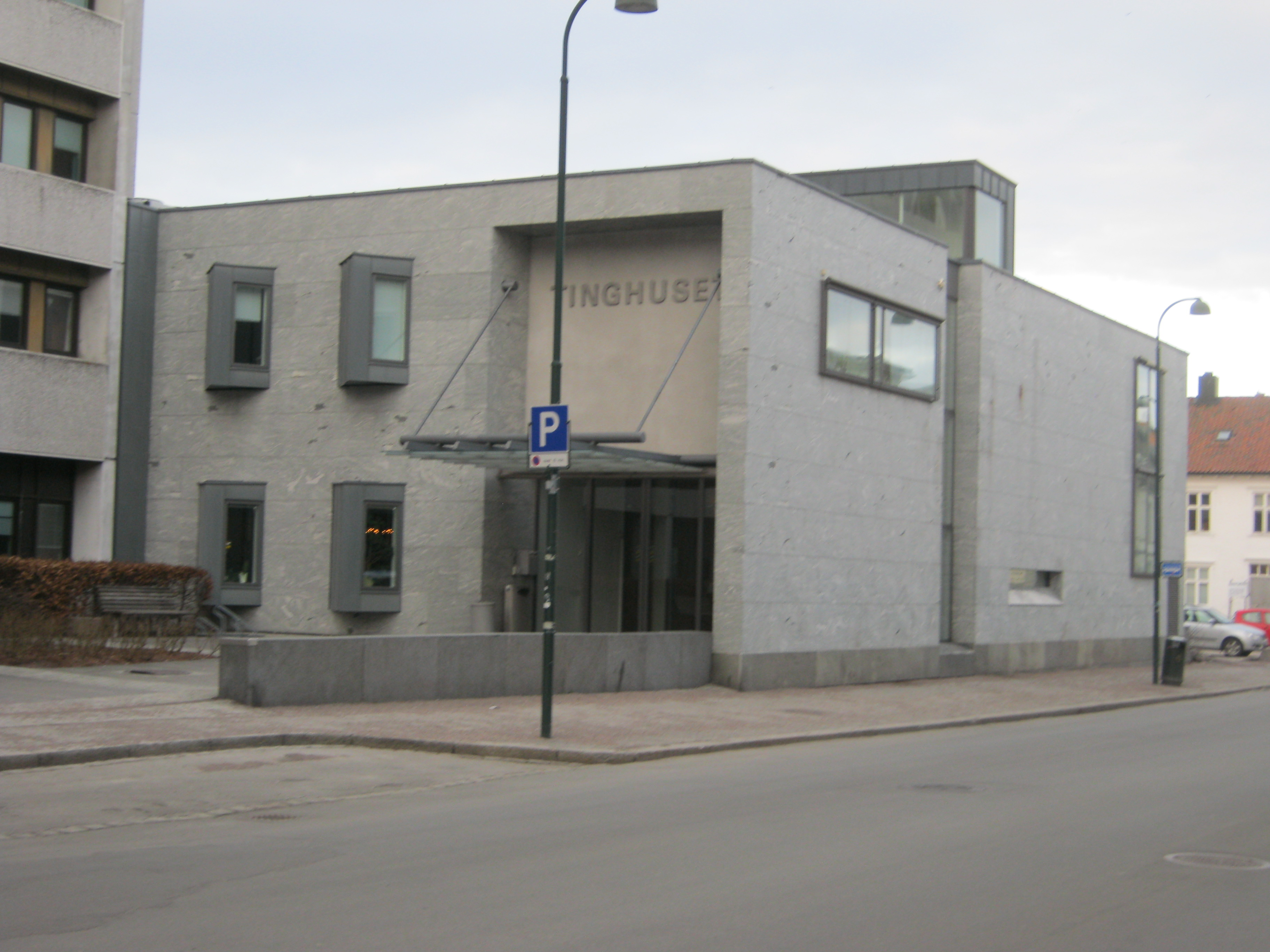
- The Courthouse of Kristiansand
- 58.14711°N 7.998474°E
- Established: 1643
- Dissolved: 26 April 2021
- Jurisdiction: Southern Agder
- Location: Tollbodgata 45; Kristiansand, Norway
- Coordinates: 58.14711°N 7.998474°E
- Appeals to: Agder Court of Appeal

Kristiansand District Court (Norwegian: Kristiansand tingrett) was a district court in Agder county, Norway. The court was based in the town of Kristiansand. The court existed until 2021. It had jurisdiction over the southern part of the county which included the municipalities of Kristiansand, Bykle, Valle, Bygland, Evje og Hornnes, Iveland, Vennesla, Birkenes, Lillesand, Lindesnes, and Åseral. Cases from this court could be appealed to Agder Court of Appeal. This court employed a chief judge, 11 other judges, 4 assistant judges, and 23 prosecutors.

The court was a court of first instance. Its judicial duties were mainly to settle criminal cases and to resolve civil litigation as well as bankruptcy. The administration and registration tasks of the court included death registration, issuing certain certificates, performing duties of a notary public, and officiating civil wedding ceremonies. Cases from this court were heard by a combination of professional judges and lay judges.

== History ==
This court was originally established in 1643 to serve the town of Christianssand. It functioned for a long time as a court for the town only. On 1 July 1957, the old Torridal District Court was closed and its area of jurisdiction (Oddernes, Randesund, Søgne, and Greipstad) were merged into this court. On 1 January 1965, the areas of Tveit (from Setesdal District Court) and Finsland (from Mandal District Court) were both added to the jurisdiction of this court as well. On 1 January 1992, the old Setesdal District Court was closed and the municipalities of Bykle, Valle, Bygland, Evje og Hornnes, Iveland, and Vennesla were added to this court's jurisdiction. On 1 January 2004, the Mandal District Court was closed and merged with this court (this included Åseral, Mandal, Marnardal, Audnedal, and Lindesnes). On the same date, the municipalities of Lillesand and Birkenes were added to this court from the Sand District Court. On 26 April 2021, Kristiansand District Court was merged with the Lister District Court and Aust-Agder District Court to create the new Agder District Court.
