= Mandal District Court =

Former district court in Norway

- Mandal tingrett
- 58.0269°N 7.45239°E
- Established: 1591
- Dissolved: 1 January 2004
- Jurisdiction: Central Vest-Agder
- Location: Mandal, Norway
- Coordinates: 58.0269°N 7.45239°E
- Appeals to: Agder Court of Appeal

Mandal District Court (Norwegian: Mandal tingrett) was a district court in Vest-Agder county, Norway. The court was based in the town of Mandal. The court existed from 1591 until 2004. It had jurisdiction over the central part of the county which included the municipalities of Mandal, Marnardal, Lindesnes, Audnedal, and Åseral. Cases from this court could be appealed to Agder Court of Appeal.

The court was a court of first instance. Its judicial duties were mainly to settle criminal cases and to resolve civil litigation as well as bankruptcy. The administration and registration tasks of the court included death registration, issuing certain certificates, performing duties of a notary public, and officiating civil wedding ceremonies. Cases from this court were heard by a combination of professional judges and lay judges.

== History ==
This court was first established in 1591 when the district court system was set up in Norway. In 1856, the Bjelland and Grindheim areas were transferred from the Lyngdal District Court to this court. In 1859, Nordre Undal Municipality and Søndre Undal Municipality were transferred from the Lyngdal District Court to this court. Also in 1859, the eastern part of this court's jurisdiction was separated to form the new Torridal District Court. In 1880, Åseral Municipality was transferred from the Setesdal District Court to this court. On 1 January 2004, this court was closed and it was merged into the Kristiansand District Court.
