= Lyngdal District Court =

Former district court in Norway

- Lyngdal tingrett
- 58.1376°N 7.07002°E
- Established: 1591
- Dissolved: 1 January 2004
- Jurisdiction: Southwestern Vest-Agder
- Location: Lyngdal, Norway
- Coordinates: 58.1376°N 7.07002°E
- Appeals to: Agder Court of Appeal

Lyngdal District Court (Norwegian: Lyngdal tingrett) was a district court in Vest-Agder county, Norway. The court was based in the town of Lyngdal. The court existed from 1809 until 2005. It had jurisdiction over the municipalities of Farsund, Hægebostad, and Lyngdal. Cases from this court could be appealed to Agder Court of Appeal.

The court was a court of first instance. Its judicial duties were mainly to settle criminal cases and to resolve civil litigation as well as bankruptcy. The administration and registration tasks of the court included death registration, issuing certain certificates, performing duties of a notary public, and officiating civil wedding ceremonies. Cases from this court were heard by a combination of professional judges and lay judges.

== History ==
This court was established on 25 September 1809 when the old Lister District Court was divided in two. The western part of the court's jurisdiction became the Flekkefjord District Court and the eastern part became the Lyngdal District Court. In 1856, the Bjelland and Grindheim areas were transferred from this court to the Mandal District Court. In 1859, Nordre Undal Municipality and Søndre Undal Municipality were transferred from this court to the Mandal District Court. On 1 January 2005, the Lyngdal District Court and Flekkefjord District Court were merged to create the new Lister District Court.
