= Nedenes District Court =

Former district court in Norway

- Nedenes tingrett
- Interactive map of Nedenes District Court
- 58.464455°N 8.761558°E
- Established: 23 March 1852
- Dissolved: 1 September 2004
- Jurisdiction: Eastern Aust-Agder
- Location: Arendal, Norway
- Coordinates: 58.464455°N 8.761558°E
- Appeals to: Agder Court of Appeal

Nedenes District Court (Norwegian: Nedenes tingrett) was a district court in Aust-Agder county, Norway. The court was based in the town of Arendal. The court existed from 1852 until 2004. It had jurisdiction over the municipalities of Arendal, Froland and Åmli. Cases from this court could be appealed to Agder Court of Appeal.

The court was a court of first instance. Its judicial duties were mainly to settle criminal cases and to resolve civil litigation as well as bankruptcy. The administration and registration tasks of the court included death registration, issuing certain certificates, performing duties of a notary public, and officiating civil wedding ceremonies. Cases from this court were heard by a combination of professional judges and lay judges.

== History ==
This court was established on 23 March 1852 when the old district courts for the region were reorganized. The following areas were placed under the jurisdiction of the new Nedenes District Court:

- Aamli Municipality from the old Østre Råbyggelaget District Court
- Øiestad Municipality from the Vestre Nedenes District Court
- Østre Moland Municipality from the Østre Nedenes District Court

In 1935, the town of Arendal was added to the jurisdiction of this court when the old Arendal District Court was closed.

On 1 September 2004, the Nedenes District Court was merged with the old Holt District Court and Sand District Court to create the new Aust-Agder District Court.
