= Aust-Agder District Court =

Former district court in Norway

- Aust-Agder tingrett
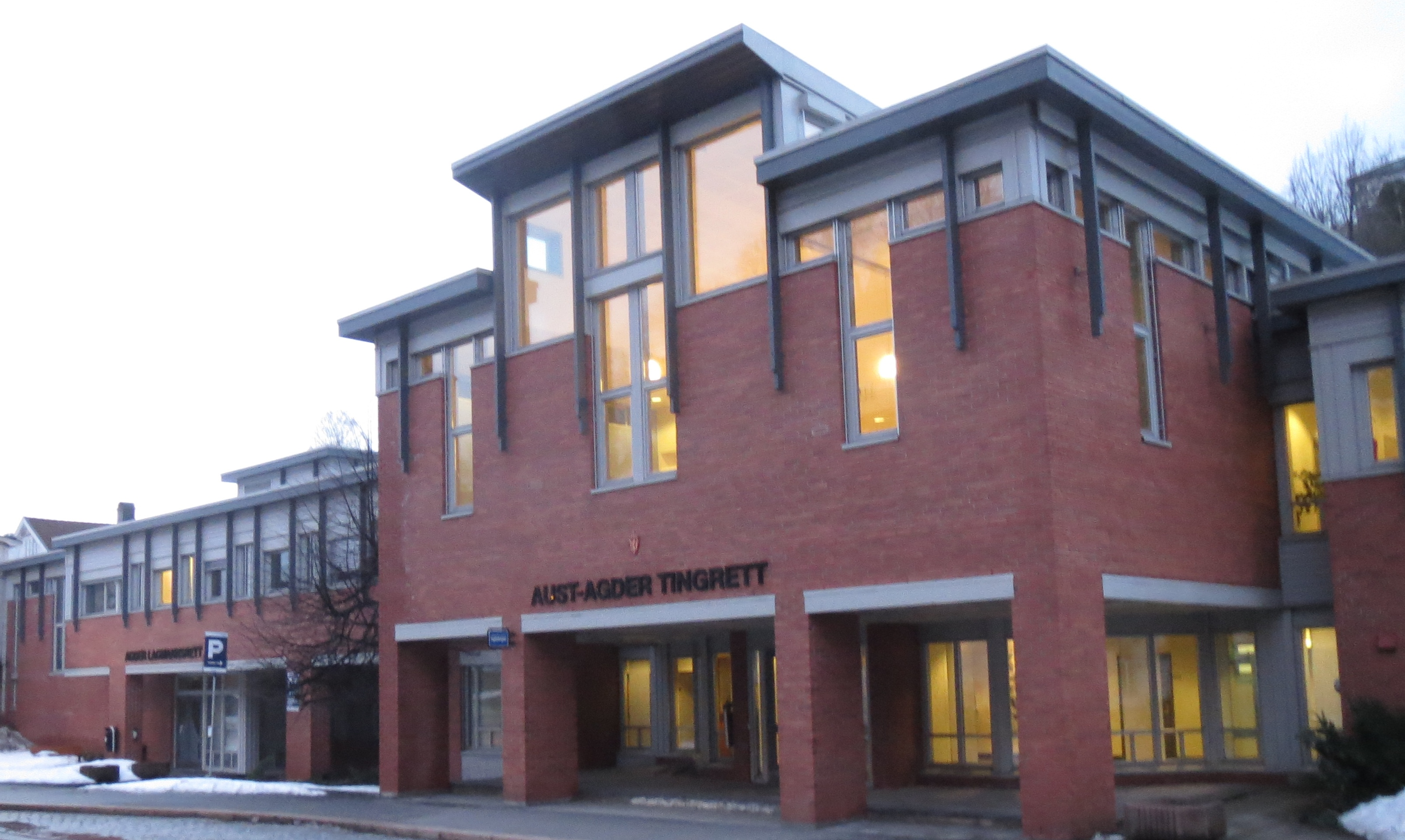
- Arendal Courthouse
- Interactive map of Aust-Agder District Court
- 58.464455°N 8.761558°E
- Established: 1 Sept 2004
- Dissolved: 26 April 2021
- Jurisdiction: Eastern Aust-Agder
- Location: Blødekjær 3 Arendal, Norway
- Coordinates: 58.464455°N 8.761558°E
- Appeals to: Agder Court of Appeal

Aust-Agder District Court (Norwegian: Aust-Agder tingrett) was a district court in Agder county, Norway. The court was based in the town of Arendal. The court existed from 2004 until 2021. It had jurisdiction over the eastern part of the county which included the municipalities of Grimstad, Arendal, Froland, Åmli, Tvedestrand, Vegårshei, Risør, and Gjerstad. Cases from this court could be appealed to Agder Court of Appeal.

The court was a court of first instance. Its judicial duties were mainly to settle criminal cases and to resolve civil litigation as well as bankruptcy. The administration and registration tasks of the court included death registration, issuing certain certificates, performing duties of a notary public, and officiating civil wedding ceremonies. Cases from this court were heard by a combination of professional judges and lay judges.

== History ==
This court was established on 1 September 2004 when the old Nedenes District Court, Holt District Court, and Sand District Court were merged to form the current court. On 26 April 2021, Aust-Agder District Court was merged with the Kristiansand District Court and Lister District Court to create the new Agder District Court.
