= Randesund =

District Randesund
- District
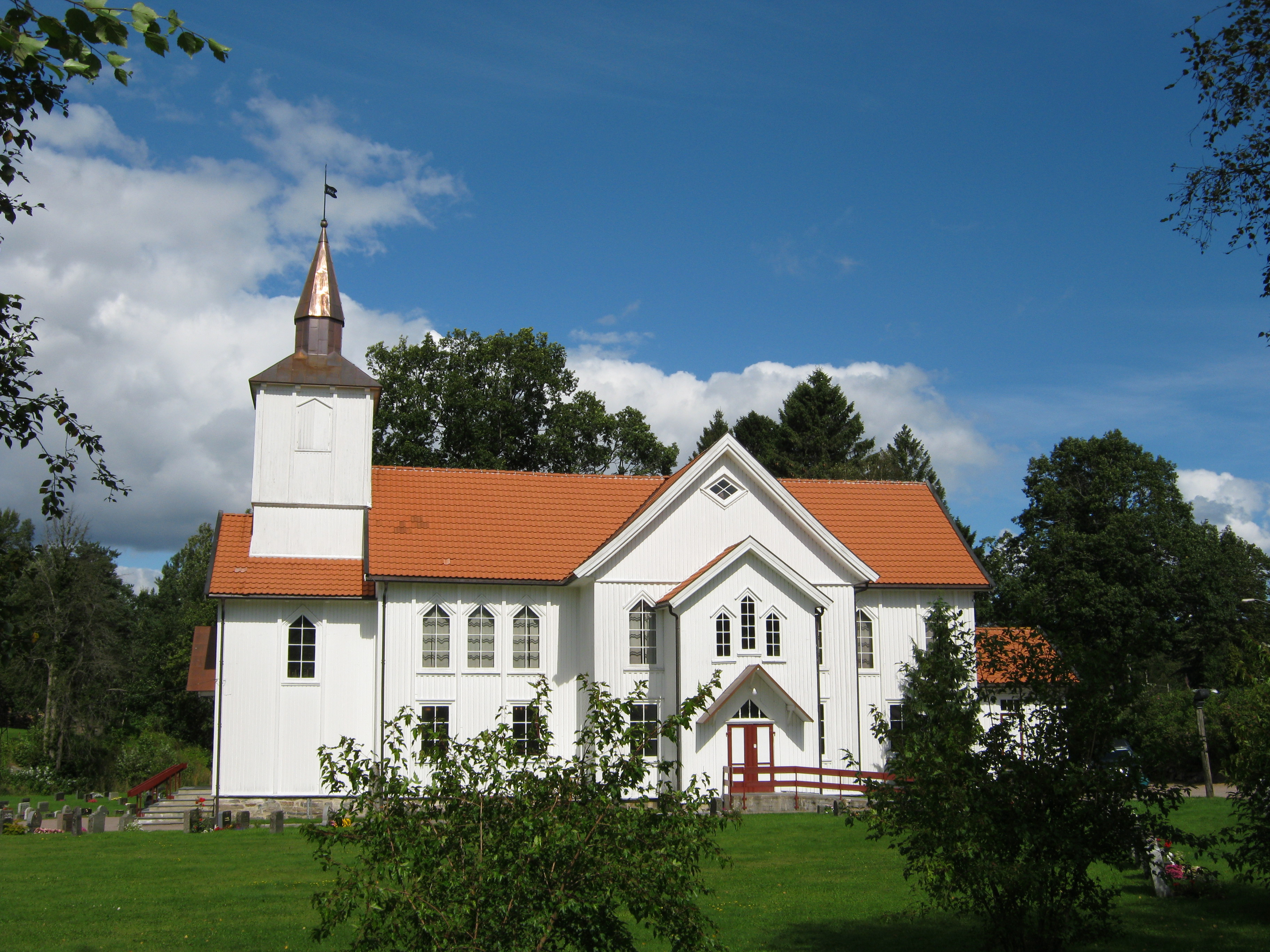
- View of the local Randesund Church

- Coat of arms

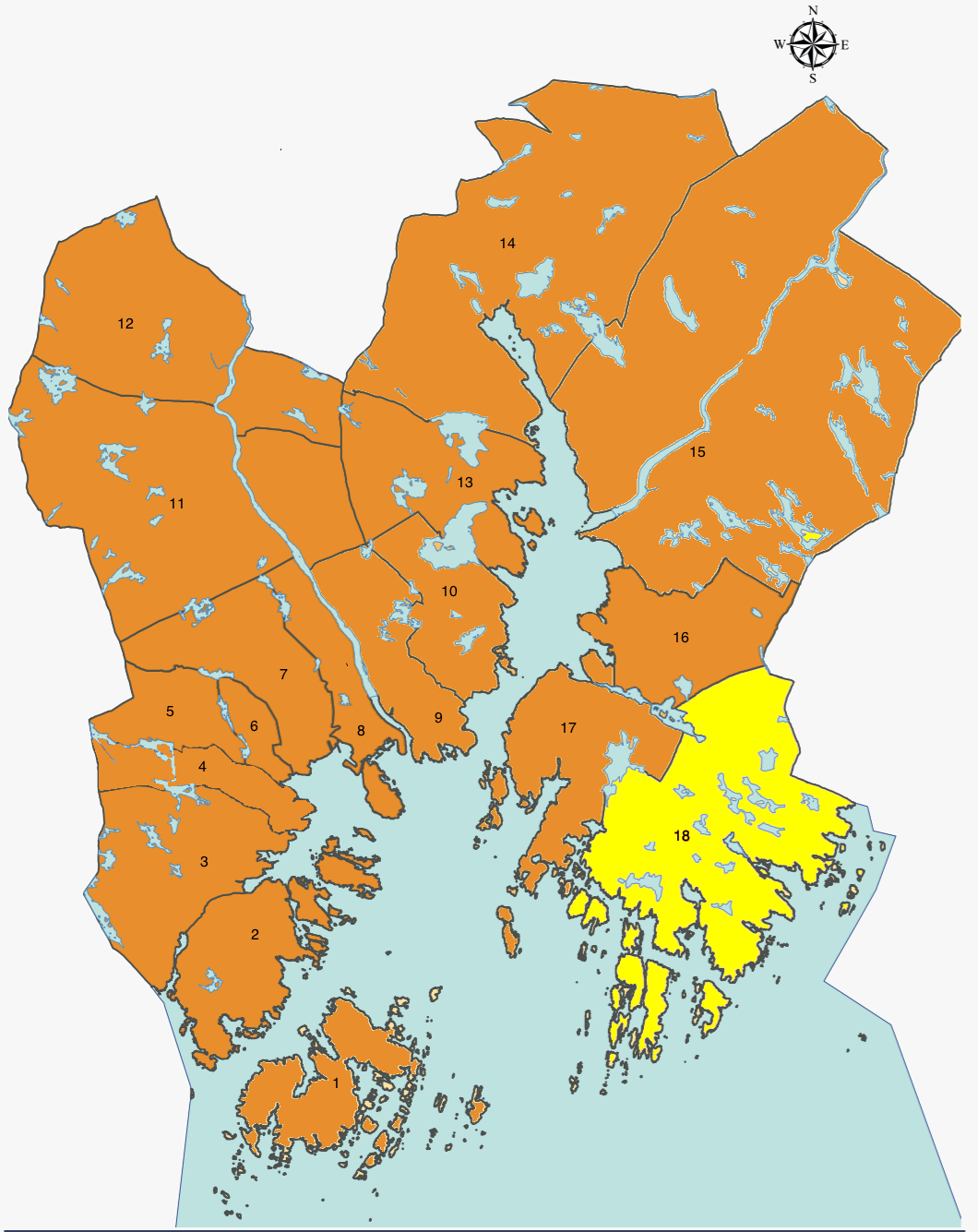
- Interactive map of District Randesund
- Coordinates: 58.1342°N 08.1176°E
- Country: Norway
- Region: Southern Norway
- County: Agder
- Municipality: Kristiansand
- Borough: Oddernes
- Elevation: 26 m (85 ft)

Population (2014)
  - Total: 2,000
- Time zone: UTC+01:00 (CET)
  - Summer (DST): UTC+02:00 (CEST)
- ISO 3166 code: NO-030112
- Website: kristiansand.kommune.no

Randesund is a village and district within the city of Kristiansand in Agder county, Norway. The district is located within the borough of Oddernes along the southern coastline between the two fjords (Kvåsefjorden and Topdalsfjorden) and south of the districts of Søm and Hånes. There are several small islands just off the coast of Randesund, including Dvergsøya, Randøya, and Herøya, all popular tourist destinations. The village of Randesund is located in the central part of the district and it is the site of Randesund Church. There was a separate Randesund Municipality (larger than the present-day district) that existed from 1893 until 1965.

== Name ==
The district, (originally the parish) is named after the island, Randøen (now known as Randøya). The first part of the name is rand (Old Norse: rǫnd) which means "boundary" or "edge" and the last part of the name is sund which means "strait". The name was previously spelled Randøsund.

== Politics ==
The 10 largest politics parties in Randesund in 2015:

Kristiansand city council votes from Randesund 2015
Conservative Party	25% (252 votes)
Christian Democratic Party	21,7% (218 votes)
Labour Party	19,8% (199 votes)
Progress Party	9,4% (95 votes)
The Democrats	6,1% (61 votes)
Liberal Party	4,3% (43 votes)
Green Party	4% (40 votes)
Pensioners'	3,3% (33 votes)
The Christians	2,2% (22 votes)
Socialist Left Party	1,6% (16 votes)
Others	2,9% (29 votes)
Total	1008 votes

== Transportation ==
The main road to Tømmerstø is Norwegian County Road 3, which goes from Rona in Søm, to Drange. It goes through Tømmerstø. Norwegian County Road 9 goes from Dvergsnes, to Tangen both in Randesund. Norwegian County Road 4 goes from Bjørnestad to Kongshavn in Randesund. Norwegian County Road 14 goes from Frikstad to Stangenes. Norwegian County Road 401 goes from Randesund to Høvåg and Lillesand.

Bus transportation from/through Randesund
Line	Destination
08	Randesund - Rona
17	Tømmerstø - Hellemyr
17	Tømmerstø-Frikstad - Hellemyr
17	Tømmerstø - Kvadraturen
N17	Tømmerstø - Kvadraturen
18	Tømmerstø Odderhei-Holte - Hellemyr
18	Dvergsnes - Hellemyr
18	Tømmerstø Odderhei-Holte - Kvadraturen
A18	Tømmerstø Odderhei-Holte - Eg-Sykehuset
139	Høvåg-Lillesand - Kristiansand
234	Randesund - Kringsjå

== Neighborhoods ==
- Bjørkestøl
- Butangen
- Drange
- Drangeskauen
- Dvergsnes
- Eftevåg
- Fidje
- Frikstad
- Hestehagen
- Holte
- Kirkevik
- Kongshavn
- Kvarnes
- Lykkedrag
- Odderhei
- Rabbersvik
- Skaupemyr
- Sommerro
- Stangenes
- Tømmerstø
- Tømmeråsen
- Vadvik
- Vrånes

== Media gallery ==
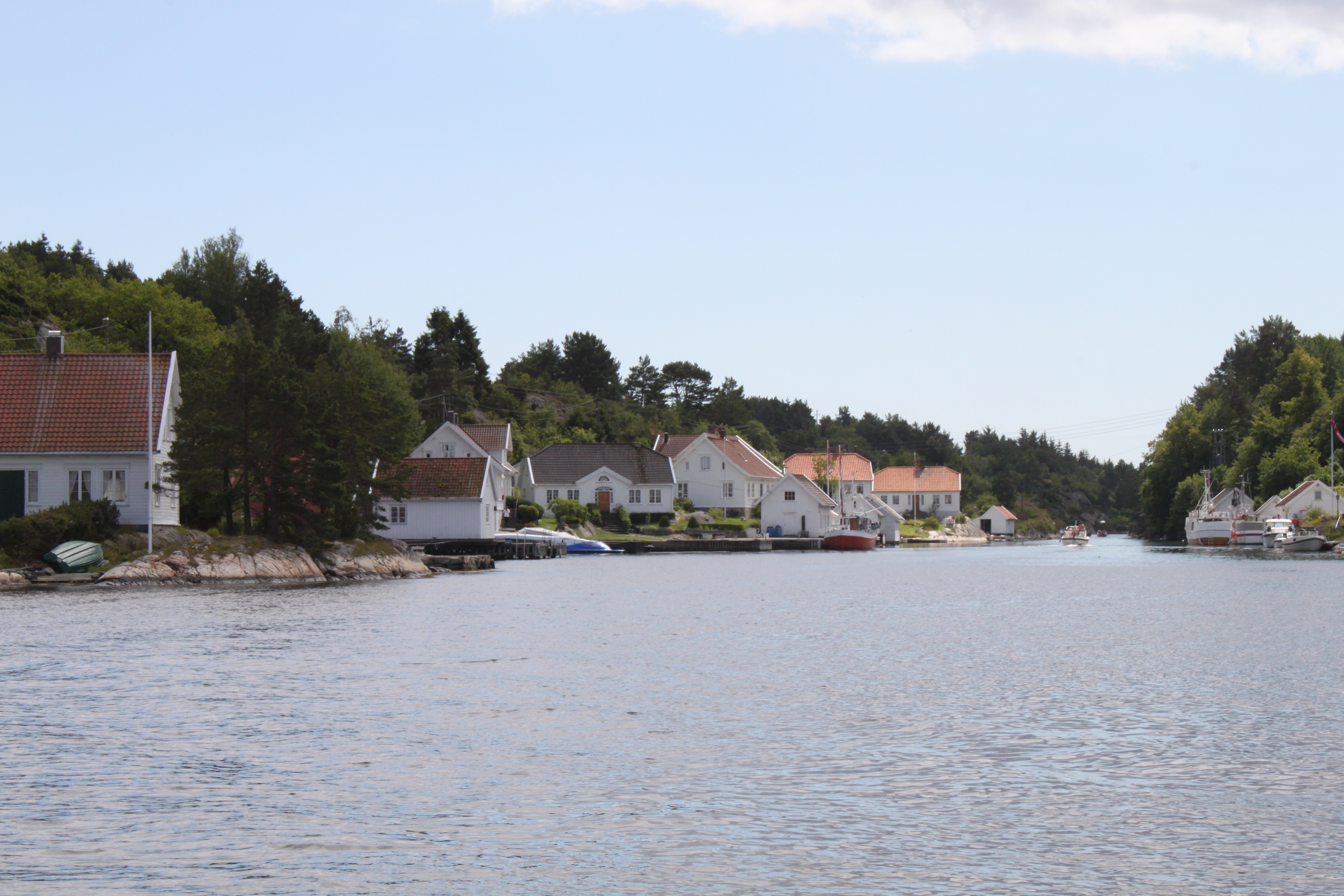
Skippergada

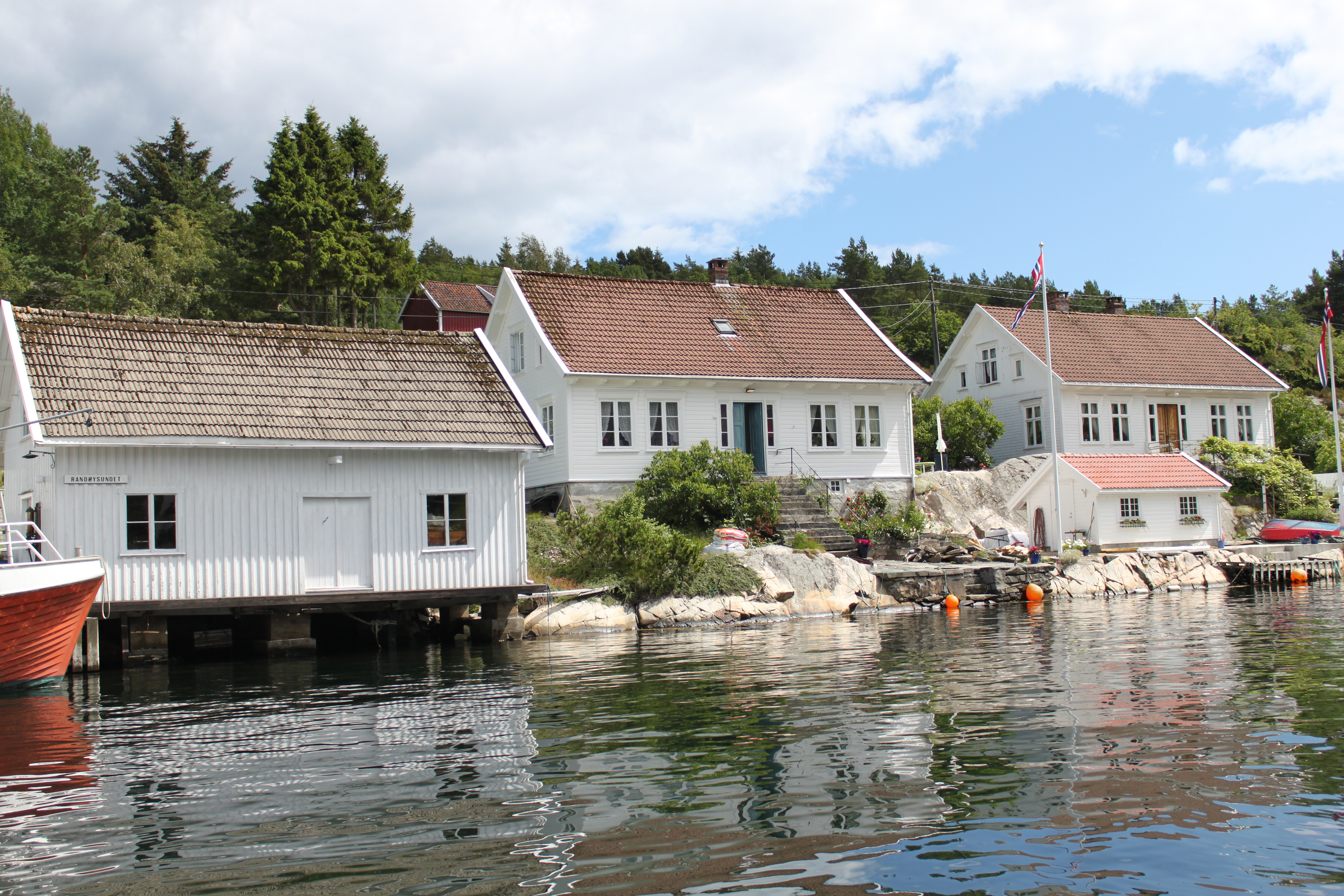
Skippergada

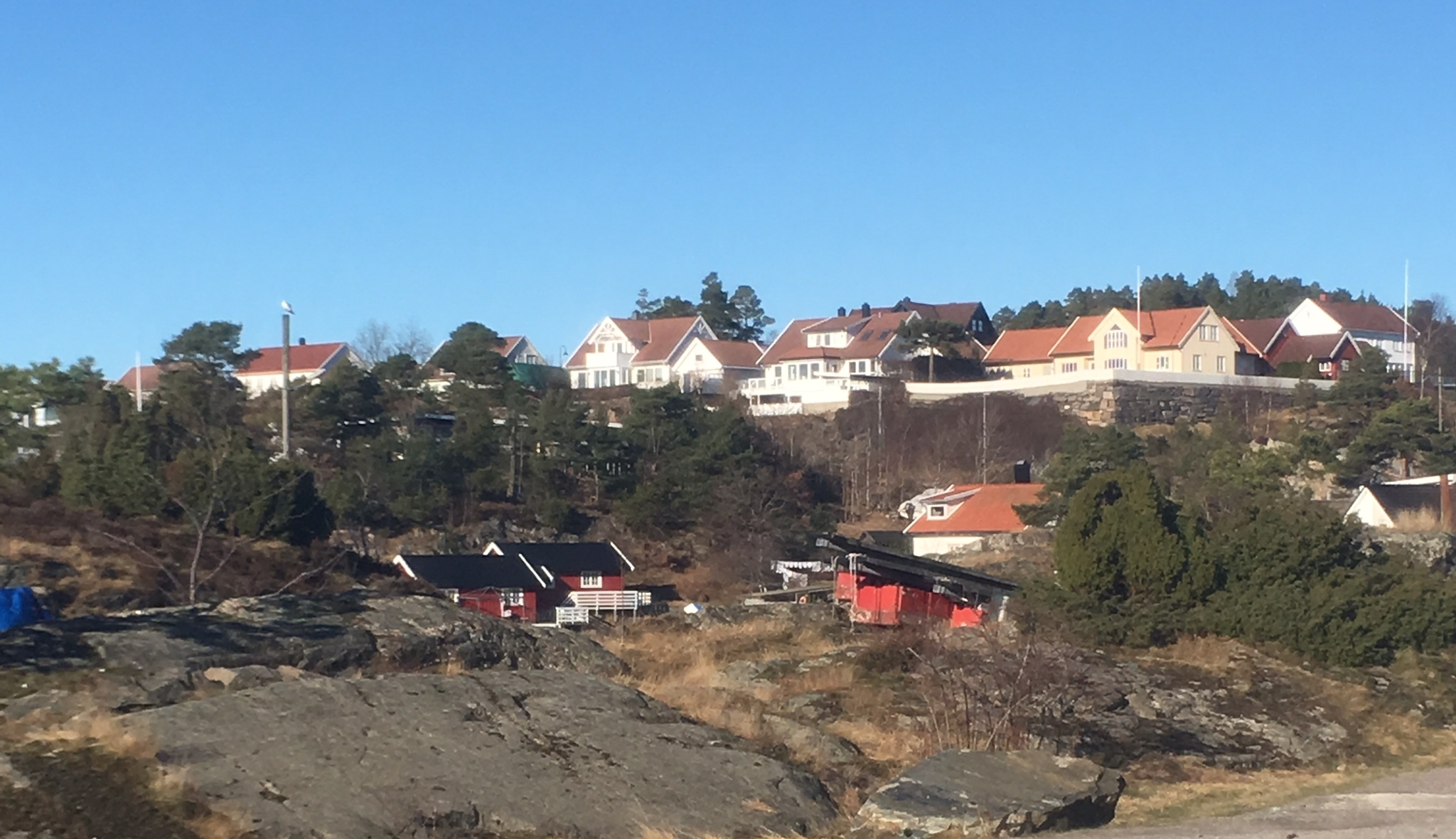
Rabbesvik

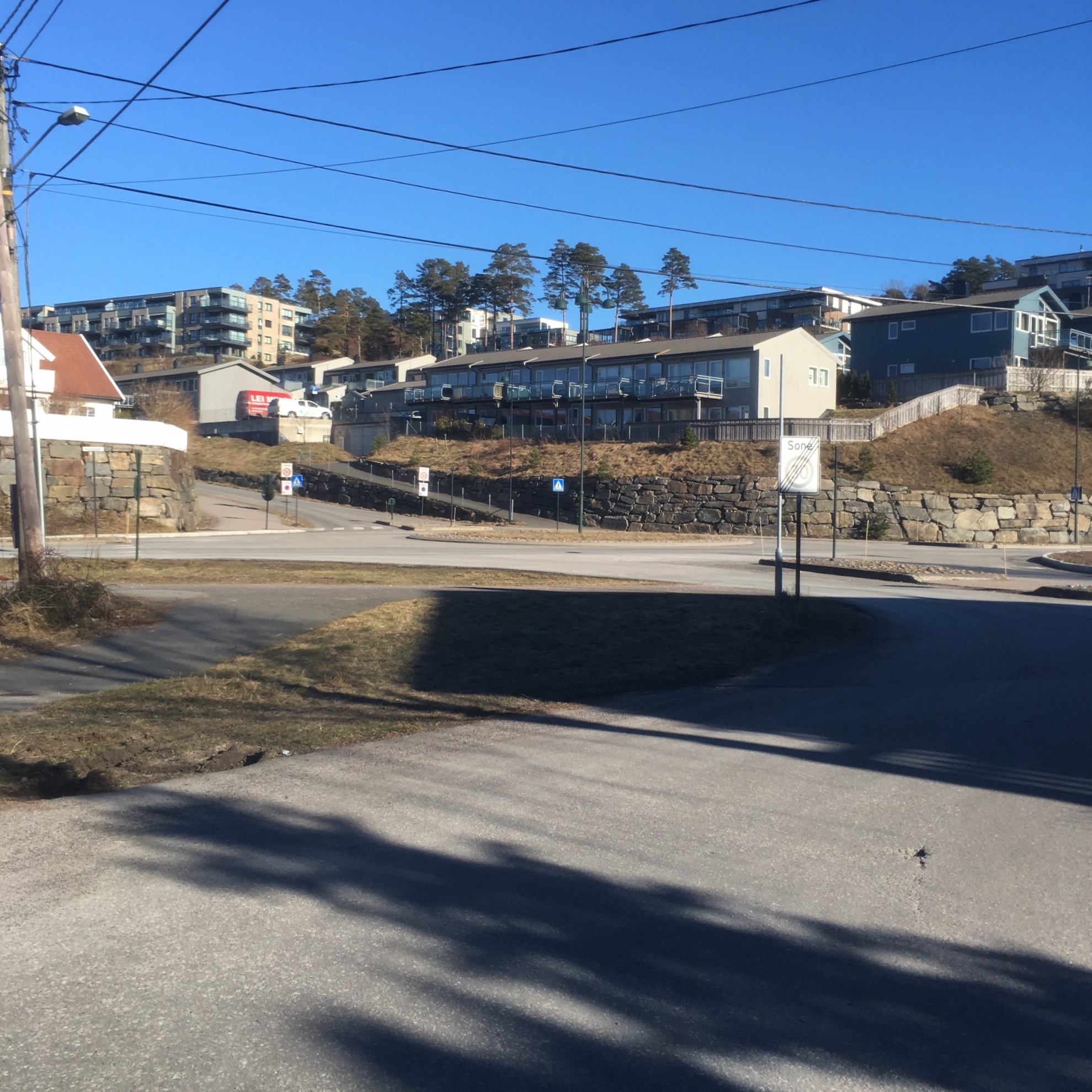
Fidjeåsen

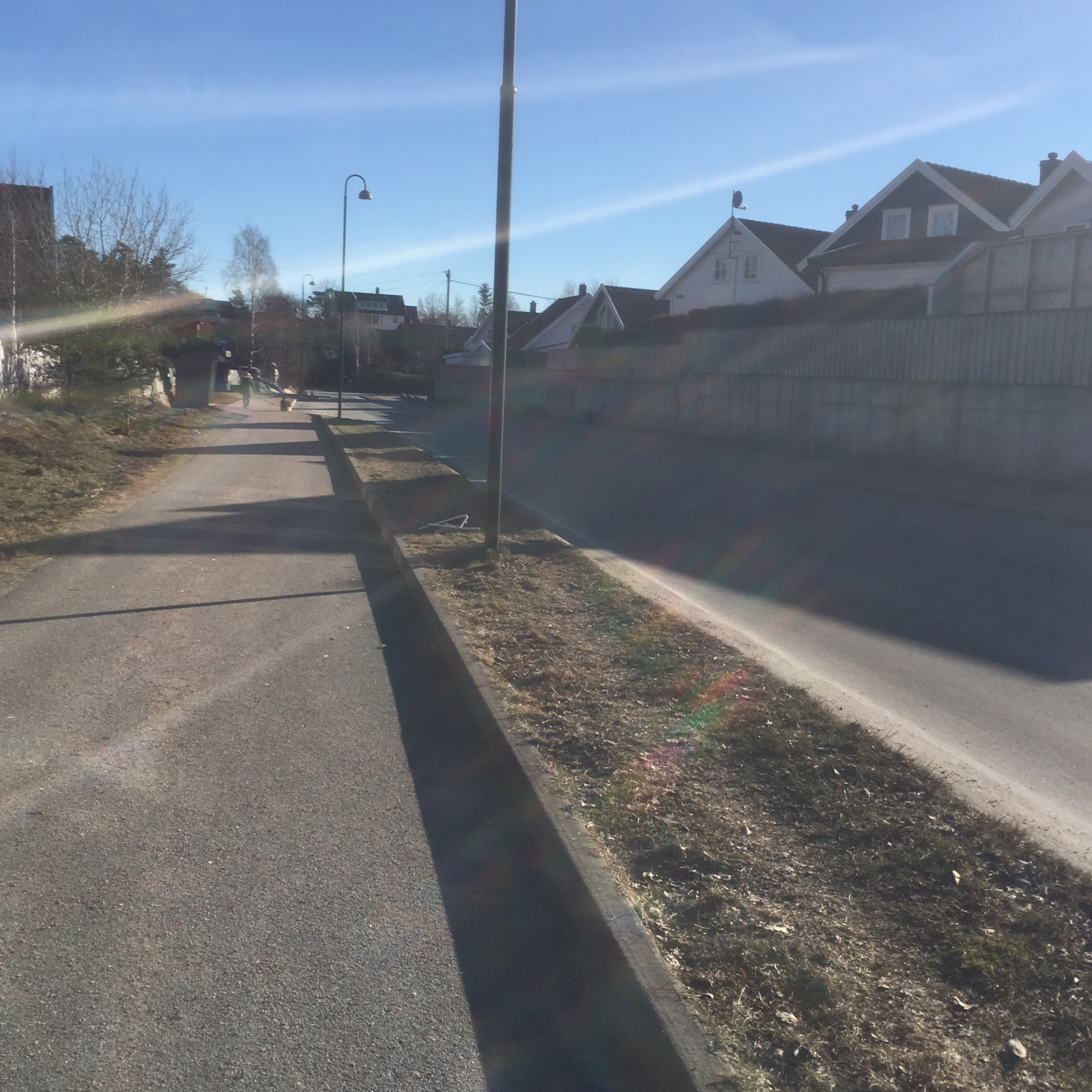
Holte

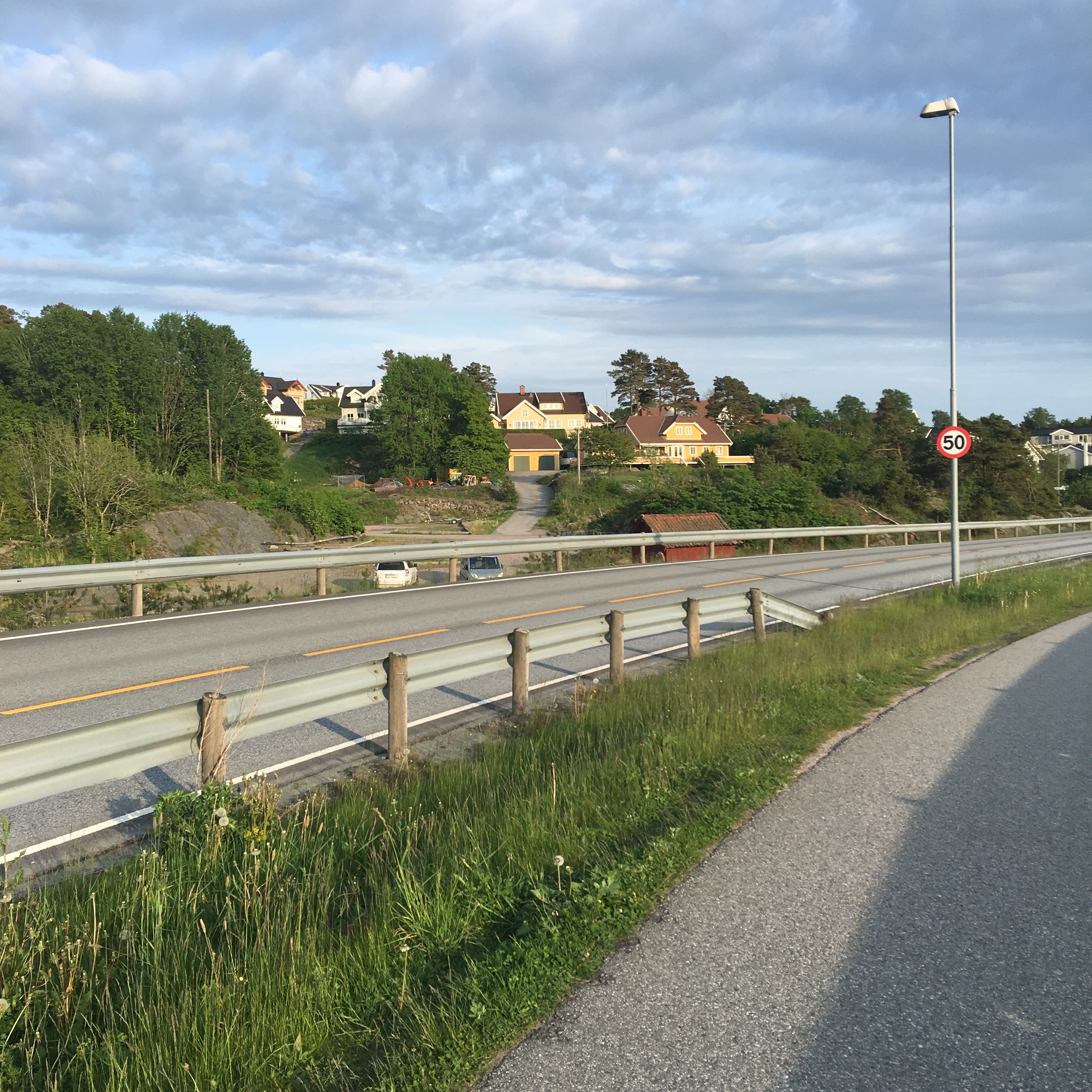
Holte

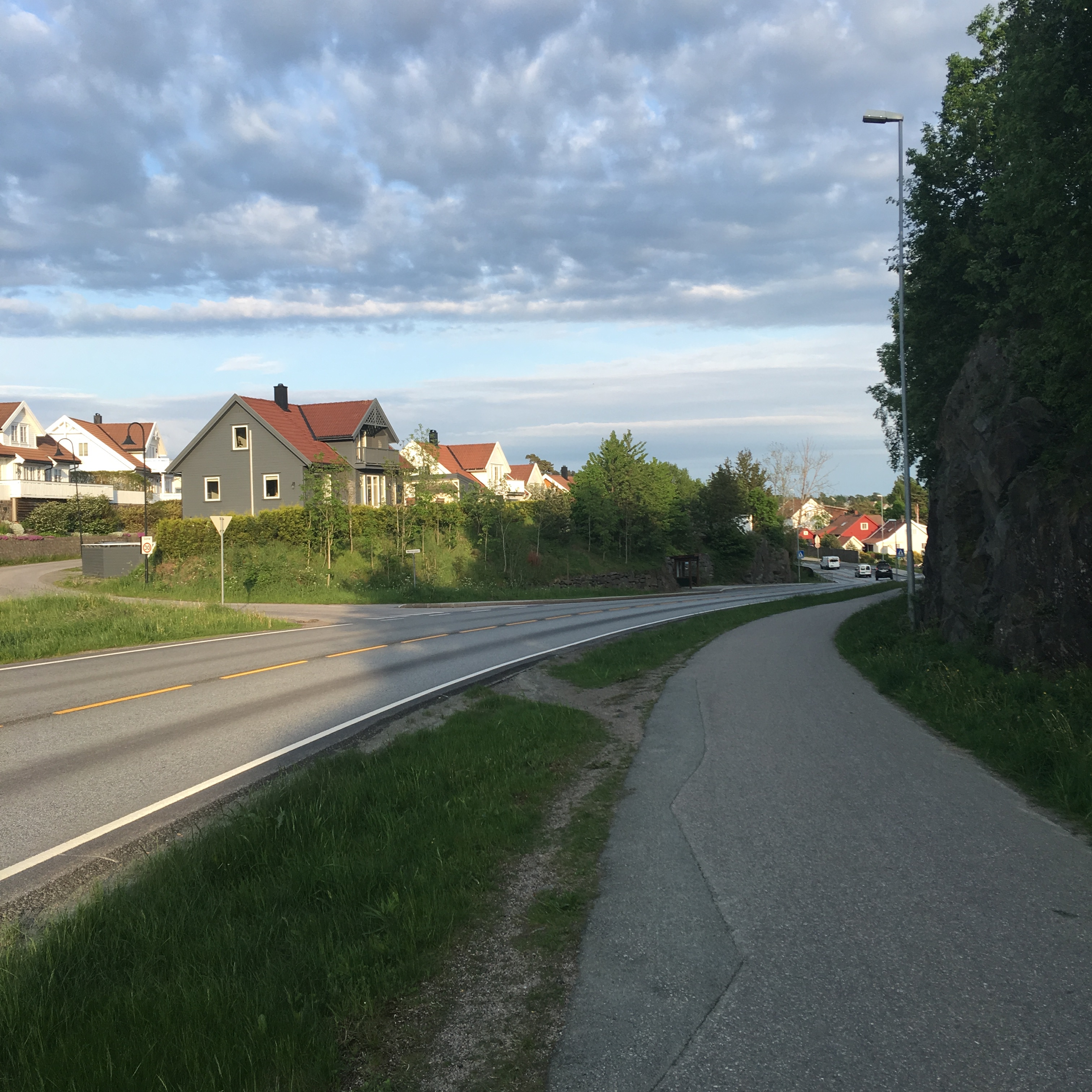
Norwegian County Road 3

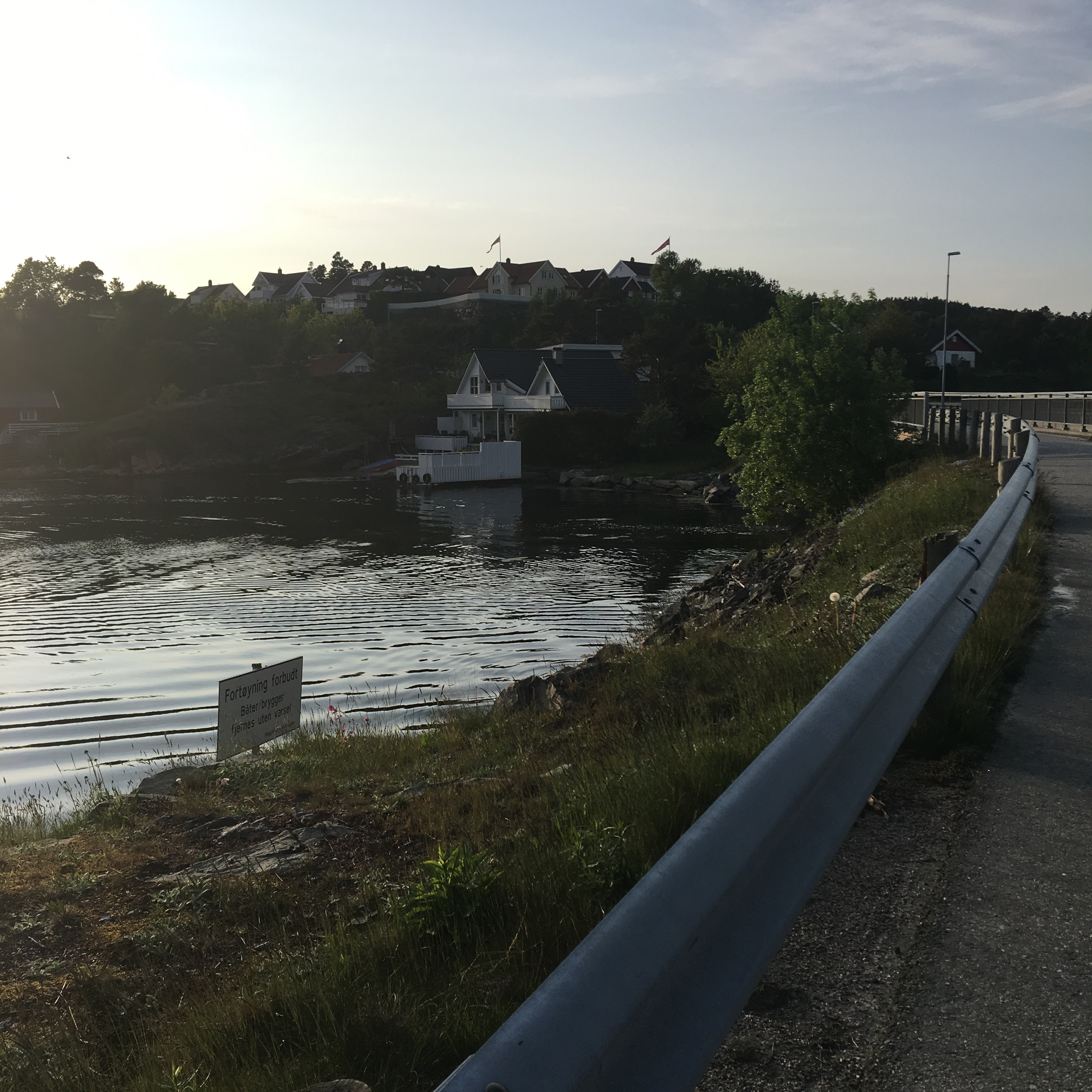
Fidjekilen

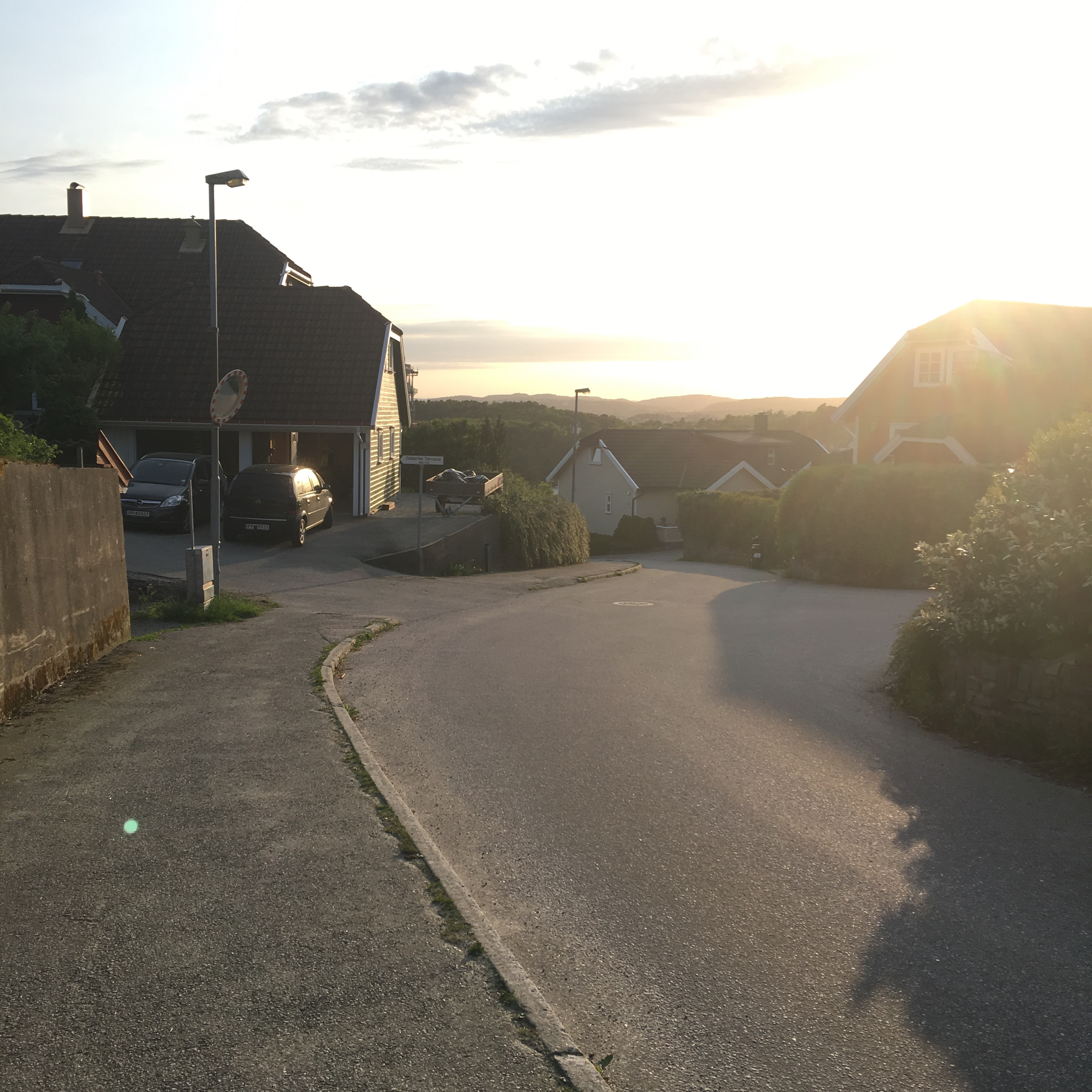
Odderhei Terrasse

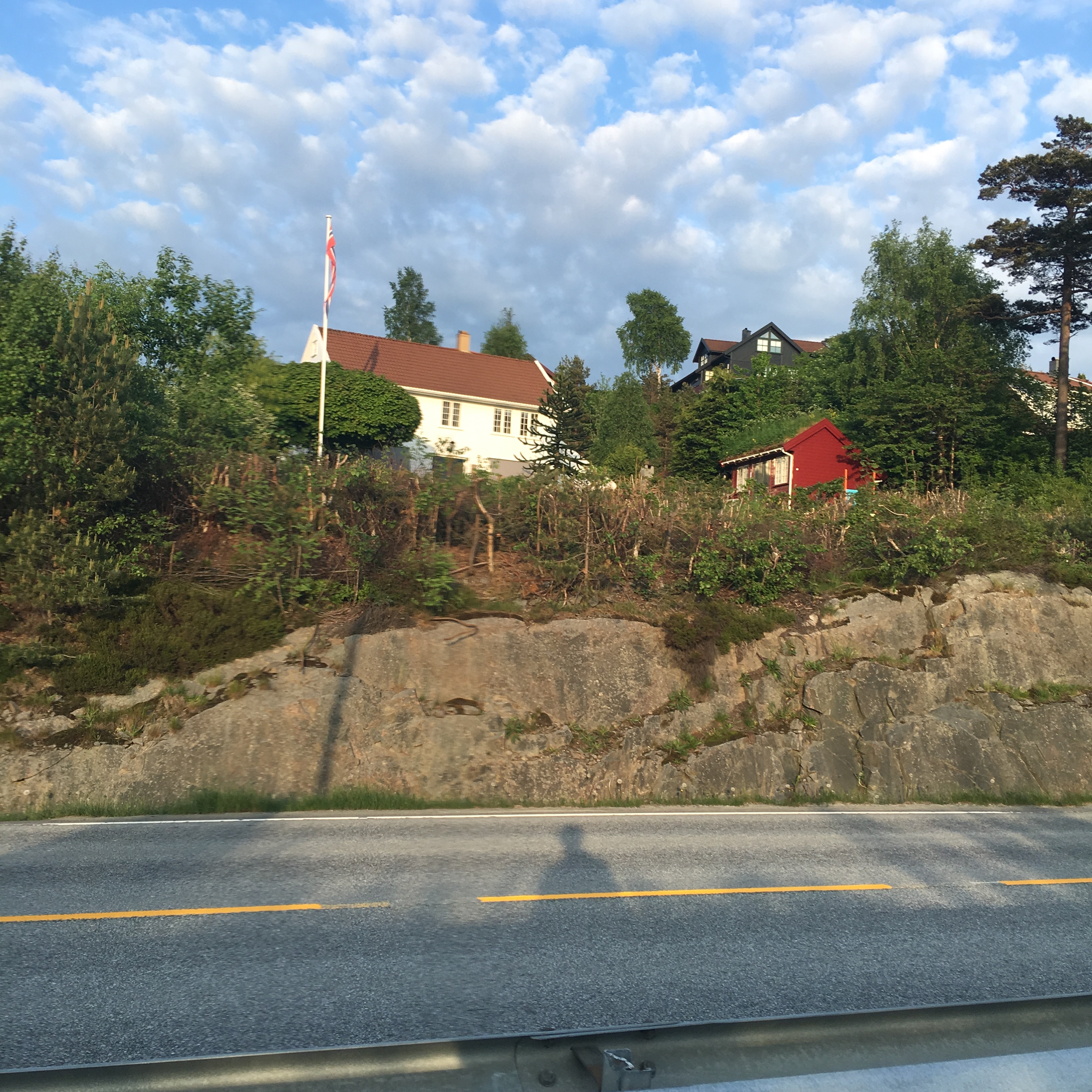
Odderhei
