= Tømmerstø =

- Neighborhood in Kristiansand
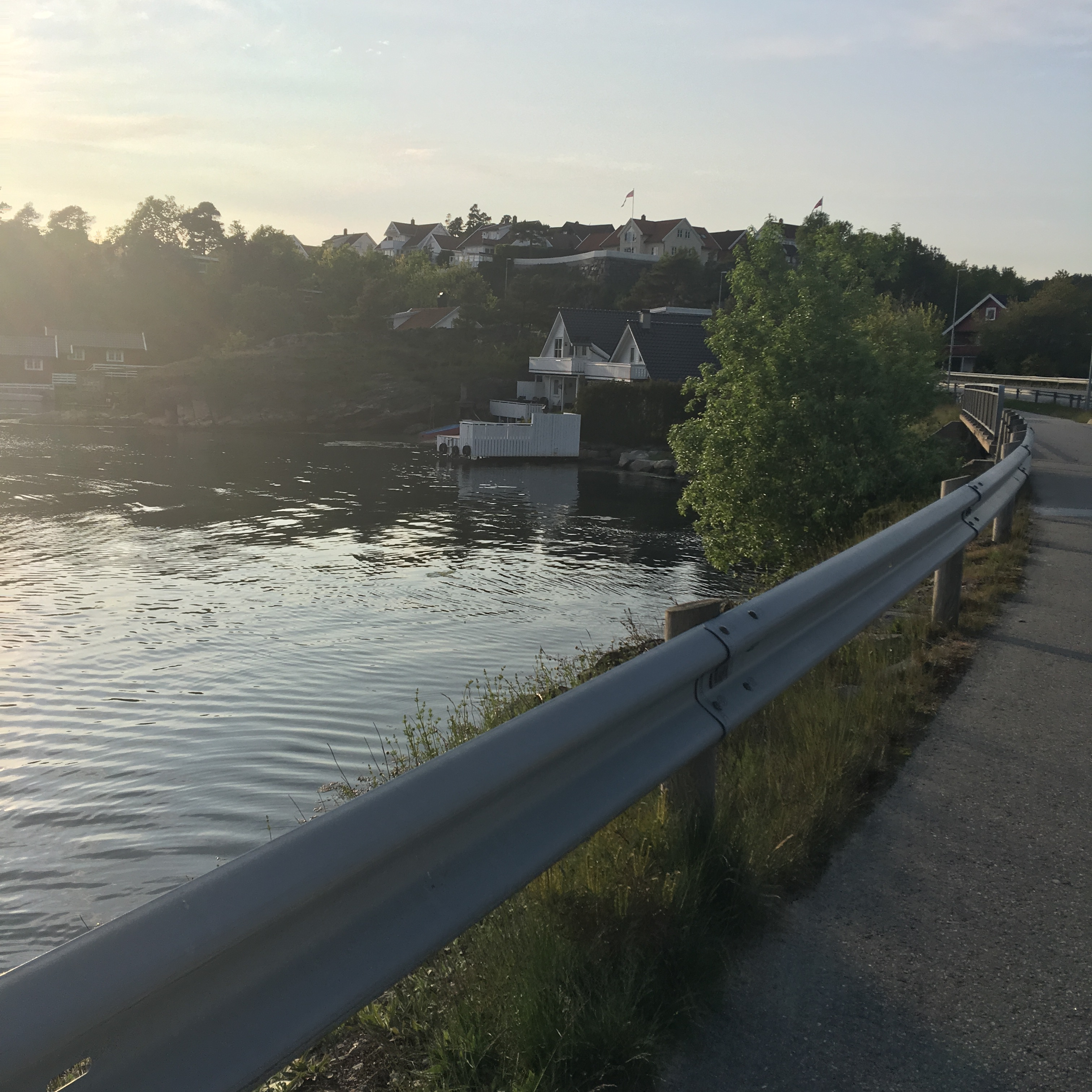
- View of Fidjekilen
- Interactive map of Tømmerstø
- Coordinates: 58.1275°N 08.0904°E
- Country: Norway
- County: Agder
- Municipality: Kristiansand
- Borough: Oddernes
- District: Randesund
- Elevation: 16 m (52 ft)
- Time zone: UTC+01:00 (CET)
  - Summer (DST): UTC+02:00 (CEST)
- Postal code: 4639
- Area code: 38

Tømmerstø is a neighbourhood in the city of Kristiansand in Agder county, Norway. It's located in the borough of Oddernes and in the district of Randesund. The neighborhood of Odderhei lies to the northwest, Holte and Frikstad lie to the northeast, and Kongshavn lies to the southeast.

It is located with the shore in a typical Southern Norway archipelago. The neighborhood is mostly located with large houses and some villas. Tømmerstø is a popular tourist area in the summer with a lot of cabins for rent, The Royal Family of Norway owns a cottage in Tømmerstø. Islands like Herøya, Teistholmen, and Furuholmen are located just offshore.

There are three schools in the area: Dvergsnes skole (an elementary school), Sørlandet Maritime videregående school (a high school), and a junior high school in Holte.

Bus lines from Tømmerstø
Line	Destination
08	Ytre Randesund - Rona
17	Tømmerstø - Hellemyr
17	Tømmerstø-Frikstad - Hellemyr
17X	Tømmerstø - Kvadraturen
18	Tømmerstø Odderhei-Holte - Hellemyr
A25	Tømmerstø Odderhei-Holte - Eg-Sykehuset
N17	Tømmerstø - Kvadraturen
139	Kristiansand - Høvåg (-Lillesand)

== Media gallery ==
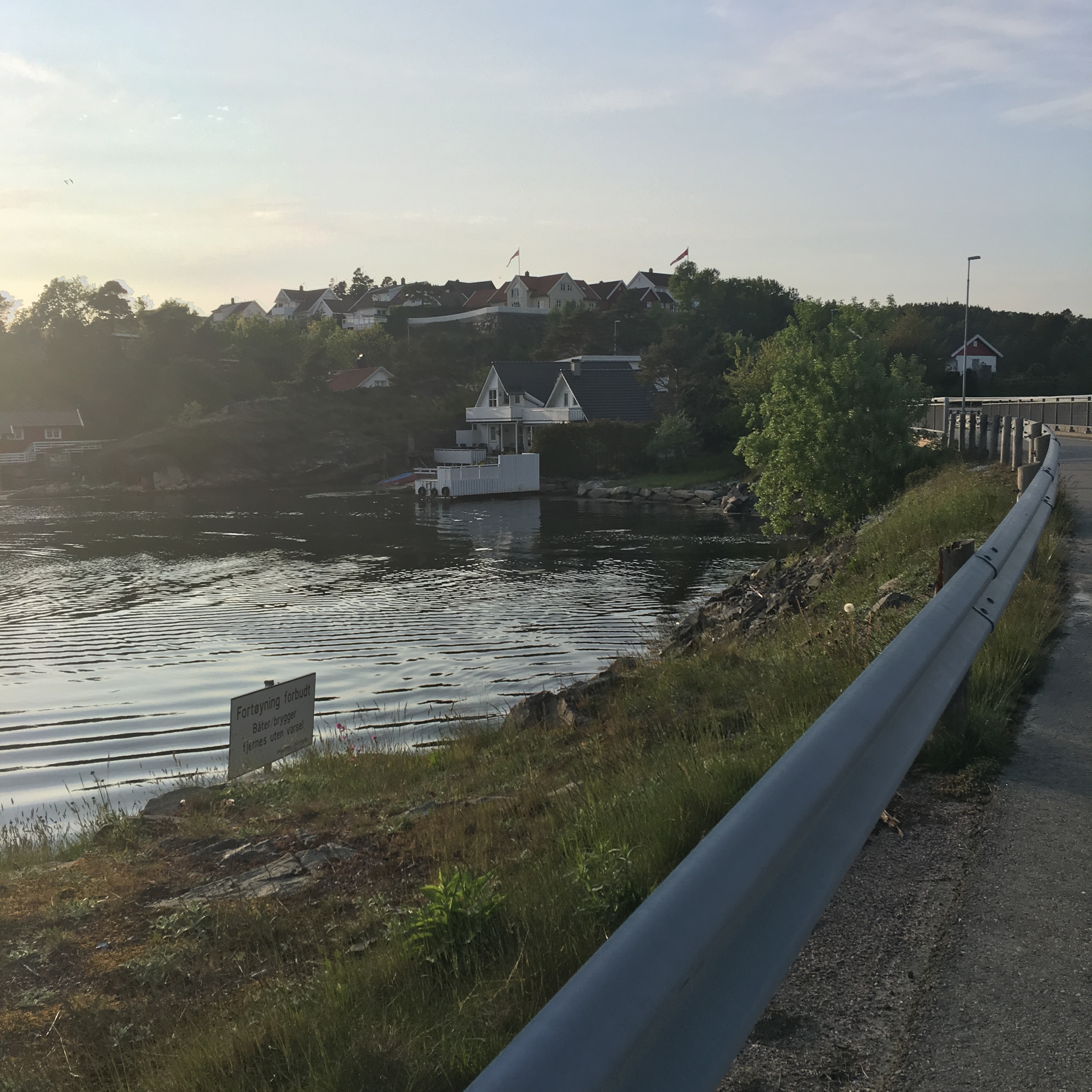
Fidjekilen

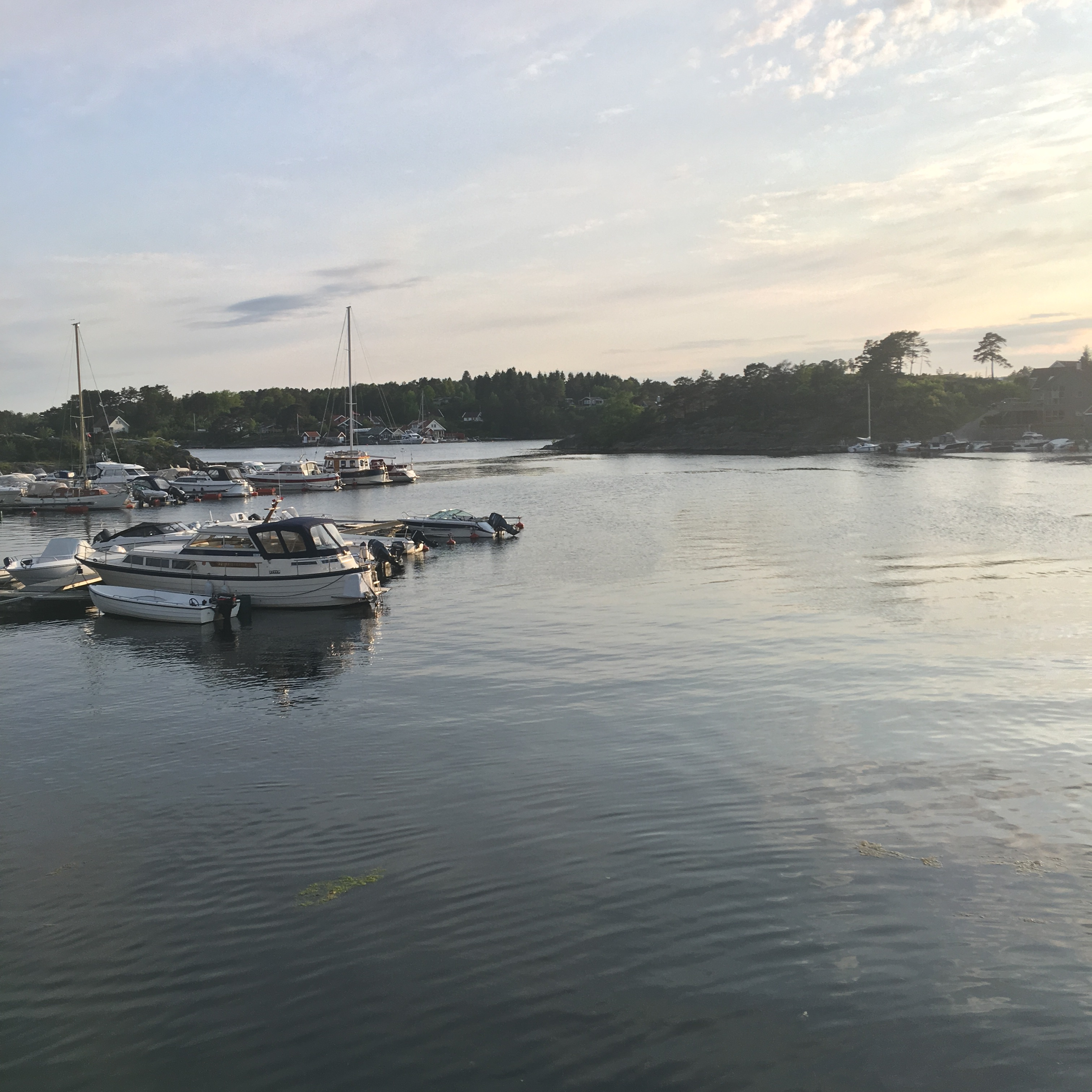
Fidjekilen harbor

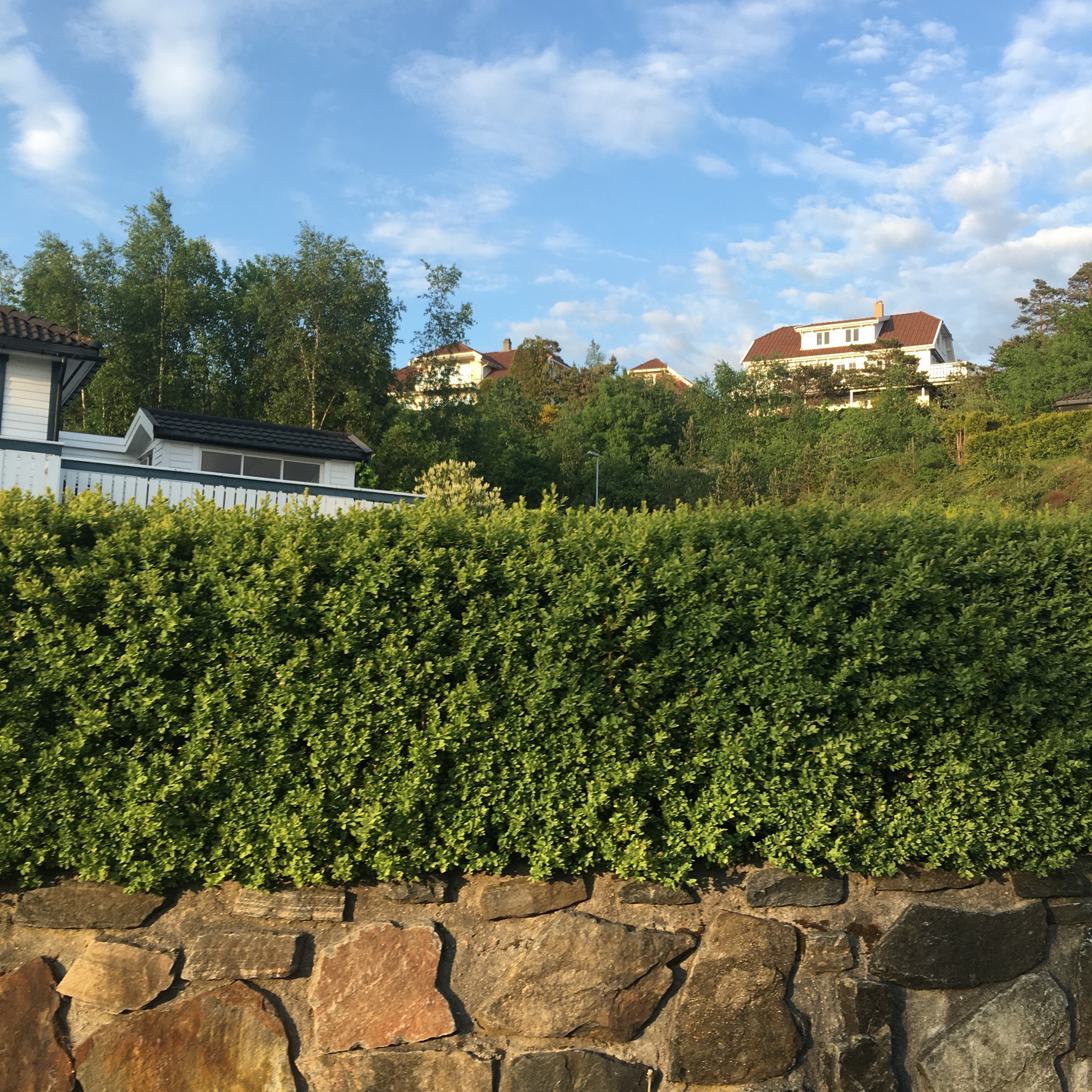
Morildveien

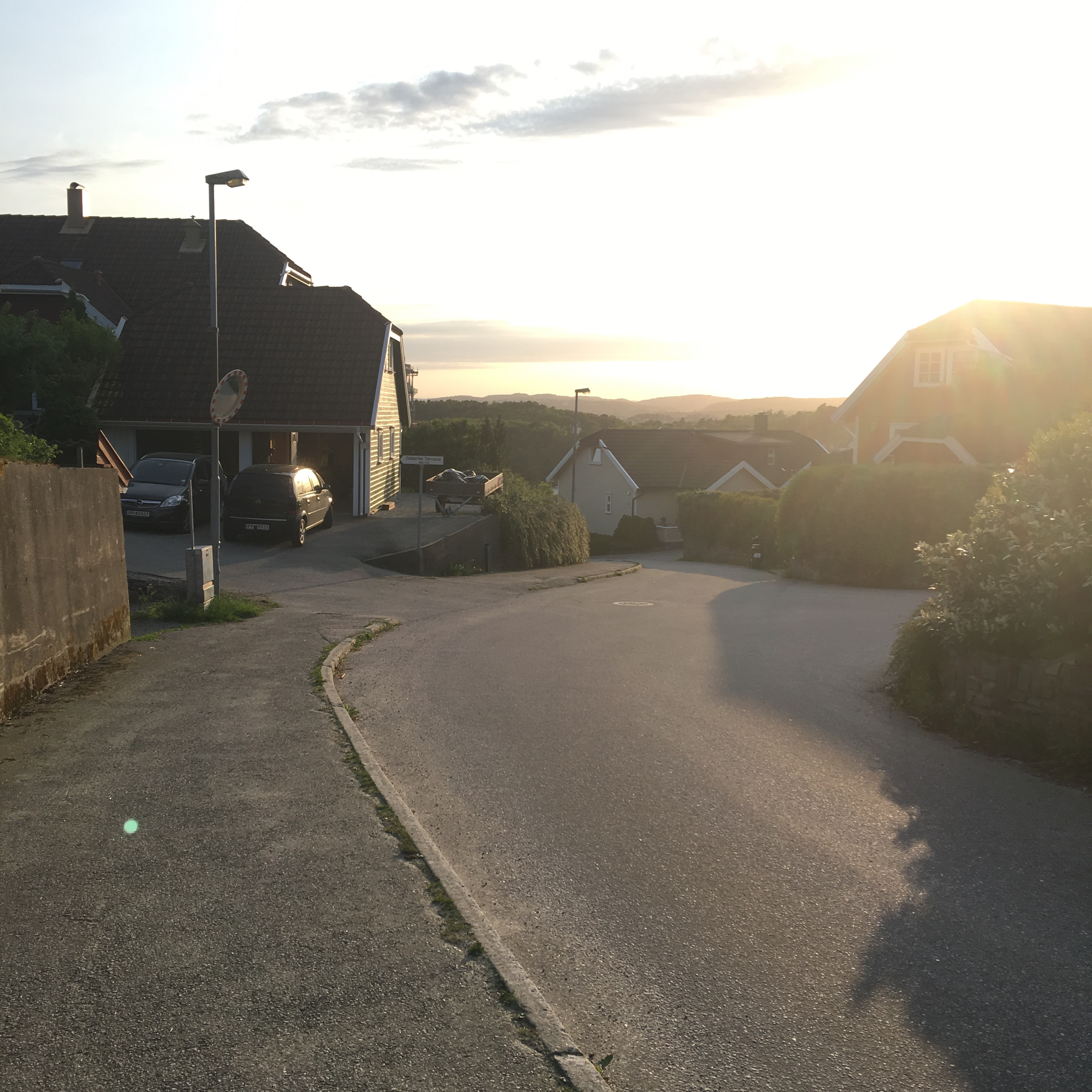
Odderhei Terrasse

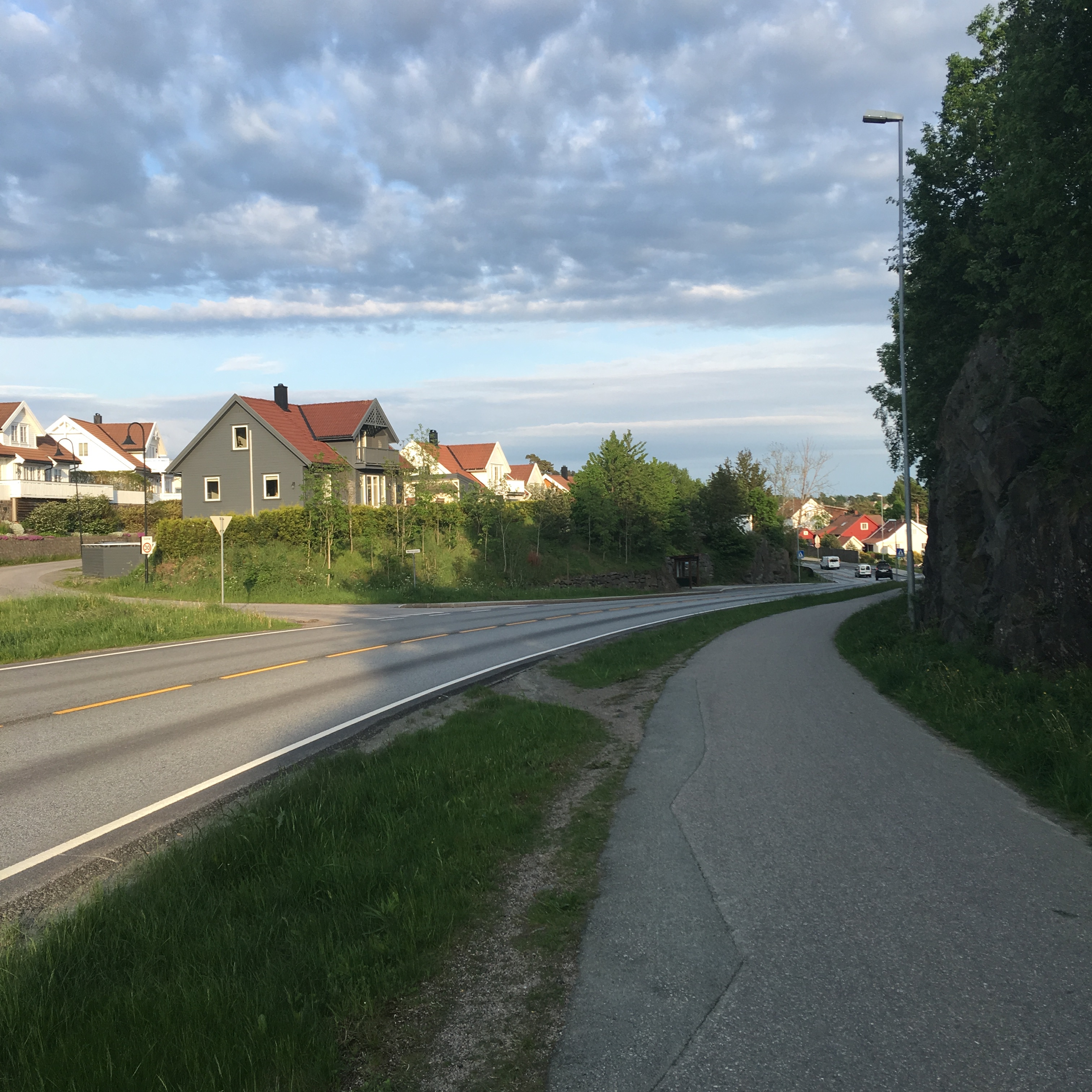
County Road 3, Kystveien, in Tømmerstø

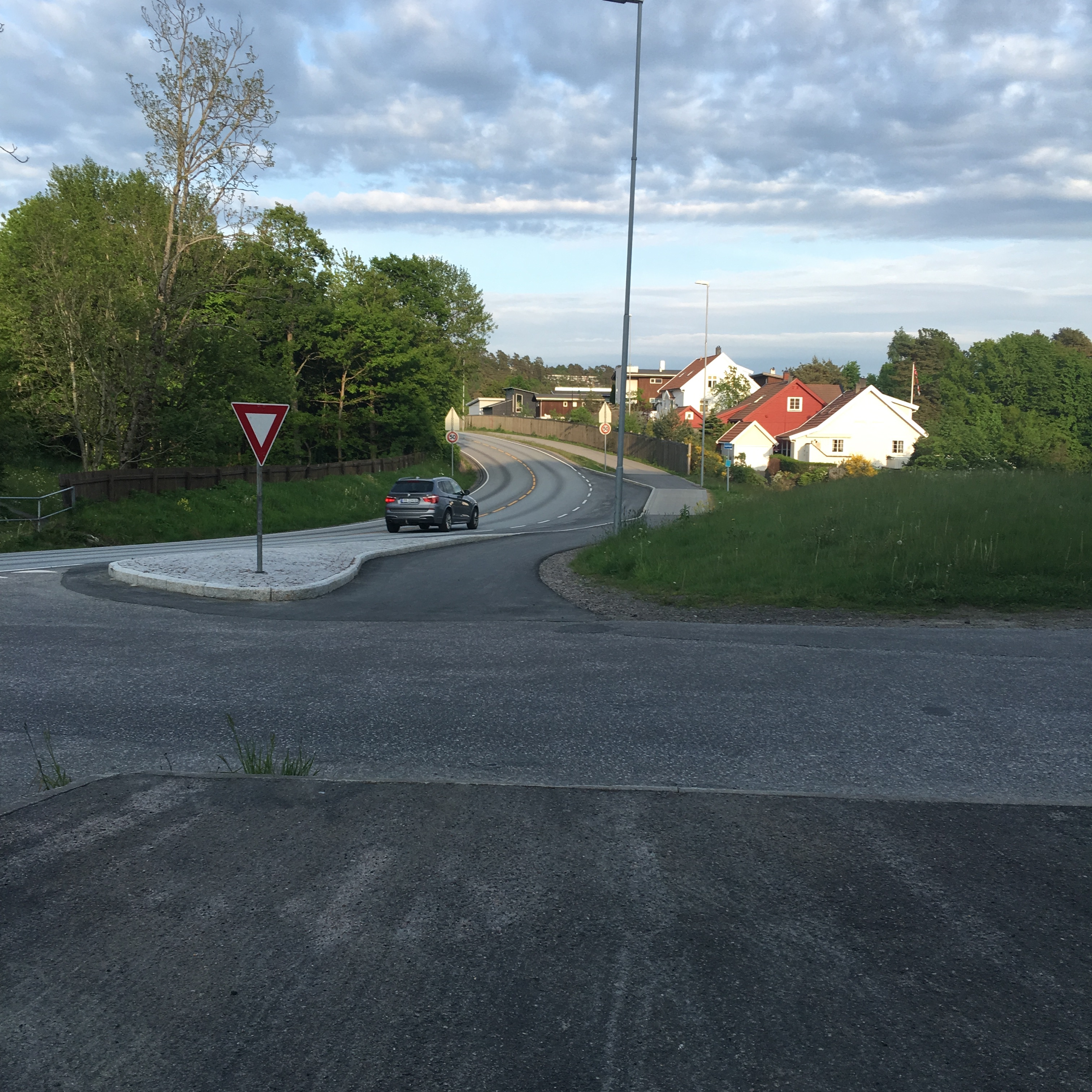
Kystveien with Dreggveien

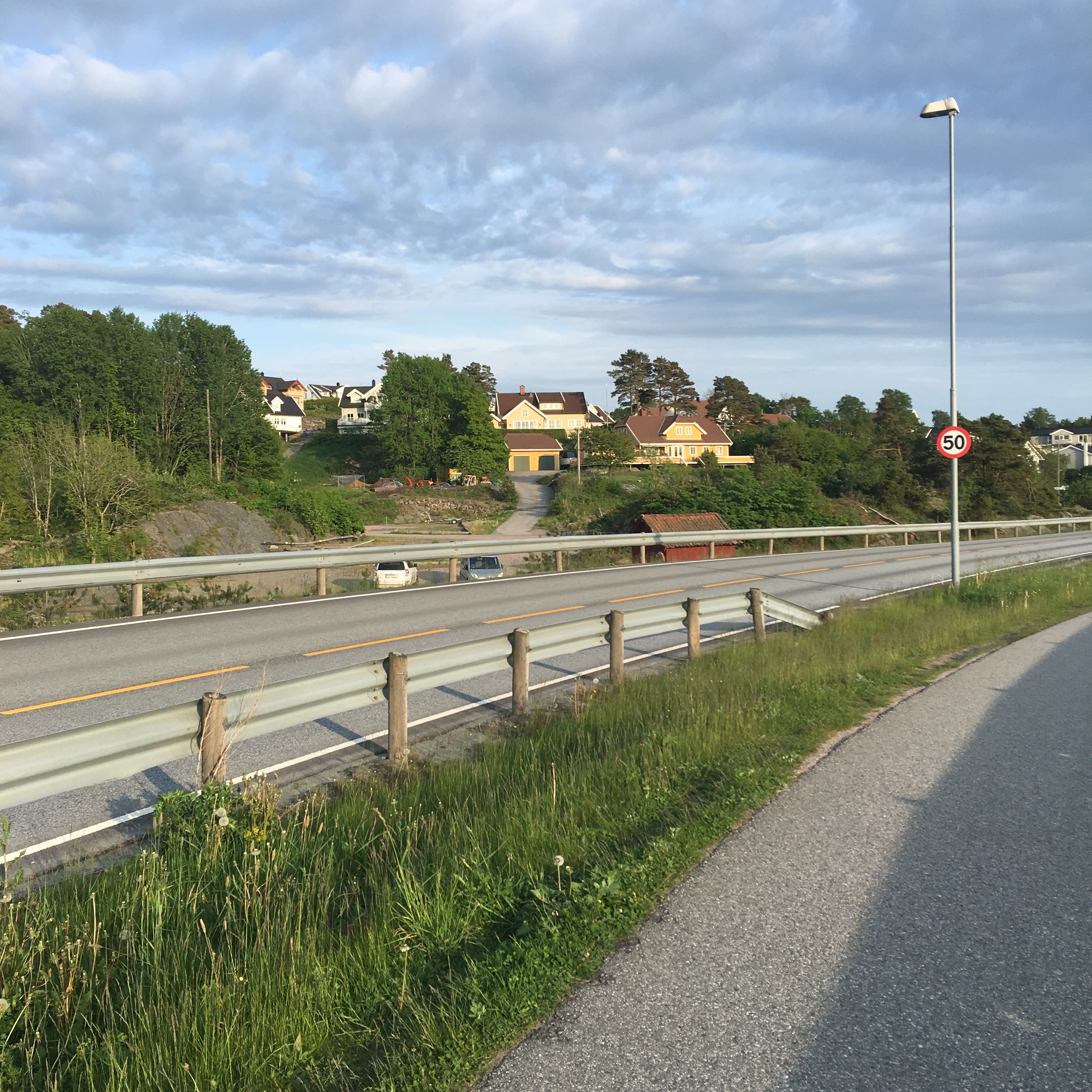
Fidjeåsen, Holte

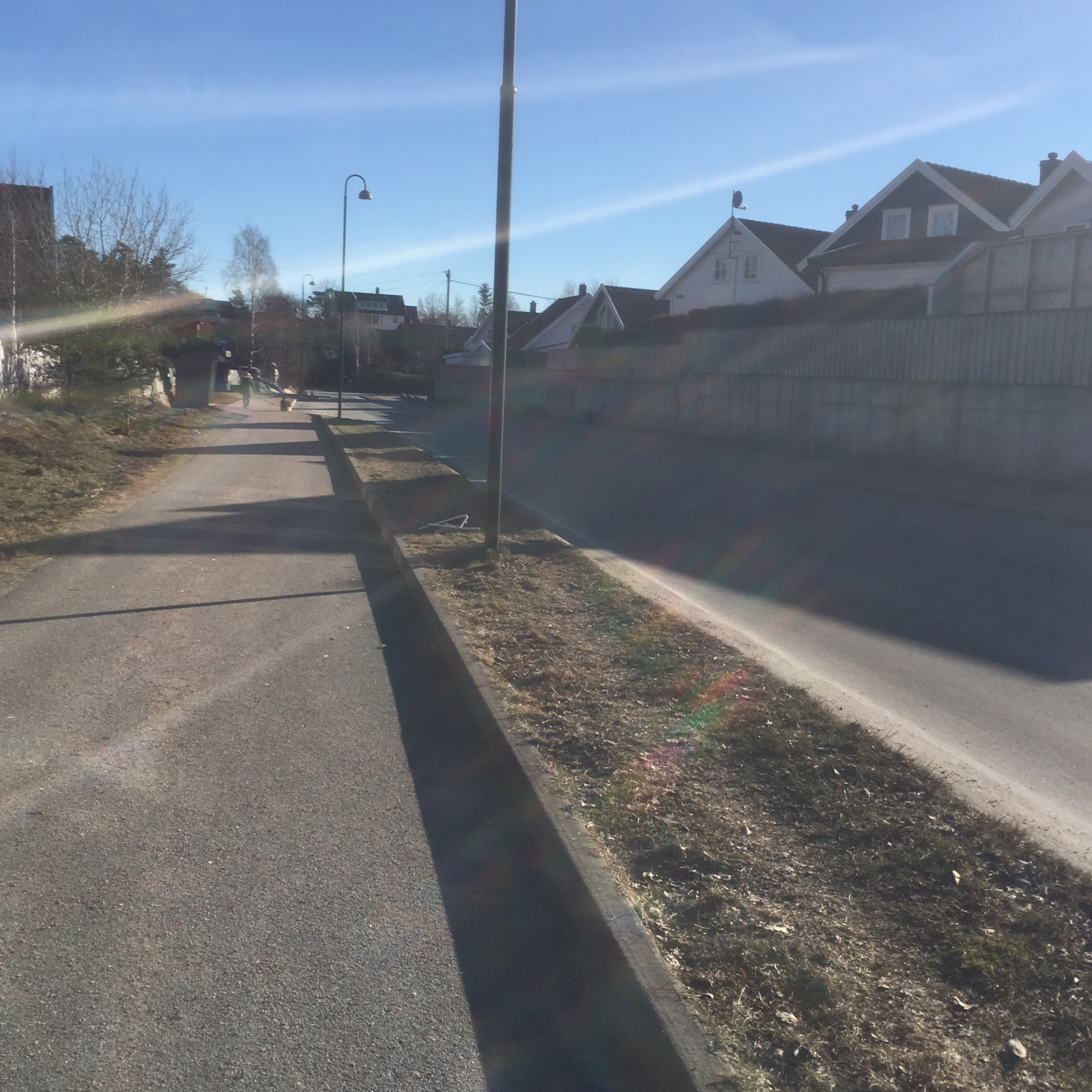
Tømmeråsen, Holte

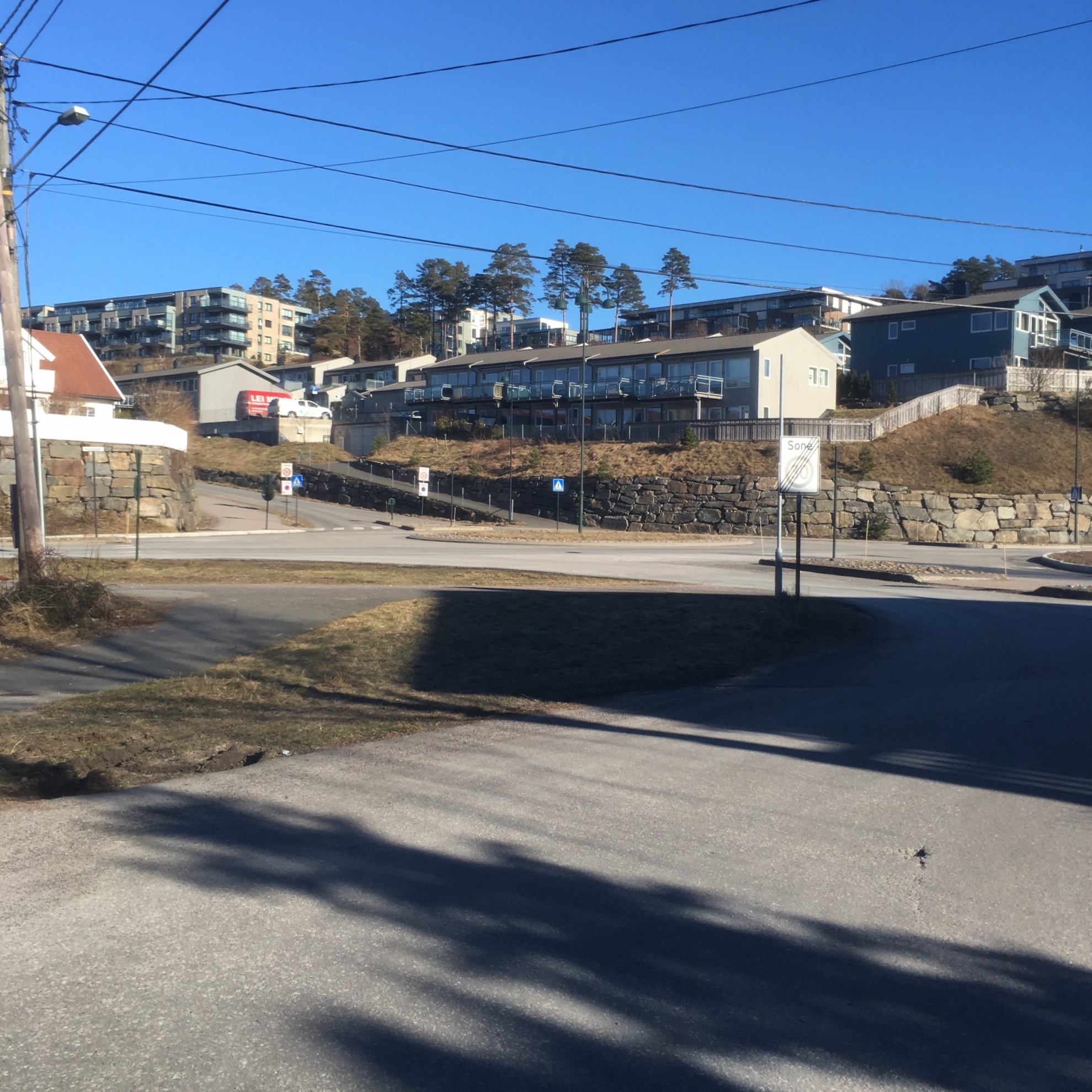
Fidjeåsen (seen from Morildveien), Holte

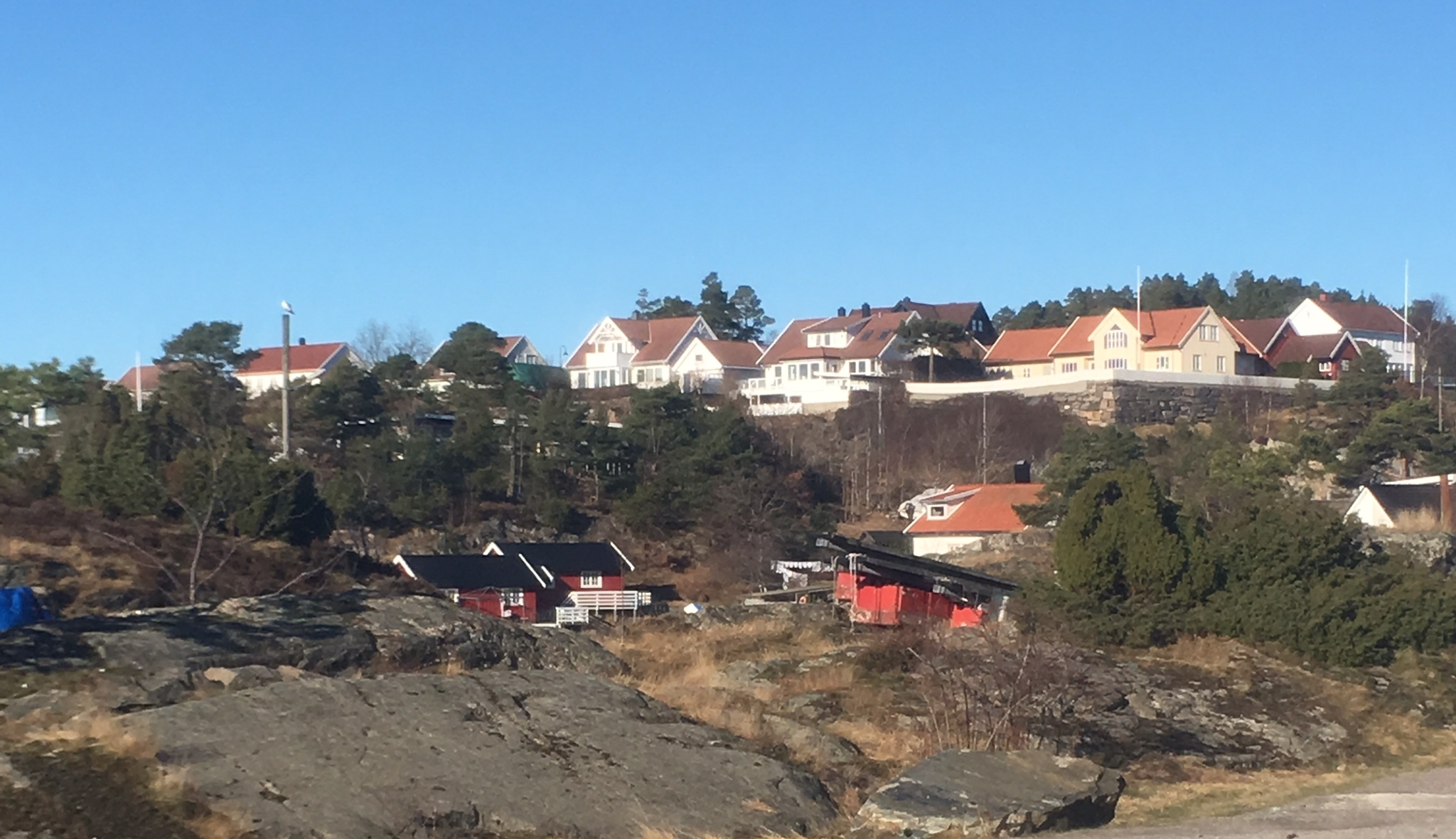
Rabbesvik
