= Flekkefjord District Court =

Former district court in Norway

- Flekkefjord tingrett
- 58.2961°N 6.66518°E
- Established: 1591
- Dissolved: 1 January 2004
- Jurisdiction: Southwestern Vest-Agder
- Location: Flekkefjord, Norway
- Coordinates: 58.2961°N 6.66518°E
- Appeals to: Agder Court of Appeal

Flekkefjord District Court (Norwegian: Flekkefjord tingrett) was a district court in Vest-Agder county, Norway. The court was based in the town of Flekkefjord. The court existed from 1809 until 2005. It had jurisdiction over the municipalities of Flekkefjord, Kvinesdal, and Sirdal. Cases from this court could be appealed to Agder Court of Appeal.

The court was a court of first instance. Its judicial duties were mainly to settle criminal cases and to resolve civil litigation as well as bankruptcy. The administration and registration tasks of the court included death registration, issuing certain certificates, performing duties of a notary public, and officiating civil wedding ceremonies. Cases from this court were heard by a combination of professional judges and lay judges.

== History ==
This court was established on 25 September 1809 when the old Lister District Court was divided in two. The western part of the court's jurisdiction became the Flekkefjord District Court and the eastern part became the Lyngdal District Court. On 1 January 2005, the Lyngdal District Court and Flekkefjord District Court were merged to create the new Lister District Court. At the same time, the Sirdal Municipality was transferred to the Dalane District Court (instead of joining the Lister court).
