= Lister District Court =

Former district court in Norway

- Lister tingrett
- 58.09238°N 6.80829°E
- Established: 1 January 2005
- Dissolved: 26 April 2021
- Jurisdiction: Southwestern Agder
- Location: Barbros gate 21, Gåseholmen; Farsund, Norway
- Coordinates: 58.09238°N 6.80829°E
- Appeals to: Agder Court of Appeal

Lister District Court (Norwegian: Lister tingrett) was a district court in Agder county, Norway. The court was based in the town of Farsund. The court existed from 2005 until 2021. It had jurisdiction over the southwestern part of the county which included the municipalities of Farsund, Hægebostad, Flekkefjord, Kvinesdal, and Lyngdal. Cases from this court could be appealed to Agder Court of Appeal. This court employed a chief judge, three other judges, and four prosecutors.

The court was a court of first instance. Its judicial duties were mainly to settle criminal cases and to resolve civil litigation as well as bankruptcy. The administration and registration tasks of the court included death registration, issuing certain certificates, performing duties of a notary public, and officiating civil wedding ceremonies. Cases from this court were heard by a combination of professional judges and lay judges.

== History ==
This court was first established in 1591 when the district court system was set up in Norway. It served the Lister area of Lister og Mandal county. The court was divided on 25 September 1809 when the western part of the court's jurisdiction became the Flekkefjord District Court and the eastern part became the Lyngdal District Court. On 1 January 2005, the Lyngdal District Court and Flekkefjord District Court were merged to create the new Lister District Court (roughly corresponding to the old court of the same name). On 26 April 2021, Lister District Court was merged with the Kristiansand District Court and Aust-Agder District Court to create the new Agder District Court.

== Name ==
For information about the name, see Lista Municipality#Name.
