= Sand District Court =

Former district court in Norway

- Sand tingrett
- 58.33765°N 8.59173°E
- Established: 23 March 1852
- Dissolved: 1 September 2004
- Jurisdiction: Southeastern Aust-Agder
- Location: Grimstad, Norway
- Coordinates: 58.33765°N 8.59173°E
- Appeals to: Agder Court of Appeal

Sand District Court (Norwegian: Sand tingrett) was a district court in Aust-Agder county, Norway. The court was based in the town of Grimstad. The court existed from 1852 until 2004. It had jurisdiction over the municipalities of Grimstad, Birkenes, and Lillesand. Cases from this court could be appealed to Agder Court of Appeal.

The court was a court of first instance. Its judicial duties were mainly to settle criminal cases and to resolve civil litigation as well as bankruptcy. The administration and registration tasks of the court included death registration, issuing certain certificates, performing duties of a notary public, and officiating civil wedding ceremonies. Cases from this court were heard by a combination of professional judges and lay judges.

== History ==
This court was established on 23 March 1852 when the old district courts for the region were reorganized. The old Vestre Nedenes District Court was closed and the Fjære, Landvik, and Lillesand areas were merged to form the new Sand District Court (the rest of the Vestre Nedenes District Court's old jurisdiction was added to the Nedenes District Court). In 1926, the Grimstad Town Court was closed and the town became part of the jurisdiction of this court. At this time, the court moved from its old location in Lillesand to Grimstad. On 1 January 2004, the municipalities of Lillesand and Birkenes were transferred to the Kristiansand District Court (leaving just Grimstad municipality as part of the Sand District Court). On 1 September 2004, the Sand District Court was merged with the old Nedenes District Court and Holt District Court to create the new Aust-Agder District Court.
