= Randesund Municipality =

Former municipality in Vest-Agder, Norway

Randesund Municipality Randesund herred
- Former municipality
- Randøsund herred (historic name)
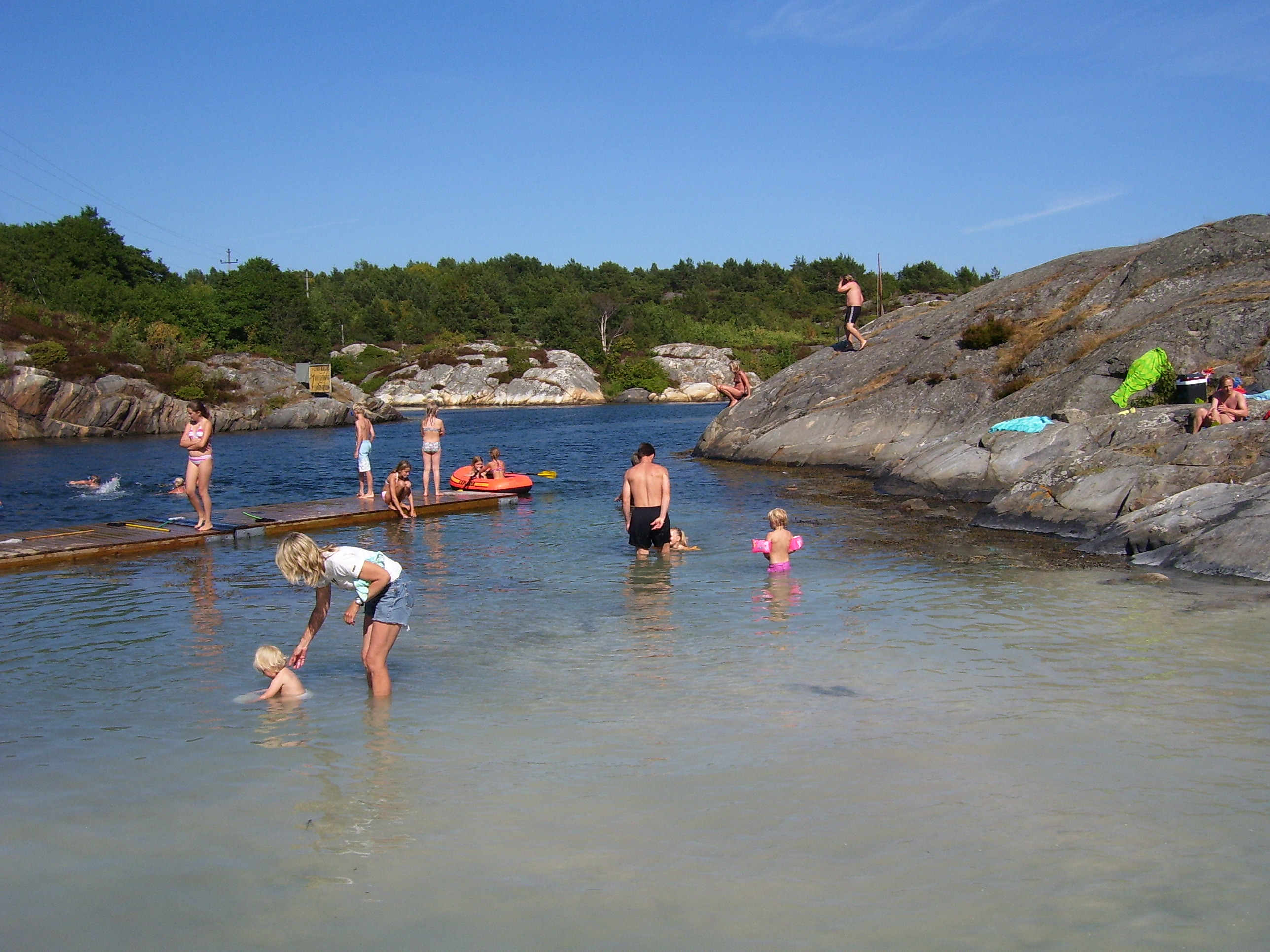

- Vest-Agder within Norway

- Randesund within Vest-Agder
- Coordinates: 58.1342°N 08.1176°E
- Country: Norway
- County: Vest-Agder
- District: Sørlandet
- Established: 31 Dec 1893
  - Preceded by: Oddernes Municipality
- Disestablished: 1 Jan 1965
  - Succeeded by: Kristiansand Municipality
- Administrative centre: Randesund

Government
  - Mayor (1963–1965): Toralv Torsvik

Area (upon dissolution)
  - Total: 44.8 km^{2} (17.3 sq mi)
  - Rank: #474 in Norway
- Highest elevation: 126.6 m (415 ft)

Population (1964)
  - Total: 1,606
  - Rank: #442 in Norway
  - Density: 35.8/km^{2} (93/sq mi)
  - Change (10 years): ▲ +41.4%

Official language
  - Norwegian form: Neutral
- Time zone: UTC+01:00 (CET)
  - Summer (DST): UTC+02:00 (CEST)
- ISO 3166 code: NO-1011

Randesund is a former municipality in the old Vest-Agder county, Norway. The 44.8-square-kilometre (17.3 sq mi) municipality existed from 1893 until its dissolution in 1965. The area is now part of Kristiansand Municipality in Agder county. The administrative centre was the village of Randesund where Randesund Church is located. Since 1965, the area of Randesund has been the district of Randesund within the city of Kristiansand.

Prior to its dissolution in 1965, the 44.8-square-kilometre (17.3 sq mi) municipality was the 474th largest by area out of the 525 municipalities in Norway. Randesund Municipality was the 442nd most populous municipality in Norway with a population of about 1,606. The municipality's population density was 35.8 inhabitants per square kilometre (93/sq mi) and its population had increased by 41.4% over the previous 10-year period.

== General information ==
The municipality of Randesund was established on 31 December 1893 when the large Oddernes Municipality was divided into two: the southeastern district (population: 1,133) became the new Randeund Municipality and the northwestern district (population: 3,076) continued as a smaller Oddernes Municipality.

During the 1960s, there were many municipal mergers across Norway due to the work of the Schei Committee. On 1 January 1965, Tveit Municipality was dissolved and the following areas were merged to form an enlarged Kristiansand Municipality:

- all of Randesund Municipality (population: 1,672)d
- all of Kristiansand Municipality (population: 27,100)
- all of Oddernes Municipality (population: 18,668)
- all of Tveit Municipality (population: 2,802)

=== Name ===
The municipality (originally the parish) is named after the old Randøen farm (Old Norse: Rǫnd) which was located on an island of the same name. The first element is derived from the word rǫnd which means "edge" or "rim". The last element of the name is identical to the word sund which means strait or "sound".

Historically, the name of the municipality was spelled Randøsund. On 3 November 1917, a royal resolution changed the spelling of the name of the municipality to Randesund.

=== Churches ===
The Church of Norway had one parish (sokn) within Randesund Municipality. At the time of the municipal dissolution, it was part of the Oddernes prestegjeld and the Kristiansand domprosti (arch-deanery) in the Diocese of Agder.

Churches in Randesund Municipality
Parish (sokn)	Church name	Location of the church	Year built
Randesund	Randesund Church	Randesund	1864

== Geography ==
The municipality was located on the east side of the mouth of the river Topdalsfjorden. The highest point in the municipality was the 126.6-metre (415 ft) tall mountain Roksheia. Tveit Municipality was located to the north, Høvåg Municipality was located to the northeast (in Aust-Agder county), the Skagerrak was to the south, Oddernes Municipality was located to the southwest, Kristiansand Municipality was located to the west, and Oddernes Municipality was located to the northwest.

== Government ==
While it existed, Randesund Municipality was responsible for primary education (through 10th grade), outpatient health services, senior citizen services, welfare and other social services, zoning, economic development, and municipal roads and utilities. The municipality was governed by a municipal council of directly elected representatives. The mayor was indirectly elected by a vote of the municipal council. The municipality was under the jurisdiction of the Torridal District Court and the Agder Court of Appeal.

=== Municipal council ===
The municipal council (Herredsstyre) of Randesund Municipality was made up of 13 representatives that were elected to four year terms. The tables below show the historical composition of the council by political party.

Randesund herredsstyre 1963–1964
Party name (in Norwegian)	Number of representatives
Labour Party (Arbeiderpartiet)	3
Conservative Party (Høyre)	2
Christian Democratic Party (Kristelig Folkeparti)	2
Joint List(s) of Non-Socialist Parties (Borgerlige Felleslister)	6
Total number of members:	13
Note: On 1 January 1965, Randesund Municipality became part of Kristiansand Municipality.

Randesund herredsstyre 1959–1963
Party name (in Norwegian)	Number of representatives
Labour Party (Arbeiderpartiet)	4
Conservative Party (Høyre)	2
Local List(s) (Lokale lister)	7
Total number of members:	13

Randesund herredsstyre 1955–1959
Party name (in Norwegian)	Number of representatives
Labour Party (Arbeiderpartiet)	3
Joint List(s) of Non-Socialist Parties (Borgerlige Felleslister)	10
Total number of members:	13

Randesund herredsstyre 1951–1955
Party name (in Norwegian)	Number of representatives
Labour Party (Arbeiderpartiet)	2
Local List(s) (Lokale lister)	10
Total number of members:	12

Randesund herredsstyre 1947–1951
Party name (in Norwegian)	Number of representatives
Labour Party (Arbeiderpartiet)	2
Local List(s) (Lokale lister)	10
Total number of members:	12

Randesund herredsstyre 1945–1947
Party name (in Norwegian)	Number of representatives
Labour Party (Arbeiderpartiet)	2
Local List(s) (Lokale lister)	10
Total number of members:	12

Randesund herredsstyre 1937–1941*
Party name (in Norwegian)	Number of representatives
Labour Party (Arbeiderpartiet)	2
Joint List(s) of Non-Socialist Parties (Borgerlige Felleslister)	10
Total number of members:	12
Note: Due to the German occupation of Norway during World War II, no elections were held for new municipal councils until after the war ended in 1945.

=== Mayors ===
The mayor (Norwegian: ordfører) of Randesund Municipality was the political leader of the municipality and the chairperson of the municipal council. The following people have held this position:

- 1894–1902: Gunnar Danielsen Timenes
- 1903–1908: Ole Christoffersen Slagdalen
- 1909–1917: Ole Hansen Benestad
- 1918–1920: Gunvald N. Tømmerstø
- 1921–1923: Gustav Andreassen Eftevåg
- 1924–1926: Ole Hansen Benestad
- 1927–1935: Albert Kvåse
- 1935–1943: Toralv Torsvik
- 1944–1944: Karl Hånes
- 1945–1945: Thorvald Salterø
- 1945–1947: Toralv Torsvik
- 1948–1951: Knut Larsen Stangenes
- 1952–1956: Karl Hånes
- 1957–1960: Toralv Torsvik
- 1961–1963: Jens Fjeldal
- 1963–1965: Toralv Torsvik

== See also ==
- List of former municipalities of Norway
