= Holt District Court =

Former district court in Norway

- Holt tingrett
- 58.62677°N 8.916478°E
- Established: 23 March 1852
- Dissolved: 1 September 2004
- Jurisdiction: Northeastern Aust-Agder
- Location: Tvedestrand, Norway
- Coordinates: 58.62677°N 8.916478°E
- Appeals to: Agder Court of Appeal

Holt District Court (Norwegian: Holt tingrett) was a district court in Aust-Agder county, Norway. The court was based in the town of Tvedestrand. The court existed from 1852 until 2004. It had jurisdiction over the municipalities of Gjerstad, Risør, Tvedestrand, and Vegårshei. Cases from this court could be appealed to Agder Court of Appeal.

The court was a court of first instance. Its judicial duties were mainly to settle criminal cases and to resolve civil litigation as well as bankruptcy. The administration and registration tasks of the court included death registration, issuing certain certificates, performing duties of a notary public, and officiating civil wedding ceremonies. Cases from this court were heard by a combination of professional judges and lay judges.

== History ==
This court was established on 23 March 1852 when the old district courts for the region were reorganized. The eastern part of the old Østre Nedenes District Court plus the Vegårshei area of the Østre Råbyggelaget District Court were merged to form the new Holt District Court. On 1 September 2004, the Holt District Court was merged with the old Nedenes District Court and Sand District Court to create the new Aust-Agder District Court.
