= Agder District Court =

First-instance law court in Norway

- Agder tingrett
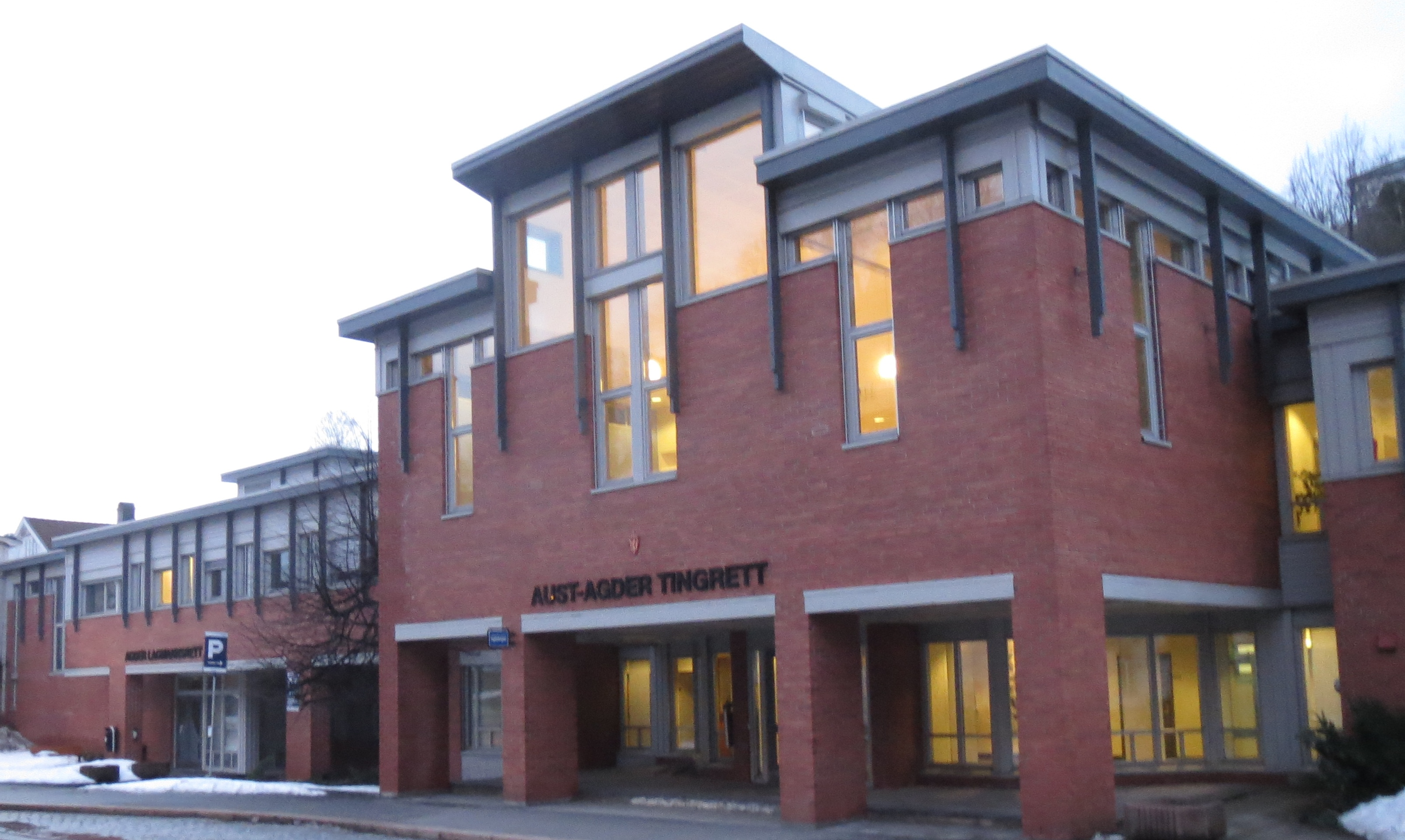
- The courthouse in Arendal
- Interactive map of Agder District Court
- 58°08′50″N 7°59′55″E
- Established: 26 April 2021
- Jurisdiction: Agder, Norway
- Location: Arendal, Farsund, and Kristiansand
- Coordinates: 58°08′50″N 7°59′55″E
- Appeals to: Agder Court of Appeal
- Website: Official website

Agder District Court (Norwegian: Agder tingrett) is a district court located in Agder county, Norway. This court is based at three different courthouses which are located in Farsund, Kristiansand, and Arendal. The court is subordinate to the Agder Court of Appeal. The court serves most of Agder county and includes cases from 24 municipalities.

- The courthouse in Farsund accepts cases from the municipalities of Farsund, Flekkefjord, Hægebostad, Kvinesdal, and Lyngdal.
- The courthouse in Kristiansand accepts cases from the municipalities of Birkenes, Bygland, Bykle, Evje og Hornnes, Iveland, Kristiansand, Lillesand, Lindesnes, Valle, Vennesla, and Åseral.
- The courthouse in Arendal accepts cases from the municipalities of Arendal, Froland, Gjerstad, Grimstad, Risø, Tvedestrand, Vegårshei, and Åmli.

The court is led by a chief judge (sorenskriver) and several other judges. The court is a court of first instance. Its judicial duties are mainly to settle criminal cases and to resolve civil litigation as well as bankruptcy. The administration and registration tasks of the court include death registration, issuing certain certificates, performing duties of a notary public, and officiating civil wedding ceremonies. Cases from this court are heard by a combination of professional judges and lay judges.

== History ==
This court was established on 26 April 2021 after the old Aust-Agder District Court, Kristiansand District Court, and Lister District Court were all merged into one court. The new district court system continues to use the courthouses from the predecessor courts.
