= Randesund Church =

Church in Agder, Norway

- Randesund kirke
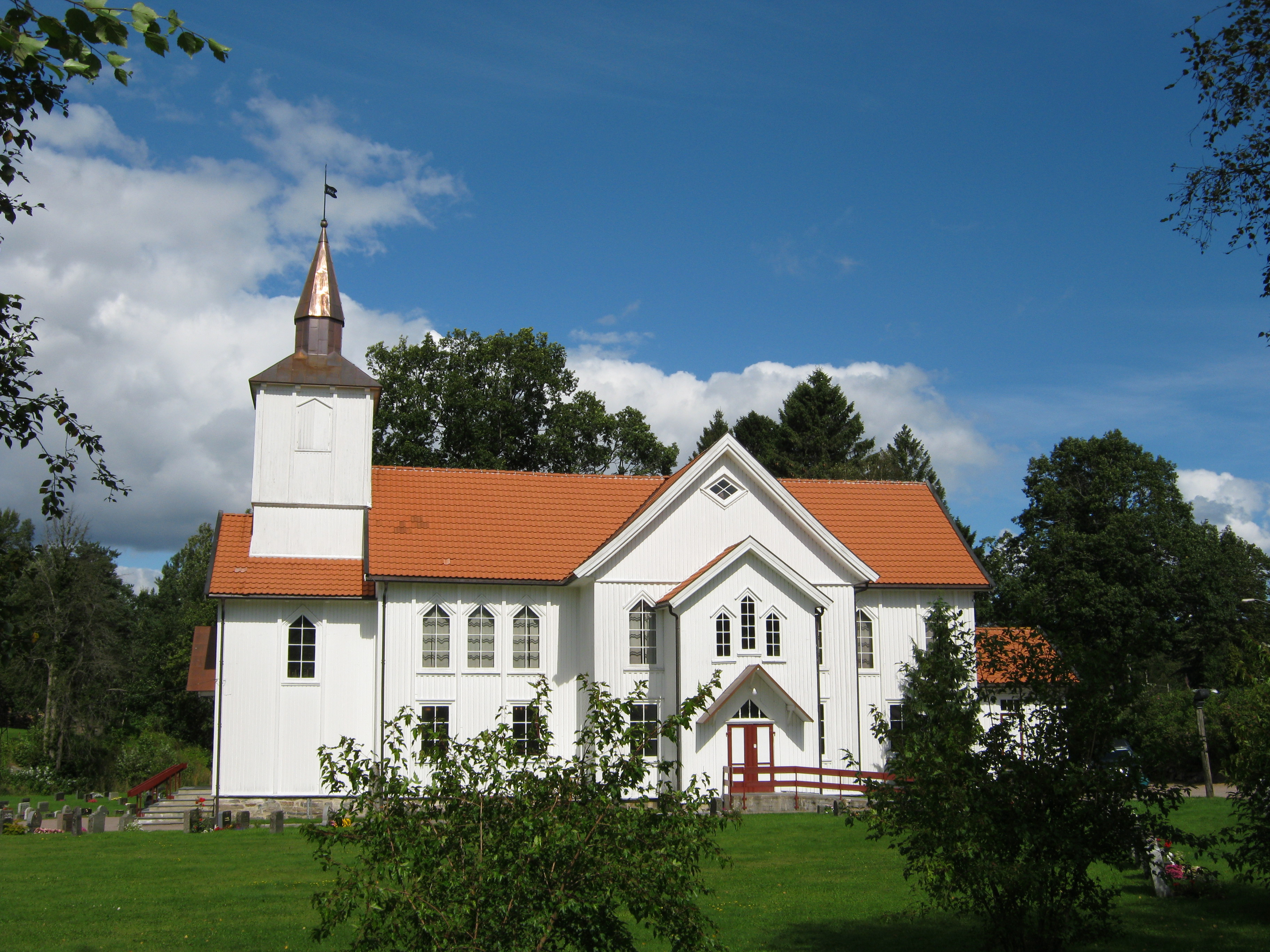
- View of the church
- Randesund Church
- 58.1342°N 08.1176°E
- Location: Kristiansand Municipality, Agder
- Country: Norway
- Denomination: Church of Norway
- Churchmanship: Evangelical Lutheran
- Website: randesund.no

History
- Status: Parish church
- Founded: 1864
- Consecrated: 28 Oct 1864

Architecture
- Functional status: Active
- Architect: Christian Heinrich Grosch
- Architectural type: Cruciform
- Completed: 1864 (162 years ago)

Specifications
- Capacity: 450
- Materials: Wood

Administration
- Diocese: Agder og Telemark
- Deanery: Kristiansand domprosti
- Parish: Randesund
- Norwegian Cultural Heritage Site
- Type: Church
- Status: Not protected
- ID: 85270

Randesund Church (Norwegian: Randesund kirke) is a parish church of the Church of Norway in Kristiansand Municipality in Agder county, Norway. It is located in the Frikstad neighborhood in the Randesund district in the borough of Oddernes inside the city of Kristiansand. It is one of the churches for the Randesund parish which is part of the Kristiansand domprosti (arch-deanery) in the Diocese of Agder og Telemark. The white, wooden church was built in a cruciform design in 1864 using plans drawn up by the architect Christian Heinrich Grosch. The church seats about 450 people.

The church was consecrated on 28 October 1864 by the Bishop Jacob von der Lippe. The church is surrounded by a cemetery.

== Media gallery ==
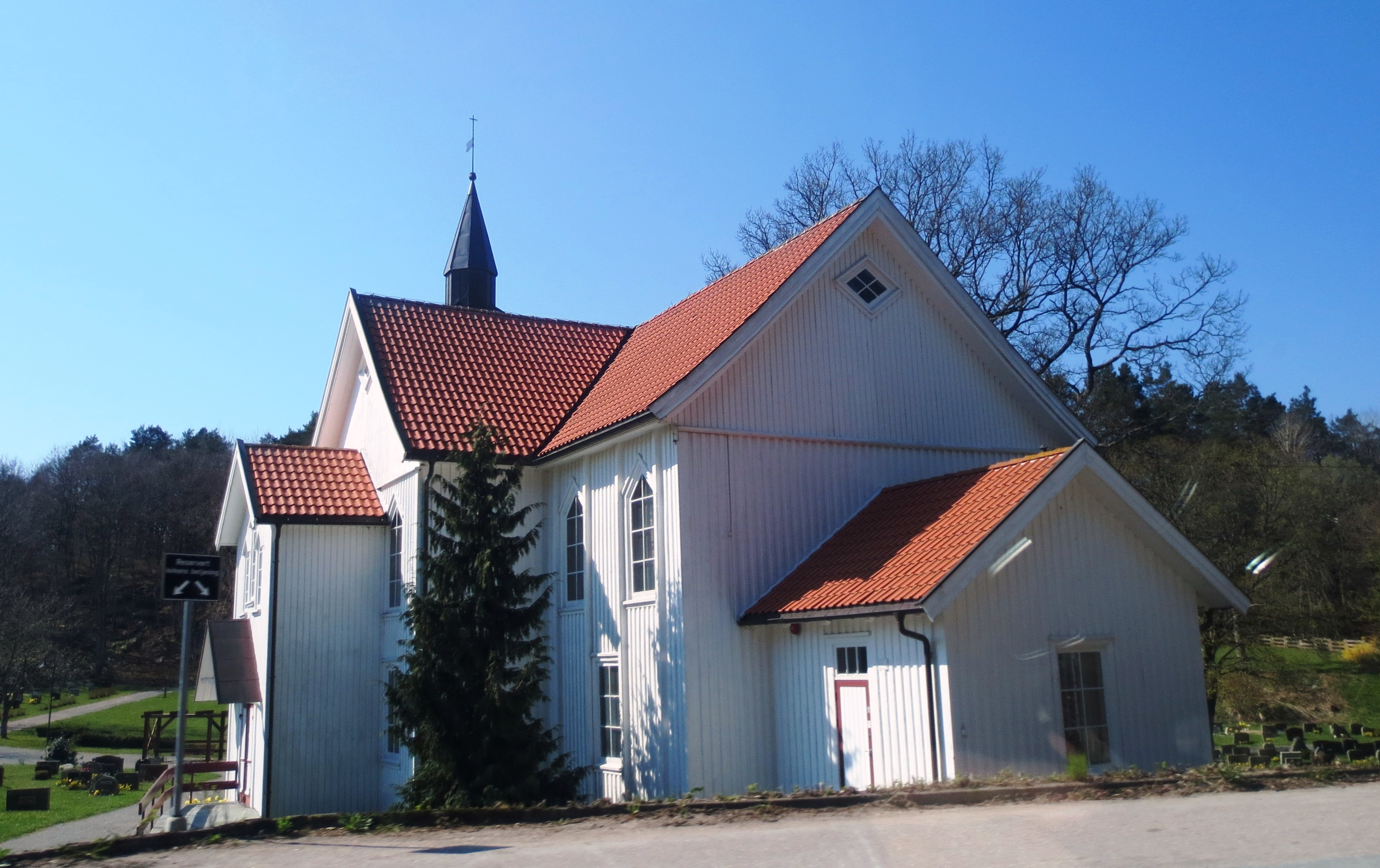

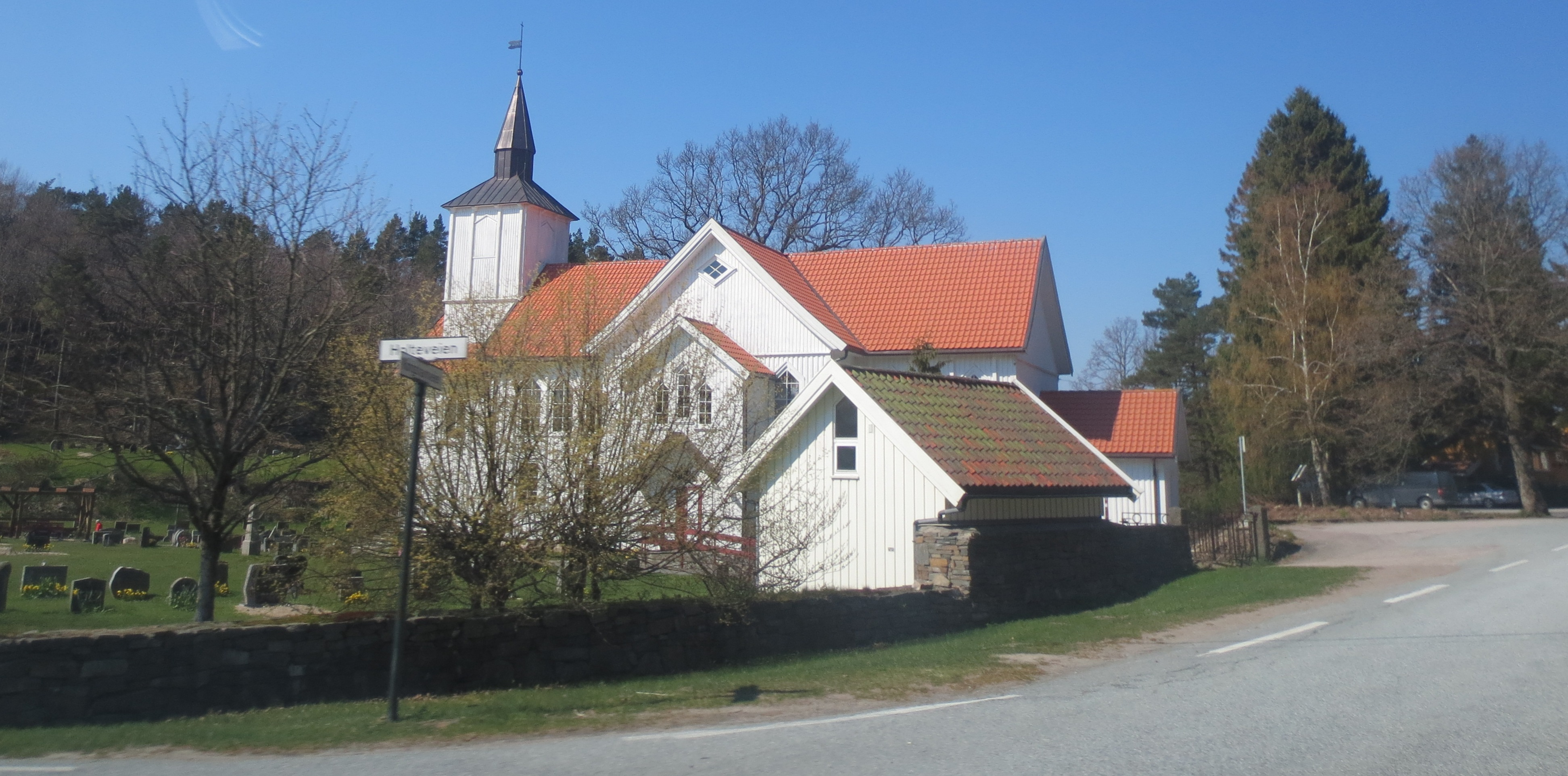

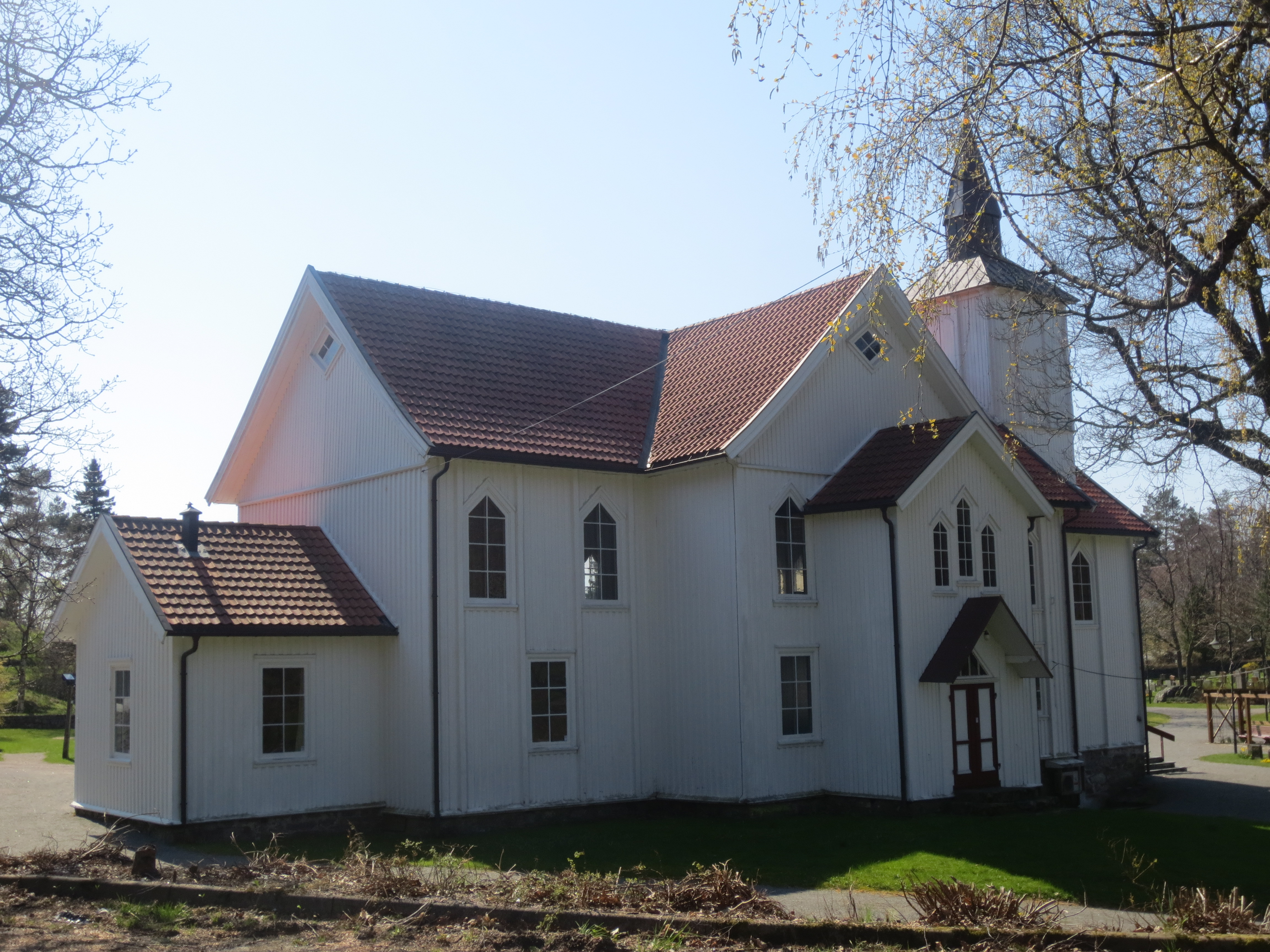

== See also ==
- List of churches in Agder og Telemark
